= 2013 Delhi Legislative Assembly election =

2013 state assembly election in Delhi

- 4 December 2013

All 70 seats in the Legislative Assembly of Delhi 36 seats needed for a majority
- Opinion polls
- Turnout: 66.02% (▲8.42%)
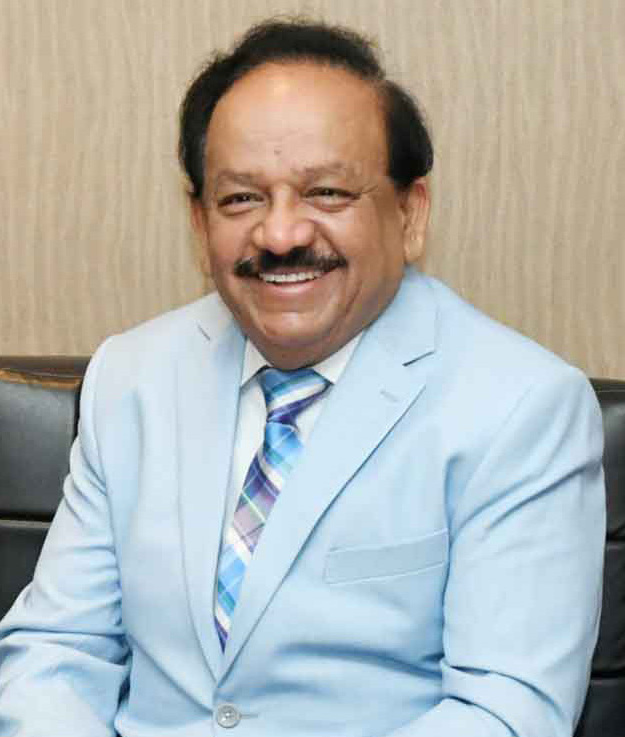

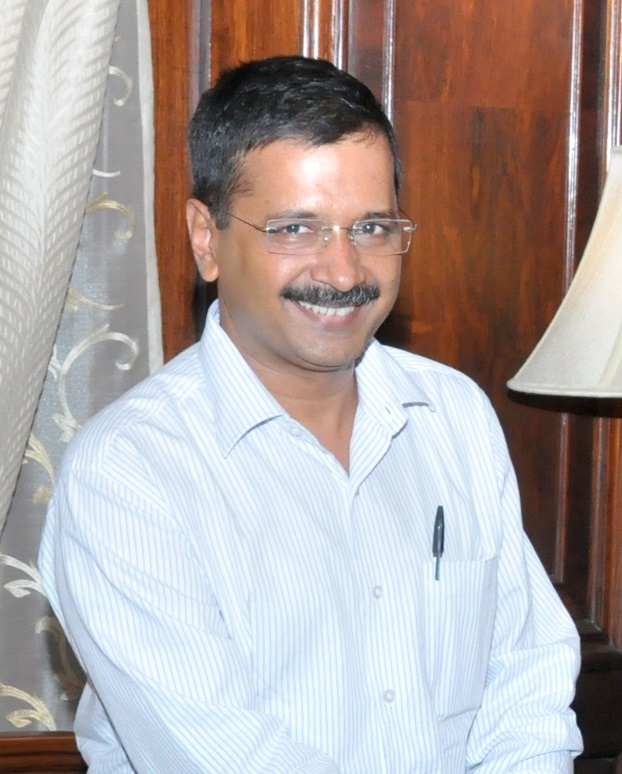

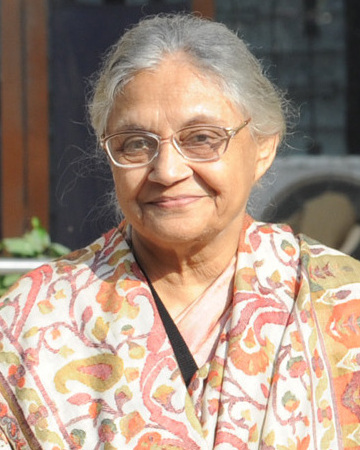
	First party	Second party	Third party
Leader	Harsh Vardhan	Arvind Kejriwal	Sheila Dikshit
Party	BJP	AAP	INC(I)
Leader since	2012	2012	1998
Leader's seat	Krishna Nagar	New Delhi	New Delhi (lost)
Last election	New	Party did not exist	Party did not contest
Seats won	31	28	8
Seat change	▲8	▼30	▼35
Popular vote	2,604,100	2,322,330	1,932,933
Percentage	33.07%	29.5%	24.6%
Swing	▲3.27%	Steady	▼15.7%
	Fourth party	Fifth party	Sixth party
	SAD	JD(U)	JD
Leader			Mayawati
Party	SAD	JD(U)	JD
Leader's seat			Not Contested
Seats before	Party did not contest	Party did not contest	2
Seats after	1	1	0
Seat change	▲1	▲1	▼2
Popular vote	71,757	68,818	420,926
Percentage	1.0%	0.87%	5.35%
Swing		n/a	▼8.69%

- Structure of the Delhi Legislative Assembly after the election
Chief Minister before election
Sheila Dikshit
INC(I)
Elected Chief Minister
Harsh Vardhan
BJP

The Delhi Legislative Assembly election was held on 4 December 2013, with the result announced on 8 December resulting in formation of the Fifth Legislative Assembly of Delhi.

The Bharatiya Janata Party won a plurality, closely followed by Aam Aadmi Party, in the latter party's first election; this resulted in a hung assembly. After the BJP refused to form a government in the hung assembly, the Aam Aadmi Party's (AAP) Arvind Kejriwal became chief minister with external support from the Indian National Congress (INC).

== Electoral law change ==
This was one of the first five elections in which the Election Commission of India implemented a "None of the above" (NOTA) voting option, allowing the electorate to register a neutral to people any think vote but not to outright reject candidates. In a first, the Election Commission of India also appointed Central Awareness Observers, whose main task was to oversee voter awareness and facilitation.

== Contesting parties ==
There were 810 candidates running for office, including 224 independents.

Alliance/Party		Flag	Symbol	Leader	Seats contested	
NDA	Bharatiya Janata Party			Harsh Vardhan	66	70
NDA	Shiromani Akali Dal			Sukhbir Singh Badal	4	70
Aam Aadmi Party				Arvind Kejriwal	70	
Indian National Congress				Sheila Dikshit	70	
Bahujan Samaj Party				Mayawati	69	
Janata Dal (United)				Nitish Kumar	27	
Samajwadi Party				Akhilesh Yadav	25	
Lok Jan Shakti Party				Ram Vilas Paswan	16	
Desiya Murpokku Dravida Kazhagam				Vijayakant	11	
Nationalist Congress Party				Sharad Pawar	9	
Shiv Sena				Uddhav Thackeray	9	
Rashtriya Lok Dal				Chudhary Ajit Singh	7	
Indian National Lok Dal				Om Prakash Chautala	2	
LF	Communist Party of India			Sudhakar Reddy	10	19
LF	Communist Party of India (Marxist–Leninist) Liberation			Dipankar Bhattacharya	4	19
LF	Communist Party of India (Marxist)			Prakash Karat	3	19
LF	All India Forward Bloc				2	19
Social Democratic Party of India					1	
INDEPENDENTS					224	

== Campaign ==
The AAP leader Arvind Kejriwal called the BJP's Harsh Vardhan the "Manmohan Singh of the BJP" as incapable of stemming the "rot" in Delhi's governance. He added: "We will help the people of Delhi get rid of Congress misgovernance first, and then ensure change at the national level in the Lok Sabha polls." However, Vardhan was supported by the BJP's prime ministerial candidate in the 2014 Indian general election, Narendra Modi. The Hindustan Times suggested that the Rajnath Singh-appointed BJP Delhi leader, Vijay Goel, though organisationally competent, lost favour due to his exclusion of established regional leaders in reorganising local units. Singh was still viewed as reluctant to "change horses in mid-stream" but agreed. Modi led the charge, with other party leaders, to have Vardhan as the chief ministerial candidate and Goel himself agreed to the nomination of Vardhan. The AAP released its first electoral manifesto.

== Opinion polls ==
Number of seats

Survey	Date	AAP	BJP	INC	Others	Source
AAP-Cicero	30 November 2013	38-50	11-17	8-14	0-13	
BJP (Internal)	November 2013	5	36	11	-	18 "swing seats where the readings were too close to call"
India TV-CVoter	November 2013	10	29	27	4	
India Today, ORG	November 2013	6	36	22	4	
Times Now, C-Voter	November 2013	18	25	24	3	
CNN-IBN, The Week and CSDS	October 2013	19-25	22-28	19-25	0-2	
ABP News-AC Nielsen	October 2013	18	28	22	2	
India TV-CVoter-Times Now	September 2013	7	30	29	4	
Hindustan Times-C Fore	September 2013	7-12	22-27	32-37	0-4	

Vote share

Survey	Date	AAP	BJP	INC	Others	Source
AAP-Cicero	30 November 2013	36%	27%	26%	11%	
BJP	November 2013	18%	35%	24%	23%	
India TV-CVoter	November 2013	24%	33%	30%	13%	
CNN-IBN, The Week and CSDS	October 2013	28%	29%	27%	16%	
ABP News-AC Nielsen	September 2013	15%	34%	29%	22%	
India TV-CVoter-Times Now	September 2013	16%	38%	34%	12%	
Hindustan Times-C Fore	September 2013	20%	32%	34%	14%	
AAP-Cicero	September 2013	32%	23%	25%	20%	

== Election ==
There were 11,753 polling stations, including the presence of EVMs, while 630 identified as critical and hypercritical. There were 11.9 million eligible voters, of which 6.6 million were men and 5.3 million were women while there were 405,000 first-time voters. 32,801 Delhi Police personnel and 107 companies of central paramilitary forces were deployed to ensure a peaceful election. Polling stations opened at 8:00 am and turnout was 66%.

Voter-verified paper audit trail (VVPAT) along with EVMs was used in 1 assembly seat in Delhi elections-New Delhi. Polling stations in Tuglaqabad, Karol Bagh, Trilokpuri and Badarpur reportedly had long waits because EVMs dysfunctioned. In Jungpura, Badli, Krishna Nagar, and Kondli constituencies, some voters complained that their names were on the electoral rolls and that they could not vote.

After voting, party leaders expressed their opinion. Kejriwal said he is confident of a positive result for his party. Vardhan claimed the BJP was "far ahead" of the INC and Aam Aadmi Party. "I can tell you very categorically that we are far ahead of Congress and the new entrant in Delhi politics. I am 100 percent confident about our victory. I think nobody can make any dent in our vote bank. If there is any contest or fight, it is between the Congress and the new entrant (for the second place)." Dikshit said she had her "fingers crossed" on the outcome, while national party leader Sonia Gandhi said from her Nirman Bhavan polling station: "We will win." At many places people with disabilities could not vote due to inaccessible polling booths.

In all over 43,000 postal ballots were received, an increase from the last election's 1,600 postal ballots. The Delhi Election Commission announced that 2,000 Central Paramilitary Force and Delhi Police personnel were at the vote-counting centers in the city on the day of the result announcement and CCTV cameras and live streaming of proceedings through webcasting, two layers of security cover have been set at all the 14 counting centers. Delhi Chief Electoral Officer Vijay Dev said: "Paramilitary force forms the inner circle of security of centers while adequate numbers of Delhi Police personnel will ensure safety from outside. Counting of votes will start from 8 AM tomorrow and during the first-hour postal ballots will be counted." The postal ballots were counted before the EVM votes.

Exit polls showed the BJP in the lead to possibly form a government on its own, followed by the AAP and the incumbent INC in third place; others, in general, were fourth with the BSP following.

== Result ==
Notably, the INC's Chaudhary Prem Singh lost in the Ambedkar Nagar constituency, he held the seat since 1993 and had not lost a single election in 50 years; however, Ashok Kumar of the AAP won the seat. Incumbent Chief Minister Sheila Dikshit lost her New Delhi constituency seat to AAP leader Arvind Kejriwal by a margin that was much more than her total votes and winning hardly 500 votes more than the BJP's Vijender Kumar who finished third; she then submitted her resignation to Lieutenant Governor Najeeb Jung.

Summary of results of the 2013 Delhi Legislative Assembly election
Political party	Flag	Seats Contested	Won	Net change in seats	% of seats	Votes	Vote %	Change in vote %
Bharatiya Janata Party		66	31	▲8	44.3	2,604,100	33.07	▼3
Aam Aadmi Party		69	28	New	40.0	2,322,330	29.49	New
Indian National Congress		70	8	▼35	11.4	1,932,933	24.55	▼15
Janata Dal (United)		27	1	▲1	1.4	68,818	0.87	New
Shiromani Akali Dal		4	1	▲1	1.4	71,757	1	N/A
Independents		225	1	0	1.4		10	N/A
Total			70	Voters		7,699,800	Turnout: 66%	

=== Results by districts ===
District	Seats				
District	Seats	BJP	AAP	INC	OTH
North Delhi	8	4	3	1	—N/a
Central Delhi	7	—N/a	4	2	1
North West Delhi	7	3	2	1	1
West Delhi	7	4	3	1	—N/a
New Delhi	6	2	4	—N/a	—N/a
South West Delhi	7	6	1	—N/a	—N/a
South East Delhi	7	3	3	1	—N/a
South Delhi	5	2	3	—N/a	—N/a
East Delhi	6	1	4	1	—N/a
Shahdara	5	4	1	—N/a	—N/a
North East Delhi	5	3	—N/a	2	—N/a
Total	70	32	28	8	2

=== Results by constituency ===
Assembly Constituency		Turnout (%)	Winner				Runner Up				Margin
#	Name	Turnout (%)	Candidate	Party	Votes	%	Candidate	Party	Votes	%	Margin
North Delhi District
1	Narela	68.15	Neel Daman Khatri	BJP	54,622	37.95	Virender	BSP	31,077	21.59	23,545
Central Delhi District
2	Burari	65.96	Sanjeev Jha	AAP	60,164	37.07	Sri Krishan	BJP	49,813	30.69	10,351
3	Timarpur	65.48	Harish Khanna	AAP	39,650	35.03	Rajni Abbi	BJP	36,267	32.04	3,383
North Delhi District
4	Adarsh Nagar	66.44	Ram Kishan Singhal	BJP	36,985	38.08	Jagdeep Rana	AAP	26,929	27.73	10,056
5	Badli	61.53	Devender Yadav	INC	54,372	44.60	Vijay Kumar Bhagat	BJP	31,263	25.65	23,109
North West Delhi District
6	Rithala	64.91	Kulwant Rana	BJP	73,961	51.30	Harish Awasthi	AAP	48,135	33.39	25,286
North Delhi District
7	Bawana(SC)	61.14	Gugan Singh Ranga	BJP	68,407	41.10	Manoj	AAP	42,768	25.69	25,639
North West Delhi District
8	Mundka	63.28	Rambir Shokeen	IND	52,564	34.27	Azad Singh	BJP	45,430	29.62	7,134
9	Kirari	64.21	Anil Jha Vats	BJP	72,283	52.15	Rajan Prakash	AAP	23,757	17.14	48,526
10	Sultanpur Majra(SC)	63.88	Jai Kishan	INC	31,458	29.79	Sandeep Kumar	AAP	30,346	28.74	1,112
West Delhi District
11	Nangloi Jat	61.64	Manoj Kumar Shokeen	BJP	57,449	42.32	Dr. Bijender Singh	INC	46,434	34.20	11,015
North West Delhi District
12	Mangol Puri(SC)	69.73	Rakhi Birla	AAP	44,383	38.42	Raj Kumar Chauhan	INC	33,798	29.25	10,585
North Delhi District
13	Rohini	68.15	Rajesh Garg	AAP	47,890	43.54	Jai Bhagwan Aggarwal	BJP	46,018	41.84	1,852
North West Delhi District
14	Shalimar Bagh	66.62	Bandana Kumari	AAP	47,235	44.01	Ravinder Nath Bansal	BJP	36,584	34.09	10,651
North Delhi District
15	Shakur Basti	70.85	Satyendra Kumar Jain	AAP	40,232	42.30	Shyam Lal Garg	BJP	33,170	34.87	7,062
North West Delhi District
16	Tri Nagar	66.55	Nand Kishore Garg	BJP	36,970	35.78	Jitender Singh Tomar	AAP	34,161	33.06	2,809
North Delhi District
17	Wazirpur	67.05	Dr. Mahender Nagpal	BJP	37,306	36.25	Praveen Kumar	AAP	31,732	30.84	5,574
18	Model Town	68.53	Akhilesh Pati Tripathi	AAP	38,492	39.84	Ashok Goel	BJP	30,617	31.69	7,875
Central Delhi District
19	Sadar Bazar	66.80	Som Dutt	AAP	34,079	31.24	Jai Parkash	BJP	33,283	30.51	796
20	Chandni Chowk	65.48	Parlad Singh Sawhney	INC	26,335	37.77	Suman Kumar Gupta	BJP	18,092	25.95	8,243
21	Matia Mahal	65.77	Shoaib Iqbal	JD(U)	22,732	31.72	Mirza Javed Ali	INC	19,841	27.68	2,891
22	Ballimaran	67.47	Haroon Yusuf	INC	32,105	36.18	Moti Lal Sodhi	BJP	24,012	27.06	8,093
23	Karol Bagh(SC)	67.34	Vishesh Ravi	AAP	35,818	35.06	Surender Pal Ratawal	BJP	34,068	33.34	1,750
New Delhi District
24	Patel Nagar(SC)	65.96	Veena Anand	AAP	38,899	37.91	Poornima Vidyarthi	BJP	32,637	31.81	6,262
West Delhi District
25	Moti Nagar	68.99	Subhash Sachdeva	BJP	42,599	42.42	Kuldeep Singh Channa	AAP	26,578	26.47	16,021
26	Madipur(SC)	68.09	Girish Soni	AAP	36,393	35.87	Kailash Sankla	BJP	35,290	34.88	1,103
27	Rajouri Garden	68.93	Manjinder Singh Sirsa	SAD	41,721	40.93	Dhanwanti Chandela	INC	30,713	30.13	11,008
28	Hari Nagar	66.69	Jagdeep Singh	AAP	38,912	38.81	Shyam Sharma	SAD	30,036	29.96	8,876
29	Tilak Nagar	66.20	Jarnail Singh	AAP	34,993	39.27	Rajiv Babbar	BJP	32,405	36.90	2,088
30	Janakpuri	69.05	Jagdish Mukhi	BJP	42,886	39.87	Rajesh Rishi	AAP	40,242	37.42	2,644
South West Delhi District
31	Vikaspuri	63.23	Mahinder Yadav	AAP	62,030	34.33	Krishan Gahlot	BJP	61,627	34.10	405
32	Uttam Nagar	69.48	Pawan Sharma	BJP	48,377	36.38	Mukesh Sharma	INC	42,031	31.61	6,346
33	Dwarka	65.51	Parduymn Rajput	BJP	42,734	37.30	Ravi Kumar Suryan	AAP	37,537	32.77	5,197
34	Matiala	64.13	Rajesh Gahlot	BJP	70,053	36.10	Gulab Singh Yadav	AAP	66,051	34.05	4,002
35	Najafgarh	67.96	Ajeet Singh Kharkhari	BJP	54,358	33.27	Bharat Singh	INLD	44,590	31.00	9,768
36	Bijwasan	63.15	Sat Prakash Rana	BJP	35,988	34.65	Devinder Sehrawat	AAP	33,574	32.32	2,414
37	Palam	63.14	Dharam Dev Solanki	BJP	42,833	33.30	Bhavna Gaur	AAP	34,661	26.79	8,372
New Delhi District
38	Delhi Cantonment	60.22	Surinder Singh	AAP	26,124	39.67	Karan Singh Tanwar	BJP	25,769	39.13	355
39	Rajinder Nagar	60.54	R. P. Singh	BJP	35,713	35.82	Vijendar Garg Vijay	AAP	33,917	34.02	1,796
40	New Delhi	66.93	Arvind Kejriwal	AAP	44,269	53.46	Sheila Dikshit	INC	18,405	22.23	25,864
South East Delhi District
41	Jangpura	62.30	Maninder Singh Dhir	AAP	29,701	36.95	Tarvinder Singh Marwah	INC	27,957	34.78	1,744
42	Kasturba Nagar	66.56	Madan Lal	AAP	33,609	38.03	Shikha Roy	BJP	28,935	32.74	4,674
South Delhi District
43	Malviya Nagar	65.74	Somnath Bharti	AAP	32,258	39.43	Arti Mehra	BJP	24,486	29.93	7,772
New Delhi District
44	R K Puram	63.46	Anil Kumar Sharma	BJP	28,017	33.17	Shazia Ilmi	AAP	27,691	32.78	326
South Delhi District
45	Mehrauli	62.06	Parvesh Verma	BJP	37,481	38.72	Narinder Singh Sejwal	AAP	32,917	34.01	4,564
46	Chhatarpur	66.12	Brahm Singh Tanwar	BJP	49,975	45.07	Balram Tanwar	INC	33,851	30.53	16,124
47	Deoli(SC)	64.22	Prakash Jarwal	AAP	51,646	43.41	Gagan Rana	BJP	34,538	26.02	17,108
48	Ambedkar Nagar(SC)	68.68	Ashok Kumar Chauhan	AAP	36,239	42.42	Khushiram Chunar	BJP	24,569	28.76	11,670
South East Delhi District
49	Sangam Vihar	64.95	Dinesh Mohaniya	AAP	24,851	27.87	Shiv Charan Lal Gupta	BJP	24,074	27.00	777
New Delhi District
50	Greater Kailash	66.15	Saurabh Bhardwaj	AAP	43,097	45.26	Ajay Kumar Malhotra	BJP	30,005	31.51	13,092
South East Delhi District
51	Kalkaji	63.11	Harmeet Singh Kalka	BJP	30,683	33.77	Dharambir Singh	AAP	28,639	31.52	2,044
52	Tughlakabad	66.19	Ramesh Bidhuri	BJP	34,009	38.98	Sahi Ram	BSP	28,063	32.17	5,946
53	Badarpur	64.20	Ramvir Singh Bidhuri	BJP	43,544	34.23	Ram Singh Netaji	INC	31,490	23.77	12,054
54	Okhla	58.33	Asif Muhammad Khan	INC	50,004	36.34	Irfanullah Khan	AAP	23,459	17.05	26,545
East Delhi District
55	Trilokpuri(SC)	69.10	Raju Dhingan	AAP	44,082	38.93	Sunil Kumar	BJP	26,397	23.31	17,685
56	Kondli(SC)	67.75	Manoj Kumar	AAP	36.863	34.17	Dushyant Kumar Gautam	BJP	29,373	29.22	7,490
57	Patparganj	63.95	Manish Sisodia	AAP	50,211	41.53	Nakul Bharadwaj	BJP	38,735	32.04	11,476
58	Laxmi Nagar	64.70	Vinod Kumar Binny	AAP	43,052	36.41	Dr. Ashok Kumar Walia	INC	35,300	29.85	7,752
Shahdara District
59	Vishwas Nagar	67.09	Om Prakash Sharma	BJP	44,801	38.00	Naseeb Singh	INC	37,002	31.38	7,799
East Delhi District
60	Krishna Nagar	67.78	Harsh Vardhan	BJP	69,222	58.33	Dr. Vinod Kumar Monga	INC	26,072	21.97	43,150
61	Gandhi Nagar	65.86	Arvinder Singh Lovely	INC	48,897	48.47	Ramesh Chand Jain	BJP	31,936	31.66	16,961
Shahdara District
62	Shahdara	67.64	Jitender Singh Shunty	BJP	45,364	42.96	Dr Narender Nath	INC	30,247	28.64	15,117
63	Seemapuri(SC)	72.63	Dharmender Singh	AAP	43,199	37.76	Veer Singh Dhingan	INC	31,223	27.29	11,976
64	Rohtas Nagar	68.92	Jitender Mahajan	BJP	49,916	41.34	Mukesh Hooda	AAP	34,973	28.96	14,943
North East Delhi District
65	Seelampur	68.50	Chaudhary Mateen Ahmed	INC	46,452	46.52	Kaushal Kumar Mishra	BJP	24,724	24.76	21,728
66	Ghonda	65.54	Sahab Singh Chauhan	BJP	47,531	39.25	Bheeshma Sharma	INC	35,599	29.40	11,932
Shahdara District
67	Babarpur	65.89	Naresh Gaur	BJP	34,180	29.73	Zakir Khan	INC	29,673	25.81	4,507
North East Delhi District
68	Gokalpur(SC)	71.68	Rajneet Singh	BJP	34,888	27.24	Surendra Kumar	IND	32,966	25.74	1,922
69	Mustafabad	71.76	Hasan Ahmed	INC	56,250	38.24	Jagdish Pradhan	BJP	54,354	36.95	1,896
70	Karawal Nagar	67.55	Mohan Singh Bisht	BJP	49,262	34.64	Kapil Mishra	AAP	46,179	32.47	3,083

=== Reactions ===
Former Chief Minister Sheila Dikshit said: "We accept our defeat and we will analyze what went wrong. We respect what the people of Delhi have decided and thank them for supporting us for last 15 years."

== Government formation ==
As no party won a majority of the 70 seats in the assembly, if the necessary coalition government is not possible, Delhi would be put under president's rule until a new election is held within six months. However, the INC, BJP, and AAP have all said they would not seek alliances with each other. The other option was to try to bring in independents; though since there are not enough, the media speculated that the other option would be lured away MLAs from another party (the AAP being the most likely in their analysis).

As the BJP won 31 seats, while its alliance partner Shiromani Akali Dal won one seat, they gained a plurality and would have the first right to form a new government. However, they declined the offer from Lieutenant-Governor Najeeb Jung to form a new government citing an inability to obtain a majority. Jung then invited the Aam Aadmi Party to form the government. Kejriwal wrote to BJP national leader Rajnath Singh and INC national leader Sonia Gandhi for clarification on 18 issues before seeking their support in forming a coalition.

On 9 December, Leader of opposition in Rajya Sabha, Arun Jaitley wrote a blog suggesting that Congress should support AAP to form government in Delhi. The BJP did not reply and the INC agreed to 16 of the 18 issues and offered its outside support. On 14 December, BJP Chief Ministerial candidate Dr. Harsh Vardhan asked AAP to take Congress support and form the government. The AAP then sought public opinion through a variety of mediums such as via community meetings, text messages and pamphlets about whether or not it should take the support of the INC. AAP then formed a minority government with outside support from the INC. In a letter to the Lieutenant Governor Najeeb Jung, the AAP did not however mention that it has the support of the INC. Jung then sent his recommendations to President Pranab Mukherjee.

Kejriwal was then sworn in as 7th Chief Minister of Delhi on 28 December, leading the First Kejriwal cabinet, the youngest cabinet in Delhi ever. M. S. Dhir was elected as the speaker of the legislative assembly on 3 January 2014.

Amongst its first tasks, the AAP initiated a corruption response mechanism in a "durbar"; it also retracted the FDI in multi-brand retail that the previous government had sanctioned. Kejriwal said that though this would give consumers more options it has been shown that it "leads to loss of jobs to a very large extent. There is huge unemployment in Delhi and the AAP government does not wish to increase this unemployment. Delhi is not prepared for FDI." Yet he added that he was not against FDI by itself but that it needed to occur on a case-by-case basis.

=== Government resignation ===
After 49 days, Kejriwal resigned as a chief minister following the failure of the introduction of Delhi's Jan Lokpal Bill in the assembly on 14 February 2014. President's rule was then imposed and the assembly was kept in suspended animation. Fresh elections were scheduled for early 2015.

== See also ==
- First Legislative Assembly of Delhi
- Second Legislative Assembly of Delhi
- Third Legislative Assembly of Delhi
- Fourth Legislative Assembly of Delhi
- Fifth Legislative Assembly of Delhi
- Sixth Legislative Assembly of Delhi
