= Kiran Walia =

Indian politician

Cabinet Minister in Government of Delhi
- In office 2008–2013
- Lieutenant Governor: Tejendra Khanna; Najeeb Jung
- Chief Minister: Sheila Dikshit
- Ministry and Departments: Health and Family welfare Department; Women & Child Development and languages

Member of the Delhi Legislative Assembly
- In office 2008–2013
- Constituency: Malviya Nagar
- In office 1998–2008
- Constituency: Hauz Khas

Personal details
- Born: 28 October 1944 (age 81) Delhi
- Party: Indian National Congress
- Children: 1 son, 1 daughter.
- Education: Lady Shri Ram College
- Profession: Professor

Kiran Walia is an Indian politician who is a former member of the Second, Third and Fourth Delhi Legislative Assemblies, in India. She represented the Malviya Nagar constituency of Delhi and is a member of the Indian National Congress.

== Early life and education ==
Kiran Walia was born in New Delhi. She holds Master of Arts degree in political science from Lady Shri Ram College, Delhi University. Before being elected as MLA, she used to work as a professor in Delhi University.

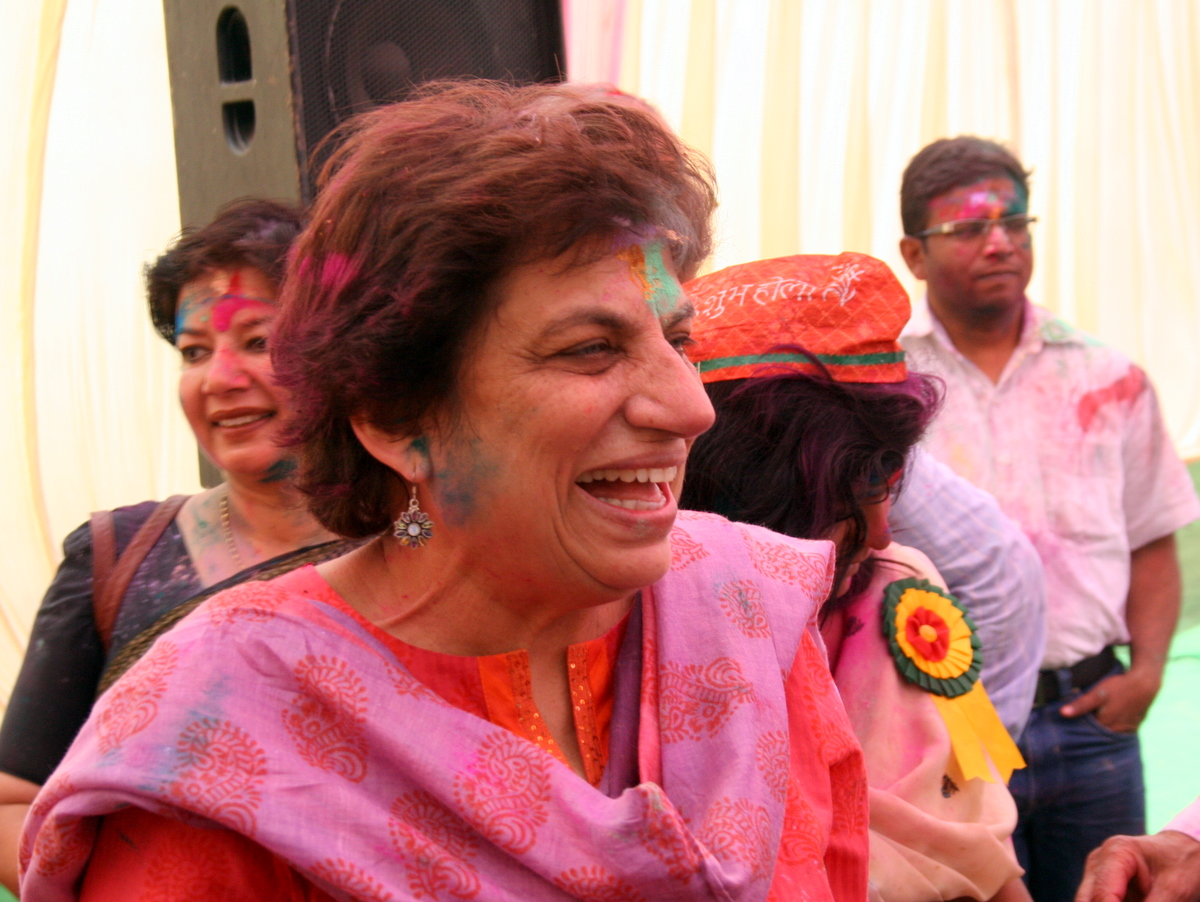
Prof.Kiran Walia participating in Holi function in March 2011

== Political career ==
Kiran Walia has been a MLA for three terms. During her recent term, she represented the Malviya Nagar (Delhi Assembly constituency) constituency. She was also a State Minister in Sheila Dikshit's government.

== Posts Held ==
#	From	To	Position	Comments
01	1998	2003	Member, 02nd Legislative Assembly	
02	2003	2008	Member, 03rd Legislative Assembly	
03	2008	2013	Member, 04th Legislative Assembly	
04	2008	2013	Minister of Health and Family welfare Department	
05	2008	2013	Minister of Women & Child Development and languages	

== See also ==
- First Legislative Assembly of Delhi
- Second Legislative Assembly of Delhi
- Third Legislative Assembly of Delhi
- Fourth Legislative Assembly of Delhi
- Fifth Legislative Assembly of Delhi
- Sixth Legislative Assembly of Delhi
- Delhi Legislative Assembly
- Government of India
- Politics of India
- Indian National Congress
