= 2008 Delhi Legislative Assembly election =

2008 state assembly election in Delhi

2008 Delhi Legislative Assembly Election
- 29 November 2008

All 70 to the Delhi Legislative Assembly 36 seats needed for a majority
- Turnout: 57.60% (▲4.18%)
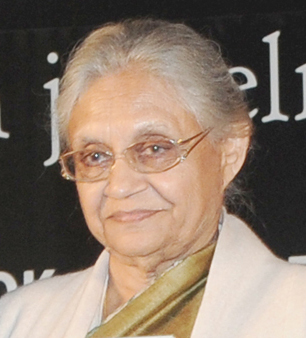

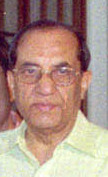

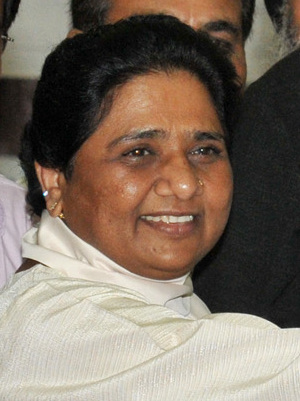

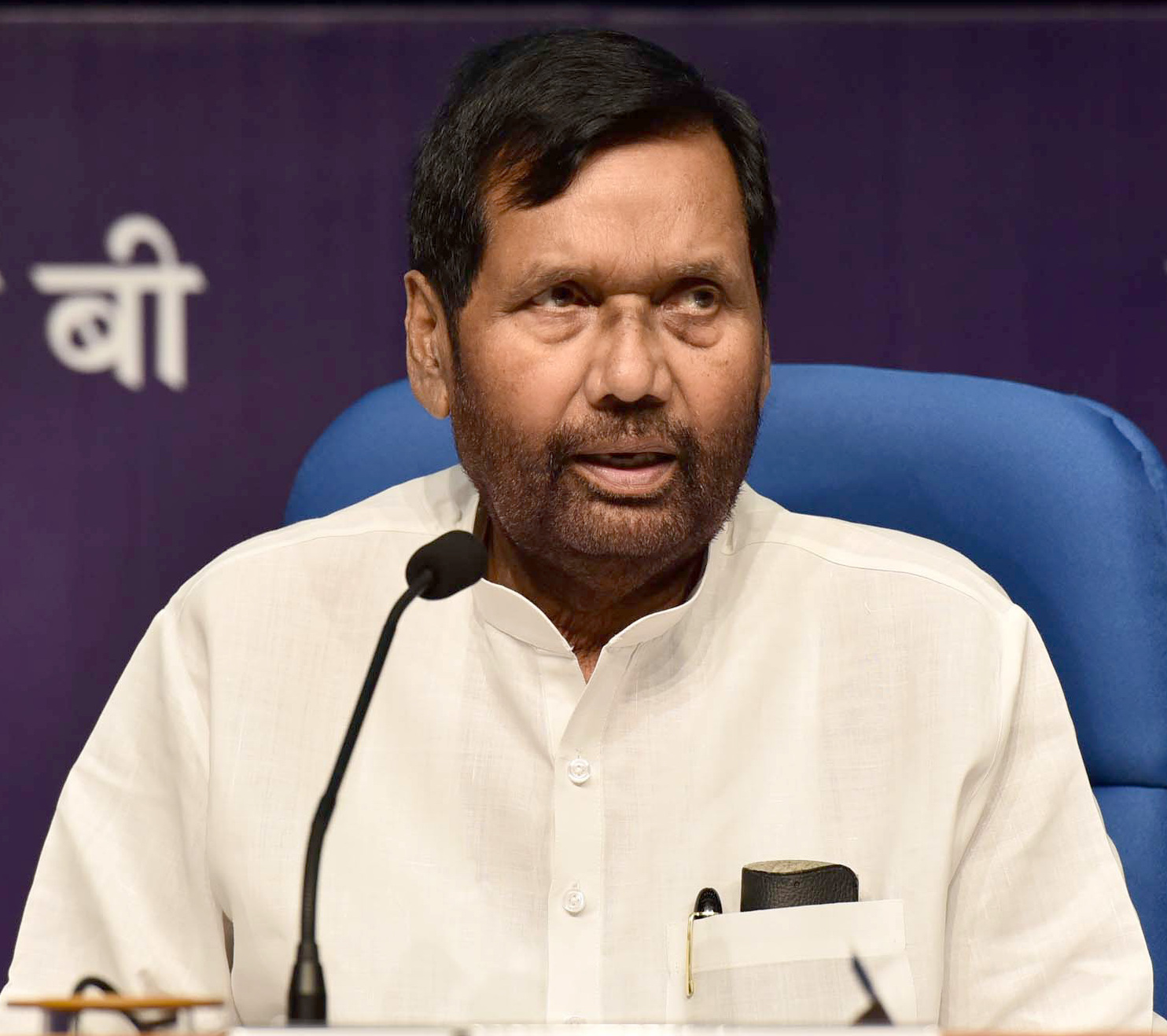
	First party	Second party
Leader	Sheila Dikshit	Vijay Kumar Malhotra
Party	INC	BJP
Leader's seat	New Delhi	Greater Kailash
Seats before	47	20
Seats won	43	23
Seat change	▼4	▲3
Popular vote	2,489,816	2,244,629
Percentage	40.31%	36.34%
Swing	▼7.82%	▲1.12%
	Third party	Fourth party
Leader	Mayawati	Ram Vilas Paswan
Party	BSP	LJP
Leader's seat	Not Contested	Not Contested
Seats before	0	0
Seats won	2	1
Seat change	▲2	▲1
Popular vote	867,672	83,185
Percentage	14.05%	1.35%
Swing	▲8.28%	▲1.95%
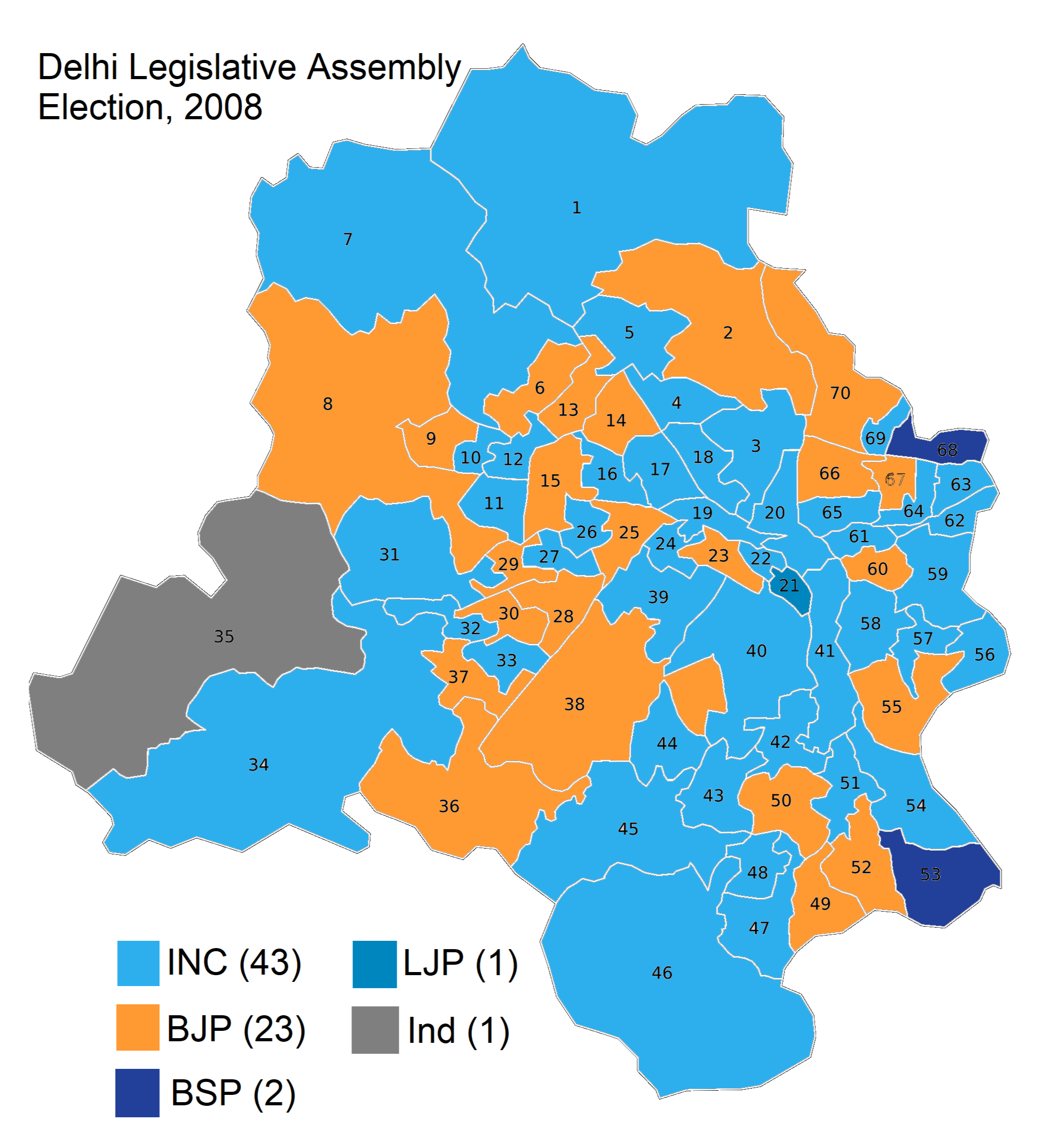
- Map of Delhi showing results of the 2008 Vidhan Sabha election
Chief Minister before election
Sheila Dikshit
INC
Elected Chief Minister
Sheila Dikshit
INC

Legislative Assembly elections were held in Delhi on 29 November 2008 to elect 70 members of the Delhi Legislative Assembly. The voter turnout for the election was 57.60% an increase by 4.18% than the previous election in 2003. The Indian National Congress won the election comfortably winning 43 of the 70 seats, while the opposition Bharatiya Janata Party managed to win 23 seats. Sheila Dikshit of the Indian National Congress was sworn in as the Chief Minister for the third consecutive time.

== Parties and Alliances ==
Alliance/Party		Flag	Symbol	Leader	Seats contested	
Indian National Congress				Sheila Dikshit	70	
NDA	Bharatiya Janata Party			Vijay Kumar Malhotra	69	70
NDA	Shiromani Akali Dal (Simranjit Singh Mann)			Avtar Singh Hit	1	70
Bahujan Samaj Party				Mayawati	70	
Lok Jan Shakti Party				Ram Vilas Paswan	41	
Samajwadi Party				Mulayam Singh Yadav	36	
Nationalist Congress Party				Sharad Pawar	16	
Rashtriya Janata Dal				Lalu Prasad Yadav	11	
Janata Dal (United)				Nitish Kumar	11	
INDEPENDENTS					357	

== Results ==
Vote Share
1. INC (40.3%)
2. BJP (36.3%)
3. BSP (14.1%)
4. Other (9.35%)

Party	Seats Contested	Seats won	Seats Changed	% Votes
Indian National Congress	70	43	▼4	40.31
Bharatiya Janata Party	70	23	▲3	36.34
Bahujan Samaj Party	70	2	▲2	14.05
Lok Janshakti Party	41	1	▲1	1.35
Independent		1		3.92
Total		70		95.97

=== Results by districts ===
District	Seats	INC	BJP	Others
North Delhi	8	6	2	0
Central Delhi	7	4	2	1
North West Delhi	7	3	4	0
West Delhi	7	3	4	0
New Delhi	6	4	2	0
South West Delhi	7	4	2	1
South East Delhi	7	4	2	1
South Delhi	5	5	0	0
East Delhi	6	4	2	0
Shahdara	5	4	1	0
North East Delhi	5	2	2	1
Total	70	43	23	4

=== Results by constituency ===
Indian National Congress
Bharatiya Janta Party
Bahujan Samaj Party
Lok Jan Shakti Party
Rashtriya Janata Dal
Independent

Assembly Constituency		Turnout (%)	Winner				Runner Up				Margin
#	Name	Turnout (%)	Candidate	Party	Votes	%	Candidate	Party	Votes	%	Margin
North Delhi District
1	Narela	56.8	Jaswant Singh	INC	34,662	31.66	Sharad Chauhan	BSP	33,830	30.90	832
Central Delhi District
2	Burari	55.9	Shri Krishan	BJP	32,006	30.10	Deepak Tyagi	INC	27,016	25.40	4,990
3	Timarpur	59.3	Surinder Pal Singh	INC	39,997	44.14	Surya Prakash Khatri	BJP	37,584	41.48	2,413
North Delhi District
4	Adarsh Nagar	59.12	Mangat Ram Singhal	INC	36,445	44.84	Ravinder Singh	BJP	31,993	39.29	4,512
5	Badli	57.1	Devender Yadav	INC	39,215	39.86	Ajesh Yadav	BSP	25,611	26.03	13,604
North West Delhi District
6	Rithala	63.4	Kulwant Rana	BJP	64,474	55.86	Shambhu Dayal Sharma	INC	38,128	32.86	26,346
North Delhi District
7	Bawana(SC)	52.6	Surender Kumar	INC	60,544	48.33	Chand Ram	BJP	43,402	34.65	17,142
North West Delhi District
8	Mundka	55	Manoj Kumar	BJP	47,355	45.83	Prem Chander Kaushik	INC	32,458	31.41	14,897
9	Kirari	57.9	Anil Jha Vats	BJP	30,005	32.73	Pushpraj	NCP	20,481	22.34	9,524
10	Sultanpur Majra(SC)	61.9	Jai Kishan	INC	39,542	48.19	Nand Ram Bagri	BJP	20,867	25.73	18,675
West Delhi District
11	Nangloi Jat	55.1	Bijender Singh	INC	48,009	50.65	Raj Singh	BJP	30,449	32.12	17,650
North West Delhi District
12	Mangol Puri(SC)	64.7	Raj Kumar Chauhan	INC	50,448	54.41	Yogesh Aatray	BJP	20,585	22.20	29,863
North Delhi District
13	Rohini	58.7	Jai Bhagwan Aggarwal	BJP	56,793	62.56	Vijender Jindal	INC	30,019	33.66	26,774
North West Delhi District
14	Shalimar Bagh	58.59	Ravinder Nath Bansal	BJP	49,976	57.63	Ram Kailash Gupta	INC	30,044	34.35	19,932
North Delhi District
15	Shakur Basti	58.27	Shyam Lal Garg	BJP	40,444	50.20	S.C.Vats	INC	36,444	45.23	4,000
North West Delhi District
16	Tri Nagar	63.37	Anil Bharadwaj	INC	41,891	46.26	Nand Kishore Garg	BJP	39,222	44.09	1,969
North Delhi District
17	Wazirpur	56.69	Hari Shanker Gupta	INC	39,977	45.29	Mange Ram Garg	BJP	36,837	41.09	3,140
18	Model Town	58.53	Kanwar Karan Singh	INC	39,935	46.37	Bhola Nath Vij	BJP	36,936	43.86	2,997
Central Delhi District
19	Sadar Bazar	60.1	Rajesh Jain	INC	47,508	53.44	Jai Parkash	BJP	33,419	37.59	14,089
20	Chandni Chowk	57.2	Parlad Singh Sawhney	INC	28,207	45.61	Praveen Khandelwal	BJP	20,188	32.64	8,019
21	Matia Mahal	56.3	Shoaib Iqbal	LJP	25,474	39.56	Mehmood Zia	INC	17,870	27.75	7,807
22	Ballimaran	59.6	Haroon Yusuf	INC	34,660	42.08	Moti Lal Sodhi	BJP	28,423	34.51	6,237
23	Karol Bagh(SC)	59.71	Surender Pal Ratawal	BJP	38,746	45.71	Madan Khorwal	INC	35,338	41.69	3,408
New Delhi District
24	Patel Nagar(SC)	56.5	Rajesh Lilothia	INC	44,022	50.43	Anita Arya	BJP	34,516	39.54	9,506
West Delhi District
25	Moti Nagar	61.6	Subhash Sachdeva	BJP	46,616	54.49	Anjali Rai	INC	31,619	36.96	14,997
26	Madipur(SC)	58.4	Mala Ram Gangwal	INC	40,698	48.75	Kailash Sankla	BJP	32,166	38.53	8,532
27	Rajouri Garden	62	Dyanand Chandila	INC	31,130	37.58	Avtar Singh Hit	SAD(A)	31,084	37.53	54
28	Hari Nagar	57.2	Harsharan Singh Balli	BJP	51,364	62.67	Ramesh Lamba	INC	22,606	27.58	28,758
29	Tilak Nagar	53.5	O P Babbar	BJP	38,320	52.33	Anita Babbar	INC	26,202	35.78	12,118
30	Janakpuri	61.2	Jagdish Mukhi	BJP	50,655	57.15	Deepak Arora	INC	33,203	37.46	17,458
South West Delhi District
31	Vikaspuri	55.6	Nand Kishore	INC	47,819	34.96	Krishan Gahlot	BJP	46,876	34.27	943
32	Uttam Nagar	62.4	Mukesh Sharma	INC	46,765	46.03	Pawan Sharma	BJP	39,582	38.96	7,183
33	Dwarka	62.4	Mahabal Mishra	INC	43,608	52.33	Pradyuman Rajput	BJP	29,627	35.56	13,981
34	Matiala	58.5	Sumesh Shokeen	INC	52,411	40.14	Kamal Jeet	BJP	45,782	35.06	6,629
35	Najafgarh	59.1	Bharat Singh	IND	34,028	33.25	Kanwal Singh Yadav	INC	22,575	22.06	11,453
36	Bijwasan	59.1	Sat Prakash Rana	BJP	27,427	41.33	Vijay Singh Lochav	INC	25,422	38.31	2,005
37	Palam	58.8	Dharam Dev Solanki	BJP	40,712	44.12	Mahender Yadav	INC	28,119	30.47	12,593
New Delhi District
38	Delhi Cantonment	56.6	Karan Singh Tanwar	BJP	23,696	55.58	Ashok Ahuja	INC	16,435	38.55	7,261
39	Rajinder Nagar	52.2	Rama Kant Goswami	INC	29,394	40.78	Asha Yogi	BJP	23,988	33.28	5,406
40	New Delhi	56.22	Sheila Dikshit	INC	39,778	52.20	Vijay Jolly	BJP	25,796	39.85	13,982
South East Delhi District
41	Jangpura	59.6	Tarvinder Singh Marwah	INC	37,261	57	Manjinder Singh Sirsa	BJP	23,310	35.96	13,956
42	Kasturba Nagar	53.2	Neeraj Basoya	INC	33,807	44.40	Sushil Choudhary	BJP	31,323	41.13	2,484
South Delhi District
43	Malviya Nagar	55.9	Kiran Walia	INC	31,823	39.43	Ram Bhaj	BJP	27,553	29.93	3,730
New Delhi District
44	R K Puram	52.7	Barkha Singh	INC	35,878	53.50	Radhey Shyam Sharma	BJP	26,561	39.60	9,317
South Delhi District
45	Mehrauli	45.9	Yoganand Shastri	INC	21,740	32.83	Sher Singh Dagar	BJP	20,632	31.15	1,108
46	Chhatarpur	56	Balram Tanwar	INC	32,406	37.22	Brahm Singh Tanwar	BJP	27,476	31.52	5,030
47	Deoli(SC)	56.4	Arvinder Singh Lovely	INC	41,497	43.41	Shri Lal	BSP	24,869	26.02	16,628
48	Ambedkar Nagar(SC)	57.4	Ch Prem Singh	INC	30,467	43.19	Suresh Chand	BJP	26,630	36.34	4,837
South East Delhi District
49	Sangam Vihar	51.4	Dr Shiv Charan Lal Gupta	BJP	20,332	27.37	Amod Kumar Kanth	INC	16,743	22.54	3,589
New Delhi District
50	Greater Kailash	54.4	Vijay Kumar Malhotra	BJP	42,206	52.94	Jitender Kumar Kocher	INC	30,987	38.87	11,219
South East Delhi District
51	Kalkaji	51.3	Subhash Chopra	INC	38,360	51.91	Jai Gopal Abrol	BJP	24,971	33.79	13,389
52	Tughlakabad	55.5	Ramesh Bidhuri	BJP	32,633	40.99	Sahi Ram	BSP	24,399	30.65	8,234
53	Badarpur	56.6	Ram Singh Netaji	BSP	53,416	47.30	Ramvir Singh Bidhuri	INC	40,111	35.52	13,205
54	Okhla	49	Parvez Hashmi	INC	29,303	28.53	Asif Muhammad Khan	RJD	28,762	28	541
East Delhi District
55	Trilokpuri(SC)	59.9	Sunil Kumar	BJP	30,781	37.28	Anjana	INC	30,147	36.51	634
56	Kondli(SC)	59.6	Amrish Singh Gautam	INC	36,580	45.26	Dushyant Kumar Gautam	BJP	21,594	26.72	14,986
57	Patparganj	54.5	Anil Chaudhary	INC	36,984	42.40	Nakul Bharadwaj	BJP	36,336	41.64	663
58	Laxmi Nagar	56.5	Dr. Ashok Kumar Walia	INC	54,352	59.58	Murari Singh Panwar	INC	31,855	34.99	22,397
Shahdara District
59	Vishwas Nagar	58.9	Naseeb Singh	INC	48,805	51.09	Om Prakash Sharma	BJP	39,176	41.01	9,629
East Delhi District
60	Krishna Nagar	61.6	Harsh Vardhan	BJP	47,852	45.50	Deepika Khullar	INC	44,648	42.45	3,204
61	Gandhi Nagar	63.5	Arvinder Singh Lovely	INC	59,795	64.25	Kamal Kumar Jain	BJP	27,870	29.94	31,923
Shahdara District
62	Shahdara	57.1	Dr Narender Nath	INC	39,194	44.89	Jitender Singh Shunty	BJP	37,658	43.13	1,536
63	Seemapuri(SC)	62.3	Veer Singh Dhingan	INC	43,864	49.13	Chandra Pal Singh	BJP	24,604	27.56	19,261
64	Rohtas Nagar	61.1	Ram Babu Sharma	INC	45,802	46.42	Alok Kumar	BJP	32,559	32.99	13,243
North East Delhi District
65	Seelampur	58	Chaudhary Mateen Ahmed	INC	47,820	54.65	Sita Ram Gupta	BJP	21,546	24.62	26,574
66	Ghonda	57.5	Sahab Singh Chauhan	BJP	35,226	38.46	Bheeshma Sharma	INC	34,646	37.82	580
Shahdara District
67	Babarpur	59.7	Naresh Gaur	BJP	31,954	35.1	Hazi Dilashad Ali	BSP	28,128	30.9	3,826
North East Delhi District
68	Gokalpur(SC)	61.6	Surendra Kumar	BSP	27,499	28.89	Balzor Singh	INC	24,442	25.68	3,057
69	Mustafabad	58	Hasan Ahmed	INC	39,838	40.70	Yogender Kumar Sharma	BJP	38,859	39.69	979
70	Karawal Nagar	53.2	Mohan Singh Bisht	BJP	43,980	42.80	Satan Pal Dayma	IND	22,852	22.24	21,128

== See also ==
- First Legislative Assembly of Delhi
- Second Legislative Assembly of Delhi
- Third Legislative Assembly of Delhi
- Fourth Legislative Assembly of Delhi
- Fifth Legislative Assembly of Delhi
- Sixth Legislative Assembly of Delhi
