= 5th Delhi Assembly =

Fifth Legislative Assembly of Delhi

Legislative Assembly of Delhi (Vidhan Sabha of Delhi)

Type
- Type: Unicameral
- Term limits: 5 year

History
- Founded: Dec 2013
- Disbanded: Feb 2014
- Preceded by: 4th Delhi Assembly
- Succeeded by: 6th Delhi Assembly

Leadership
- Chief Minister: Arvind Kejriwal, AAP
- Speaker of the Assembly: Maninder Singh Dhir, AAP
- Leader of the Opposition: Dr. Harsh Vardhan, BJP

Structure
- Seats: 70
- Political groups: Government (36) AAP (28) Confidence and supply INC (8) Official Opposition (32) BJP (31) SAD (1) Other Opposition (2) JD(U) (1) Independent (1)

Elections
- Voting system: FPTP
- Last election: Dec 2013

Meeting place
- Old Secretariat, Delhi, India

Website
- www.delhiassembly.nic.in

The Fifth Legislative Assembly of Delhi was constituted on 28 December 2013 after the Delhi Legislative Assembly elections on 4 December 2013.

== Election and Government formation ==
Total six national parties, eleven state parties, sixty registered (unrecognised) parties and other independent candidates contested for 70 assembly seats. With 31 seats, BJP emerged as the single largest party but fell short of the half-way mark required for a simple majority. BJP was closely followed by AAP, which won 28 seats. In absence of clear majority, Legislative Assembly of Delhi was hung. Being the single largest party, BJP approached the Lieutenant Governor of Delhi Najeeb Jung and refused to form a government. Thereafter, Indian National Congress, which had won eight seats, offered "unconditional" support to the AAP. AAP initially rejected INC's support but later accepted it and formed the government with Arvind Kejriwal as the Chief Minister.

== Electors ==
	Male	Female	Others	Total
Electors	6,614,238	5,321,572	550	11,936,360
Electors who voted	4,367,527	3,466,248	144	7,833,919
Polling percentage	66.03%	65.14%	26%	65.53%

== Candidates ==
	Male	Female	Others	Total
Candidates	739	71	0	810
Elected	67	3	0	70
Forfeited deposits	555	57	0	612

== Important members ==
#	From	To	Position	Name	Party
01	2013	2014	Leader of the House (Chief Minister)	Arvind Kejriwal	AAP
02	2013	2014	Speaker	Maninder Singh Dhir	AAP
03	2013	2014	Deputy Speaker	-	-
04	2013	2014	Leader of the Opposition	Dr. Harsh Vardhan	BJP

== List of members ==
Default sort, in ascending order of constituency.

#	Assembly constituency	Name	Party	Comments
01	Adarsh Nagar	Ram Kishan Singhal	BJP	
02	Ambedkar Nagar (SC)	Ashok Kumar Chauhan	AAP	Joined BJP
03	Babarpur	Naresh Gaur	BJP	
04	Badarpur	Ramvir Singh Bidhuri	BJP	
05	Badli	Devender Yadav	INC	
06	Ballimaran	Haroon Yusuf	INC	
07	Bawana (SC)	Gugan Singh	BJP	
08	Bijwasan	Sat Prakash Rana	BJP	
09	Burari	Sanjeev Jha	AAP	
10	Chandni Chowk	Parlad Singh Sawhney	INC	
11	Chhatarpur	Brahm Singh Tanwar	BJP	
12	Delhi Cantt	Surinder Singh	AAP	
13	Deoli (SC)	Prakash Jarwal	AAP	
14	Dwarka	Parduymn Rajput	BJP	
15	Gandhi Nagar	Arvinder Singh Lovely	INC	
16	Ghonda	Sahab Singh Chauhan	BJP	
17	Gokalpur (SC)	Ranjeet Singh	BJP	
18	Greater Kailash	Saurabh Bharadwaj	AAP	
19	Hari Nagar	Jagdeep Singh	AAP	
20	Janakpuri	Prof. Jagdish Mukhi	BJP	
21	Jangpura	Maninder Singh Dhir	AAP	
22	Kalkaji	Harmeet Singh Kalka	BJP	
23	Karawal Nagar	Mohan Singh Bisht	BJP	
24	Karol Bagh (SC)	Vishesh Ravi	AAP	
25	Kasturba Nagar	Madan Lal	AAP	
26	Kirari	Anil Jha Vats	BJP	
27	Kondli	Manoj Kumar	AAP	
28	Krishna Nagar	Dr. Harsh Vardhan	BJP	
29	Laxmi Nagar	Vinod Kumar Binny	AAP	Expelled from AAP
30	Madipur (SC)	Girish Soni	AAP	
31	Malviya Nagar	Somnath Bharti	AAP	
32	Mangol Puri (SC)	Rakhi Birla	AAP	
33	Matia Mahal	Shoaib Iqbal	JD (U)	
34	Matiala	Rajesh Gahlot	BJP	
35	Mehrauli	Parvesh Sahib Singh	BJP	
36	Model Town	Akhilesh Pati Tripathi	AAP	
37	Moti Nagar	Subhash Sachdeva	BJP	
38	Mundka	Rambir Shokeen	IND	
39	Mustafabad	Hasan Ahmed	INC	
40	Najafgarh	Ajeet Singh Kharkhari	BJP	
41	Nangloi Jat	Manoj Kumar Shokeen	BJP	
42	Nerela	Neel Daman Khatri	BJP	
43	New Delhi	Arvind Kejriwal	AAP	
44	Okhla	Asif Muhammad Khan	INC	
45	Palam	Dharm Dev Solanki	BJP	
46	Patel Nagar (SC)	Veena Anand	AAP	
47	Patparganj	Manish Sisodia	AAP	
48	R. K. Puram	Anil Kumar Sharma	BJP	
49	Rajinder Nagar	R. P. Singh	BJP	
50	Rajouri Garden	Manjinder Singh Sirsa	SAD	
51	Rithala	Kulwant Rana	BJP	
52	Rohini	Rajesh Garg	AAP	
53	Rohtas Nagar	Jitender Mahajan	BJP	
54	Sadar Bazar	Som Dutt	AAP	
55	Sangam Vihar	Dinesh Mohaniya	AAP	
56	Seelampur	Mateen Ahmad	INC	
57	Seemapuri (SC)	Dharmender Singh	AAP	
58	Shahdara	Jitender Singh Shunty	BJP	
59	Shakur Basti	Satyendra Kumar Jain	AAP	
60	Shalimar Bagh	Bandana Kumari	AAP	
61	Sultanpur (SC)	Jai Kishan	INC	
62	Tilak Nagar	Jarnail Singh	AAP	
63	Timarpur	Harish Khanna	AAP	
64	Tri Nagar	Nand Kishore Garg	BJP	
65	Trilokpuri (SC)	Raju Dhingan	AAP	
66	Tughlakabad	Ramesh Bidhuri	BJP	
67	Uttam Nagar	Pawan Sharma	BJP	
68	Vikaspuri	Mahinder Yadav	AAP	
69	Vishwas Nagar	Om Prakash Sharma	BJP	
70	Wazirpur	Dr. Mahander Nagpal	BJP	

== Resignation and dissolution ==
On 14 February 2014, Arvind Kejriwal, after 49 days as Chief Minister resigned alleging that INC and BJP obstructed the Jan Lokpal Bill. Both, the INC and BJP refuted the allegations made by Kejriwal. The outgoing Chief Minister, vide a letter to President of India Pranab Mukherjee and Lieutenant Governor of Delhi Najeeb Jung recommended immediate dissolution of the State Assembly and to conduct elections immediately.

The Legislative Assembly of Delhi was finally dissolved on 04 Nov 2014 and subsequently elections were announced by Election Commission of India.

== See also ==
- First Legislative Assembly of Delhi
- Second Legislative Assembly of Delhi
- Third Legislative Assembly of Delhi
- Fourth Legislative Assembly of Delhi
- Sixth Legislative Assembly of Delhi
- Government of Delhi
- Legislative Assembly of Delhi
- 1993, 1998, 2003, 2008, 2013 & 2015 Delhi Legislative Assembly elections.
- Government of India
- Politics of India
- 2013 Delhi Legislative Assembly election
