= Narayan Dutt Sharma =

Indian politician

MLA, Sixth Legislative Assembly of Delhi
- In office February 2015 – February 2020
- Preceded by: Ramvir Singh Bidhuri
- Succeeded by: Ramvir Singh Bidhuri
- Constituency: Badarpur

Personal details
- Born: 15 December 1972 (age 53) Mathura district
- Party: Bharatiya Janata Party
- Other political affiliations: Bahujan Samaj Party
- Education: n/a
- Profession: Politician & businessperson

Narayan Dutt Sharma (born 15 December 1972) is an Indian politician and a member of the Sixth Legislative Assembly of Delhi in India. He represents the Badarpur constituency of New Delhi.

== Early life and education ==
Narayan Dutt Sharma was born in Mathura district. He has received education till twelfth grade.

== Political career ==
Narayan Dutt Sharma has been a MLA for one term. He represented the Badarpur constituency and was a member of the Aam Aadmi Party political party. Prior to this, he had contested from the same constituency in the year 2013 but had lost the election to Ramvir Singh Bidhuri.

== Posts held ==
#	From	To	Position	Comments
01	2015	2020	Member, Sixth Legislative Assembly of Delhi	

== See also ==
- Aam Aadmi Party
- Delhi Legislative Assembly
- Politics of India
- Rithala (Delhi Assembly constituency)
- Sixth Legislative Assembly of Delhi
