= 6th Delhi Assembly =

Sixth Legislative Assembly of Delhi

6th Legislative Assembly of Delhi

Type
- Type: Unicameral
- Term limits: 5 year

History
- Founded: Feb 2015
- Disbanded: Jan 2020
- Preceded by: 5th Delhi Assembly
- Succeeded by: 7th Delhi Assembly

Leadership
- Speaker of the Assembly: Ram Niwas Goel, AAP
- Dy. Speaker: Rakhi Birla, AAP
- Chief Minister: Arvind Kejriwal, AAP
- Leader of the House: Arvind Kejriwal, AAP
- Leader of the Opposition: Vijender Gupta, BJP
- Secretary: P. N. Mishra

Structure
- Seats: 70
- Political groups: between 2015-2017 AAP: 67 seats BJP: 3 seats
- Political groups: Since Aug 2017 AAP: 66 seats BJP: 4 seats
- Length of term: 5 years

Elections
- Voting system: First-past-the-post
- Last election: 7 February 2015
- Next election: 2020

Meeting place
- Old Secretariat, Delhi, India

Website
- www.delhiassembly.nic.in

The Sixth Legislative Assembly of Delhi was constituted on 14 February 2015 after the 2015 Delhi Legislative Assembly elections were concluded earlier that month. Second Kejriwal ministry was the cabinet during the term of 6th Delhi Assembly.

== History ==
Elections for 70 assembly seats of the Delhi Legislative Assembly were concluded on 7 February 2015 and results were announced on 10 February 2015. The Aam Aadmi Party got a sweeping majority by winning 67 out of 70 seats. The Bharatiya Janata Party managed only 3 seats and all other parties, including the Indian National Congress, could not manage to win any seats. AAP got 54.3% (4,879,127), BJP got 32.2% (2,891,510) and INC got 9.7% (867,027) of the total votes polled. A total of 6 national parties, 10 state parties, 55 registered (unrecognised) parties and 1 independent candidate contested for the 70 assembly seats.

On 14 February 2015, Arvind Kejriwal was sworn in as the eighth Chief Minister of Delhi. Along with Kejriwal, six ministers were also sworn in the Second Kejriwal ministry.

In April 2015, the speaker of the house recognized Vijender Gupta as the leader of opposition in the house.

Jarnail Singh from Aam Aadmi Party resigned on 6 January 2017 to contest against sitting Punjab CM Parkash Singh Badal. Shiromani Akali Dal party member Manjinder Singh Sirsa contested on a BJP ticket and won the Rajouri Garden assembly constituency in Feb 2017 By Poll Election.

AAP won the Bawana assembly constituency in the August 2017 by-polls.

As on 28 August 2017, AAP had 66 MLA, 4 belongs to BJP.

== Office holders ==
#	From	To	Position	Name	Party
01	2015	Incumbent	Chief Minister	Arvind Kejriwal	AAP
02	2015	Incumbent	Speaker	Ram Niwas Goel	AAP
03	2015	Incumbent	Deputy Speaker	Rakhi Birla	AAP
04	2015	Incumbent	Leader of the Opposition	Vijender Gupta	BJP

== Committees ==
Chairman, (2015–2020) The Estimates Committee: Dinesh Mohaniya.

== List of members ==
No.	Constituency	Name of elected MLA	Party affiliation	Notes
01	Adarsh Nagar	Pawan Kumar Sharma	AAP	
02	Ambedkar Nagar (SC)	Ajay Dutt	AAP	
03	Babarpur	Gopal Rai	AAP	
04	Badarpur	Narayan Dutt Sharma	AAP	
05	Badli	Ajesh Yadav	AAP	
06	Ballimaran	Imran Hussain	AAP	
07	Bawana (SC)	Ram Chander	AAP	
08	Bijwasan	Devinder Sehrawat	AAP	
09	Burari	Sanjeev Jha	AAP	
10	Chandni Chowk	Alka Lamba	AAP	
11	Chhatarpur	Kartar Singh Tanwar	AAP	
12	Delhi Cantt	Surinder Singh	AAP	
13	Deoli (SC)	Prakash Jarwal	AAP	
14	Dwarka	Adarsh Shastri	AAP	
15	Gandhi Nagar	Anil Kumar Bajpai	AAP	
16	Ghonda	Shri Dutt Sharma	AAP	
17	Gokalpur (SC)	Fateh Singh	AAP	
18	Greater Kailash	Saurabh Bharadwaj	AAP	
19	Hari Nagar	Jagdeep Singh	AAP	
20	Janakpuri	Rajesh Rishi	AAP	
21	Jangpura	Praveen Kumar	AAP	
22	Kalkaji	Avtar Singh	AAP	
23	Karawal Nagar	Kapil Mishra	AAP	
24	Karol Bagh (SC)	Vishesh Ravi	AAP	
25	Kasturba Nagar	Madan Lal	AAP	
26	Kirari	Rituraj Govind	AAP	
27	Kondli (SC)	Manoj Kumar	AAP	
28	Krishna Nagar	S.K. Bagga	AAP	
29	Laxmi Nagar	Nitin Tyagi	AAP	
30	Madipur (SC)	Girish Soni	AAP	
31	Malviya Nagar	Somnath Bharti	AAP	
32	Mangol Puri (SC)	Rakhi Birla	AAP	
33	Matia Mahal	Asim Ahmed Khan	AAP	
34	Matiala	Gulab Singh	AAP	
35	Mehrauli	Naresh Yadav	AAP	
36	Model Town	Akhilesh Pati Tripathi	AAP	
37	Moti Nagar	Shiv Charan Goel	AAP	
38	Mundka	Sukhvir Singh	AAP	
39	Mustafabad	Jagdish Pradhan	BJP	
40	Najafgarh	Kailash Gahlot	AAP	
41	Nangloi Jat	Raghuvinder Shokeen	AAP	
42	Nerela	Sharad Kumar	AAP	
43	New Delhi	Arvind Kejriwal	AAP	
44	Okhla	Amanatullah Khan	AAP	
45	Palam	Bhavna Gaur	AAP	
46	Patel Nagar (SC)	Hazari Lal Chauhan	AAP	
47	Patparganj	Manish Sisodia	AAP	
48	R.K. Puram	Parmila Tokas	AAP	
49	Rajinder Nagar	Vijender Garg Vijay	AAP	
50	Rajouri Garden	Jarnail Singh	AAP	Resigned on 6 January 2017 to contest against sitting PJ CM Parkash Singh Badal
50	Rajouri Garden	Manjinder Singh Sirsa	BJP	Won by-election
51	Rithala	Mohinder Goyal	AAP	
52	Rohini	Vijender Gupta	BJP	
53	Rohtas Nagar	Sarita Singh	AAP	
54	Sadar Bazar	Som Dutt	AAP	
55	Sangam Vihar	Dinesh Mohaniya	AAP	
56	Seelampur	Mohammad Ishraque	AAP	
57	Seemapuri (SC)	Rajendra Pal Gautam	AAP	
58	Shahdara	Ram Niwas Goel	AAP	
59	Shakur Basti	Satyendra Kumar Jain	AAP	
60	Shalimar Bagh	Bandana Kumari	AAP	
61	Sultan Pur Majra (SC)	Sandeep Kumar	AAP	
62	Tilak Nagar	Jarnail Singh	AAP	
63	Timarpur	Pankaj Pushkar	AAP	
64	Tri Nagar	Jitender Singh Tomar	AAP	
65	Trilokpuri (SC)	Raju Dhingan	AAP	
66	Tughlakabad	Sahi Ram	AAP	
67	Uttam Nagar	Naresh Balyan	AAP	
68	Vikaspuri	Mahinder Yadav	AAP	
69	Vishwas Nagar	Om Prakash Sharma	BJP	
70	Wazirpur	Rajesh Gupta	AAP	

== See also ==
- First Legislative Assembly of Delhi
- Second Legislative Assembly of Delhi
- Third Legislative Assembly of Delhi
- Fourth Legislative Assembly of Delhi
- Fifth Legislative Assembly of Delhi
- Seventh Legislative Assembly of Delhi
- Government of Delhi
- Legislative Assembly of Delhi
- 1993, 1998, 2003, 2008, 2013 & 2015 Delhi Legislative Assembly elections.
- Government of India
- Politics of India
