= Yoganand Shastri =

Indian politician (born 1944)

5th Speaker of Delhi Legislative Assembly
- In office 2008–2013
- Lieutenant Governor: Tejendra Khanna
- Preceded by: Chaudhary Prem Singh
- Succeeded by: Maninder Singh Dhir

Member of Delhi Legislative Assembly
- In office 2008–2013
- Constituency: Mehrauli
- In office 1998–2008
- Constituency: Malviya Nagar

Personal details
- Born: 17 April 1944 (age 82)
- Party: Indian National Congress (since 2024; till 2021)
- Other political affiliations: Nationalist Congress Party (Sharadchandra Pawar) (2023-2024); Nationalist Congress Party (2021-2023)
- Occupation: Politician

Yoganand Shastri (born 17 April 1944) is an Indian politician from Delhi. He thrice served as member of Delhi Legislative Assembly. He also served as the Speaker of Delhi Legislative Assembly from 2008 to 2013. He was a cabinet minister for Development, Food and Civil Supplies in First Dikshit cabinet and Minister for Health and Social Welfare in Second Dikshit cabinet. He twice represented Malviya Nagar Assembly constituency and one time Mehrauli Assembly constituency. He entered the Nationalist Congress Party in November 2021 in the presence of party chief Sharad Pawar and later joined congress in 2024.

== Positions held ==
Year	Description
1998 - 2003	Elected to 2nd Delhi Assembly for Malviya Nagar: Cabinet Minister for Development, Food and Civil Supplies
2003 - 2008	Elected to 3rd Delhi Assembly for Malviya Nagar (2nd term): Cabinet Minister for Health and Social Welfare
2008 - 2013	Elected to 4th Delhi Assembly for Mehrauli (3rd term): Speaker of the Delhi Legislative Assembly

== Electoral Performances ==
Year	Constituency	Result	Vote percentage	Opposition Candidate	Opposition Party	Opposition vote percentage
1993	Malviya Nagar	Lost	42.41%	Rajendra Gupta	BJP	42.99%
1998	Malviya Nagar	Won	55.19%	Rajendra Gupta	BJP	40.97%
2003	Malviya Nagar	Won	48.10%	Monika Arora	BJP	39.56%
2008	Mehrauli	Won	32.83%	Sher Singh Dagar	BJP	31.15%
2013	Mehrauli	Lost	22.21%	Parvesh Sahib Singh	BJP	38.72%
2015	Malviya Nagar	Lost	5.96%	Somnath Bharti	AAP	54.98%
