= Tajdar Babar =

Indian politician (1936–2021)

Member Legislative Assembly of Delhi
- In office 1993–2008
- Constituency: Minto Road

Deputy Chairperson Delhi Metropolitan Council
- In office 1983–1989

Member Delhi Metropolitan Council
- In office 1983–1989

Personal details
- Born: 17 August 1936
- Died: 2 October 2021 (aged 85) Malviya Nagar, Delhi, India

Tajdar Babar (18 August 1936 – 2 October 2021) was an Indian politician who was elected to the First, Second and Third Legislative Assembly of Delhi. She was a member of the Indian National Congress and represented Minto Road (Assembly constituency) of Delhi.

Babar died on 2 October 2021 in Delhi.
