= Dayanand Chandila =

Member of legislative assembly in Delhi

Delhi Legislative Assembly
- In office 2008–2013
- Preceded by: Ramesh Lamba
- Succeeded by: Manjinder Singh Sirsa
- Constituency: Rajouri Garden
- In office 2003–2008
- Preceded by: Mahinder Singh Saathi
- Succeeded by: district dissolved
- Constituency: Vishnu Garden

Personal details
- Born: 1954 (age 71–72) Khyala, New Delhi, India
- Citizenship: Indian
- Party: Indian National Congress
- Other political affiliations: Bharatiya Janata Party (until 2008)
- Spouse: Dhanwati Chandela
- Children: Meghraj, Priya
- Relatives: Meenakshi (Daughter-in-law)

Dayanand Chandila (born 1954) is an Indian politician who served in the third and fourth Delhi legislative assemblies from 2003 to 2013.

== Early life and education ==
Dayanand Chandila was born in 1954 and grew up in village Khyala, Delhi in a Gurjar Landlord Family. He gained his education from New Delhi and Uttar Pradesh. After his graduation he did a three-year diploma in NEHM, NTS.

== Career ==
Before entering politics in 1989, Dr. Chandila was a non-technical supervisor in Delhi Development Authority's engineering department. He quit in 1986. He belongs to a family of landlords so money was never an issue for him. He entered politics because he was interested in welfare and growth of his fellow villagers. After some time, he realised that he should be in the system to achieve his goal. He unsuccessfully contested as an independent candidate from Vishnu Garden Assembly seat in 1993 and 1998 and came runner up.

Dr. Dayanand Chandila and his family have contested five elections from the same constituency in Delhi. He has won multiple times, often by significant vote margins, reflecting consistent support from a segment of the electorate.

- In the Year 1997, Dr. Chandila and his wife Sm. Dhanwati Chandila both contested the Municipal Corporation of Delhi (M.C.D.) election and won with huge margin as independent candidates from Vishnu Nagar and Guru Nanak Nagar wards respectively. For this feat, their names were recorded in the Guinness Book as the only married couple to win from different wards in the same elections.
- In the Year 2002, Dr. Dayanand Chandila and his wife again contested on Jharkhand Mukti Morcha Ticket for M.C.D. elections and re-elected with huge margins.
- In the Year 2003 - Dr. Dayanand Chandila joined BJP and contested for Delhi legislative election and he won with huge margin against Mahinder Singh Sathi from Vishnu Garden Assembly seat because of the work done by him and his family members in the area as M.C.D. Councillors.
- In the Year 2004 - Dr. Dayanand Chandila got his son Mehghraj into politics, BJP denied him the ticket but he also got elected as independent candidate in M.C.D. Elections. The MCD ward got vacated because Dayanand Chandila was elected as an MLA in 2003.
- In the Year 2007- Dr. Dayanand Chandila's son Meghraj and his daughter in law Meenakshi Chandila contested the M.C.D. election from Vishnu Garden and Khyala ward which are the part of Rajouri Garden Constituency. They both won with the huge margins on Jharkhand Mukti Morcha ticket, because of the great work done by Chandila family in all these years in social services.
- In the Year 2008, Dr. Chandila again changed his party and joined Congress and got elected as an MLA from Rajouri Garden Assembly seat.
- In 2012 MCD Elections, Meghraj Chandela (Son) and Meenakshi Chandila (Daughter in law) of Dr Dayanand Chandila were elected from Khyala and Vishnu Garden wards of MCD.
- In 2013, 2015 election of Rajouri Garden Assembly, Chandila family lost as INC candidates.
- In year 2017, Dr Chandila's daughter Priya Chandila won from Khyala Ward in MCD Elections.
- In 2017 Rajouri Garden By election Chandila's daughter -in-law Meenakshi Chandela lost.
- In the year 2020, Dr Dayanand Chandila joined Aam Aadmi Party and his wife Dhanwati Chandela got elected from Rajouri Garden Assembly seat with huge margin.

== Posts held ==
#	From	To	Position	District
01	2008	2013	Member, Fourth Legislative Assembly of Delhi	Rajouri Garden
02	2003	2008	Member, Third Legislative Assembly of Delhi	Vishnu Garden
03	2002	2003	Councillor, Municipal Corporation of Delhi	Vishnu Garden
04	1997	2002	Councillor, Municipal Corporation of Delhi	Vishnu Garden
