= Sukhvir Singh =

Indian politician

Sukhvir Singh is an Indian politician and is member of the Sixth Legislative Assembly of Delhi. He is a member of the Aam Aadmi Party and represents Mundka (Assembly constituency) of Delhi.

== Posts held ==
#	From	To	Position	Comments
01	2015	-	Member, Sixth Legislative Assembly of Delhi	

== See also ==
- Sixth Legislative Assembly of Delhi
- Delhi Legislative Assembly
- Government of India
- Politics of India
- Aam Aadmi Party
