= Mateen Ahmed =

Indian politician

Chaudhary Mateen Ahmed Ex MLA

Member of the Delhi Legislative Assembly for Seelampur
- In office 1993–2015
- Preceded by: N/A
- Succeeded by: Mohammad Ishraque
- Incumbent
- Assumed office 2025

Personal details
- Born: 5 November 1958 (age 67) Todarpur Village, Ghaziabad District, Uttar Pradesh
- Party: Aam Aadmi Party
- Spouse: Suraiya Begum
- Children: Three Sons
- Parent: Chaudhary Mehfooz Ali
- Profession: Businessman

Chaudhary Mateen Ahmed (born 5 November 1958) is an Indian politician from Delhi belonging to the Aam Aadmi Party. He was a Member of the Delhi Legislative Assembly from Seelampur Vidhan Sabha constituency. He was reelected in 2013 as an MLA from Seelampur constituency, defeating Kaushal Kumar Mishra (BJP) by 21,728 votes.

== Early life ==
Mateen was born to Chaudhary Mehfooz Ali at Todarpur Village, Hapur District, Uttar Pradesh. In 1976, he completed his graduation in arts from Kishan Degree College, Simbhawali, Meerut University.

== Political career ==
=== Vidhan Sabha elections ===
Mateen was elected to the Delhi Legislative Assembly for the first time in 1993 from Seelampur constituency in Delhi representing Janata Dal, defeating Jai Kishan Dass Gupta of the Bharatiya Janata Party by 1,438 votes. In 1996, he left Janata Dal and joined Indian National Congress but was denied a ticket for the 1998 Delhi Legislative Assembly election. So he ran as an independent candidate and defeated Data Ram of the BJP by 16,375 votes. In 2003 and 2008, he was elected again for the Third and Fourth Legislative Assembly of Delhi on a Congress ticket, defeating Sanjay Kumar Jain of BJP by 21,712 votes and Sita Ram Gupta, also of BJP by 26,277 votes, respectively.

=== 2013 elections ===
In 2013, he was elected again for the Fifth Legislative Assembly of Delhi, defeating Kaushal Kumar Mishra (BJP) by 21,728 votes. Mateen Ahmed was selected as a pro tem speaker of the Delhi assembly, 2013.

=== Delhi Wakf council ===
He was elected as a chairman of the Delhi Wakf Board in November 2004, succeeding Haroon Yusuf. In 2009, he was re-elected again for the chairman of the Delhi Wakf Board.

== Positions held ==
Year	Description
1993	Elected to 1st Delhi Assembly: Member, Committee on Welfare of SC/ST & OBC (1994-1998)
1998	Elected to 2nd Delhi Assembly (2nd term): Member, Committee on Question & Reference (1999-2002); Member, Committee on Welfare of SC/ST & OBC (2002-2003)
2003	Elected to 3rd Delhi Assembly (3rd term): Chairman, Committee on Papers Laid on the table (2004-2009); Member, Committee on Question & Reference (2004-2009); Member, Committee on Government Undertaking (2006-2009)
2008	Elected to 4th Delhi Assembly (4th term): Chairman, Committee on Estimates (2009-2010); Member, Committee on Question & Reference (2009-2010); Member, Committee on Privileges (2009-2010); Member, Committee on Papers Laid on the table (2009-2010)
2013	Elected to 5th Delhi Assembly (5th term)
2025	Elected to Delhi Assembly (6th term)

== Personal life ==
Chaudhary Mateen has been married to Suraiya Begum; they have three sons. First son Zubair Ahmed is also in Politics, second son owns garment showroom in Delhi & his youngest son is working with Zee Media.
