= Badarpur, Delhi Assembly constituency =

Legislative assembly seat in Delhi

Coordinates: 28.512°N 77.298°E

Badarpur
- Constituency No. 53 for the Delhi Legislative Assembly

Constituency details
- Country: India
- Region: North India
- State: Delhi
- District: South East Delhi
- Lok Sabha constituency: South Delhi
- Reservation: None

Member of Legislative Assembly
- 8th Delhi Legislative Assembly
- Incumbent Ram Singh Netaji
- Party: Aam Aadmi Party
- Elected year: 2025

Badarpur Assembly constituency is one of the 70 legislative assembly constituencies of Delhi in northern India.

== Overview ==
The present geographical structure of Badarpur constituency came into existence in 2008 as a part of the implementation of the recommendations of the Delimitation Commission of India constituted in 2002. Badarpur is part of South Delhi Lok Sabha constituency along with nine other Assembly segments, namely, Bijwasan, Sangam Vihar, Ambedkar Nagar, Chhatarpur, Deoli, Kalkaji, Tughlakabad, Palam and Mehrauli.

== Members of the Legislative Assembly ==
Election	Name	Party
1993	Ramvir Singh Bidhuri	Janata Dal
1998	Ram Singh Netaji	Independent
2003	Ramvir Singh Bidhuri	Nationalist Congress Party
Major boundary changes
2008	Ram Singh Netaji	Bahujan Samaj Party
2013	Ramvir Singh Bidhuri	Bharatiya Janata Party
2015	Narayan Dutt Sharma	Aam Aadmi Party
2020	Ramvir Singh Bidhuri	Bharatiya Janata Party
2025	Ram Singh Netaji	Aam Aadmi Party

== Election results ==
=== 2025 ===
Delhi Assembly elections, 2025: Badarpur
Party	Candidate	Votes	%	±%
AAP	Ram Singh Netaji	112,991	54.30	+9.19
BJP	Narayan Dutt Sharma	87,103	41.86	− 5.19
INC	Arjun Bhadana	3,145	1.51	
Majority		25,888	12.44	
Turnout				
AAP gain from BJP		Swing		

=== 2020 ===
Delhi Assembly elections, 2020: Badarpur
Party	Candidate	Votes	%	±%
BJP	Ramvir Singh Bidhuri	90,082	47.05	+19.58
AAP	Ram Singh Netaji	86,363	45.11	−10.37
BSP	Narayan Dutt Sharma	10,436	5.45	+0.70
INC	Pramod Kumar Yadav	1,615	0.84	−9.98
NOTA	None of the above	750	0.39	+0.06
CPI(M)	Jagdish Chand	683	0.36	
Majority		3,719	1.94	−26.07
Turnout		1,91,540	59.57	−5.76
BJP gain from AAP		Swing	+14.98	

=== 2015 ===
Delhi Assembly elections, 2015: Badarpur
Party	Candidate	Votes	%	±%
AAP	Narayan Dutt Sharma	94,242	55.48	+39.75
BJP	Ramvir Singh Bidhuri	46,659	27.47	−6.76
INC	Ram Singh Netaji	18,390	10.82	−12.95
BSP	Nar Singh Shah	8,082	4.75	−18.16
NOTA	None of the above	562	0.33	−0.20
Majority		47,583	28.01	+17.55
Turnout		1,70,443	65.33	
AAP gain from BJP		Swing	+23.26	

=== 2013 ===
Delhi Assembly elections, 2013: Badarpur
Party	Candidate	Votes	%	±%
BJP	Ramvir Singh Bidhuri	43,544	34.23	+20.40
INC	Ram Singh Netaji	31,490	23.77	−11.75
BSP	Nar Singh Shah	30,346	22.91	−24.39
AAP	Narayan Dutt Sharma	20,833	15.73	
Independent	Om Prakash Gupta	1,275	0.96	+0.03
Independent	Lal Devendra Singh Chauhan	448	0.34	
RLD	Kalyan Singh Maan	422	0.32	
Independent	Ram Nath Sharma	271	0.20	
Independent	Yash Pal Singh	258	0.19	
IJP	Yogesh	243	0.18	
SP	Jay Prakash Yadav	234	0.18	−0.48
JD(U)	Champa Devi	205	0.15	−0.07
Independent	Kamta Mishra	153	0.12	
Independent	Amresh Kumar Choudhary	129	0.10	
Independent	Bijender Singh Lohia	105	0.08	
NOTA	None	704	0.53	
Majority		13,854	10.46	−1.32
Turnout		132,488	64.20	
BJP gain from BSP		Swing	+20.40	

=== 2008 ===
Delhi Assembly elections, 2008: Badarpur
Party	Candidate	Votes	%	±%
BSP	Ram Singh Netaji	53,416	47.30	+33.04
INC	Rambir Singh Bidhuri	40,111	35.52	−2.37
BJP	Khem Chand	15,621	13.83	+9.14
LJP	Binod Raj Jha	1,262	1.12	
Independent	Om Prakash Gupta	1,050	0.93	
SP	M S Khan	744	0.66	+0.46
RBCP	Ram Nath Sharma	478	0.42	
JD(U)	Virender Singh	247	0.22	−0.19
Majority		13,305	11.78	+11.36
Turnout		112,929	56.6	+9.43
BSP gain from NCP		Swing	+33.04	

=== 2003 ===
Delhi Assembly elections, 2003: Badarpur
Party	Candidate	Votes	%	±%
NCP	Rambir Singh Bidhuri	40,224	38.31	
INC	Ram Singh Netaji	39,788	37.89	+8.43
BSP	Brahm Singh	14,976	14.26	+8.57
BJP	Virender Bahadur Singh	4,923	4.69	−5.25
RJD	Gyasi Lal Sharma	1,891	1.80	
Independent	Raj Kumar	987	0.94	
Independent	Dilip Jha	444	0.42	
JD(U)	B K Tiwari	432	0.41	
Independent	Birju Nayak	415	0.40	
LP(S)	Rameshpal Singh	356	0.34	
SP	Nikhil Nanda	210	0.20	−0.50
JKNPP	Abdul Vahid	97	0.09	
RPD	Mohd Feroz Khan	93	0.09	
IJP	Nabi Hasan	86	0.08	
JPJD	Jai Prakash	83	0.08	
Majority		436	0.42	−15.62
Turnout		105,005	47.17	+2.52
NCP gain from Independent		Swing		

=== 1998 ===
Delhi Assembly elections, 1998: Badarpur
Party	Candidate	Votes	%	±%
Independent	Ram Singh Netaji	40,548	45.50	
INC	Ramvir Singh Bidhuri	26,259	29.46	+1.15
BJP	Suraj Bhan	8,858	9.94	−10.20
BSP	Chander Pal	5,075	5.69	+0.38
Independent	Inder Raj Singh	2,361	2.65	
Independent	Jivan Lal	1,938	2.17	
Independent	Sunil Kumar	1,286	1.44	
SAP	Raj Kumari Singh	880	0.99	
SP	Surjeet Singh Kasana	623	0.70	−0.57
Independent	Vinod Raj	468	0.53	
RAM	Kamal Singh	201	0.23	
SS	Raj Kumar	179	0.20	
Lok Shakti	Subash Chandra Dubey	123	0.14	
JP	Shiv Charan	111	0.12	−0.77
Independent	Bhagwan Paswan	99	0.11	
Independent	H B Mishra	76	0.09	
LKD	Shokat Ali	41	0.05	−0.24
Majority		14,289	16.04	+2.74
Turnout		89,126	44.65	−12.60
Independent gain from JD		Swing		

=== 1993 ===
Delhi Assembly elections, 1993: Badarpur
Party	Candidate	Votes	%	±%
JD	Ramvir Singh Bidhuri	22,102	41.61	
INC	Ram Singh Netaji	15,036	28.31	
BJP	Lajja Ram	10,697	20.14	
BSP	Chander Pal	2,823	5.31	
CPI(M)	Jagdish	747	1.41	
JP	Ravinder Pratap	474	0.89	
Independent	Shiva A K	206	0.39	
Independent	Shri Lal Prasad	176	0.33	
LKD	Arvind Kumar Rai Urf Arun	152	0.29	
ABMSKP	Balvinder Kaur	131	0.25	
Independent	Singh R N	99	0.19	
Independent	Munshi Lal Gupta	86	0.16	
BJC	Muchinder Prasad	83	0.16	
Doordarshi Party	Ram Pher	82	0.15	
BJVP	Kamal Singh	74	0.14	
SP	Said Raja Hussain	67	0.13	
NDPF	Brij Kishore	44	0.08	
SOP(RP)	Subhash Ch Dubey	40	0.08	
Majority		7,066	13.30	
Turnout		53,119	57.25	
JD win (new seat)				

== See also ==
- Badarpur, Delhi
- First Legislative Assembly of Delhi
- Second Legislative Assembly of Delhi
- Third Legislative Assembly of Delhi
- Fourth Legislative Assembly of Delhi
- Fifth Legislative Assembly of Delhi
- Sixth Legislative Assembly of Delhi
