= Subhash Chopra =

Indian politician

Subhash Chopra (born 23 October 1947) is an Indian politician from Delhi. He served thrice as member of Delhi Legislative Assembly from Kalkaji Assembly constituency, representing the constituency from 1998 to 2013. He has served as the President of Delhi Pradesh Congress Committee.

== Position held ==
Year	Description
1998 - 2003	Elected to 2nd Delhi Assembly from Kalkaji
2003 - 2008	Elected to 3rd Delhi Assembly from Kalkaji (2nd term)
2008 - 2013	Elected to 4th Delhi Assembly from Kalkaji (3rd term)
