= Ashok Kumar Walia =

Indian politician (1948–2021)

Honourable Dr. Ashok Kumar Walia

Cabinet Minister in Government of Delhi
- In office 1998–2003
- Chief Minister: Sheila Dikshit
- Ministry and Departments: Health; Urban Development; Environment, Forests & Wild Life
- In office 2003–2008
- Chief Minister: Sheila Dikshit
- Ministry and Departments: Health; Urban Development; Land & Building
- In office 2008–2013
- Chief Minister: Sheila Dikshit
- Ministry and Departments: Urban Development; Land & Building

Member of the Delhi Legislative Assembly
- In office 2008–2013
- Preceded by: New constituency
- Succeeded by: Vinod Kumar Binny
- Constituency: Laxmi Nagar
- In office 1993–2008
- Constituency: Geeta Colony

Personal details
- Born: 8 December 1948 New Delhi, India
- Died: 22 April 2021 (aged 72) New Delhi, India
- Party: Indian National Congress
- Profession: Doctor, politician

Ashok Kumar Walia (8 December 1948 – 22 April 2021) was an Indian politician and member of the 1st, 2nd, 3rd and 4th Legislative Assembly of Delhi. He was a member of the Indian National Congress and represented Laxmi Nagar constituency of Delhi in his 4th term. In the first three terms, he represented Geeta Colony, which after Delimitation of Parliamentary and Assembly Constituencies Order, 2008 ceased to exist as an assembly constituency.

== Early life and education ==
Walia was born in New Delhi into a Punjabi Hindu family. He received a MBBS degree from MGM Medical College in Indore in 1972 and was a physician by profession.

== Political career ==
Walia was MLA for four consecutive terms. He has served as a State Cabinet Minister in Sheila Dikshit's government for 15 years and held Health, Urban Development, Land & Building portfolios. He was also the Chairman of Trans Yamuna Area Development Board.

== Posts held ==
#	From	To	Position	Comments
01	1993	1998	Member, 01st Legislative Assembly	
02	1998	2003	Member, 02nd Legislative Assembly	
03	2003	2008	Member, 03rd Legislative Assembly	
04	2008	2013	Member, 04th Legislative Assembly	
04	2008	2013	Minister for Health, Urban Development, Land & Building	

== Death ==
Walia died due to COVID-19 in the Delhi Apollo Hospital.

== See also ==
- First Legislative Assembly of Delhi
- Second Legislative Assembly of Delhi
- Third Legislative Assembly of Delhi
- Fourth Legislative Assembly of Delhi
- Delhi Legislative Assembly
- Government of India
- Politics of India
- Indian National Congress
