= Anil Kumar Sharma (Delhi politician) =

Indian politician

Member of the Delhi Legislative Assembly
- Incumbent
- Assumed office 2025
- Preceded by: Pramila Tokas
- Constituency: R. K. Puram

Anil Sharma (born 3 July 1971) is an Indian Politician and a leader of Bharatiya Janata Party. He is currently serving as a member of 8th Delhi Assembly from RK Puram Assembly constituency. Previously, he was elected to Delhi Legislative Assembly from R K Puram constituency in Fifth Delhi Assembly.

== Controversies and Notable Events ==
=== 2026 Satya Niketan Building Collapse ===
In September 2026, during Sharma's tenure as the MLA representing the R. K. Puram constituency, a major tragedy occurred when a five-story, illegally expanded building housing a student PG ("Hostel Daze") collapsed in the Satya Niketan area, resulting in the deaths of seven people and injuries to several others.

The incident triggered a massive political controversy and public protests. The opposition Aam Aadmi Party (AAP) targeted Sharma directly, staging protests outside his residence and alleging that prominent BJP leaders had financial interests or owned unlisted PG accommodations in the area. Viral local claims also surfaced alleging that Sharma owned multiple PGs near the disaster site.

Sharma denied direct ownership of the collapsed building or any illegal PGs in the immediate area, stating that while members of his large extended family live and operate businesses in the locality. He attributed the collapse to structural failures caused by unauthorized ground-floor repair work executed by the builders.
