= Jai Bhagwan Aggarwal =

Indian politician from Delhi (born 1952)

Member of the Delhi Legislative Assembly for Rohini
- In office 1993 – 8 December 2013
- Succeeded by: Rajesh Garg

Personal details
- Born: 4 April 1952 (age 74) Delhi, India
- Party: Bharatiya Janata Party
- Spouse: Krishna Aggarwal
- Children: Three sons
- Parent: Shiv Narain Aggarwal
- Education: Shivaji College, University of Delhi
- Occupation: Businessperson
- Website: Official website

Jai Bhagwan Aggarwal (Hindi pronunciation: [dʒj bʱəɡʋan əɡərʋal]; born 4 April 1952) is an Indian politician from Delhi. He is a member of the Bharatiya Janata Party (BJP), the ruling party in the Indian Parliament and the major party in the Legislative Assembly of Delhi (Delhi Vidhan Sabha). He represented the Rohini constituency in the Delhi Legislative Assembly from 1993 to 2013. He lost to Rajesh Garg of Aam Aadmi Party in the 2013 Delhi legislative assembly election.

== Early life ==
Jai Bhagwan Aggarwal was born on 4 April 1952 in Naharpur village, Sector–7, Rohini Sub City, Delhi, to Shiv Narain Aggarwal. He obtained a Bachelor of Arts degree from the University of Delhi.

== Political career ==
Aggarwal is a member of the Bharatiya Janata Party, the ruling party in the Indian Parliament and the major party in the Delhi Vidhan Sabha.

He contested the Badli Vidhan Sabha Constituency in three consecutive elections from 1993 to 2003. At the 2008 state assembly election, he contested Rohini Constituency, carved out of Badli as a part of delimitation of legislative assembly constituencies in 2008.

He was elected for the First Legislative Assembly of Delhi in 1993, defeating runner-up Rajesh Yadav of Indian National Congress (commonly known as the Congress) by a margin of 9,836 votes. In the 1998 state assembly election, his margin of victory decreased more than half to 4,437 votes over runner-up Narain Singh Yadav of Congress. He improved his margin of victory significantly in 2003 when he defeated Congress candidate Dharam Vir Yadav by 16,564 votes. In the 2008 state assembly election, he garnered 55,793 votes against 30,019 votes of Congress candidate Vijender Jindal, and won with 62.56 percent of the votes.

On 7 November 2013, the Bharatiya Janata Party announced Aggarwal as the party's candidate from Rohini Constituency for the 2013 state legislative assembly election, held on 4 December. He filed his nomination on 13 November 2013. The former Delhi BJP president Vijender Gupta and office secretary S. K. Sharma wanted to contest from Rohini. He lost to the Aam Aadmi Party candidate Rajesh Garg with a margin of 1,872 votes.

== Personal life ==
Jai Bhagwan is married to Krishna Aggarwal, and together they have three sons. In 2006, the Delhi High Court ordered the Municipal Corporation of Delhi to demolish 18,000 properties, which were found to be illegally constructed. Aggarwal, who was living with his family at Saraswati Vihar, Pitampura, had his house demolished as "[t]he court order did not distinguish between the VIP's and the common people of Delhi". He claimed that his action would "change the image of the quintessential tainted Indian politician". He resides at New Swastik Apartment, Sector–9, Rohini. His interests include social and religious work and reading.
