= Shadi Ram =

Indian politician

Shadi Ram is an Indian National Congress politician and a former member of Delhi Legislative Assembly, elected first in 1998 and re-elected in 2003.
