= Government of Delhi =

Territorial government of Delhi

Government of the National Capital Territory of Delhi
- Formation: 2 January 1992; 34 years ago (in its current form)
- Seat: Civil Lines, Delhi, India
- Country: India

Head
- Lieutenant Governor: Taranjit Singh Sandhu

Legislative branch
- Speaker: Vijender Gupta
- Deputy Speaker: Mohan Singh Bisht
- Assembly members: 70
- Meeting place: Vikram Nagar, Delhi, India

Executive branch
- Chief Minister: Rekha Gupta, BJP
- Chief Secretary: Rajeev Verma, IAS

Judicial branch
- Court: Delhi High Court
- Chief Justice: Devendra Kumar Upadhyaya
- Seat: Bapa Nagar, Delhi, India
- Subordinate Courts: Tis Hazari Courts Complex; Patiala House Courts Complex; Karkardooma Courts Complex; Rohini Courts Complex; Dwarka Courts Complex; Saket Courts Complex; Rouse Avenue Courts Complex

The Government of Delhi, officially the Government of the National Capital Territory of Delhi (GNCTD; ISO: Rāṣṭrīya Rājadhānī Kṣētra Dillī Sarakāra), is the governing body of India's National Capital Territory of Delhi, in the National Capital Region in which New Delhi is the seat of the Government of India. It also governs the city or local governments in the area as per the 74th Constitutional Amendment Act.

Union Territories are governed directly by the Government of India. There are a few exceptions, such as Delhi and Puducherry which also have their own elected governments with some limitations.

In May 2023, a landmark Supreme Court verdict ruled that the Government of Delhi has power over all administrative services, including the Indian Administrative Service (IAS), except police, land and public order, and the Lieutenant Governor shall exercise power under the administrative role. However, just days after this judgment, the Central Government circumvented the ruling by issuing an ordinance to establish the National Capital Civil Services Authority in Delhi. This ordinance effectively reasserts the Central Government's dominance by designating the Chief Minister of Delhi as the head of the authority, with the Chief Secretary and Home Secretary—both reporting to the Central Government—as members. The authority’s primary function is to control the transfer and posting of Group 'A' officers and DANICS officers in the Delhi government, undermining the Supreme Court's recognition of Delhi's autonomy over its administrative services.

== Local governments ==
The local or city government is headed by the mayor. The Municipal Corporation of Delhi handles civic administration for the city, and has one mayor.

Heretofore the Municipal Corporation of Delhi was trifurcated into three bodies: the North Delhi Municipal Corporation, the South Delhi Municipal Corporation, and the East Delhi Municipal Corporation in 2012. They were reunified on 22 May 2022.

The Delhi Cantonment Board operates as an independent municipal authority within the city of Delhi. As stipulated by the Cantonment Board Act of 2006, cantonment boards are designated as municipalities and are governed directly by the Ministry of Defence. This grants the Delhi Cantonment Board jurisdiction over its area, separate from the governance and administrative framework of the Delhi government.

== Government of NCT of Delhi ==
The Chief Minister and lieutenant Governor are the heads of the Government. The government consists of the legislative wing, namely the Legislative Assembly of Delhi, which is unicameral, consisting of 70 members of the legislative assembly.

=== History ===
The Legislative Assembly of Delhi was first constituted on 17 March 1952 under the Government of Part C States Act, 1951, but it was abolished on 1 October 1956. The legislative assembly of Delhi was re-established on January 2, 1992, following the enforcement of the Constitution (Sixty-ninth Amendment) Act, 1991, and the subsequent Government of National Capital Territory of Delhi Act, 1991. The Sixty-ninth Amendment formally renamed the Union Territory of Delhi as the National Capital Territory of Delhi, granting it a unique status with its own legislative assembly.

The maiden chief minister of Delhi was Chaudhary Brahm Prakash Yadav of the Indian National Congress, whereas the first woman chief minister was Sushma Swaraj (BJP). Sheila Dikshit (INC) has been the chief minister for the maximum number of terms (three) and served for the longest duration (15 years). Guru Radha Kishan (CPI) had the rare distinction of representing his constituency in the Municipal Corporation of Delhi for most years continuously by an individual and Chaudhary Prem Singh (INC) has won the maximum elections for different civic bodies in Delhi.

== Central Government ==
The Lieutenant Governor of Delhi is appointed by the President of India, as the agent of President and head of state like governor, on the advice of the Central government. This state government is called the Government of the National Capital Territory of Delhi (Government of NCT of Delhi or simply Government of Delhi). It consists of an executive, led by the Lieutenant Governor of Delhi, a judiciary and a legislature.

=== Centre versus State ===
The Supreme Court of India in Government of NCT of Delhi v. Union of India ruled that according to the Article 239AA of the Indian constitution, that although the government had to keep him/her informed of its decisions, Delhi's lieutenant governor did not have any independent decision-making powers and had to follow the "aid and advice" of the chief minister-led council of ministers of the Government of Delhi on matters which the Delhi Legislative Assembly could legislate on, viz., all items on the State List (items on which only state legislatures can legislate) and the Concurrent List (items on which both the Parliament of India and the state legislatures can legislate) barring 'police, 'public order' and 'land'. The court added that on matters referred to him/her, the LG was bound to follow the orders of the president.

== Judiciary ==
The Delhi High Court has jurisdiction over Delhi, which also has two types of lower courts: the Small Causes Court for civil cases, and the Sessions Court for criminal cases. Like other Union territories, the Delhi Police reports to the Ministry of Home Affairs, Government of India and not the government of NCT of Delhi. Headed by the Police Commissioner, it is one of the largest metropolitan police forces in the world. The headquarters of Delhi Police are located Jai Singh Marg, Connaught Place, New Delhi.

== Universities ==
The following universities were established by the Govt. of Delhi.

1. Delhi Technological University
2. Indraprastha Institute of Information Technology

== Agencies ==
=== Commissions ===
1. Delhi Electricity Regulatory Commission

=== State Public Sector Undertakings ===
1. Intelligent Communications Systems India Ltd., a JV between TCIL and DSIIDC
2. Delhi Transport Corporation
3. Delhi State Industrial and Infrastructure Development Corporation Ltd.
4. Delhi Transco Limited
5. Delhi Financial Corporation
6. Delhi Tourism and Transportation Development Corporation
7. National Capital Region Transport Corporation, a Joint Venture of Govt. of India and participating State Governments
8. Indraprastha Power Generation Company Limited
9. Delhi Integrated Multi Modal Transit System Limited

=== Hospitals ===
1. Delhi State Cancer Institutes

=== Others ===
1. Delhi State Health Mission
2. Delhi RERA

== See also ==
- First Legislative Assembly of Delhi
- Second Legislative Assembly of Delhi
- Third Legislative Assembly of Delhi
- Fourth Legislative Assembly of Delhi
- Fifth Legislative Assembly of Delhi
- Sixth Legislative Assembly of Delhi
- Seventh Legislative Assembly of Delhi
- Eighth Legislative Assembly of Delhi
