= 4th Delhi Assembly =

Fourth Legislative Assembly of Delhi

Legislative Assembly of Delhi (Vidhan Sabha of Delhi)

Type
- Type: Unicameral
- Term limits: 5 year

History
- Founded: October 2008
- Disbanded: November 2013
- Preceded by: 3rd Delhi Assembly
- Succeeded by: 5th Delhi Assembly

Leadership
- Chief Minister: Sheila Dikshit, INC

Structure
- Seats: 70
- Political groups: Government (43) INC (43) Official Opposition (23) BJP (23) Other Opposition (4) BSP (2) LJP (1) Independent (1)

Elections
- Voting system: FPTP
- Last election: October 2008

Meeting place
- Old Secretariat, Delhi, India

Website
- www.delhiassembly.nic.in

The Fourth Legislative Assembly of Delhi was constituted in October 2008 after the 2008 Delhi Legislative Assembly elections.

== Election and government formation ==
In all, 7 national parties, 8 state parties, 53 registered (unrecognised) parties and other independent candidates contested for the 70 assembly seats of the Assembly.

With 43 seats, INC emerged as the single largest party, much ahead of the half-way mark (35 seats) required to form the government. Congress's tally was followed by BJP with 23 seats. Being the single largest party, INC approached the Lieutenant Governor of Delhi Tejendra Khanna and made claim to form a government. INC hence formed the government with Sheila Dikshit as the Chief Minister.

== Electors ==
	Male	Female	Others	Total
Electors	5,966,895	4,759,678	-	10,726,573
Electors who voted	3,481,118	2,694,957	-	6,176,075
Polling percentage	58.34%	56.62%	-	57.58%

== Candidates ==
	Male	Female	Others	Total
Candidates	794	81	-	875
Elected	67	3	-	70
Forfeited deposits	641	70	-	711

== Important members ==
#	From	To	Position	Name	Party
01	2008	2013	Chief Minister (Leader of the House)	Sheila Dikshit	INC
02	2008	2013	Speaker	-	-
03	2008	2013	Deputy Speaker	Amrish Singh Gautam	Indian National Congress
04	2008	2013	Leader of the Opposition	Vijay Kumar Malhotra	Bharatiya Janata Party

== List of members ==
Default sort, in ascending order of constituency.

#	Assembly constituency	Name	Party	Comment
01	Adarsh Nagar	Mangat Ram Singhal	INC	
02	Ambedkar Nagar	Chaudhary Prem Singh	INC	
03	Babarpur	Naresh Gaur	BJP	
04	Badarpur	Ram Singh Netaji	BSP	
05	Badli	Devender Yadav	INC	
06	Ballimaran	Haroon Yusuf	INC	
07	Bawana	Surender Kumar	INC	
08	Bijwasan	Sat Prakash Rana	BJP	
09	Burari	Krishan Tyagi	BJP	
10	Chandni Chowk	Parlad Singh Sawhney	INC	
11	Chhatarpur	Balram Tanwar	INC	
12	Delhi Cantt	Karan Singh Tanwar	BJP	
13	Deoli	Arvinder Singh Lovely	INC	
14	Dwarka	Mahabal Mishra	INC	
15	Gandhi Nagar	Arvinder Singh Lovely	INC	
16	Ghonda	Sahab Singh Chauhan	BJP	
17	Gokalpur	Surendra Kumar	BSP	
18	Greater Kailash	Vijay Kumar Malhotra	BJP	
19	Hari Nagar	Harsharan Singh Balli	BJP	
20	Janakpuri	Jagdish Mukhi	BJP	
21	Jangpura	Tarvinder Singh Marwah	INC	
22	Kalkaji	Subhash Chopra	INC	
23	Karawal Nagar	Mohan Singh Bisht	BJP	
24	Karol Bagh	Surender Pal Ratawal	BJP	
25	Kasturba Nagar	Neeraj Basoya	INC	
26	Kirari	Anil Jha Vats	BJP	
27	Kondli	Amrish Singh Gautam	INC	
28	Krishna Nagar	Harsh Vardhan	BJP	
29	Laxmi Nagar	Dr. Ashok Kumar Walia	INC	
30	Madipur	Mala Ram Gangwal	INC	
31	Malviya Nagar	Kiran Walia	INC	
32	Mangol Puri	Raj Kumar Chauhan	INC	
33	Matia Mahal	Shoaib Iqbal	LJP	
34	Matiala	Sumesh Shokeen	INC	
35	Mehrauli	Yoganand Shastri	INC	
36	Model Town	Kanwar Karan Singh	INC	
37	Moti Nagar	Subhash Sachdeva	BJP	
38	Mundka	Manoj Kumar Shokeen	BJP	
39	Mustafabad	Hasan Ahmed	INC	
40	Najafgarh	Bharat Singh	IND	
41	Nangloi Jat	Bijender Singh	INC	
42	Nerela	Jaswant Singh	INC	
43	New Delhi	Sheila Dikshit	INC	
44	Okhla	Parvez Hashmi	INC	
45	Palam	Dharam Dev Solanki	BJP	
46	Patel Nagar	Rajesh Lilothia	INC	
47	Patparganj	Anil Chaudhary	INC	
48	R.K. Puram	Barkha Singh	INC	
49	Rajinder Nagar	Ramakant Goswami	INC	
50	Rajouri Garden	Dyanand Chandila	INC	
51	Rithala	Kulwant Rana	BJP	
52	Rohini	Jai Bhagwan Aggarwal	BJP	
53	Rohtas Nagar	Ram Babu Sharma	INC	
54	Sadar Bazar	Rajesh Jain	INC	
55	Sangam Vihar	Dr. S.C.L.Gupta	BJP	
56	Seelampur	Chaudhary Mateen Ahmed	INC	
57	Seemapuri	Veer Singh Dhingan	INC	
58	Shahdara	Narender Nath	INC	
59	Shakur Basti	Shyam Lal Garg	BJP	
60	Shalimar Bagh	Ravinder Nath Bansal	BJP	
61	Sultan Pur Majra	Jai Kishan	INC	
62	Tilak Nagar	O.P. Babbar	BJP	
63	Timarpur	Surinder Pal Singh	INC	
64	Tri Nagar	Anil Bhardwaj	INC	
65	Trilokpuri	Sunil Kumar	BJP	
66	Tughlakabad	Ramesh Bidhuri	BJP	
67	Uttam Nagar	Mukesh Sharma	INC	
68	Vikaspuri	Nand Kishore	INC	
69	Vishwas Nagar	Naseeb Singh	INC	
70	Wazirpur	Hari Shanker Gupta	INC	
