= Rajesh Garg =

Indian politician

Rajesh Garg, sometimes known as Rajesh Garg Rohiniwala, is an Indian politician. He was elected a Member of the Legislative Assembly from the Rohini constituency in the 2013 Delhi Legislative Assembly elections. He is also a Right to Information activist.

== Political career ==
While a student at the University of Delhi, Garg was a member of Akhil Bharatiya Vidyarthi Parishad (ABVP), the student and youth wing of Bharatiya Jan Sangh. He left ABVP to join a student leader who had left the National Students' Union of India, the student and youth wing of the Indian National Congress in the same year, to form a Chhatra Morcha, in order to contest Delhi University Students' Union elections. Garg was elected president.

Garg's wife contested an election on the Congress ticket. In spite of being a Congress member, he took part in the Jan Lokpal Andolan. Aam Aadmi Party suspended Garg when he released an audio tape featuring Arvind Kejriwal. He alleged that Kejriwal's men used to call him and other MLAs, pretending to be leaders from Bharatiya Janata Party and asking for support.
