= Ram Singh Netaji =

Indian politician

Member of the Delhi Legislative Assembly
- Incumbent
- Assumed office 8 February 2025
- Preceded by: Ramvir Singh Bidhuri
- Constituency: Badarpur
- In office Oct 2008 – Nov 2013
- Preceded by: Ramvir Singh Bidhuri
- Succeeded by: Ramvir Singh Bidhuri
- In office Nov 1998 – Nov 2003
- Preceded by: Ramvir Singh Bidhuri
- Succeeded by: Ramvir Singh Bidhuri
- Constituency: Badarpur

Personal details
- Born: 1 January 1956 (age 70) Delhi
- Citizenship: India
- Party: Aam Aadmi Party
- Other party: INC, BSP
- Spouse: Mrs. Bhagyawati Devi
- Children: 3 sons & 1 daughter
- Parent: Choudhary Kundan Singh (father)
- Profession: Agriculturist & Politician

Ram Singh Netaji (born 1956) is an Indian politician and was member of the 2nd and the Fourth Legislative Assemblies of Delhi. Currently, he is a member of the Aam Aadmi Party.

== Early life and education ==
Ram Singh Netaji was born in Badarpur village of New Delhi. He is educated till 7th grade and is an agriculturist by profession. He is from the Gurjar community.

== Political career ==
Ram Singh Netaji won from Badarpur Assembly constituency representing the Aam Aadmi Party in the 2025 Delhi Legislative Assembly election. He polled 112,991 votes and defeated his nearest rival ND Sharma of the Bhartiya Janta Party, by 25,888 votes.

Previously Ram Singh Netaji was MLA for two terms from Badarpur (Assembly constituency). During the Second Legislative Assembly of Delhi in 1998 he contested as an Independent candidate whereas during the Fourth Legislative Assembly of Delhi he contested on the Bahujan Samaj Party ticket. He is currently a member of the Aam Aadmi Party. He joined Aam Aadmi Party in presence of National Convener and current Chief Minister of Delhi Arvind Kejriwal and other senior party leaders Manish Sisodia and Sanjay Singh on 13 January 2020.

== Posts held ==
| # | From | To | Position | Comments |
|---|---|---|---|---|
| 01 | 1998 | 2003 | Member, Second Legislative Assembly of Delhi | |
| 02 | 2008 | 2013 | Member, Fourth Legislative Assembly of Delhi | |
| 03 | 2025 | 2030 | Member, 8th Delhi Assembly | |

== See also ==
- Second Legislative Assembly of Delhi
- Fourth Legislative Assembly of Delhi
- Delhi Legislative Assembly
- Government of India
- Politics of India
- Bahujan Samaj Party
- Indian National Congress
- Aam Aadmi Party
