= Ramvir Singh Bidhuri =

Indian politician

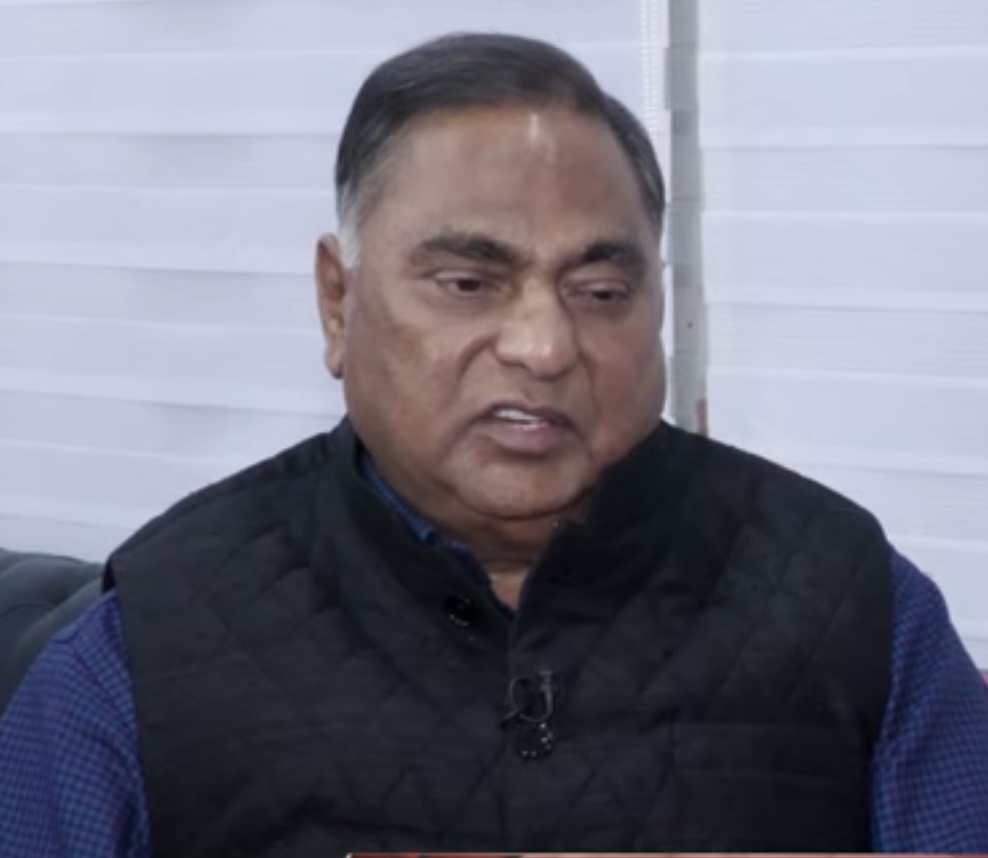

Member of Parliament, Lok Sabha
- Incumbent
- Assumed office 4 June 2024
- Preceded by: Ramesh Bidhuri
- Constituency: South Delhi

Leader of Opposition Delhi Legislative Assembly
- In office 24 February 2020 – 4 June 2024
- Preceded by: Vijender Gupta
- Succeeded by: Vijender Gupta

Member of the Delhi Legislative Assembly
- In office Feb 2020 – June 2024
- Preceded by: Narayan Dutt Sharma
- Succeeded by: Ram Singh Netaji
- In office Dec 2013 – Nov 2014
- Preceded by: Ram Singh Netaji
- Succeeded by: Narayan Dutt Sharma
- In office Dec 2003 – Dec 2008
- Preceded by: Ram Singh Netaji
- Succeeded by: Ram Singh Netaji
- Constituency: Badarpur
- In office Dec 1993 – Dec 1998
- Succeeded by: Ram Singh Netaji

Personal details
- Born: 4 December 1952 (age 73) Delhi, India
- Party: Bharatiya Janata Party (2013–present); Nationalist Congress Party (Till 2013); Janata Dal
- Education: Graduate
- Alma mater: Delhi University (1973)
- Profession: Business, Politician

Ramvir Singh Bidhuri (born 4 December 1952) is the current Member of Parliament for South Delhi Lok Sabha 2024, having won on a BJP ticket in the Lok Sabha elections 2024. He was a four-time MLA from Delhi's Badarpur seat. He served as the Leader of Opposition in the Delhi Vidhan Sabha from 2020 to 2024, having been elected from the Badarpur Vidhan Sabha constituency in Delhi from 1993 to 1998, 2003 to 2008, 2013 to 2015, and 2020 to 2024. In 2024, he was nominated the BJP's candidate for the South Delhi constituency in Delhi, succeeding two-time MP Ramesh Bidhuri.

== Assets and liabilities ==
Ramvir Singh Bidhuri owns assets of total value Rs 52,64,19,941 ~52 Crore+ as per his Election Commission affidavit.

== Early life and education ==
Ramvir Singh Bidhuri was born in New Delhi. He is a graduate of Delhi University. He grew up in Tughlaqabad village of New Delhi. He belonged to the Gurjar Bidhuri family of agricultural background.

== Political career ==
Ramvir Singh Bidhuri started his political career in 1970 by joining Akhil Bharatiya Vidyarthi Parishad as a student activist of Delhi University.

From 1981 till 1985 he was Chairman of Haryana Warehousing Corporation with the rank of a Cabinet Minister. During his tenure, his corporation doubled its storage capacity and its profits increased by 13 times. This phenomenal achievement is without parallel in any Public Sector Undertaking/Corporation.

When Delhi got its first Legislative Assembly in 1993, Bidhuri won from Badarpur assembly constituency.

Bidhuri was again elected as MLA from Badarpur Assembly Constituency from 2003 to 2008. On account of his outstanding performance as a Legislator, he was conferred with award of ‘Best MLA’ in 2008 by Somnath Chatterjee the then Hon’ble Speaker of Lok Sabha.

In 2013 he was made Member of National Executive of Bharatiya Janata Party.

Bidhuri was once again elected as MLA as BJP candidate from Badarpur Assembly constituency in 2013. He was ranked 1st in utilizing his MLA Local Area Development Fund for carrying out development works in his constituency during 2013 and 2014.

He was again elected as MLA as from BJP from Badarpur Assembly Constituency in the Assembly Election held in February 2020 by defeating Aam Aadmi Party candidate Ram Singh Netaji.

Subsequently, he was made the Leader of Opposition of the Delhi Assembly.

== Posts held ==
#	From	To	Position
01	1981	1985	Chairman of Haryana Warehousing Corporation
02	1993	1998	Member, First Legislative Assembly of Delhi
03	2003	2008	Member, Third Legislative Assembly of Delhi
05	2013	2014	Member, Fifth Legislative Assembly of Delhi
06	2020	2024	Member, Seventh Legislative Assembly of Delhi
07	2020	2024	Leader of Opposition in Delhi Legislative Assembly
08	2024	Present	MP, South Delhi

== See also ==
- First Legislative Assembly of Delhi
- Third Legislative Assembly of Delhi
- Fifth Legislative Assembly of Delhi
- Delhi Legislative Assembly
- Government of India
- Politics of India
- Bharatiya Janata Party
