= 3rd Delhi Assembly =

Third Legislative Assembly of Delhi

Legislative Assembly of Delhi (Vidhan Sabha of Delhi)

Type
- Type: Unicameral
- Term limits: 5 year

History
- Founded: 2003
- Disbanded: 2008
- Preceded by: 2nd Delhi Assembly
- Succeeded by: 4th Delhi Assembly

Leadership
- Chief Minister: Sheila Dikshit, INC
- Leader of the Opposition: Vijay Kumar Malhotra, BJP

Structure
- Seats: 70
- Political groups: INC (47); BJP (20); JD (U) (1); NCP (1); IND (1)

Elections
- Voting system: FPTP
- Last election: 2003

Meeting place
- Old Secretariat, Delhi, India

Website
- www.delhiassembly.nic.in

The Third Legislative Assembly of Delhi was constituted in 2003 after Delhi Legislative Assembly election held on 1 December 2003.

== Election and Government formation ==
In all, six national parties, twelve state parties, forty-five registered (unrecognized) parties and other independent candidates contested for 70 assembly seats. With 47 seats, INC emerged as the single largest party and formed the Government with Sheila Dikshit as the Chief Minister. BJP won 20 seats and secured the second position. JD(S), NCP and Independent contestant each won one seat.

== Electors ==
	Male	Female	Total
Electors	47,56,330	36,91,994	84,48,324
Electors who voted	26,10,829	19,02,306	45,13,135
Polling percentage	54.89%	51.43%	53.42%

== Candidates ==
	Male	Female	Others	Total
Candidates	739	78	0	817
Elected	63	7	0	70
Forfeited deposits	612	60	0	672

== Elected members ==
#	From	To	Position	Name	Party
01	2003	2008	Chief Minister (Leader of the House)	Shiela Dixit	INC
02	2003	2008	Speaker	Ajay Maken	INC
03	2003	2008	Deputy Speaker	Krishna Tirath	INC
04	2003	2008	Leader of the Opposition	Vijay Kumar Malhotra	BJP

== List of members ==
Default sort, in ascending order of constituency

#	Assembly constituency	Name	Party
01	Adarsh Nagar	Mangat Ram Singhal	INC
02	Ambedkar Nagar (SC)	Prem Singh	INC
03	Babarpur	Vinay Sharma	INC
04	Badarpur	Ramvir Singh Bidhuri	NCP
05	Badli	Jai Bhagwan Aggarwal	BJP
06	Baljit Nagar (SC)	Krishna Tirath	INC
07	Ballimaran	Haroon Yusuf	INC
08	Bawana (SC)	Surender Kumar	INC
09	Bhalswa Jahangirpur	J S Chauhan	INC
10	Chandni Chowk	Parlad Singh Sawhney	INC
11	Delhi Cantt	Karan Singh Tanwar	BJP
12	Gandhi Nagar	Arvinder Singh Lovely	INC
13	Geeta Colony	Ashok Kumar Walia	INC
14	Ghonda	Bheeshm Sharma	INC
15	Gole Market	Sheila Dikshit	INC
16	Hari Nagar	Harsharan Singh Balli	BJP
17	Hastsal	Mukesh Sharma	INC
18	Hauz Khas	Kiran Walia	BJP
19	Janakpuri	Jagdish Mukhi	BJP
20	Jangpura	Tarvinder Singh Marwah	INC
21	Kalkaji	Subhash Chopra	INC
22	Kamla Nagar	Shadi Ram	INC
23	Karol Bagh (SC)	Surender Pal Ratawal	BJP
24	Kasturba Nagar	Shushil Choudhary	BJP
25	Krishna Nagar	Harsh Vardhan	BJP
26	Madipur (SC)	Mala Ram Gangwal	INC
27	Mahipalpur	Vijay Singh Lochav	INC
28	Malviya Nagar	Yoganand Shastri	INC
29	Mandawali	Meera Bhardwaj	INC
30	Mangol Puri (SC)	Raj Kumar Chauhan	INC
31	Matia Mahal	Shoaib Iqbal	JD(S)
32	Minto Road	Tajdar Babar	INC
33	Mehrauli	Balram Tanwar	INC
34	Model Town	Kanwar Karan Singh	INC
35	Moti Nagar	Madan Lal Khurana	BJP
36	Najafgarh	Ranbir Singh Kharb	Independent
37	Nand Nagari (SC)	Baljor Singh	INC
38	Nangloi Jat	Bijender Singh	INC
39	Nerela (SC)	Charan Singh Kandera	INC
40	Nasirpur	Mahabal Mishra	INC
41	Okhla	Parvez Hashmi	INC
42	Pahar Ganj	Anjali Rai	INC
43	Palam	Dharam Dev Solanki	BJP
44	Patel Nagar	Rama Kant Goswami	INC
45	Patparganj (SC)	Amrish Singh Gautam	INC
46	Qarawal Nagar	Mohan Singh Bist	BJP
47	Ram Nagar (SC)	Moti Lal Sodi	INC
48	R. K. Puram	Barkha Singh	INC
49	Rajinder Nagar	Puran Chand Yogi	BJP
50	Rajouri Garden	Ajay Maken	INC
51	Rohtas Nagar	Ram Babu Sharma	INC
52	Sadar Bazar	Rajesh Jain	INC
53	Sahibabad Daulatpur	Kulwant Rana	BJP
54	Saket	Vijay Jolly	BJP
55	Sarojini Nagar	Ashok Ahuja	INC
56	Seelampur	Mateen Ahmad	INC
57	Seema Puri (SC)	Veer Singh Dhingan	INC
58	Shahdara	Narender Nath	INC
59	Shakur Basti	S. C. Vats	INC
60	Shalimar Bagh	Ravinder Nath Bansal	BJP
61	Sultanpur (SC)	Jai Kishan	INC
62	Tilak Nagar	O. P. Babbar	BJP
63	Timarpur	Surinder Pal Singh	INC
64	Tri Nagar	Anil Bhardwaj	INC
65	Trilokpuri (SC)	Bhrampal	INC
66	Tughlakabad	Ramesh Bidhuri	BJP
67	Vishnu Garden	A. Dayanand Chandila	BJP
68	Vishwas Nagar	Naseeb Singh	INC
69	Wazirpur	Mange Ram Garg	BJP
70	Yamuna Vihar	Shahab Singh Chauhan	BJP
