= Dharam Dev Solanki =

Indian politician

Dharam Dev Solanki (born 20 March 1950) is a leader of Bharatiya Janata Party and a former member of the Delhi Legislative Assembly. He was elected to the assembly in 1993, 2003, 2008 and 2013 from Palam.

== Early life and education ==
He is native from Palam, New Delhi. He was born in 1950 into a Hindu Rajput family.
