= 2nd Delhi Assembly =

Second Legislative Assembly of Delhi

Legislative Assembly of Delhi (Vidhan Sabha of Delhi)

Type
- Type: Unicameral
- Term limits: 5 year

History
- Founded: 1998
- Disbanded: 2003
- Preceded by: 1st Delhi Assembly
- Succeeded by: 3rd Delhi Assembly

Leadership
- Chief Minister: Sheila Dikshit, Indian National Congress
- Leader of the Opposition: Madan Lal Khurana, BJP

Structure
- Seats: 70
- Political groups: Government (52) INC (52) Official Opposition (17) BJP (15) Other Opposition (3) Independents (2) JD (1)

Elections
- Voting system: FPTP
- Last election: 1998

Meeting place
- Old Secretariat, Delhi, India

Website
- www.delhiassembly.nic.in

The Second Legislative Assembly of Delhi was constituted in 1998 after Delhi Legislative Assembly election on 25 November 1998.

== Election and government formation ==
Total seven national parties, eighteen state parties, fifty-five registered (unrecognized) parties and other independent candidates contested for 70 assembly seats. With 52 seats, INC emerged as the single largest party and formed with Sheila Dikshit as the Chief Minister. With 17 seats BJP was at second position and JDU with one, at third.

== Electors ==
	Male	Female	Total
Electors	48,51,199	35,68,942	84,20,141
Electors who voted	24,68,791	16,56,195	41,24,986
Polling percentage	50.89%	46.41%	48.99%

== Candidates ==
	Male	Female	Others	Total
Candidates	758	57	0	815
Elected	61	9	0	70
Forfeited deposits	627	42	0	669

== List of members ==
Default sort, in ascending order of constituency

#	Assembly constituency	Name	Party
01	Adarsh Nagar	Mangat Ram Singhal	INC
02	Ambedkar Nagar	Prem Singh	INC
03	Babarpur	Naresh Gaur	BJP
04	Badarpur	Ram Singh Netaji	IND
05	Badli	Jai Bhagwan Aggarwal	BJP
06	Baljit Nagar	Krishna	INC
07	Ballimaran	Haroon Yusuf	INC
08	Bawana	Surender Kumar	INC
09	Bhalswa Jahangirpur	J. S. Chauhan	INC
10	Chandni Chowk	Parlad Singh Sawhney	INC
11	Delhi Cantt	Kiran Chaudhri	INC
12	Gandhi Nagar	Arvinder Singh Lovely	INC
13	Geeta Colony	Ashok Kumar Walia	INC
14	Ghonda	Bheeshm Sharma	INC
15	Gole Market	Sheila Dikshit	INC
16	Hari Nagar	Harsharan Singh Balli	BJP
17	Hastsal	Mukesh Sharma	INC
18	Hauz Khas	Sushma Swaraj	BJP
19	Janakpuri	Prof. Jagdish Mukhi	BJP
20	Jangpura	Tarvinder Singh Marwah	INC
21	Kalkaji	Subhash Chopra	INC
22	Kamla Nagar	Shadi Ram	INC
23	Karol Bagh	Motilal Bokolia	INC
24	Kasturba Nagar	Shushil Choudhary	BJP
25	Krishna Nagar	Dr. Harsh Vardhan	BJP
26	Madipur	Mala Ram Gangwal	INC
27	Mahipalpur	Mahender Singh	INC
28	Malviya Nagar	Dr. Yoganand Shastri	INC
29	Mandawali	Meera Bhardwaj	INC
30	Mangol Puri	Raj Kumar Chauhan	INC
31	Matia Mahal	Shoaib Iqbal	JD (U)
32	Minto Road	Tajdar Babar	INC
33	Mehrauli	Bhram Singh Tanvar	BJP
34	Model Town	Kanwar Karan Singh	INC
35	Moti Nagar	Avinash Shahni	BJP
36	Najafgarh	Kanwal Singh	INC
37	Nand Nagari	Roop Chand	INC
38	Nangloi Jat	Prem Chand	INC
39	Nerela	Charan Singh Kandera	INC
40	Nasirpur	Mahabal Mishra	INC
41	Okhla	Parvez Hashmi	INC
42	Pahar Ganj	Anjali Rai	INC
43	Palam	Mahendar Yadav	INC
44	Patel Nagar	Rama Kant Goswami	INC
45	Patparganj	Amrish Singh Gautam	INC
46	Qarawal Nagar	Mohan Singh Bist	BJP
47	Ram Nagar	Darshna	INC
48	R. K. Puram	Ashok Singh	INC
49	Rajinder Nagar	Puran Chand Yogi	BJP
50	Rajouri Garden	Ajay Maken	INC
51	Rohtas Nagar	Radhey Shyam Khanna	INC
52	Sadar Bazar	Rajesh Jain	INC
53	Sahibabad Daulatpur	Ramesh Kumar	INC
54	Saket	Tek Chand Sharma	INC
55	Sarojini Nagar	Ram Bhaj	BJP
56	Seelampur	Mateen Ahmed	INC
57	Seema Puri	Veer Singh Dhingan	INC
58	Shahdara	Narender Nath	INC
59	Shakur Basti	S. C. Vats	INC
60	Shalimar Bagh	Ravinder Nath	BJP
61	Sultanpur	Sushila Devi	INC
62	Tilak Nagar	Jaspal Singh	INC
63	Timarpur	Jagdish Anand	INC
64	Tri Nagar	Nand Kishore Garg	BJP
65	Trilokpuri	Bhrampal	INC
66	Tughlakabad	Shish Pal Singh	INC
67	Vishnu Garden	Mahinder Singh Saathi	INC
68	Vishwas Nagar	Naseeb Singh	INC
69	Wazirpur	Deep Chand Bandhu	INC
70	Yamuna Vihar	Shahab Singh Chauhan	BJP
