= Delhi Legislative Assembly =

Unicameral legislature of the National Capital Territory of Delhi

- 8th Delhi Assembly

Type
- Type: Unicameral
- Term limits: 5 years

History
- Founded: 14 December 1993 (32 years ago)
- Preceded by: 7th Delhi Assembly

Leadership
- Lieutenant Governor: Taranjit Singh Sandhu since 11 March 2026
- Speaker: Vijender Gupta, BJP since 20 February 2025
- Deputy Speaker: Mohan Singh Bisht, BJP since 26 February 2025
- Chief Minister (Leader of the House): Rekha Gupta, BJP since 20 February 2025
- Leader of the Opposition: Atishi Marlena, AAP since 22 February 2025
- Deputy Leader of the Opposition: Anil Jha Vats, AAP since 23 February 2025
- Chief Whip: Abhay Verma, BJP since 23 February 2025

Structure
- Seats: 70
- Political groups: Government (48): BJP (48); Opposition (22): AAP (22)

Elections
- Voting system: First-past-the-post voting
- Last election: 5 February 2025
- Next election: February 2030

Meeting place
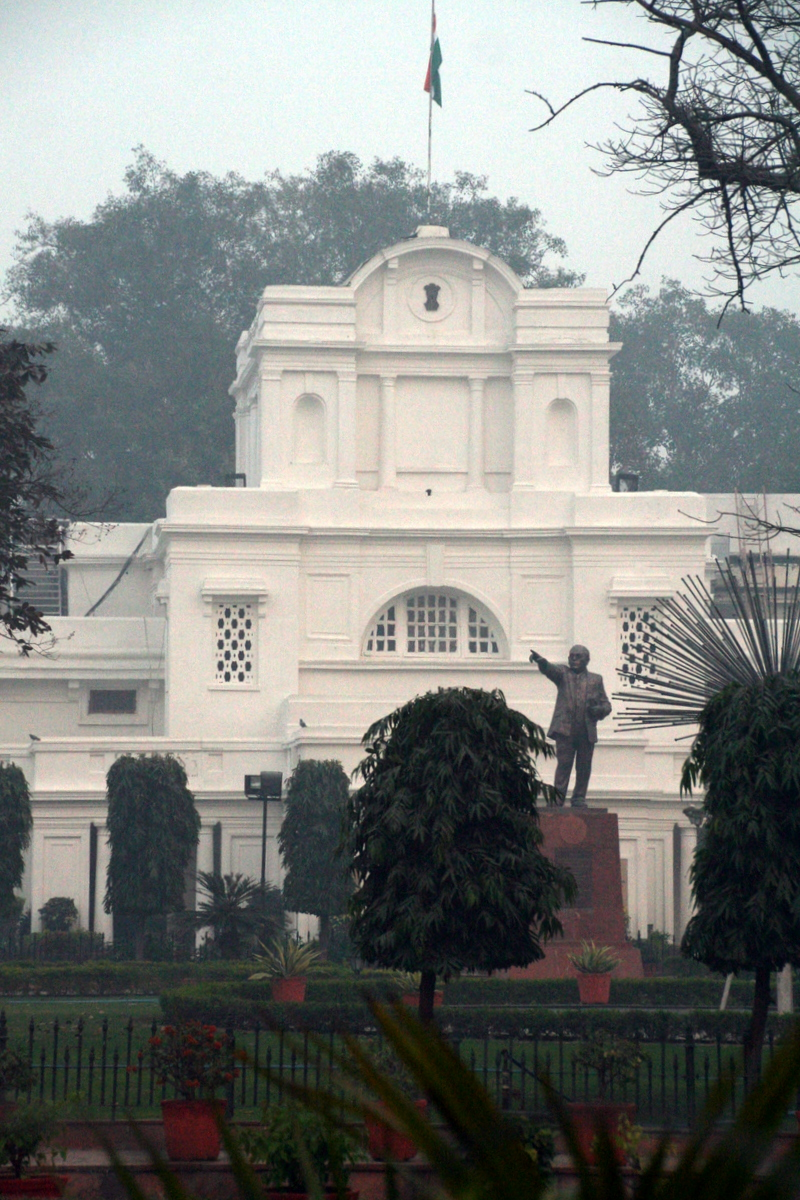
- Old Secretariat, Vikram Nagar, Civil Lines, Delhi

Website
- Legislative Assembly of Delhi

The Legislative Assembly of the National Capital Territory of Delhi is the unicameral legislature of the union territory of Delhi in the National Capital Region, India. Delhi Legislative Assembly is the legislative arm of the Government of Delhi. At present, it consists of 70 members, directly elected from 70 constituencies. The tenure of the Legislative Assembly is five years unless dissolved sooner.

The seat of assembly is the Old Secretariat building, which is also the seat of the Government of Delhi.

== History ==
The Delhi Legislative Assembly was first constituted on 7 March 1952 under the Government of Part C States Act, 1951; it was inaugurated by Home Minister K. N. Katju. The Assembly had 48 members, and a Council of Ministers in an advisory role to the Chief Commissioner of Delhi, though it also had powers to make laws. The first Council of Ministers was led by Brahm Prakash, who became the first Chief Minister of Delhi.

However, the States Reorganisation Commission, set up in 1953, led to the Constitutional amendment through States Reorganisation Act, 1956, which came into effect on 1 November 1956. This meant that Delhi was no longer a Part-C State and was made a Union Territory under the direct administration of the President of India. Also the Delhi Legislative Assembly and the Council of Ministers were abolished simultaneously. Subsequently, the Delhi Municipal Corporation Act, 1957 was enacted which led to the formation the Municipal Corporation.

In September 1966, with "The Delhi Administration Act, 1966", the assembly was replaced by the Delhi Metropolitan Council with 56 elected and five nominated members with the Lt. Governor of Delhi as its head. The Council however had no legislative powers, only an advisory role in the governance of Delhi. This set up functioned until 1990.

This Council was finally replaced by the Delhi Legislative Assembly through the Constitution (Sixty-ninth Amendment) Act, 1991, followed by the Government of National Capital Territory of Delhi Act, 1991 the Sixty-ninth Amendment to the Constitution of India, which declared the Union Territory of Delhi to be formally known as National Capital Territory of Delhi and also supplements the constitutional provisions relating to the Legislative Assembly and the Council of Ministers and related matters. The Legislative Assembly is selected for period of five years, and presently it is the eighth assembly, which was selected through the 2025 Delhi Legislative Assembly Election.

=== Assembly building ===
The building was originally built in 1912, designed by E. Montague Thomas to hold the Imperial Legislative Council and subsequently the Central Legislative Assembly (after 1919), until the newly constructed Parliament House of India in New Delhi (Sansad Bhawan) was inaugurated on 18 January 1927. The site was built over the land of the former Old Chandrawal village.

The building also housed the Secretariat of the Government of India, and was built after the capital of India shifted to Delhi from Calcutta. The temporary secretariat building was constructed in a few months' time in 1912. It functioned as the Secretariat for another decade, before the offices shifted to the present Secretariat Building on Raisina Hill.

== List of assemblies ==
Assembly	Election year	Speaker	Chief Minister	Party	Opposition Leader	Party
Interim Assembly	1952	N/A	Brahm Prakash	Indian National Congress	N/A	Bharatiya Jana Sangh
Interim Assembly	1952	N/A	Gurmukh Nihal Singh	Indian National Congress	N/A	Bharatiya Jana Sangh
State Reorganization
1st Assembly	1993	Charti Lal Goel	Madan Lal Khurana	Bharatiya Janata Party	Deep Chand Bandhu	Indian National Congress
1st Assembly	1993	Charti Lal Goel	Sahib Singh Verma	Bharatiya Janata Party	Deep Chand Bandhu	Indian National Congress
1st Assembly	1993	Charti Lal Goel	Sushma Swaraj	Bharatiya Janata Party	Deep Chand Bandhu	Indian National Congress
2nd Assembly	1998	Chaudhary Prem Singh	Sheila Dikshit	Indian National Congress	Madan Lal Khurana	Bharatiya Janata Party
3rd Assembly	2003	Ajay Maken	Sheila Dikshit	Indian National Congress	Vijay Kumar Malhotra	Bharatiya Janata Party
3rd Assembly	2003	Chaudhary Prem Singh	Sheila Dikshit	Indian National Congress	Vijay Kumar Malhotra	Bharatiya Janata Party
4th Assembly	2008	Yoganand Shastri	Sheila Dikshit	Indian National Congress	Vijay Kumar Malhotra	Bharatiya Janata Party
5th Assembly	2013	Maninder Singh Dhir	Arvind Kejriwal	Aam Aadmi Party	Harsh Vardhan	Bharatiya Janata Party
6th Assembly	2015	Ram Niwas Goel	Arvind Kejriwal	Aam Aadmi Party	Vijender Gupta	Bharatiya Janata Party
7th Assembly	2020	Ram Niwas Goel	Arvind Kejriwal	Aam Aadmi Party	Ramvir Singh Bidhuri	Bharatiya Janata Party
7th Assembly	2020	Ram Niwas Goel	Atishi Marlena	Aam Aadmi Party	Vijender Gupta	Bharatiya Janata Party
8th Assembly	2025	Vijender Gupta	Rekha Gupta	Bharatiya Janata Party	Atishi Marlena	Aam Aadmi Party

== Office bearers ==
Office	Holder	Since
Speaker	Vijender Gupta	20 February 2025
Deputy Speaker	Mohan Singh Bisht	20 February 2025
Leader of the House (Chief Minister)	Rekha Gupta	20 February 2025
Leader of Opposition	Atishi Marlena	20 February 2025
Deputy Leader of Opposition	Anil Jha Vats	20 February 2025

== Members of Legislative Assembly ==
District	No.	Constituency	Name	Party	Remarks
North Delhi	1	Narela	Raj Karan Khatri	Bharatiya Janata Party	
Central Delhi	2	Burari	Sanjeev Jha	Aam Aadmi Party	
Central Delhi	3	Timarpur	Surya Prakash Khatri	Bharatiya Janata Party	
North Delhi	4	Adarsh Nagar	Raj Kumar Bhatia	Bharatiya Janata Party	
North Delhi	5	Badli	Deepak Chaudhary	Bharatiya Janata Party	
North West Delhi	6	Rithala	Kulwant Rana	Bharatiya Janata Party	
North Delhi	7	Bawana (SC)	Ravinder Indraj Singh	Bharatiya Janata Party	Cabinet minister
North West Delhi	8	Mundka	Gajender Drall	Bharatiya Janata Party	
North West Delhi	9	Kirari	Anil Jha Vats	Aam Aadmi Party	
North West Delhi	10	Sultanpur Majra (SC)	Mukesh Kumar Ahlawat	Aam Aadmi Party	
West Delhi	11	Nangloi Jat	Manoj Kumar Shokeen	Bharatiya Janata Party	
North West Delhi	12	Mangol Puri (SC)	Raj Kumar Chauhan	Bharatiya Janata Party	
North Delhi	13	Rohini	Vijender Gupta	Bharatiya Janata Party	Speaker
North West Delhi	14	Shalimar Bagh	Rekha Gupta	Bharatiya Janata Party	Chief Minister
North Delhi	15	Shakur Basti	Karnail Singh	Bharatiya Janata Party	
North West Delhi	16	Tri Nagar	Tilak Ram Gupta	Bharatiya Janata Party	
North Delhi	17	Wazirpur	Poonam Sharma	Bharatiya Janata Party	
North Delhi	18	Model Town	Ashok Goel	Bharatiya Janata Party	
Central Delhi	19	Sadar Bazar	Som Dutt	Aam Aadmi Party	
Central Delhi	20	Chandni Chowk	Punardeep Sawhney	Aam Aadmi Party	
Central Delhi	21	Matia Mahal	Aaley Mohammad Iqbal	Aam Aadmi Party	
Central Delhi	22	Ballimaran	Imran Hussain	Aam Aadmi Party	
Central Delhi	23	Karol Bagh (SC)	Vishesh Ravi	Aam Aadmi Party	
New Delhi	24	Patel Nagar (SC)	Pravesh Ratn	Aam Aadmi Party	
West Delhi	25	Moti Nagar	Harish Khurana	Bharatiya Janata Party	
West Delhi	26	Madipur (SC)	Kailash Gangwal	Bharatiya Janata Party	
West Delhi	27	Rajouri Garden	Manjinder Singh Sirsa	Bharatiya Janata Party	Cabinet minister
West Delhi	28	Hari Nagar	Shyam Sharma	Bharatiya Janata Party	
West Delhi	29	Tilak Nagar	Jarnail Singh	Aam Aadmi Party	
West Delhi	30	Janakpuri	Ashish Sood	Bharatiya Janata Party	Cabinet minister
South West Delhi	31	Vikaspuri	Pankaj Kumar Singh	Bharatiya Janata Party	Cabinet minister
South West Delhi	32	Uttam Nagar	Pawan Sharma	Bharatiya Janata Party	
South West Delhi	33	Dwarka	Pradyuman Rajput	Bharatiya Janata Party	
South West Delhi	34	Matiala	Sandeep Sehrawat	Bharatiya Janata Party	
South West Delhi	35	Najafgarh	Neelam Pahalwan	Bharatiya Janata Party	
South West Delhi	36	Bijwasan	Kailash Gahlot	Bharatiya Janata Party	
South West Delhi	37	Palam	Kuldeep Solanki	Bharatiya Janata Party	
New Delhi	38	Delhi Cantonment	Virender Singh Kadian	Aam Aadmi Party	
New Delhi	39	Rajinder Nagar	Umang Bajaj	Bharatiya Janata Party	
New Delhi	40	New Delhi	Parvesh Sahib Singh Verma	Bharatiya Janata Party	Cabinet Minister
South East Delhi	41	Jangpura	Tarvinder Singh Marwah	Bharatiya Janata Party	
South East Delhi	42	Kasturba Nagar	Neeraj Basoya	Bharatiya Janata Party	
South Delhi	43	Malviya Nagar	Satish Upadhyay	Bharatiya Janata Party	
New Delhi	44	R. K. Puram	Anil Kumar Sharma	Bharatiya Janata Party	
South Delhi	45	Mehrauli	Gajender Yadav	Bharatiya Janata Party	
South Delhi	46	Chhatarpur	Kartar Singh Tanwar	Bharatiya Janata Party	
South Delhi	47	Deoli (SC)	Prem Chauhan	Aam Aadmi Party	
South Delhi	48	Ambedkar Nagar (SC)	Ajay Dutt	Aam Aadmi Party	
South East Delhi	49	Sangam Vihar	Chandan Kumar Choudhary	Bharatiya Janata Party	
New Delhi	50	Greater Kailash	Shikha Roy	Bharatiya Janata Party	
South East Delhi	51	Kalkaji	Atishi Marlena	Aam Aadmi Party	Leader of Opposition
South East Delhi	52	Tughlakabad	Sahi Ram	Aam Aadmi Party	
South East Delhi	53	Badarpur	Ram Singh Netaji	Aam Aadmi Party	
South East Delhi	54	Okhla	Amanatullah Khan	Aam Aadmi Party	
East Delhi	55	Trilokpuri (SC)	Ravikant Ujjain	Bharatiya Janata Party	
East Delhi	56	Kondli (SC)	Kuldeep Kumar	Aam Aadmi Party	
East Delhi	57	Patparganj	Ravinder Singh Negi	Bharatiya Janata Party	
East Delhi	58	Laxmi Nagar	Abhay Verma	Bharatiya Janata Party	
Shahdara	59	Vishwas Nagar	Om Prakash Sharma	Bharatiya Janata Party	
East Delhi	60	Krishna Nagar	Anil Goyal	Bharatiya Janata Party	
East Delhi	61	Gandhi Nagar	Arvinder Singh Lovely	Bharatiya Janata Party	Pro tem Speaker
Shahdara	62	Shahdara	Sanjay Goyal	Bharatiya Janata Party	
Shahdara	63	Seemapuri (SC)	Veer Singh Dhingan	Aam Aadmi Party	
Shahdara	64	Rohtas Nagar	Jitender Mahajan	Bharatiya Janata Party	
North East Delhi	65	Seelampur	Chaudhary Zubair Ahmad	Aam Aadmi Party	
North East Delhi	66	Ghonda	Ajay Mahawar	Bharatiya Janata Party	
Shahdara	67	Babarpur	Gopal Rai	Aam Aadmi Party	
North East Delhi	68	Gokalpur	Surendra Kumar	Aam Aadmi Party	
North East Delhi	69	Mustafabad	Mohan Singh Bisht	Bharatiya Janata Party	Deputy Speaker
North East Delhi	70	Karawal Nagar	Kapil Mishra	Bharatiya Janata Party	Cabinet Minister

== See also ==
- Delhi Metropolitan Council
- List of constituencies of the Delhi Legislative Assembly
- List of chief ministers of Delhi
- List of deputy chief ministers of Delhi
- List of speakers of the Delhi Legislative Assembly
