= 7th Delhi Assembly =

Seventh Legislative Assembly of Delhi

←	6th Delhi Assembly	8th Delhi Assembly	→

Overview
- Legislative body: Delhi Legislative Assembly
- Term: 16 February 2020 – 08 February 2025
- Election: 2020 Delhi Legislative Assembly election
- Government: Atishi ministry
- Opposition: BJP

Sovereign
- Lieutenant Governor: Vinai Kumar Saxena

House of the State
- Members: 70
- Speaker of the House: Ram Niwas Goel
- Deputy Speaker of the House: Rakhi Birla
- Leader of the House: Atishi Marlena
- Chief Minister: Atishi Marlena
- Leader of the Opposition: Vijender Gupta
- Deputy Leader of the Opposition: Om Prakash Sharma

Sessions
- 1st: 16 February 2020 – 8 February 2025

The Seventh Legislative Assembly of Delhi was constituted on 16 February 2020 after the 2020 Delhi Legislative Assembly elections were concluded earlier on 8 February 2020 and the results were announced on 11 February 2020. It was the legislative arm of the Government of Delhi.

== History ==
=== Election and government formation ===
Elections for all 70 assembly seats of the Delhi Legislative Assembly were concluded on 8 February 2020 and results were announced on 11 February 2020. The Aam Aadmi Party emerged as a single largest party by winning 62 out of 70 seats with a landslide victory.

The Third Kejriwal ministry was sworn into office after election.

In August 2022 a floor majority test was scheduled in the assembly. Delhi Chief Minister conducted a floor test in the Delhi Assembly to prove that the AAP government enjoyed the majority and BJP's Operation Lotus had failed to poach AAP MLAs.

== Office bearers ==
Office	Holder	Since
Speaker	Ram Niwas Goel	14 February 2015
Deputy Speaker	Rakhi Birla	10 June 2016
Leader of the House (Chief Minister)	Atishi Marlena Singh	17 September 2024
Deputy Chief Minister	Vacant	28 February 2023
Leader of Opposition	Vijender Gupta	5 August 2024

The 7th Delhi Assembly

== Committees ==
S/N	Committee Name	Chairperson	Party Affiliation
1	Business Advisory Committee	Ram Niwas Goel	AAP
2	Committee of Privileges	Somnath Bharti	AAP
3	Committee on Delegated Legislation	Pramila Tokas	AAP
4	Committee on Environment	Mahinder Yadav	AAP
5	Committee on Estimates	Rajesh Gupta	AAP
6	Committee on Ethics	Sanjeev Jha	AAP
7	Committee on Government Assurances	Bhavna Gaur	AAP
8	Committee on Government Undertakings	Jarnail Singh	AAP
9	Committee on Issues Related to Unauthorized Colonies	Naresh Balyan	AAP
10	Committee on Municipal Corporations in Delhi	Som Dutt	AAP
11	Committee on Papers Laid on the Table	Om Prakash Sharma	BJP
12	Committee on Peace and Harmony	Vinay Mishra	AAP
13	Committee on Petitions	Akhilesh Pati Tripathi	AAP
14	Committee on Private Members' Bills & Resolutions	Ram Niwas Goel	AAP
15	Committee on Salary and Other Allowances of MLAs	Sharad Chauhan	AAP
16	Committee on Welfare of Minorities	Abdul Rehman	AAP
17	Committee on Welfare of OBCs	Naresh Yadav	AAP
18	Committee on Welfare of SC/STs	Vishesh Ravi	AAP
19	Committee on Welfare of Students and Youth	Prakash Jarwal	AAP
20	Committee on Women and Child Welfare	Bandana Kumari	AAP
21	General Purposes Committee	Ram Niwas Goel	AAP
22	House Committee on Violation of Protocol Norms and Contemptuous Behaviour by Government Officers with MLAs	Mukesh Kumar Ahlawat	AAP
23	Library Committee	Ajay Mahawar	BJP
24	Public Accounts Committee	Atishi	AAP
25	Questions & Reference Committee	Rakhi Birla	AAP
26	Rules Committee	Ram Niwas Goel	AAP

== Members of Legislative Assembly ==
District	No.	Constituency	Name	Party	Remarks
North Delhi	1	Narela	Sharad Chauhan	Aam Aadmi Party	
Central Delhi	2	Burari	Sanjeev Jha	Aam Aadmi Party	
Central Delhi	3	Timarpur	Dilip Pandey	Aam Aadmi Party	
North Delhi	4	Adarsh Nagar	Pawan Kumar Sharma	Aam Aadmi Party	
North Delhi	5	Badli	Ajesh Yadav	Aam Aadmi Party	
North West Delhi	6	Rithala	Mohinder Goyal	Aam Aadmi Party	
North Delhi	7	Bawana (SC)	Jai Bhagwan	Aam Aadmi Party	
North West Delhi	8	Mundka	Dharampal Lakra	Aam Aadmi Party	
North West Delhi	9	Kirari	Rituraj Govind	Aam Aadmi Party	
North West Delhi	10	Sultan Pur Majra (SC)	Mukesh Kumar Ahlawat	Aam Aadmi Party	Cabinet Minister
West Delhi	11	Nangloi Jat	Raghuvinder Shokeen	Aam Aadmi Party	Cabinet Minister
North West Delhi	12	Mangol Puri (SC)	Rakhi Birla	Aam Aadmi Party	Deputy Speaker
North Delhi	13	Rohini	Vijender Gupta	Bharatiya Janata Party	
North West Delhi	14	Shalimar Bagh	Bandana Kumari	Aam Aadmi Party	
North Delhi	15	Shakur Basti	Satyendra Kumar Jain	Aam Aadmi Party	
North West Delhi	16	Tri Nagar	Preeti Tomar	Aam Aadmi Party	
North Delhi	17	Wazirpur	Rajesh Gupta	Aam Aadmi Party	
North Delhi	18	Model Town	Akhilesh Pati Tripathi	Aam Aadmi Party	
Central Delhi	19	Sadar Bazar	Som Dutt	Aam Aadmi Party	
Central Delhi	20	Chandni Chowk	Parlad Singh Sawhney	Aam Aadmi Party	
Central Delhi	21	Matia Mahal	Shoaib Iqbal	Aam Aadmi Party	
Central Delhi	22	Ballimaran	Imran Hussain	Aam Aadmi Party	Cabinet Minister
Central Delhi	23	Karol Bagh (SC)	Vishesh Ravi	Aam Aadmi Party	
New Delhi	24	Patel Nagar (SC)	Raaj Kumar Anand	Aam Aadmi Party	Resigned on 10 April 2024 and joined the BJP
New Delhi	24	Patel Nagar (SC)	Vacant		
West Delhi	25	Moti Nagar	Shiv Charan Goel	Aam Aadmi Party	
West Delhi	26	Madipur (SC)	Girish Soni	Aam Aadmi Party	
West Delhi	27	Rajouri Garden	Dhanwati Chandela	Aam Aadmi Party	
West Delhi	28	Hari Nagar	Raj Kumari Dhillon	Aam Aadmi Party	
West Delhi	29	Tilak Nagar	Jarnail Singh	Aam Aadmi Party	
West Delhi	30	Janakpuri	Rajesh Rishi	Aam Aadmi Party	
South West Delhi	31	Vikaspuri	Mahinder Yadav	Aam Aadmi Party	
South West Delhi	32	Uttam Nagar	Naresh Balyan	Aam Aadmi Party	
South West Delhi	33	Dwarka	Vinay Mishra	Aam Aadmi Party	
South West Delhi	34	Matiala	Gulab Singh	Aam Aadmi Party	
South West Delhi	35	Najafgarh	Kailash Gahlot	Aam Aadmi Party	Resigned on 17 November 2024
South West Delhi	35	Najafgarh	Vacant		
South West Delhi	36	Bijwasan	Bhupinder Singh Joon	Aam Aadmi Party	
South West Delhi	37	Palam	Bhavna Gaur	Aam Aadmi Party	
New Delhi	38	Delhi Cantonment	Virender Singh Kadian	Aam Aadmi Party	
New Delhi	39	Rajinder Nagar	Raghav Chadha	Aam Aadmi Party	Resigned on 24 March 2022
New Delhi	39	Rajinder Nagar	Durgesh Pathak	Aam Aadmi Party	Won in 2022 bypoll necessitated after resignation by Raghav Chadha
New Delhi	40	New Delhi	Arvind Kejriwal	Aam Aadmi Party	
South East Delhi	41	Jangpura	Praveen Kumar	Aam Aadmi Party	
South East Delhi	42	Kasturba Nagar	Madan Lal	Aam Aadmi Party	
South Delhi	43	Malviya Nagar	Somnath Bharti	Aam Aadmi Party	
New Delhi	44	R K Puram	Pramila Tokas	Aam Aadmi Party	
South Delhi	45	Mehrauli	Naresh Yadav	Aam Aadmi Party	
South Delhi	46	Chhatarpur	Kartar Singh Tanwar	Aam Aadmi Party	Switched to BJP disqualified on 24 September 2024
South Delhi	46	Chhatarpur	Vacant		
South Delhi	47	Deoli (SC)	Prakash Jarwal	Aam Aadmi Party	
South Delhi	48	Ambedkar Nagar (SC)	Ajay Dutt	Aam Aadmi Party	
South East Delhi	49	Sangam Vihar	Dinesh Mohaniya	Aam Aadmi Party	
New Delhi	50	Greater Kailash	Saurabh Bharadwaj	Aam Aadmi Party	Cabinet Minister
South East Delhi	51	Kalkaji	Atishi	Aam Aadmi Party	Chief Minister
South East Delhi	52	Tughlakabad	Sahi Ram	Aam Aadmi Party	
South East Delhi	53	Badarpur	Ramvir Singh Bidhuri	Bharatiya Janata Party	Elected as Member of Parliament, Lok Sabha
South East Delhi	53	Badarpur	Vacant		
South East Delhi	54	Okhla	Amanatullah Khan	Aam Aadmi Party	
East Delhi	55	Trilokpuri (SC)	Rohit Kumar Mehraulia	Aam Aadmi Party	
East Delhi	56	Kondli (SC)	Kuldeep Kumar	Aam Aadmi Party	
East Delhi	57	Patparganj	Manish Sisodia	Aam Aadmi Party	
East Delhi	58	Laxmi Nagar	Abhay Verma	Bharatiya Janata Party	
Shahdara	59	Vishwas Nagar	Om Prakash Sharma	Bharatiya Janata Party	
East Delhi	60	Krishna Nagar	S.K Bagga	Aam Aadmi Party	
East Delhi	61	Gandhi Nagar	Anil Kumar Bajpai	Bharatiya Janata Party	
Shahdara	62	Shahdara	Ram Niwas Goel	Aam Aadmi Party	Speaker
Shahdara	63	Seemapuri (SC)	Rajendra Pal Gautam	Aam Aadmi Party	Switched to INC and resigned
Shahdara	63	Seemapuri (SC)	Vacant		
Shahdara	64	Rohtas Nagar	Jitender Mahajan	Bharatiya Janata Party	
North East Delhi	65	Seelampur	Abdul Rehman	Aam Aadmi Party	
North East Delhi	66	Ghonda	Ajay Mahawar	Bharatiya Janata Party	
Shahdara	67	Babarpur	Gopal Rai	Aam Aadmi Party	Cabinet Minister
North East Delhi	68	Gokalpur (SC)	Surendra Kumar	Aam Aadmi Party	
North East Delhi	69	Mustafabad	Haji Yunus	Aam Aadmi Party	
North East Delhi	70	Karawal Nagar	Mohan Singh Bisht	Bharatiya Janata Party	

== Budget ==
On 26 March 2022, a budget of 75 thousand 800 crore rupees was presented in the Delhi Assembly by the Finance minister Manish Sisodia. AAP leaders expected that the budget would create employment for 20 lakh people in Delhi, in the upcoming five years.

== House Committees (2022–2023) ==
Delhi Legislative Assembly National Capital Territory Of Delhi Composition Of House Committees

=== Financial committees ===
Public Accounts Committee (2022–2023)
Sr. No.	Name	Post	Party
1	Atishi	Chairperson	AAP
2	Bhavna Gaur	Member	AAP
3	Girish Soni	Member	AAP
4	Naresh Balyan	Member	AAP
5	Sanjeev Jha	Member	AAP
6	Som Dutt	Member	AAP
7	Vinay Mishra	Member	AAP
8	Vijender Gupta	Member	BJP
9	Vishesh Ravi	Member	AAP

II Committee on Government Undertakings (2022–23)
Sr. No.	Name	Post	Party
1	Jarnail Singh	Chairperson	AAP
2	Ajesh Yadav	Member	AAP
3	Amanatullah Khan	Member	AAP
4	Bhavna Gaur	Member	AAP
5	Mohan Singh Bisht	Member	BJP
6	Pramila Dhiraj Tokas	Member	AAP
7	Raaj Kumar Anand	Member	AAP
8	Rajesh Gupta	Member	AAP
9	Rohit Kumar	Member	AAP

III Committee on Estimates (2022–23)
Sr. No.	Name	Post	Party
1	Rajesh Gupta	Chairperson	AAP
2	A. Dhanwati Chandela	Member	AAP
3	Ajay Dutt	Member	AAP
4	Ajay Kumar Mahawar	Member	BJP
5	B. S. Joon	Member	AAP
6	Haji Yunus	Member	AAP
7	Kuldeep Kumar	Member	AAP
8	Naresh Yadav	Member	AAP
9	S. K. Bagga	Member	AAP

=== House committees ===
I Business Advisory Committee (2022–23)
Sr. No.	Name	Post	Party
1	Speaker	Chairperson	AAP
2	Deputy Speaker	Member	AAP
3	A. Dhanwati Chandela	Member	AAP
4	Abhay Verma	Member	BJP
5	Dilip Pandey	Member	AAP
6	Jai Bhagwan	Member	AAP
7	Jarnail Singh	Member	AAP
8	Madan Lal	Member	AAP
9	Parlad Singh Sawhney	Member	AAP

II Rules Committee (2022–23)
Sr. No.	Name	Post	Party
1	Speaker	Chairperson	AAP
2	Deputy Speaker	Member	AAP
3	Anil Kumar Bajpai	Member	BJP
4	Kartar Singh Tanwar	Member	AAP
5	Pramila Dhiraj Tokas	Member	AAP
6	Praveen Kumar	Member	AAP
7	Raj Kumari Dhillon	Member	AAP
8	Som Dutt	Member	AAP
9	Surendra Kumar	Member	AAP

III Committee of Privileges (2022–23)
Sr. No.	Name	Post	Party
1	Saurabh Bharadwaj	Chairperson	AAP
2	Akhilesh Pati Tripathi	Member	AAP
3	Bandana Kumari	Member	AAP
4	Bhavna Gaur	Member	AAP
5	Haji Yunus	Member	AAP
6	Mohinder Goyal	Member	AAP
7	Rohit Kumar	Member	AAP
8	S. K. Bagga	Member	AAP
9	Sanjeev Jha	Member	AAP

IV Committee on Welfare of SC/STs (2022–23)
Sr. No.	Name	Post	Party
1	Vishesh Ravi	Chairperson	AAP
2	Ajay Dutt	Member	AAP
3	Girish Soni	Member	AAP
4	Jai Bhagwan	Member	AAP
5	Kuldeep Kumar	Member	AAP
6	Prakash Jarwal	Member	AAP
7	Raaj Kumar Anand	Member	AAP
8	Rohit Kumar	Member	AAP
9	Surendra Kumar	Member	AAP

V Committee on Welfare of OBCs (2022–23)
Sr. No.	Name	Post	Party
1	Naresh Yadav	Chairperson	AAP
2	Ajay Kumar Mahawar	Member	BJP
3	Ajesh Yadav	Member	AAP
4	Gulab Singh	Member	AAP
5	Kartar Singh Tanwar	Member	AAP
6	Madan Lal	Member	AAP
7	Mahender Yadav	Member	AAP
8	Preeti Jitender Tomar	Member	AAP
9	Sahi Ram	Member	AAP

VI Committee on Private Members’ Bills & Resolutions (2022–23)
Sr. No.	Name	Post	Party
1	Speaker	Chairperson	AAP
2	Deputy Speaker	Member	AAP
3	Abdul Rehman	Member	AAP
4	Dilip Pandey	Member	AAP
5	Om Prakash Sharma	Member	BJP
6	Parlad Singh Sawhney	Member	AAP
7	S. K. Bagga	Member	AAP
8	Som Dutt	Member	AAP
9	Somnath Bharti	Member	AAP

VII General Purposes Committee (2022–23)
Sr. No.	Name	Post	Party
1	Speaker	Chairperson	AAP
2	Kartar Singh Tanwar	Member	AAP
3	Madan Lal	Member	AAP
4	Mohinder Goyal	Member	AAP
5	Om Prakash Sharma	Member	BJP
6	Praveen Kumar	Member	AAP
7	Rajesh Rishi	Member	AAP
8	Sahi Ram	Member	AAP
9	Vinay Mishra	Member	AAP

VIIILibrary Committee (2022–23)
Sr. No.	Name	Post	Party
1	Ajay Kumar Mahawar	Chairperson	BJP
2	Abhay Verma	Member	BJP
3	Amanatullah Khan	Member	AAP
4	Jarnail Singh	Member	AAP
5	Pawan Sharma	Member	AAP
6	S. K. Bagga	Member	AAP
7	Shoaib Iqbal	Member	AAP
8	Surendra Kumar	Member	AAP
9	Virender Singh Kadian	Member	AAP

IX Questions & Reference Committee (2022–23)
Sr. No.	Name	Post	Party
1	Deputy Speaker	Chairperson	AAP
2	Atishi	Member	AAP
3	Dhanwati Chandela	Member	AAP
4	Haji Yunus	Member	AAP
5	Mohan Singh Bisht	Member	BJP
6	Naresh Balyan	Member	AAP
7	Prakash Jarwal	Member	AAP
8	Rituraj Govind	Member	AAP
9	Sharad Kumar Chauhan	Member	AAP

X Committee on Government Assurances (2022–23)
Sr. No.	Name	Post	Party
1	Bhavna Gaur	Chairperson	AAP
2	Abhay Verma	Member	BJP
3	Girish Soni	Member	AAP
4	Mukesh Ahlawat	Member	AAP
5	Praveen Kumar	Member	AAP
6	Raghuvinder Shokeen	Member	AAP
7	Sanjeev Jha	Member	AAP
8	Saurabh Bharadwaj	Member	AAP
9	Somnath Bharti	Member	AAP

XI Committee on Petitions (2022–23)
Sr. No.	Name	Post	Party
1	Akhilesh Pati Tripathi	Chairperson	AAP
2	Bandana Kumari	Member	AAP
3	B. S. Joon	Member	AAP
4	Dilip Pandey	Member	AAP
5	Jai Bhagwan	Member	AAP
6	Kartar Singh Tanwar	Member	AAP
7	Kuldeep Kumar	Member	AAP
8	Rajesh Gupta	Member	AAP
9	Saurabh Bharadwaj	Member	AAP

XII Committee on Delegated Legislation (2022–23)
Sr. No.	Name	Post	Party
1	Pramila Dhiraj Tokas	Chairperson	AAP
2	Dinesh Mohaniya	Member	AAP
3	Jitender Mahajan	Member	BJP
4	Pawan Sharma	Member	AAP
5	Preeti Jitender Tomar	Member	AAP
6	Raaj Kumar Anand	Member	AAP
7	Rajesh Rishi	Member	AAP
8	Rohit Kumar	Member	AAP
9	Vijender Gupta	Member	BJP

XIII Committee on Papers Laid on the Table (2022–23)
Sr. No.	Name	Post	Party
1	Om Prakash Sharma	Chairperson	BJP
2	Ajesh Yadav	Member	AAP
3	Jai Bhagwan	Member	AAP
4	Jarnail Singh	Member	AAP
5	Kartar Singh Tanwar	Member	AAP
6	Madan Lal	Member	AAP
7	Parlad Singh Sawhney	Member	AAP
8	Surendra Kumar	Member	AAP
9	Vishesh Ravi	Member	AAP

XIV Committee on Women and Child Welfare (2022–23)
Sr. No.	Name	Post	Party
1	Bandana Kumari	Chairperson	AAP
2	A. Dhanwati Chandela	Member	AAP
3	Atishi	Member	AAP
4	Bhavna Gaur	Member	AAP
5	Mohan Singh Bisht	Member	BJP
6	Pawan Sharma	Member	AAP
7	Preeti Jitender Tomar	Member	AAP
8	Pramila Dhiraj Tokas	Member	AAP
9	Raj Kumari Dhillon	Member	AAP

XV Committee on Environment (2022–23)
Sr. No.	Name	Post	Party
1	Mahinder Yadav	Chairperson	AAP
2	Akhilesh Pati Tripathi	Member	AAP
3	Dilip Pandey	Member	AAP
4	Mohan Singh Bisht	Member	BJP
5	Naresh Balyan	Member	AAP
6	Raaj Kumar Anand	Member	AAP
7	S.K. Bagga	Member	AAP
8	Sahi Ram	Member	AAP
9	Virender Singh Kadian	Member	AAP

XVI Committee on Salary and Other Allowances Of Members of Delhi Legislative Assembly (2022–23)
Sr. No.	Name	Post	Party
1	Sharad Kumar Chauhan	Chairperson	AAP
2	Anil Kumar Bajpai	Member	BJP
3	B. S. Joon	Member	AAP
4	Kuldeep Kumar	Member	AAP
5	Naresh Yadav	Member	AAP
6	Saurabh Bharadwaj	Member	AAP
7	Shiv Charan Goel	Member	AAP
8	Vinay Mishra	Member	AAP
9	Vishesh Ravi	Member	AAP

XVII Committee on Ethics (2022–23)
Sr. No.	Name	Post	Party
1	Sanjeev Jha	Chairperson	AAP
2	Atishi	Member	AAP
3	Amanatullah Khan	Member	AAP
4	Bandana Kumari	Member	AAP
5	Dharam Pal Lakra	Member	AAP
6	Dilip Pandey	Member	AAP
7	Dinesh Mohaniya	Member	AAP
8	Rajesh Gupta	Member	AAP
9	Somnath Bharti	Member	AAP

XVIII Committee on Welfare of Minorities (2022–23)
Sr. No.	Name	Post	Party
1	Abdul Rehman	Chairperson	AAP
2	Amanatullah Khan	Member	AAP
3	Atishi	Member	AAP
4	Haji Yunus	Member	AAP
5	Jarnail Singh	Member	AAP
6	Jitender Mahajan	Member	BJP
7	Parlad Singh Sawhney	Member	AAP
8	Rituraj Govind	Member	AAP

XIX Committee on Welfare of Students and Youth (2022–23)
Sr. No.	Name	Post	Party
1	Prakash Jarwal	Chairperson	AAP
2	Akhilesh Pati Tripathi	Member	AAP
3	Anil Kumar Bajpai	Member	BJP
4	Naresh Yadav	Member	AAP
5	Raghuvinder Shokeen	Member	AAP
6	Rajesh Rishi	Member	AAP
7	Rajesh Gupta	Member	AAP
8	Vinay Mishra	Member	AAP
9	Vishesh Ravi	Member	AAP

XX Committee on Issues Related to Unauthorised Colonies (2022–23)
Sr. No.	Name	Post	Party
1	Naresh Balyan	Chairperson	AAP
2	Ajesh Yadav	Member	AAP
3	Gulab Singh	Member	AAP
4	Jitender Mahajan	Member	BJP
5	Mohinder Goel	Member	AAP
6	Pramila Dhiraj Tokas	Member	AAP
7	Rituraj Govind	Member	AAP
8	Sharad Kumar Chauhan	Member	AAP
9	Vinay Mishra	Member	AAP

XXI House Committee on Violation of Protocol Norms and Contemptuous Behaviour By Government Officers with MLAs - (Elected by the House) (2022–23)
Sr. No.	Name	Post	Party
1	Mukesh Ahlawat	Chairperson	AAP
2	Ajay Dutt	Member	AAP
3	Akhilesh Pati Tripathi	Member	AAP
4	Amanatullah Khan	Member	AAP
5	Mahinder Yadav	Member	AAP
6	Pawan Sharma	Member	AAP

XXII Committee on Peace and Harmony (2022–23)
Sr. No.	Name	Post	Party
1	Vinay Mishra	Chairperson	AAP
2	Ajay Dutt	Member	AAP
3	Ajay Kumar Mahawar	Member	BJP
4	Dilip Pandey	Member	AAP
5	Haji Yunus	Member	AAP
6	Raj Kumari Dhillon	Member	AAP
7	Sanjeev Jha	Member	AAP
8	Saurabh Bharadwaj	Member	AAP
9	Som Dutt	Member	AAP

XXIII Committee on Municipal Corporations in Delhi (2022–23)
Sr. No.	Name	Post	Party
1	Som Dutt	Chairman	AAP
2	Ajesh Yadav	Member	AAP
3	Akhilesh Pati Tripathi	Member	AAP
4	Dinesh Mohaniya	Member	AAP
5	Kuldeep Kumar	Member	AAP
6	Rajesh Gupta	Member	AAP
7	Rohit Kumar	Member	AAP
8	Sanjeev Jha	Member	AAP
9	Shiv Charan Goel	Member	AAP

=== Department Related Standing Committees ===
I Standing Committee on Administrative Matters

(Administrative Reforms; Services; Vigilance; Dte. Of Training (UTCS); Delhi Subordinate Services Selection Board; General Administration Department; Law, Justice & Legislative Affairs; Information Technology)

I Standing Committee on Administrative Matters (2022–23)
Sr. No.	Name	Post	Party
1	Rajesh Rishi	Chairperson	AAP
2	Abhay Verma	Member	BJP
3	Madan Lal	Member	AAP
4	Mukesh Ahlawat	Member	AAP
5	Naresh Balyan	Member	AAP
6	Raj Kumari Dhillon	Member	AAP
7	Shiv Charan Goel	Member	AAP
8	Som Nath Bharti	Member	AAP
9	Virender Singh Kadian	Member	AAP

II Standing Committee on Education : (Education; Higher Education; Training & Technical Education; Art, Culture and Language; Sports)

II Standing Committee on Education (2022–23)
Sr. No.	Name	Post	Party
1	Atishi	Chairperson	AAP
2	B. S. Joon	Member	AAP
3	Praveen Kumar	Member	AAP
4	Raaj Kumar Anand	Member	AAP
5	Shoaib Iqbal	Member	AAP
6	Som Dutt	Member	AAP
7	Vijender Gupta	Member	BJP
8	Vinay Mishra	Member	AAP
9	Virender Singh Kadian	Member	AAP

III Standing Committee on Welfare : (Social Welfare; Labour; Food And Supplies; Employment; Home )

III Standing Committee on Welfare (2022–23)
Sr. No.	Name	Post	Party
1	Rohit Kumar	Chairperson	AAP
2	Ajay Dutt	Member	AAP
3	Bandana Kumari	Member	AAP
4	Bhavna Gaur	Member	AAP
5	Girish Soni	Member	AAP
6	Jarnail Singh	Member	AAP
7	Jitender Mahajan	Member	BJP
8	Kuldeep Kumar	Member	AAP
9	Mahinder Yadav	Member	AAP

IV Standing Committee on Health : (Medical and Public Health; Family Welfare; Directorate of Health Services; Food Safety)

IV Standing Committee on Health (2022–23)
Sr. No.	Name	Post	Party
1	Parlad Singh Sawhney	Chairperson	AAP
2	Atishi	Member	AAP
3	Dharampal Lakra	Member	AAP
4	Dinesh Mohaniya	Member	AAP
5	Mukesh Ahlawat	Member	AAP
6	Om Prakash Sharma	Member	BJP
7	Raj Kumari Dhillon	Member	AAP
8	Sahi Ram	Member	AAP
9	Shoaib Iqbal	Member	AAP

V Standing Committee on Development : (Development; Rural Development; Urban Development; Agricultural Marketing; Revenue; Land and Building; Industries )

V Standing Committee on Development (2022–23)
Sr. No.	Name	Post	Party
1	Mohinder Goyal	Chairperson	AAP
2	A. Dhanwati Chandela	Member	AAP
3	Abdul Rehman	Member	AAP
4	Anil Kumar Bajpai	Member	BJP
5	Gulab Singh	Member	AAP
6	Jitender Mahajan	Member	BJP
7	Naresh Balyan	Member	AAP
8	Prakash Jarwal	Member	AAP
9	Rituraj Govind	Member	AAP

VI Standing Committee on Public Utilities and Civic Amenities : (Public Works Department; Power; Delhi Jal Board; Irrigation and Flood Control)

VI Standing Committee on Public Utilities and Civic Amenities (2022–23)
Sr. No.	Name	Post	Party
1	Rituraj Govind	Chairperson	AAP
2	B. S. Joon	Member	AAP
3	Girish Soni	Member	AAP
4	Gulab Singh	Member	AAP
5	Mahinder Yadav	Member	AAP
6	Mohan Singh Bisht	Member	BJP
7	Preeti Jitender Tomar	Member	AAP
8	Sharad Kumar Chauhan	Member	AAP
9	Shoaib Iqbal	Member	AAP

VII Standing Committee on Finance and Transport :(Finance; Trade And Taxes; Excise & Luxury Taxes; Planning; Transport; Tourism; Departments not allotted to other Committees)

VII Standing Committee on Finance and Transport (2022–23)
Sr. No.	Name	Post	Party
1	Shiv Charan Goel	Chairperson	AAP
2	Abdul Rehman	Member	AAP
3	Ajesh Yadav	Member	AAP
4	Anil Kumar Bajpai	Member	BJP
5	Parlad Singh Sawhney	Member	AAP
6	Pramila Dhiraj Tokas	Member	AAP
7	Preeti Jitender Tomar	Member	AAP
8	Raghuvinder Shokeen	Member	AAP
9	Rajesh Rishi	Member	AAP
