= List of by-elections to the Delhi Legislative Assembly =

The following is a list of by-elections held for the Delhi Legislative Assembly, India, since its formation in 1947.

== 6th Assembly ==
| S.No | Date | Constituency | MLA before election | Party before election | Elected MLA | Party after election |
|---|---|---|---|---|---|---|
| 27 | 9 April 2017 | Rajouri Garden | Jarnail Singh | Aam Aadmi Party | Manjinder Singh Sirsa | Bharatiya Janata Party |
| 7 | 23 August 2017 | Bawana | Ved Parkash | Aam Aadmi Party | Ram Chander | Aam Aadmi Party |

== 7th Assembly ==
| Date | S.No | Constituency | MLA before election | Party before election | Elected MLA | Party after election | Ref. |
|---|---|---|---|---|---|---|---|
| 23 June 2022 | 39 | Rajinder Nagar | Raghav Chadha | Aam Aadmi Party | Durgesh Pathak | Aam Aadmi Party | |
