= List of parliamentary constituencies in Delhi =

== Lok Sabha ==
The Lok Sabha (meaning "House of the People") is the lower house of the Parliament of India. Delhi elects 7 members and they are directly elected by the state electorates of Delhi. Members are elected for a term of five years. The number of seats, allocated to the state/union territory are determined by the population of the state/union territory.

=== Current Constituencies ===
Constituencies in Delhi for the Lok Sabha.

Source: Parliament of India (Lok Sabha) and Chief Electoral Officer, Delhi.

No.	Constituency	Reserved for (SC/ST/None)	Assembly constituency segment	Current member	Party
1	Chandni Chowk	None	4. Adarsh Nagar 14. Shalimar Bagh 15. Shakur Basti 16. Tri Nagar 17. Wazirpur 18. Model Town 19. Sadar Bazar 20. Chandni Chowk 21. Matia Mahal 22. Ballimaran	Praveen Khandelwal	Bharatiya Janata Party
2	North East Delhi	None	2. Burari 3. Timarpur 63. Seemapuri 64. Rohtas Nagar 65. Seelampur 66. Ghonda 67. Babarpur 68. Gokalpur 69. Mustafabad 70. Karawal Nagar	Manoj Tiwari	Bharatiya Janata Party
3	East Delhi	None	41. Jangpura 54. Okhla 55. Trilokpuri 56. Kondli 57. Patparganj 58. Laxmi Nagar 59. Vishwas Nagar 60. Krishna Nagar 61. Gandhi Nagar 62. Shahdara	Harsh Malhotra	Bharatiya Janata Party
4	New Delhi	None	23. Karol Bagh 24. Patel Nagar 25. Moti Nagar 38. Delhi Cantt 39. Rajinder Nagar 40. New Delhi 42. Kasturba Nagar 43. Malviya Nagar 44. R K Puram 50. Greater Kailash	Bansuri Swaraj	Bharatiya Janata Party
5	North West Delhi	SC	1. Nerela 5. Badli 6. Rithala 7. Bawana 8. Mundka 9. Kirari 10. Sultan Pur Majra 11. Nangloi Jat 12. Mangol Puri 13. Rohini	Yogendra Chandolia	Bharatiya Janata Party
6	West Delhi	None	26. Madipur 27. Rajouri Garden 28. Hari Nagar 29. Tilak Nagar 30. Janakpuri 31. Vikaspuri 32. Uttam Nagar 33. Dwarka 34. Matiala 35. Najafgarh	Kamaljeet Sehrawat	Bharatiya Janata Party
7	South Delhi	None	36. Bijwasan 37. Palam 45. Mehrauli 46. Chhatarpur 47. Deoli 48. Ambedkar Nagar 49. Sangam Vihar 51. Kalkaji 52. Tughlakabad 53. Badarpur	Ramvir Singh Bidhuri	Bharatiya Janata Party

== Rajya Sabha ==
The Rajya Sabha (meaning the "Council of States") is the upper house of the Parliament of India. Delhi elects three members and they are indirectly elected by the state legislators of Delhi. The number of seats allocated to the party, are determined by the number of seats a party possesses during nomination and the party nominates a member to be voted on. Elections within the state legislatures are held using single transferable vote with proportional representation.

=== Current members ===
Source: Parliament of India (Rajya Sabha)

No.	Name	Party	Term (DD/MM/YYYY)
1	Narain Dass Gupta	Aam Aadmi Party	28/01/2018 – 27/01/2024
2	Sushil Kumar Gupta	Aam Aadmi Party	28/01/2018 – 27/01/2024
3	Sanjay Singh	Aam Aadmi Party	28/01/2018 – 27/01/2024

== See also ==
- List of constituencies of the Delhi Legislative Assembly
