= List of speakers of the Delhi Legislative Assembly =

Highest authority of the Legislative Assembly of the National Capital Territory of Delhi

Speaker of Delhi Legislative Assembly
- Seal of the Government of Delhi

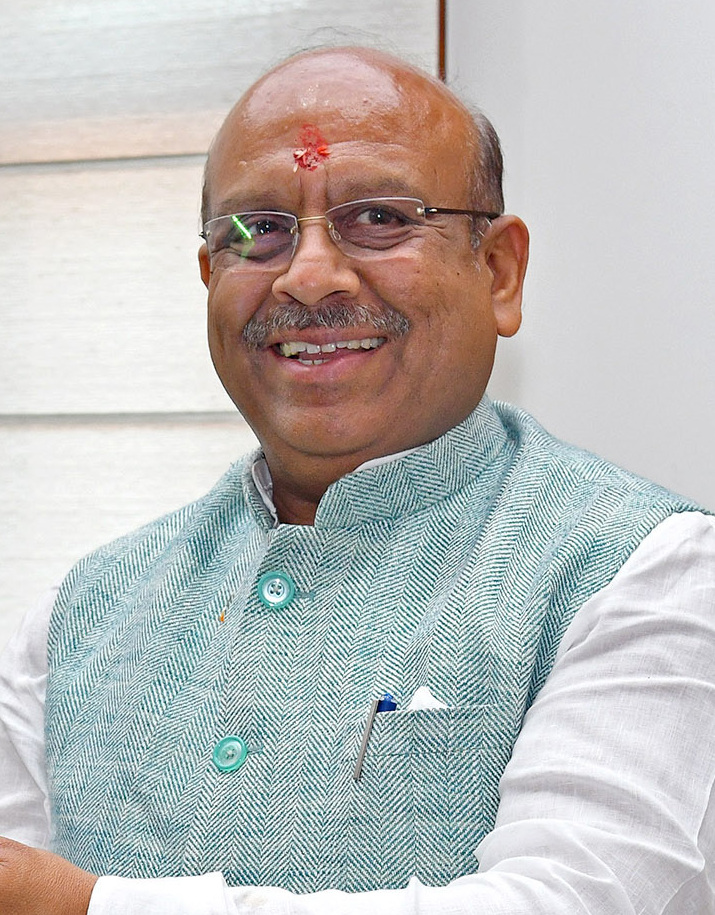
- Incumbent; Vijender Gupta since 20 February 2025
- Style: The Honourable
- Type: Speaker
- Status: Highest authority of the Legislative Assembly
- Member of: Delhi Legislative Assembly
- Residence: AB-9, Tilak Marg, New Delhi
- Seat: Old Secretariat, New Delhi
- Nominator: Members of the Delhi Legislative Assembly
- Term length: During the life of the Delhi Legislative Assembly (five years maximum; renewable)
- Inaugural holder: Charti Lal Goel (1993–1997)
- Deputy: Deputy Speaker of Legislative Assembly

The Speaker of the Delhi Legislative Assembly is the presiding officer of the Legislative Assembly of NCT Delhi, the main law-making body for the Delhi. He is elected by the members of the Delhi Legislative Assembly. The speaker is always a member of the Legislative Assembly.

== List of the Speakers ==
Ram Niwas Goel of Aam Aadmi Party was the incumbent speaker of the Delhi Legislative Assembly since 2015.

No.	Name	Constituency	Term		Party	Assembly (Election)
1	Charti Lal Goel	Model Town	16 December 1993	14 December 1998	Bharatiya Janata Party	First Assembly (1993)
2	Chaudhary Prem Singh	Ambedkar Nagary	14 December 1998	17 June 2003	Indian National Congress	Second Assembly (1998)
3	Subhash Chopra	Kalkaji	17 June 2003	17 December 2003	Indian National Congress	Third Assembly (2003)
4	Ajay Maken	Rajouri Garden	17 December 2003	28 May 2004	Indian National Congress	Third Assembly (2003)
(2)	Chaudhary Prem Singh	Ambedkar Nagary	20 July 2004	15 December 2008	Indian National Congress	Third Assembly (2003)
5	Yoganand Shastri	Mehrauli	19 December 2008	31 December 2013	Indian National Congress	Fourth Assembly (2008)
6	Maninder Singh Dhir	Jangpura	3 January 2014	23 February 2015	Aam Aadmi Party	Fifth Assembly (2013)
6	Ram Niwas Goel	Shahdara	23 February 2015	24 February 2020	Aam Aadmi Party	Sixth Assembly (2015)
6	Ram Niwas Goel	Shahdara	24 February 2020	20 February 2025	Aam Aadmi Party	Seventh Assembly (2020)
7	Vijendra Gupta	Rohini	20 February 2025	Incumbent	Bharatiya Janata Party	Eighth Assembly (2025)

== List of Deputy Speakers ==
No.	Portrait	Name	Constituency	Term		Party	Assembly
1				16 December 1993	14 December 1998	Bharatiya Janata Party	
2				14 December 1998	17 June 2003	Indian National Congress	
3				17 June 2003	17 December 2003	Indian National Congress	
4				17 December 2003	28 May 2004	Indian National Congress	
5				20 July 2004	15 December 2008	Indian National Congress	
6				19 December 2008	31 December 2013	Indian National Congress	
7				3 January 2013	15 February 2015	Aam Aadmi Party	
8		Bandana Kumari	Shalimar Bagh	23 February 2015	24 February 2020	Aam Aadmi Party	
9		Rakhi Birla	Mangolpuri	24 February 2020	20 February 2025	Aam Aadmi Party	
10		Mohan Singh Bisht	Mustafabad	20 February 2025	Incumbent	Bharatiya Janata Party	

== List of Pro tem Speakers ==
- Mateen Ahmed 2013
- Fateh Singh 2015
- Arvinder Singh Lovely 2025
