= Rohini Sector 27 =

Area in Delhi, India

Rohini Sector 27 is an area within the Rohini subcity in Delhi, India. It lies in the North West Delhi district, the Bawana constituency of the Delhi Assembly and the Rohini ward of the North Delhi Municipal Corporation.

The area is home to a resettlement colony with a population of more than 15000. It was set up in 2003 on empty land acquired by the Delhi Development Authority.

The resettlement colony is affected by a number of problems including poor roads, lack of public amenities, water logging, and a high crime rate.
