= Jai Bhagwan =

Jai Bhagwan may refer to:

- Jai Bhagwan (boxer)
- Jai Bhagwan (politician)
