= Imran Hussain =

Imran Hussain can refer to:

- Imran Hussain (British politician) (born 1978), British Labour MP
- Imran Hussain (footballer) (born 1981), Pakistani striker
- Imran Hussain (Indian politician) (born 1981), Former Delhi cabinet minister
- Imran N. Hosein (born 1942), Trinidadian and Tobagonian Islamic preacher
