= Parmila Tokas =

Indian politician

MLA, 06th Legislative Assembly, Delhi
- In office February 2015 – 2025
- Preceded by: Anil Sharma
- Succeeded by: Anil Sharma
- Constituency: R K Puram

Personal details
- Born: Dhansa (New Delhi)
- Citizenship: Indian
- Party: Aam Aadmi Party
- Spouse: Mr. Dheeraj Kumar Tokas (husband)
- Profession: Businessperson, politician

Parmila Tokas is an Indian politician and is member of the Sixth Legislative Assembly of Delhi and Seventh Legislative Assembly of Delhi. She is a member of the Aam Aadmi Party and represented R K Puram (Assembly constituency) of Delhi.

== Early life and education ==
Parmila Tokas was born in Dhansa village in Delhi. Her highest attained educational qualification is HSC from Government Sarvodaya Girls Senior Secondary School, Dhansa. Tokas is a businessperson by profession. In 2013, her husband Dheeraj Kumar Tokas had contest from the same constituency but lost the election.

== Political career ==
Parmila Tokas is a member of the Aam Aadmi Party. Her term as MLA in the Sixth Legislative Assembly of Delhi is her first term. She defeated Anil Kumar Sharma of BJP by a margin of 19,068 votes in the 2015 Delhi Legislative Assembly elections. She represents R K Puram (Assembly constituency) of Delhi.

On 22 December 2015, a complaint was filed by a Central Public Works Department, India worker against Tokas and her husband for an alleged assault against the worker in which several members of the AAP's women's wing took part.

== MLA ==
From 2015 she was Member, Sixth Legislative Assembly of Delhi.

== Member of Legislative Assembly (2020 - 2025) ==
From 2020 till 2025, she was an elected member of the 7th Delhi Assembly.

Committee assignments of Delhi Legislative Assembly

- Member (2022–2023), Committee on Government Undertakings

== See also ==
- Sixth Legislative Assembly of Delhi
- Delhi Legislative Assembly
- Government of India
- Politics of India
- Aam Aadmi Party

== Electoral performance ==
Dhansa Assembly constituency

State Legislative Assembly
Preceded by ?	Member of the Delhi Legislative Assembly from R K Puram Assembly constituency 2020–2025	Succeeded by Anil Sharma
