= Ram Chander (politician) =

Indian politician

Member of the Delhi Legislative Assembly
- In office 2017–2020
- Preceded by: Ved Parkash
- Succeeded by: Jai Bhagwan
- Constituency: Bawana

Personal details
- Party: Aam Aadmi Party
- Parent: Hari Dayal
- Education: 8th Pass

Ram Chander is an Indian politician. He had served as a member of the Delhi Legislative Assembly from 2017 to 2020. He took office after winning a by-election from Bawana first elected in the 2015 Delhi Legislative Assembly election. Chander is affiliated with the Aam Aadmi Party.
