= Ajay Dutt =

Indian politician

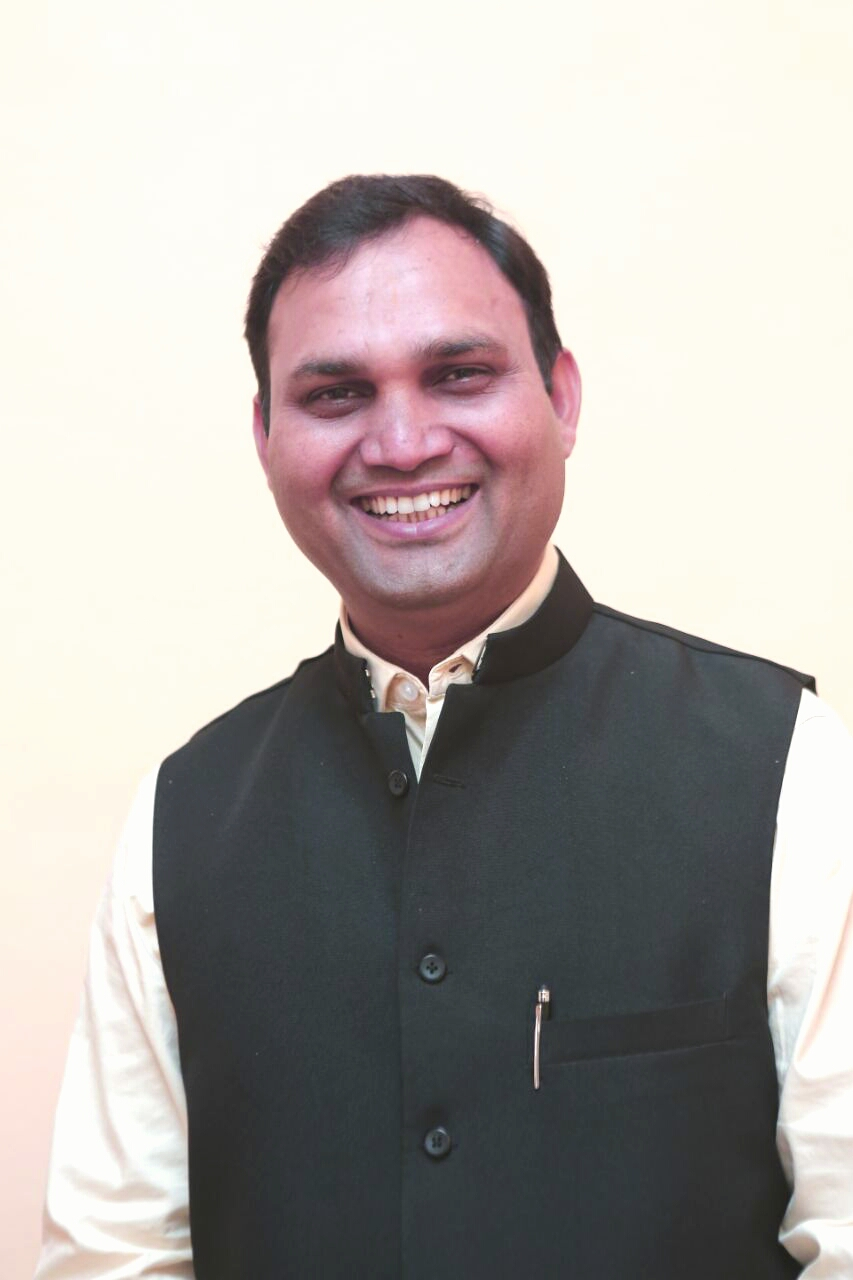

Member of Legislative Assembly Delhi
- Incumbent
- Assumed office 2015
- Preceded by: Ashok Kumar Chauhan
- Constituency: Ambedkar Nagar

Personal details
- Born: 14 July 1975 (age 51)
- Citizenship: Indian
- Party: Aam Aadmi Party
- Spouse: Sunita Dutt (Wife)
- Children: 1 Son and 1 Daughter
- Parent: Banwari Lal (Father)
- Education: Deshbandhu College, Delhi University; Amity University, Noida
- Profession: Politician

Ajay Dutt is an Indian legislator from Dr. Ambedkar Nagar constituency in the Eighth Legislative Assembly of Delhi.

Dutt has held the positions in Delhi government, of District Development Committee (DDC - South Delhi), chairman of the Committee on the Welfare of SC/ST. He was the election Co-Incharge for Punjab and Himachal Pradesh assembly elections, and campaigner in the states of Karnataka, Maharashtra, Himachal Pradesh, Chhattisgarh, Uttar Pradesh, and Punjab.

== Early life and education ==
Ajay Dutt was born in 1975 in Delhi and did his schooling from Delhi and continued his education from Delhi University, graduating in 1998. Soon after graduation, he commenced studying for the Union Civil Services examination with the intention of pursuing a career in public service, but owing to family socioeconomic challenges, he was forced to pursue a career in private sector. Ajay Dutt later earned a master's degree in business administration from Amity University, Noida.

== Professional career ==
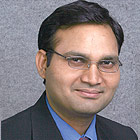
Ajay Dutt during his IT Business Years

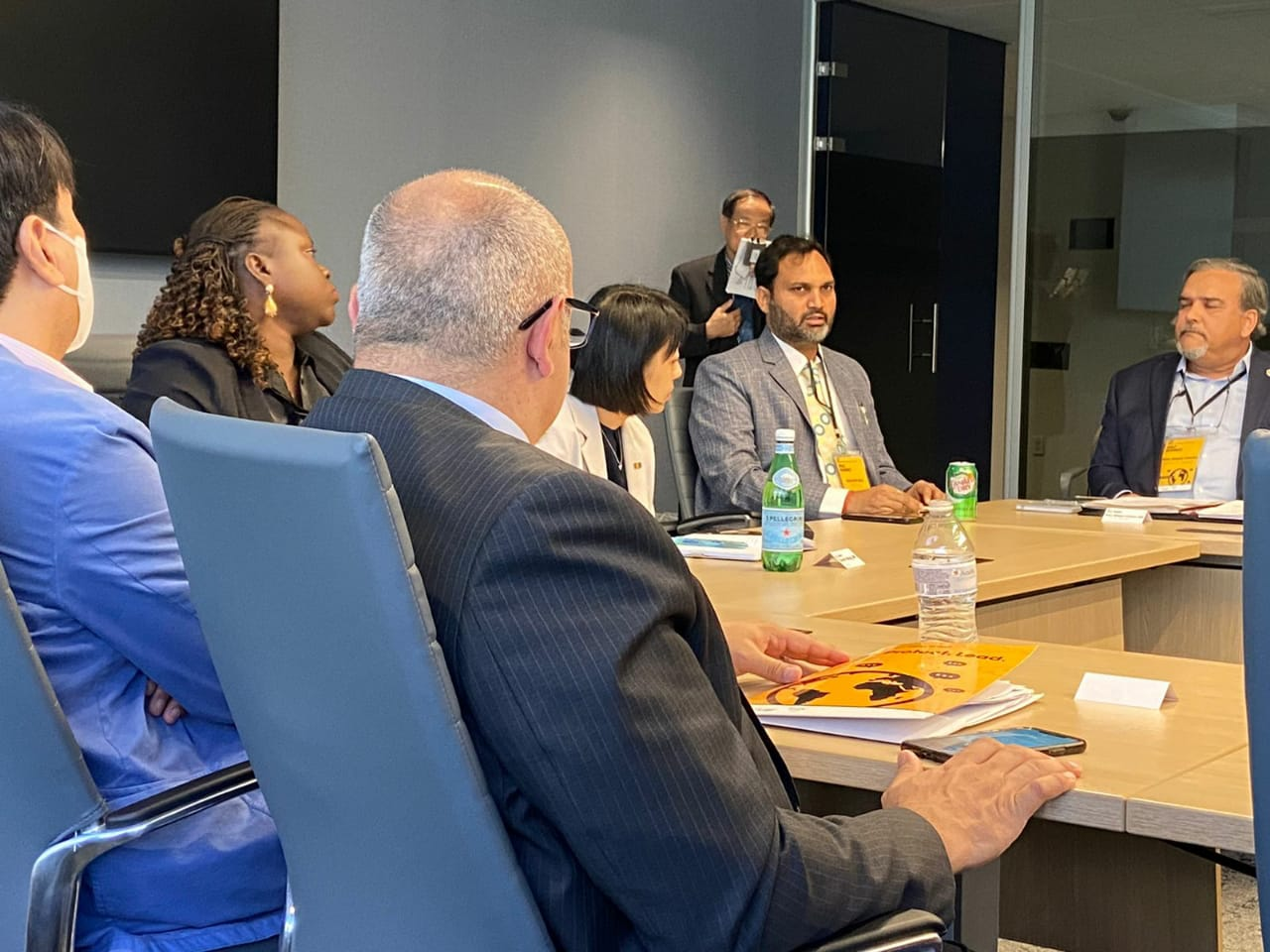
Ajay Dutt at the annual summit of the Inter-Parliamentary Alliance on China (IPAC) in Washington, D.C (2022)

Ajay Dutt worked for 10 years before partnering to start an IT services firm. He is India's co-chairman of Universal Peace Federation, which has a consultative status with the Economic and Social Council of the United Nations. He is also the founding member of Inter-Parliamentary Alliance on China (IPAC). He was also selected to join a team of 19 representatives from nine political parties in India, Sri Lanka, Bangladesh, and Nepal at the Shanghai Party Institute of the CPC's seminar for cadres of political parties in South Asian countries.

Ajay Dutt has been a fervent proponent of the India Against Corruption campaign. He later became a member of the Aam Aadmi Party (AAP) in order to bring about systemic reforms in Indian politics, namely electoral transparency, secular ideals, social justice, and pro-people governance. Ajay Dutt was in charge of the IT firm with which he had collaborated when he chose to join Aam Aadmi Party (AAP) in order to bring about revolutionary changes in Indian politics.

He is a Doctor of Philosophy (Management) from Amity University. The purpose of the research in “Impact of Digital Governance & Social Media Marketing on Public Performance."is to contribute to the understanding of how technology and digitisation can transform governance, empower communities, and enhance public service delivery of the future of democracy, humanity and peaceful world.

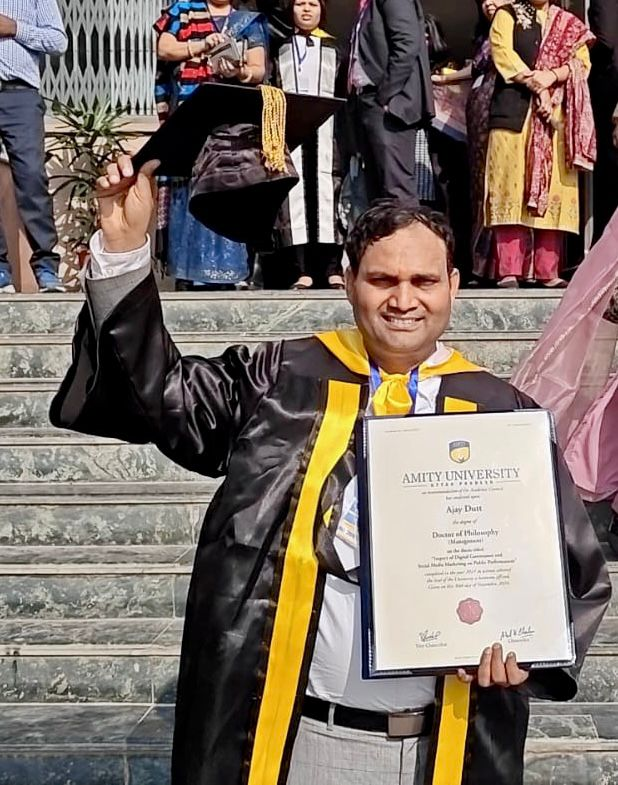
Ajay Dutt at Amity University

== Political career ==
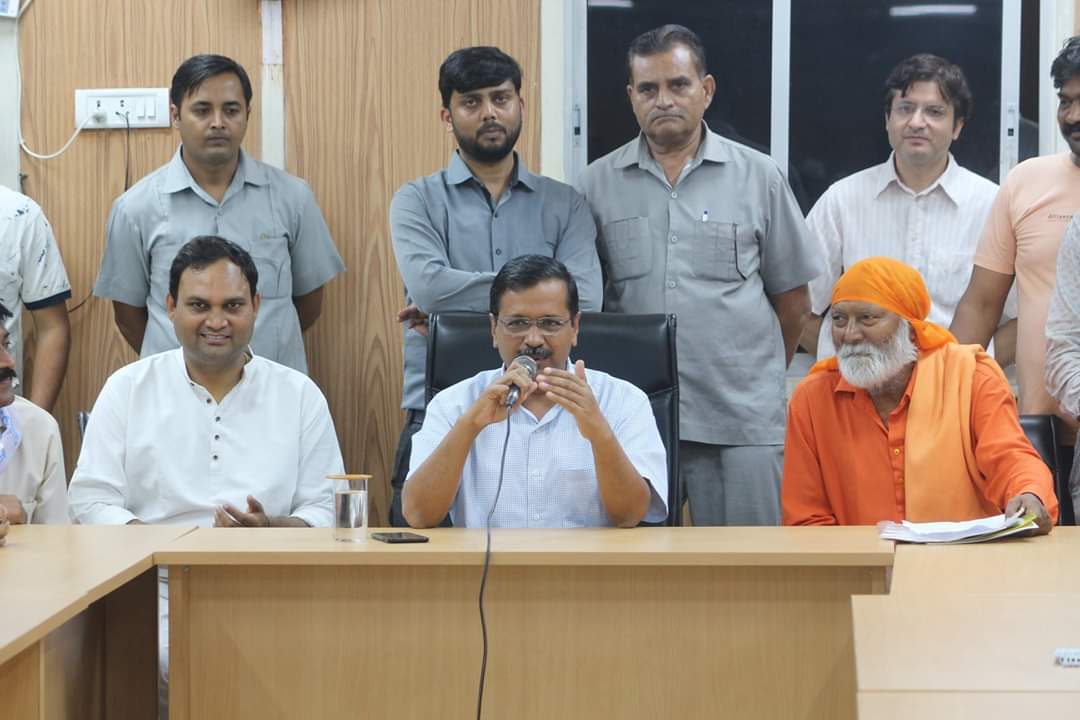
Ajay Dutt with Chief Minister of Delhi Arvind Kejriwal during a press conference in September 2019

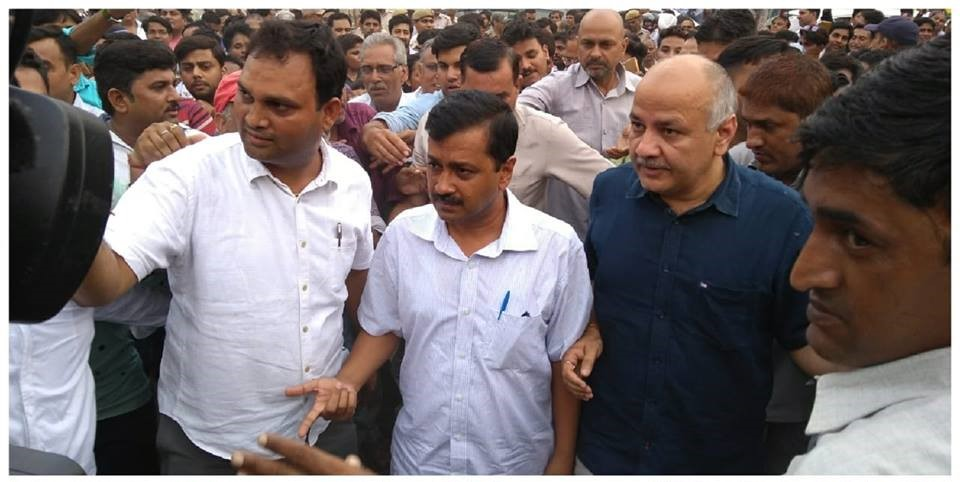
With CM Kejriwal and Dy.CM Manish Sisodia during an inspection of work in Dr. Ambedkar Nagar Constituency

Prior to entering state politics, Ajay Dutt contested and won union elections during his graduate years at Delhi University, where he served as vice-president. Ajay Dutt served as Chairman of the District Development Committee (DDC-South Delhi) and twice as Chairman of the Committee on the Welfare of SC/ST. Ajay Dutt worked on Karnataka's Loksabha election campaign in 2014, served as a star campaigner in Himachal Pradesh, Chhattisgarh, Uttar Pradesh, and Punjab. He was the election co-incharge of Punjab assembly elections which resulted in unprecedented electoral victory.

Ajay Dutt was fielded by the Aam Aadmi Party (AAP) in the 2015 state assembly elections in recognition of his strong participation in the Ambedkar Nagar constituency. Ajay Dutt ousted his predecessor by 42460 votes. Since then, Ajay Dutt has been actively involved in several community development efforts of the Dr. Ambedkar Nagar constituency. Ajay Dutt advocated for the implementation of the old pension scheme for government employees and introduced a bill to the Delhi Vidhan Sabha, which was approved by Delhi Chief Minister Shri Arvind Kejriwal and forwarded to the central government for approval. MLA Ajay Dutt, in response to public uproar, advocated for the scrapping of BRT, a contentious issue which sought to advance faster public transportation by designating a special lane for buses, it underestimated the amount of road space required for other traffic, resulting in gridlock, high pollution from idling vehicles, and frequent accidents on the specially designed stretch from Ambedkar Nagar to Defence Colony. Furthermore, Ajay Dutt facilitated the construction of a 600-bed hospital, 250 new classrooms, a water and sewer line in Khanpur, and the first Metro line in Ambedkar Nagar, which is the most significant work done by any MLA in the history of Dr. Ambedkar Nagar.

MLA Ajay Dutt received the highest score of 4.75 out of 5 in an online poll conducted by www.mlareportcard.com in 2015, making him the most popular MLA in the Delhi Legislative Assembly. Ajay Dutt is widely regarded as one of the most approachable Delhi legislators. Ajay Dutt was named "Mr Popular" in 2016 by Praja Foundation, based on his performance on crucial metrics such as accessibility (among the top 5 MLAs) and public service delivery. Ajay Dutt was rated second among all MLAs believed to be least corrupt in 2018 and also made the Top 5 MLAs list for overall performance. Ajay Dutt has also held significant roles in the Delhi government's numerous committees, the Delhi Legislative Assembly, and the South Delhi district's administrative entities after his election as MLA. Ajay Dutt remains prominent in common parlance as a result of growth and development that transpired during the government's five-year tenure.

In 2019, Ajay Dutt tore his shirt off in the Delhi Assembly in protest over the DDA's destruction of the Ravidas temple (Delhi Development Authority). He claimed unequivocally that if DDA provides the community with four to five acres of land for the Ravidas temple, he would provide the centre with 100 acres of land.

In the 2020 Delhi legislative assembly elections, the Aam Aadmi Party, headed by chief minister Arvind Kejriwal, won 62 seats, securing an absolute majority. Ajay Dutt was re-elected from Dr Ambedkar Nagar Constituency with 62,871 votes (62.84 percent of total votes cast), establishing his credentials as a leader of transformative politics.

In the 2025 Delhi legislative assembly elections, the Aam Aadmi Party, headed by former chief minister Arvind Kejriwal, won 22 seats, and lost to the BJP. Ajay Dutt was re-elected from Dr Ambedkar Nagar Constituency with just 4,230 votes

=== Member of Legislative Assembly (2020 - present) ===
Since 2020, he is an elected member of the 7th Delhi Assembly and 8th Delhi Assembly.

Committee assignments of Delhi Legislative Assembly

- Member (2022-2023), Committee on Estimates

== Posts held ==
Delhi Legislative Assembly - House Committees

#	From	To	Position	Comments
01	2020	–	Member, Seventh Legislative Assembly of Delhi	Incumbent
02	2015	2020	Member, Sixth Legislative Assembly of Delhi	
03	2020	–	Chairman, Committee on Welfare of SC/STs	Presently
04	2020	–	Member, Committee on Environment	Presently
05	2020	–	Member, Committee on Estimates	Presently
06	2020	–	Member, Committee on Privileges	Presently
07	2016	2018	Chairman, Committee on Welfare of SC/STs	
08	2016	2017	Member, Public Accounts Committee	
09	2016	–	Member, Committee on Govt. undertaking	
10	2016	–	Member, Committee on Environment	
11			Member, Delhi Contractual Regulatory Board	

== Electoral performance ==
Delhi Assembly elections, 2025: Ambedkar Nagar
Party	Candidate	Votes	%	±%
AAP	Ajay Dutt	46,285		
BJP	Khushi Ram Chunar	42,055		
INC	Jay Prakash	7,172		
BSP	Seva Das	397		
NOTA	None of the above	498		
Majority		4,230		
Turnout		97,189		
		Swing		

Delhi Assembly elections, 2020: Ambedkar Nagar
Party	Candidate	Votes	%	±%
AAP	Ajay Dutt	62,871	62.25	−6.13
BJP	Khushi Ram Chunar	34,544	34.20	+9.40
INC	Yaduraj Choudhary	2,138	2.12	−3.35
BSP	Satish	620	0.61	−0.22
NOTA	None of the above	496	0.49	−
Majority		28,327	28.05	−15.52
Turnout		1,01,079	64.29	−5.51
AAP hold		Swing	-6.13	

== See also ==
- Seventh Legislative Assembly of Delhi
- Sixth Legislative Assembly of Delhi
- Aam Aadmi Party

State Legislative Assembly
Preceded by Ashok Kumar Chauhan	Member of the Delhi Legislative Assembly from Ambedkar Nagar Assembly constituency 2020–	Incumbent
