= Rekha Gupta ministry =

13th cabinet of Delhi, India

- 13th Ministry of Delhi

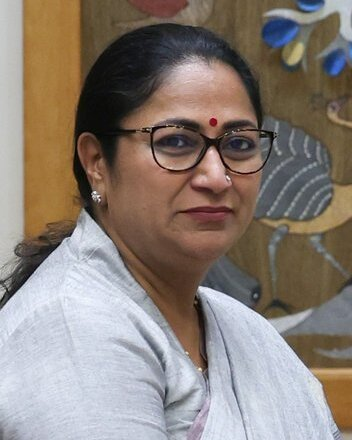
- Rekha Gupta
- Date formed: 20 February 2025

People and organisations
- Lt. Governor: Vinai Kumar Saxena
- Chief Minister: Rekha Gupta
- Member parties: Bharatiya Janata Party
- Status in legislature: Majority
- Opposition party: Aam Aadmi Party
- Opposition leader: Atishi Marlena

History
- Election: 2025
- Legislature term: 5 years
- Predecessor: Atishi Marlena ministry

The Rekha Gupta ministry represents the formation of the 13th cabinet of the Indian state Delhi under the leadership of Rekha Gupta.

Rekha Gupta and her Cabinet ministers took oath on 20 February at Ramlila Maidan. The oath of office administered by Lieutenant Governor VK Saxena at 12:35. Prime Minister Narendra Modi, Union Home Minister Amit Shah, BJP national president J.P. Nadda, Union Ministers, and Chief Ministers and Deputy Chief Ministers from NDA party-ruled states present at the oath taking ceremony.

== Council of Ministers ==
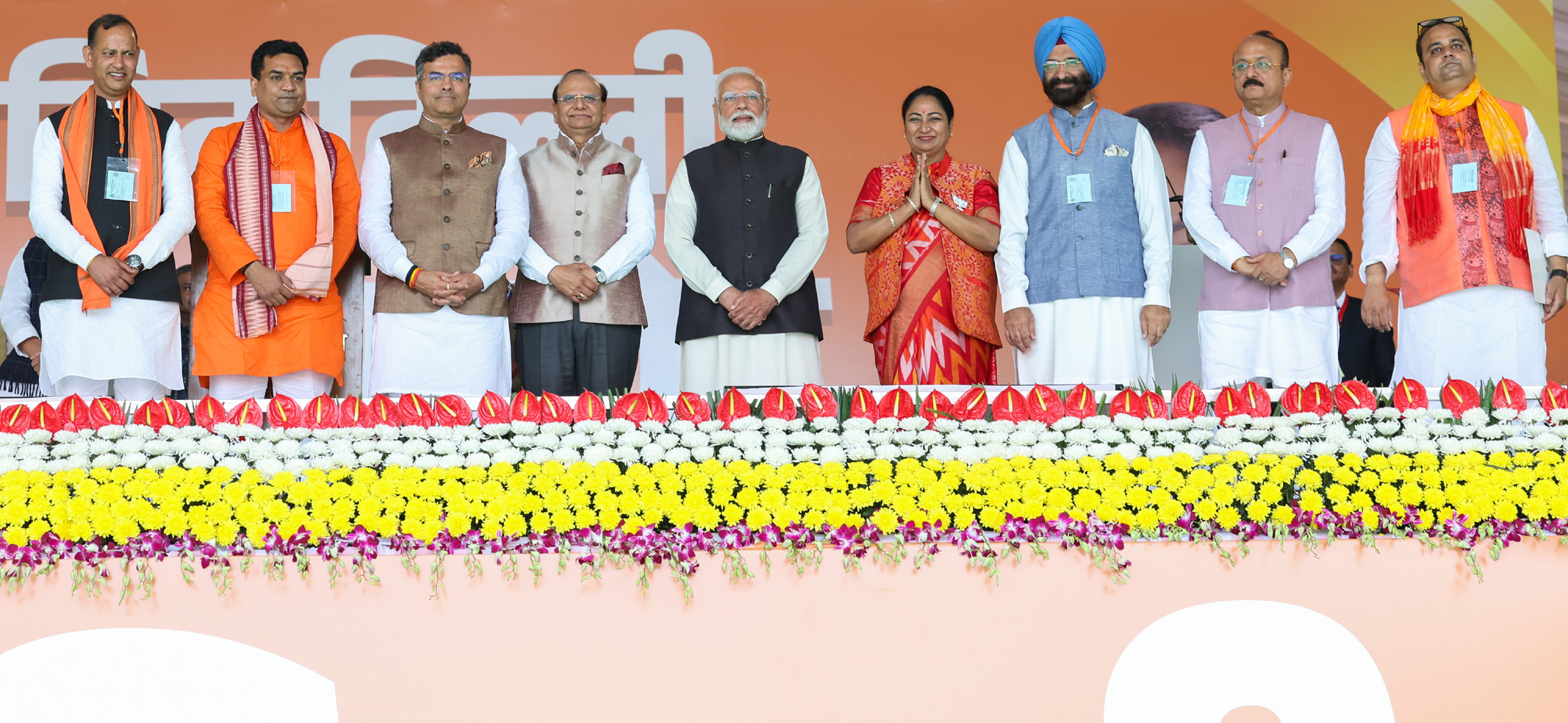

Seven ministers, including Rekha Gupta as Chief Minister, were sworn in by the Lieutenant Governor Vinai Kumar Saxena at Ramlila Maidan, Delhi.

=== Cabinet Ministers ===
| Portfolio | Minister | Took office | Left office | Party | Remarks |
|---|---|---|---|---|---|
| Chief Minister: General Administration; Finance; Planning; Revenue; Women & Child Development; Land & Building; Services; Information & Public Relation; Vigilance; Administrative Reforms; Any other department not allocated to other Ministers. | Rekha Gupta | 20 February 2025 | Incumbent | BJP | |
| Public Works Department(PWD); Legislative Affairs; Gurudwara Elections; Irrigation & Flood Control; Water | Parvesh Verma | 20 February 2025 | Incumbent | BJP | |
| Home; Power; Education; Higher Education; Training & Technical Education | Ashish Sood | 20 February 2025 | Incumbent | BJP | |
| Food & Supplies; Forest & Environment; Industries | Manjinder Singh Sirsa | 20 February 2025 | Incumbent | BJP | |
| Social Welfare; SC & ST Welfare; Cooperative; Elections | Ravinder Indraj Singh | 20 February 2025 | Incumbent | BJP | |
| Law & Justice; Labour; Employment; Development; Art & Culture; Language; Tourism | Kapil Mishra | 20 February 2025 | Incumbent | BJP | |
| Health and Family Welfare; Transport; Information Technology | Pankaj Kumar Singh | 20 February 2025 | Incumbent | BJP | |
