= Ashok Kumar Chauhan =

Indian politician

MLA
- In office 2013–2015
- Preceded by: Ch Prem Singh
- Succeeded by: Ajay Dutt
- Constituency: Ambedkar Nagar

Ashok Kumar Chauhan (known as Ashok Kumar or Ashok Chauhan) is an Indian politician from the Bharatiya Janata Party (BJP). Previously a member of the Aam Admi Party (AAP), he was an MLA from Ambedkar Nagar constituency in the Delhi State Legislature.

== Political career ==
In the 2013 Delhi Legislative Assembly election, Chauhan was declared the Aam Aadmi Party candidate from Ambedkar Nagar. He won the seat, defeating Khushi Ram Chunar of the BJP by 11670 votes.

In 2014, witnessing the autocratic and totalitarian rule of Arvind Kejriwal within AAP, he joined BJP. He believes in the idea of free-speech and constructive criticism and has vowed to change the life of lakhs of poor people living in the nethermost depths of the socio-economic status hierarchy.

In 2015 Delhi Legislative Assembly election, he contested on BJP ticket from Ambedkar Nagar but lost to Aam Aadmi Party's candidate Ajay Dutt by a margin of 42460 votes.
