= Dhanwati Chandela =

Indian politician

Member of the Delhi Legislative Assembly for Rajouri Garden
- In office February 2020 – February 2025
- Preceded by: Manjinder Singh Sirsa
- Succeeded by: Manjinder Singh Sirsa

Personal details
- Party: Aam Aadmi Party

Dhanwati Chandela (born 1960) is an Indian politician in the Aam Aadmi Party. She represented Rajouri Garden in the Sixth Legislative Assembly of Delhi, elected to the post in 2020 after defeating Bharatiya Janata Party candidate Ramesh Khanna. She lost in 2025 to BJP member Manjinder Singh Sirsa.

== Political career ==
Chandela joined the Aam Aadmi Party in 2019 after serving as a 3-term Municipal Corporation of Delhi councillor. Her husband is Dyanand Chandila, a former MLA from Rajouri Garden and Vishnu Garden Assembly seats.

#	From	To	Position	Comments
01	2020	2025	Member, Seventh Legislative Assembly of Delhi	Rajouri Garden Assembly
02	2002	2007	Councillor, Municipal Corporation of Delhi	Guru Nanak Nagar ward
03	1997	2002	Councillor, Municipal Corporation of Delhi	Guru Nanak Nagar ward

=== Member of Legislative Assembly (2020 - present) ===
Since 2020, she is an elected member of the 7th Delhi Assembly.

Committee assignments of Delhi Legislative Assembly

- Member (2022-2023), Committee on Estimates

== Electoral performance ==
=== 2025 ===
Delhi Assembly elections, 2025: Rajouri Garden
Party	Candidate	Votes	%	±%
BJP	Manjinder Singh Sirsa	64,132	55.86	▲20.73
AAP	Dhanwati Chandela	45,942	40.04	▼15.66
INC	Dharampal Chandela	3,198	2.79	▼0.25
NOTA	None of the above	783	0.68	
Majority		18,190	15.84	▼4.73
Turnout		114,806	63.3	▲1.29
BJP gain from AAP		Swing		

Delhi Assembly elections, 2020: Rajouri Garden
Party	Candidate	Votes	%	±%
AAP	Dhanwati Chandela	62,212	55.70	+42.58
BJP	Ramesh Khanna	39,240	35.13	−16.86
Independent	Sukhpal Singh	5,218	4.67	New
INC	Amandeep Singh Sudan	3,398	3.04	−30.19
NOTA	None of the Above	694	0.62	−0.20
Majority		22,972	20.57	+1.81
Turnout		1,11,771	62.01	−10.35
AAP gain from BJP		Swing	+42.58	

=== 2017 results ===
By-election, 2017: Rajouri Garden
Party	Candidate	Votes	%	±%
BJP	Manjinder Singh Sirsa	40,602	51.99	+13.95
INC	Meenakshi Chandela	25,950	33.23	+21.23
AAP	Harjeet Singh	10,243	13.12	−33.43
Independent	Hardeep Singh	225	0.29	N/A
Independent	Davinder Singh Negi	219	0.28	N/A
AIFB	Lalit Taak	211	0.27	N/A
NOTA	None of the Above	641	0.82	+0.27
Majority		14,652	18.76	+10.25
Turnout		78,091	47.32	−25.04
Registered electors		1,68,026		
BJP gain from AAP		Swing	+23.69	

State Legislative Assembly
Preceded by ?	Member of the Delhi Legislative Assembly from Mangol Puri Assembly constituency 2020–	Incumbent
