= Jarnail Singh (politician, born 1973) =

Indian politician (1973–2021)

MLA
- In office 2015–2017
- Preceded by: Manjinder Singh Sirsa
- Succeeded by: Manjinder Singh Sirsa
- Constituency: Rajouri Garden

Personal details
- Born: 1973 Delhi, India
- Died: 14 May 2021 (aged 47–48) Delhi, India
- Party: Aam Aadmi Party
- Education: YMCA Institute for Media Studies and Information Technology
- Profession: Politician, Journalist

Jarnail Singh (1973 – 14 May 2021) was an Indian journalist and politician belonging to the Aam Aadmi Party (AAP). He was a member of the Delhi Legislative Assembly, representing the Rajouri Garden constituency until 6 January 2017, when he resigned as an MLA to contest elections for the AAP against sitting CM Parkash Singh Badal.

== Education and journalism career ==
Jarnail Singh obtained a diploma in journalism from the YMCA Institute for Media Studies and Information Technology. He started his career as a reporter for Amar Ujala. He then worked as a correspondent with the Hindi-language daily Dainik Jagran for over a decade.

Singh gained media attention when he threw a shoe at India's Home Minister P. Chidambaram during a press conference on 7 April 2009. Singh was upset that the minister's party, the Indian National Congress, had given poll tickets to leaders who had been accused of instigating the 1984 anti-Sikh pogrom. The leaders had been "cleared" of any involvement by the Central Bureau of Investigation (CBI) when the Congress government was in power. Responding to Jarnail Singh's question, Chidambaram stated that the CBI had not acted under government pressure, and had only submitted its reports to the court and that it was up to the courts to make a decision. Singh was not satisfied with the answer and threw a shoe at the minister in protest. Singh later stated:

I admit my method was wrong, but the sentiment was right. I do not wish that any journalist should behave in this manner.

Chidambaram did not press charges against him.

== Political career ==
Jarnail Singh contested the 2014 general elections as an AAP candidate from West Delhi. He lost to Pravesh Verma of BJP by a margin of 268,586 votes. In the 2015 Delhi Assembly elections, he won from the Rajouri Garden constituency. He is sometimes confused with Jarnail Singh, an AAP MLA from Tilak Nagar in Delhi.

Singh died from COVID-19 in 2021.
