= Ravinder Indraj Singh =

Indian politician (born 1975)

Cabinet Minister, Government of Delhi
- Incumbent
- Assumed office 20 February 2025
- Lieutenant Governor: Vinai Kumar Saxena
- Chief Minister: Rekha Gupta
- Ministry and Departments: List: * Social Welfare; SC/ST Affairs; Cooperative; Elections
- Preceded by: Mukesh Kumar Ahlawat

Member of the Delhi Legislative Assembly
- Incumbent
- Assumed office 8 February 2025
- Preceded by: Jai Bhagwan
- Constituency: Bawana

Personal details
- Party: Bharatiya Janata Party

Ravinder Indraj Singh (born 1975) is an Indian politician who is currently serving as a cabinet minister of Delhi. He was elected as a Member of the Legislative Assembly representing the Bharatiya Janata Party in the 8th Delhi Assembly from Bawana Assembly constituency in North Delhi district.

== Early life and education ==
Singh is from Bawana, North Delhi district. He is the son of Shri Indraj Singh (ex-MLA, Narela). He completed his BA through distance education from School of Correspondence Courses and Continuing Education, University of Delhi, in 2000. He declared assets over Rs.7 crore before the 2025 Delhi elections.

== Career ==
Singh won from Bawana Assembly constituency representing the Bharatiya Janata Party in the 2025 Delhi Legislative Assembly election. He polled 119,515 votes and defeated his nearest rival, Jai Bhagawan of the Aam Admi Party, by a margin of 31,475 votes.
