= Jai Bhagwan (politician) =

Indian politician (born 1982)

Member of the Delhi Legislative Assembly
- In office 16 February 2020 – 2025
- Preceded by: Ram Chander
- Succeeded by: Ravinder Indraj Singh
- Constituency: Bawana

Personal details
- Born: 1982 (age 43–44)
- Party: Aam Aadmi Party
- Profession: Politician

Jai Bhagwan Upkar (born 1982) is an Indian politician affiliated with the Aam Aadmi Party and a member of the 7th Delhi Assembly. He had served as a member of the Delhi Legislative Assembly from 2020 till 2025, in the Bawana constituency of Delhi.

== Political career ==
In the 2020 Delhi election, Bhagwan was elected to Delhi Legislative Assembly from Bawana constituency in the 7th Delhi Assembly.

== Electoral performance ==
=== 2025 ===
2025 Delhi Legislative Assembly elections:Bawana
Party	Candidate	Votes	%	±%
BJP	Ravinder Indraj Singh	119,515	51.99	▲9.44
AAP	Jai Bhagwan	88,040	38.30	▼10.08
INC	Surender Kumar	18,713	8.14	▲1.67
NOTA	None of the above	1,346	0.59	
Majority		31,475	13.69	▲7.86
Turnout		2,28,510	59.7	▼2.27
BJP gain from AAP		Swing		

2020 Delhi Legislative Assembly elections: Bawana
Party	Candidate	Votes	%	±%
AAP	Jai Bhagwan	95,715	48.38	–9.76
BJP	Ravinder Kumar	84,189	42.55	+11.39
INC	Surender Kumar	12,803	6.47	–1.40
BSP	Ranjit Ram	1,941	0.98	–0.96
CPI	Abhipsa Chauhan	1,227	0.62	N/A
NOTA	None of the above	1,046	0.53	+0.07
Majority		11,526	5.83	–21.15
Turnout		1,98,040	61.97	+0.16
AAP hold		Swing	–9.76	

== See also ==
- Aam Aadmi Party
- Bawana
- Delhi Legislative Assembly
- Politics of India
- 7th Delhi Assembly
