= Atishi Marlena ministry =

Cabinet of NCT of Delhi (2024-25)

- 12th Ministry of Delhi

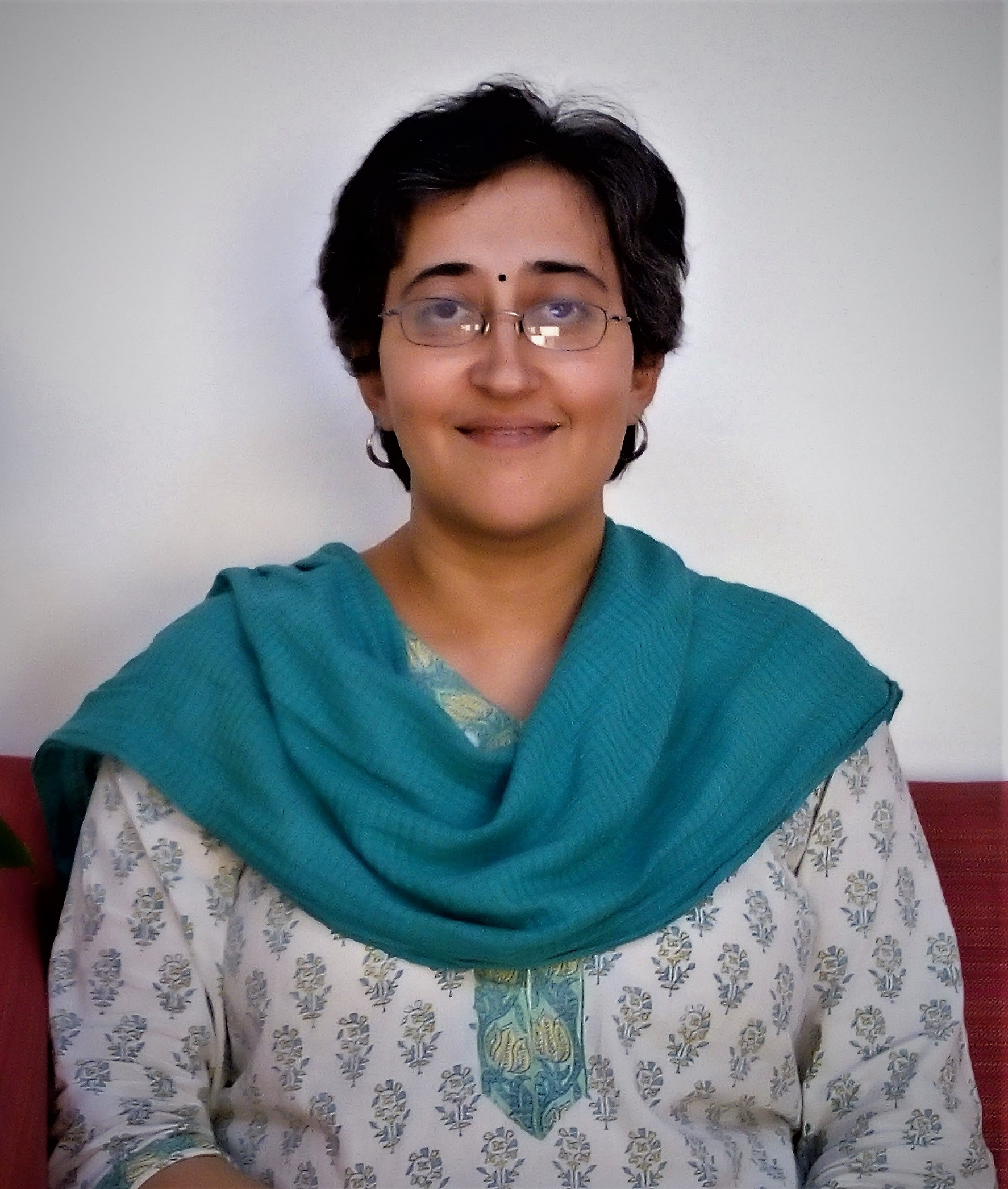
- Date formed: 21 September 2024
- Date dissolved: 9 February 2025

People and organisations
- Head of state: Lt. Governor V. K. Saxena
- Head of government: Atishi Marlena
- No. of ministers: 5
- Member parties: Aam Aadmi Party
- Status in legislature: Majority
- Opposition party: Bharatiya Janata Party

History
- Predecessor: Third Kejriwal ministry
- Successor: Rekha Gupta ministry

The 12th Council of Ministers of National Capital Territory of Delhi was formed on 21 September 2024 and dissolved on 9 February 2025 with Chief Minister Atishi Marlena leading the government. The ministry also consisted of 6 Aam Aadmi Party MLAs of the Delhi Assembly, who were sworn in by Lieutenant Governor V. K. Saxena.

== History ==
The ministry was formed after outgoing Chief Minister and leader of Aam Aadmi Party Arvind Kejriwal resigned on 17 September following his bail by the Supreme Court of India regarding 2022 Delhi liquor scam case, upon conditions of not entering the Delhi Secretariat and signing any file without Lieutenant Governor's consent.

After getting bail, Kejriwal said he will resign from the office of Chief Minister of Delhi within two days. There were a lot of speculations among the media that senior cabinet member Atishi might be the next chief minister. However, she said in an interview that the party will decide about it.

On 19 September, Aam Aadmi Party MLAs chose Atishi to be chief minister-designate. Lieutenant Governor Saxena approved Atishi's appointment on 21 September.

== Council of Ministers ==
Following the oath-taking ceremony, Atishi had allocated other 5 members of the council and the portfolios as follows:

No.	Name	Office	Departments	Took Office	Left Office	Party
1.	Atishi Marlena	Chief Minister	Chief Minister; Public Works Department; Power; Education; Higher Education; Training and Technical Education; Public Relations; Revenue; Finance; Planning; Services; Vigilance; Water; Law (and all other portfolios yet to be allocated); Other departments not allocated to any Minister.	21 September 2024	9 February 2025	AAP
2.	Saurabh Bharadwaj	Cabinet Minister	Health; Industries; Urban Development; Irrigation and Flood Control; Art, Culture and Language; Tourism; Social Welfare; Cooperative	21 September 2024	9 February 2025	AAP
3.	Imran Hussain	Cabinet Minister	Food & Supply; Election	21 September 2024	9 February 2025	AAP
4.	Kailash Gahlot	Cabinet Minister	Transport; Administrative Reforms; Information and Technology; Home; Women and Child Development	21 September 2024	17 November 2024 (RES)	AAP
5.	Gopal Rai	Cabinet Minister	Development; General Administration; Environment, Forest and Wild life	21 September 2024	9 February 2025	AAP
6.	Mukesh Ahlawat	Cabinet Minister	SC and ST; Gurudwara elections; Labour; Employment; Land and Building	21 September 2024	9 February 2025	AAP
