= Jarnail Singh (politician, born 1981) =

Indian politician

Member of the Delhi Legislative Assembly
- Incumbent
- Assumed office 14 February 2015
- Preceded by: President's rule
- Constituency: Tilak Nagar
- In office 28 December 2013 – 14 February 2014
- Preceded by: O P Babbar
- Succeeded by: President's rule
- Constituency: Tilak Nagar

Personal details
- Born: 15 March 1981 (age 45) Rampur, Uttar Pradesh, India
- Citizenship: India
- Party: Aam Aadmi Party
- Spouse: Sukhjeet Kaur
- Children: 2
- Occupation: Politician
- Website: aapkajarnailsingh.com

Jarnail Singh (born 15 March 1981) is a politician in the Aam Aadmi Party (AAP). He was elected to the 5th Delhi Assembly in 2013, to the 6th Delhi Assembly in 2015, the 7th Delhi Assembly in 2020, and the 8th Delhi Assembly in 2025. He is a four-time representative for Tilak Nagar constituency.

== Personal life ==
Jarnail Singh was born on 15 March 1981 in Rampur. He was brought up in Delhi by his father, Harbajan Singh who was a farmer, now a businessman and mother Surjit Kaur. Singh completed his education until 12th grade. In the year 2006, he became the General Secretary of Water Purification and treatment equipment manufacturer association (WAPTEMA). In 2010, he married Sukhjeet Kaur. Currently, he is positioned as the Chairman of WAPTEMA.

== Early life and education ==
Hailing from a middle class family, Jarnail Singh was born on 15 March 1981 in Rampur. He was raised in Delhi by his parents, Harbajan Singh, a farmer-turned-businessman, and Surjit Kaur. Singh completed his education up to the 12th grade. Due to the responsibility of supporting his family, Singh began working as a full-time technician at an air conditioner workshop right after completing his schooling.

== Career ==
=== Sales Industry ===
After working as an AC technician for 3 years from 15 years to 18 years of age, Singh transitioned to a role as a salesman for a vacuum cleaner company, responsible for door-to-door promotion and sales.

=== Water Purification Industry ===
Jarnail Singh entered the water purification industry in the early years of his career. He started his journey in the industry as a R.O. System Technician and used to perform door to door installation and service of the R.O. Systems. He established a Private Limited Company and started a R.O. System Manufacturing Unit in Baddi, Himachal Pradesh. Singh later became the General Secretary of the Water Purification and Treatment Equipment Manufacturer Association (WAPTEMA). Currently, he serves as the Chairman of WAPTEMA.

== Politics ==
=== Early Involvement ===
In 2011, when Arvind Kejriwal along with numerous other activists joined Anna Hazare to form the India Against Corruption (IAC) group, it brought Singh’s attention and he started participating in the movement, which sparked his interest in social activism. The IAC demanded enactment of the Jan Lokpal Bill, which would result in a strong ombudsman. The campaign evolved into the 2011 Indian anti-corruption movement. One of the major criticisms directed at the Jan Lokpal activists was that they had no right to dictate terms to the elected representatives. As a result, Arvind Kejriwal and other activists including Singh decided to enter politics and contest elections.In November 2012, they formally launched the Aam Aadmi Party.

==== Punjab Elections 2022 ====
Jarnail Singh was appointed the in-charge of AAP Punjab unit ahead of the 2022 Punjab Assembly elections.

==== Delhi Elections ====
In December 2013, the newly formed Aam Aadmi Party contested elections for the first time and thereby Jarnail Singh won the elections and became the “Youngest Sikh MLA” of Delhi Legislative Assembly. He defeated Rajiv Babbar, the son of 3-time MLA OP Babbar, by over 2000 votes. In the same year, Jarnail was elected as the chairman of the District Development Committee. The AAP minority government dissolved 49 days after the 2013 elections and a period of President's Rule commenced. In 2014, he was appointed the first President of AAP youth wing. At the subsequent elections in February 2015, 2020 and 2025, Singh was re-elected as MLA for Tilak Nagar.

Jarnail Singh won the Tilak Nagar election in 2025.

=== Activism ===
In 2011, Anna Hazare launched the Jan Lokpal movement. Jarnail Singh was involved in this movement.

=== Member of Legislative Assembly (2020 - present) ===
Since 2020, he is an elected member of the 6th Delhi Assembly,7th Delhi Assembly & 8th Delhi Assembly.

Committee assignments of Delhi Legislative Assembly

- Chairperson (2022-2023), Committee on Government Undertakings

=== Electoral performance ===
Delhi Assembly elections, 2015: Tilak Nagar
Party	Candidate	Votes	%	±%
AAP	Jarnail Singh	57,180	55.10	+15.83
BJP	Rajiv Babbar	37,290	35.93	−0.97
INC	Duli Chand Lohia	7,303	7.04	−14.73
Independent	Jarnail Singh	570	0.55	
RABP	Rajiv Babbar	253	0.24	
BSP	Vijay Bahadur	250	0.24	−0.23
NOTA	None	464	0.45	−0.25
Majority		19,890	19.17	+16.79
Turnout		1,03,815	70.65	
AAP hold		Swing	+15.83	

Delhi Assembly elections, 2020: Tilak Nagar
Party	Candidate	Votes	%	±%
AAP	Jarnail Singh	62,436	62.20	+7.10
BJP	Rajiv Babbar	34,407	34.28	−1.65
INC	Raminder Singh	1,807	1.80	−5.24
AAAP	Jarnail Singh	527	0.52	
NOTA	None of the above	522	0.52	+0.07
Majority		28,029	28.06	+8.89
Turnout		1,00,392	63.96	−6.69
AAP hold		Swing	+7.10	

Delhi Assembly elections, 2025: Tilak Nagar
Party	Candidate	Votes	%	±%
AAP	Jarnail Singh	52,134	54.0	−8.20
BJP	Shweta Saini	40,478	41.9	+7.62
INC	PS Bawa	2,747	2.9	+1.10
NOTA	None of the above	607	0.4	−0.12
Majority		11,656	12.2	
Turnout		95,896	60.3	
AAP hold		Swing		

State Legislative Assembly
Preceded by ?	Member of the Delhi Legislative Assembly from Tilak Nagar Assembly constituency 2020–	Incumbent
