= Imran Hussain (Indian politician) =

Cabinet minister in Delhi, India (born 1981)

Cabinet Minister, Government of Delhi
- In office 21 September 2024 – 8 February 2025
- Lieutenant Governor: Vinai Kumar Saxena
- Chief Minister: Atishi Marlena Singh
- Ministry and Departments: Food & supply; Elections
- Preceded by: Himself
- Succeeded by: Manjinder Singh Sirsa

Cabinet Minister, Government of Delhi
- In office 16 February 2020 – 17 September 2024
- Lieutenant Governor: Najeeb Jung Anil Baijal Vinai Kumar Saxena
- Chief Minister: Arvind Kejriwal
- Ministry and Departments: Food & supply, Forest, Elections
- Preceded by: Asim Ahmed Khan
- Succeeded by: Himself

Member of the Delhi Legislative Assembly
- Incumbent
- Assumed office 12 February 2015
- Preceded by: Haroon Yusuf
- Constituency: Ballimaran

Personal details
- Born: 21 May 1981 (age 45) New Delhi, India
- Party: Aam Aadmi Party
- Spouse: Naghma Imran
- Children: 3
- Parent: Abrar Hussain (father)
- Education: Jamia Millia Islamia
- Profession: Politician, businessperson
- Religion: Islam

Imran Hussain (born 21 May 1981) is an Indian politician and a member of the 7th Delhi Assembly in New Delhi, India. He represents the Ballimaran (Delhi Assembly constituency) and is a member of the Aam Aadmi Party. He had served in the Delhi Cabinet as a Minister of Food and Civil Supplies and Election.

== Early life and education ==
Imran Hussain was born in New Delhi. He comes from the walled city area of Delhi. He studied at Crescent School in Daryaganj. He attended the Jamia Millia Islamia and attained Bachelor of Business Studies degree. Then he joined the family garment business after completing his Bachelor of Business Studies degree.

== Political career ==
Imran Hussain contested and won the councillor elections from Ballimaran as a candidate of Rashtriya Lok Dal in April 2012. He represented the Ballimaran constituency in the Delhi Legislative Assembly after winning the 2015 Delhi Legislative Assembly elections and is a member of the Aam Aadmi Party political party. He was inducted into the Delhi Cabinet as a Minister of Food and Civil Supplies and Election on 18 October 2015. He was re-elected in the 2020 Delhi Legislative Assembly election and became an MLA in the Sixth Legislative Assembly of Delhi.

Since February 3, 2020, he is a Member of the Seventh Legislative Assembly of Delhi.

=== Cabinet Minister, Delhi ===
He was a cabinet minister in the Third Kejriwal ministry and held the charge of below listed departments of the Government of Delhi.

- Food Supplies
- Forest
- Elections

== Electoral performance ==
Delhi Assembly elections, 2013: Ballimaran
Party	Candidate	Votes	%	±%
INC	Haroon Yusuf	32,105	36.18	−5.90
BJP	Moti Lal Sodhi	24,012	27.06	−7.45
BSP	Imran Hussain	16,267	18.33	+5.79
AAP	Farhana Anjum	13,103	14.76	
LJP	Vijay Kumar	1,036	1.17	−6.71
NOTA	None	385	0.43	
Majority		8,093	9.12	+1.55
Turnout		88,771	67.47	
INC hold		Swing	-5.90	

Delhi Assembly elections, 2015: Ballimaran
Party	Candidate	Votes	%	±%
AAP	Imran Hussain	57,118	59.71	+44.95
BJP	Shyam Lal Morwal	23,241	24.29	−2.77
INC	Haroon Yusuf	13,205	13.80	−22.38
BSP	Dilip Kumar	438	0.45	−17.88
RPI(A)	Mohd. Danish	130	0.14	+0.08
NOTA	None of the above	304	0.31	−0.12
Majority		33,877	35.42	+26.30
Turnout		95,663	67.95	
Registered electors		1,40,776		
AAP gain from INC		Swing	+33.76	

Delhi Assembly elections, 2020: Ballimaran
Party	Candidate	Votes	%	±%
AAP	Imran Hussain	65,644	64.65	+4.94
BJP	Lata	29,472	29.03	+4.73
INC	Haroon Yusuf	4,802	4.73	−9.07
BRD	Krishan Kumar	340	0.33	N/A
NOTA	None of the above	340	0.33	+0.01
Majority		36,172	35.62	+0.21
Turnout		1,01,548	71.64	+3.69
Registered electors		1,41,844		
AAP hold		Swing	+4.94	

=== 2025 ===
Delhi Assembly elections, 2025: Ballimaran
Party	Candidate	Votes	%	±%
AAP	Imran Hussain	57,004	58	
BJP	Kamal Bagri	27,181	27.66	
INC	Haroon Yusuf	13,059	13.29	
NCP	Mohammed Haroon	38	0.04	
BSP	Sonu Kumar	190	0.19	
Aam Aadmi Parivartan Party	Abrar	224	0.23	
NOTA	None of the above	301	0.31	
Majority		29,823	30.34	
Turnout		98,277		
		Swing		

State Legislative Assembly
Preceded by ?	Member of the Delhi Legislative Assembly from Ballimaran Assembly constituency 2020–	Incumbent
Aam Aadmi Party political offices
Preceded by -	Member of National Executive Committee; Aam Aadmi Party – present	Incumbent
