= Manjinder Singh Sirsa =

Indian politician

Cabinet Minister, Government of Delhi
- Incumbent
- Assumed office 20 February 2025
- Lieutenant Governor: Vinai Kumar Saxena
- Chief Minister: Rekha Gupta
- Ministry and Departments: Food & Supplies; Forest & Environment; Industries
- Preceded by: Imran Hussain

Member of the Delhi Legislative Assembly
- Incumbent
- Assumed office 2025
- Preceded by: Dhanwati Chandela
- Constituency: Rajouri Garden
- In office 2017–2020
- Preceded by: Jarnail Singh
- Succeeded by: Dhanwati Chandela
- Constituency: Rajouri Garden
- In office 2013–2015
- Preceded by: Dyanand Chandila
- Succeeded by: Jarnail Singh
- Constituency: Rajouri Garden

Personal details
- Born: 28 February 1972 (age 54) Sirsa, Haryana, India
- Party: Bharatiya Janata Party (2021-present)
- Other political affiliations: Shiromani Akali Dal (until 2021)
- Education: SGTB Khalsa College, Delhi University (dropped out)

Manjinder Singh Sirsa (born Manjinder Singh Riar; born 28 February 1972) is an Indian politician who is serving as a cabinet minister in the Government of Delhi and National Secretary of the Bharatiya Janata Party. Sirsa is a member of the Delhi Legislative Assembly, representing Rajouri Garden.

== Political career ==
He was the Member of the Legislative Assembly (MLA) for Rajouri Garden, New Delhi, from 2013 to 2015 while being in the Shiromani Akali Dal (SAD). He lost his seat in the 2015 Delhi Legislative Assembly election. In the 2017 bypolls he contested on a Bharatiya Janata Party (BJP) ticket, while being a member of the SAD.

He was also the President of Delhi Sikh Gurdwara Management Committee, elected first in 2013 and then again in 2017. Sirsa defeated outgoing president Paramjit Singh Sarna in the 2013 elections.

On 1 December 2021, he resigned from SAD, citing personal grounds and joined the BJP. In August 2023, he was appointed National Secretary of the BJP. He was elected as MLA from Rajouri Garden, defeating sitting MLA Dhanwati Chandela by 18190 votes.

In 2025, Sirsa was re-elected to the Delhi Legislative Assembly election and was appointed a minister of Food & Supplies, Forest & Environment, Industries.

== Electoral performance ==
Delhi Assembly elections, 2025: Rajouri Garden
Party	Candidate	Votes	%	±%
BJP	Manjinder Singh Sirsa	64,132	55.86	▲20.73
AAP	Dhanwati Chandela	45,942	40.04	▼15.66
INC	Dharampal Chandela	3,198	2.79	▼0.25
NOTA	None of the above	783	0.68	
Majority		18,190	15.84	▼4.73
Turnout		114,806	63.3	▲1.29
BJP gain from AAP		Swing		

By-election, 2017: Rajouri Garden
Party	Candidate	Votes	%	±%
BJP	Manjinder Singh Sirsa	40,602	51.99	+13.95
INC	Meenakshi Chandela	25,950	33.23	+21.23
AAP	Harjeet Singh	10,243	13.12	−33.43
Independent	Hardeep Singh	225	0.29	N/A
Independent	Davinder Singh Negi	219	0.28	N/A
AIFB	Lalit Taak	211	0.27	N/A
NOTA	None of the Above	641	0.82	+0.27
Majority		14,652	18.76	+10.25
Turnout		78,091	47.32	−25.04
Registered electors		1,68,026		
BJP gain from AAP		Swing	+23.69	

Delhi Assembly elections, 2015: Rajouri Garden
Party	Candidate	Votes	%	±%
AAP	Jarnail Singh	54,916	46.55	+29.85
SAD	Manjinder Singh Sirsa	44,880	38.04	−2.89
INC	Meenakshi Chandela	14,167	12.01	−18.12
SS	Gurbaksh Singh	1,706	1.45	+0.09
BSP	Moin Khan	384	0.33	−0.22
Independent	Jarnail Singh	382	0.32	
Independent	Jarnail Singh	280	0.24	
Independent	Sumit	240	0.20	
Independent	Suman Chandila	101	0.09	
Independent	Lokesh	88	0.07	
Independent	Livis Chandela	74	0.06	
Independent	Praveen Kumar	39	0.03	
Independent	Jasvindra Singh	36	0.03	
Independent	Bhagat Singh	29	0.02	
NOTA	None of the Above	649	0.55	−0.62
Majority		10,036	8.51	−2.29
Turnout		1,17,977	72.36	+3.44
Registered electors		1,63,042		
AAP gain from SAD		Swing	+28.71	

Delhi Assembly elections, 2013: Rajouri Garden
Party	Candidate	Votes	%	±%
SAD	Manjinder Singh Sirsa	41,721	40.93	
INC	Dhanwanti Chandela	30,713	30.13	−7.45
AAP	Prit Pal Singh	17,022	16.70	
NCP	Jai Prakash Lohia	5,752	5.64	−12.99
Independent	Rajender	2,468	2.42	
SS	Jasvinder Singh	1,389	1.36	
NOTA	None of the Above	1,194	1.17	
Majority		11,008	10.80	+10.75
Turnout		1,01,947	68.93	
SAD gain from INC		Swing		
