= Ved Parkash =

Indian politician

MLA, Sixth Legislative Assembly of Delhi
- In office 2015–2017
- Preceded by: Gugan Singh Ranga
- Succeeded by: Ram Chander
- Constituency: Bawana

Personal details
- Born: 22 May 1973 (age 52) Bawana
- Party: Bharatiya Janata Party
- Other political affiliations: Aam Aadmi Party
- Spouse: Sumitra Rani (wife)
- Profession: Politician, businessperson

Ved Parkash is an Indian politician and former member of the Sixth Legislative Assembly of Delhi. He is a member of the Bharatiya Janata Party. He resigned from Aam Aadmi Party and represented Bawana (Assembly constituency) of Delhi.

Born the third child of his parents he was not interested in politics in early life. He has passed 12th class from government boys' senior secondary school in 1993. He went to Kirori Mal College and dropped out in the second year.

== Early life and education ==
He completed 10th from C.B.S.E. and 12th from Haryana Board. He studied at Kurukshetra University earning Mass Communication degree.

== Political career ==
Ved Parkash has been a MLA for one term. He represented the Bawana constituency and was a member of the Aam Aadmi Party political party.

== Posts held ==
#	From	To	Position	Comments
01	2015	2017	Member, Sixth Legislative Assembly of Delhi	

== See also ==
- Aam Aadmi Party
- Bawana
- Delhi Legislative Assembly
- Politics of India
- Sixth Legislative Assembly of Delhi
