= Tilak Nagar (Delhi) =

- Neighborhood of Delhi
- Location in West Delhi, Delhi, India
- Coordinates: 28.640197°N 77.089555°E
- Country: India
- State: Delhi
- District: West Delhi

Government
  - Body: Municipal Corporation of Delhi
  - Member of Parliament: Kamaljeet Sehrawat
  - Member of Legislative Assembly: Jarnail Singh

Area
  - Total: 1.961 km^{2} (0.757 sq mi)
- Elevation: 219.6 m (720 ft)

Population (2001)
  - Total: 88,294
  - Density: 45,020/km^{2} (116,600/sq mi)

Languages
  - Official: Hindi, Punjabi, English
- Time zone: UTC+5:30 (IST)
- PIN: 110018
- Lok Sabha constituency: West Delhi
- Civic agency: SDMC

Tilak Nagar is a suburban area and commercial hub in the district of West Delhi, Delhi, India.

== Location ==
Before the Partition of India, Tilak Nagar was part of the Chaukhandi village. Tilak Nagar is situated approximately 20 km from the New Delhi Railway Station and 17 km from Delhi's Indira Gandhi International Airport. It is connected with Delhi Metro via blue line to the commercial hub of Connaught Place and to adjacent cities Ghaziabad, Gurgaon and Noida making it easy and feasible to commute on a day-to-day basis.

== Neighbourhoods ==
Tilak Nagar is surrounded by suburban localities namely Ajay Enclave, Vishnu Garden, Chand Nagar, Ashok Nagar, Fateh Nagar, Shiv Nagar, Virender Nagar, Shahpura, Sant Nagar, Choukhandi, Ganesh Nagar, Krishna Park and upscale localities namely Janakpuri and Mukherji Park. It is also surrounded by urban colonies namely Choukhandi and Khyala village.

== Government and politics ==
As of 2016, Tilak Nagar had been a BJP stronghold since 1993, when for the first time Delhi got its own Chief Minister after a period of 37 years of President's rule. The Member of Legislative Assembly (MLA) from Tilak Nagar Constituency as of 2015 was Jarnail Singh, a candidate from newly formed Aam Aadmi Party emerged victorious after defeating a BJP candidate.

== Demographics ==
Tilak Nagar's population largely consists of Pindi and Pishori Sikhs (Sikhs who migrated to India from cities of Rawalpindi and Peshawar (now in Pakistan) during the Partition of India in 1947). It also has substantial population of Jatts, Ramgharia Sikhs and Punjabi Hindus, many of whom had migrated from modern-day Pakistan during late 1940s. Most of the resident's work in commerce.

== Shops and amenities ==
The Tilak Nagar market sells products including clothing and consumer durables, such as Punjabi marriage rituals items. Other local stores include timber, hardware, and furniture stores. Three cinema halls exist in the vicinity.

== Roadways ==
Shivaji Marg is the main arterial road of West Delhi that passes through Tilak Nagar. Shaheed Bhagat Singh Marg (commonly known as Jail Road) connects it to Dhaula Kuan and other parts of south Delhi, Outer Ring Road connects it to northern localities of Delhi like Paschim Vihar, Pitampura, Rohini, NH8 and to Wazirabad.

== Health facilities ==
The area supports two hospitals among multiple medical facilities and pharmacies.
