= Dhansa (New Delhi) =

Dhansa (also known as Dhansa-Border ) is a village in Delhi, India. The village is situated in southwest Delhi, 25 km from Dwarka and around 30 km from Indira Gandhi International Airport. It comes under Najafgarh constituency.
