= Tilak Nagar Assembly constituency =

Constituency of the Delhi legislative assembly in India

Coordinates: 28.639°N 77.089°E

Tilak Nagar
- Constituency No. 29 for the Delhi Legislative Assembly

Constituency details
- Country: India
- Region: North India
- State: Delhi
- District: West Delhi
- Lok Sabha constituency: West Delhi
- Reservation: None

Member of Legislative Assembly
- 8th Delhi Legislative Assembly
- Incumbent Jarnail Singh
- Party: AAP
- Elected year: 2025

Tilak Nagar Assembly constituency is one of the 70 Delhi Legislative Assembly constituencies of the National Capital Territory in northern India.

== Overview ==
Present geographical structure of Tilak Nagar constituency came into existence in 2008 as a part of the implementation of the recommendations of the Delimitation Commission of India constituted in 2002. Tilak Nagar is part of West Delhi Lok Sabha constituency along with nine other Assembly segments, namely, Madipur, Rajouri Garden, Hari Nagar, Najafgarh, Janakpuri, Vikaspuri, Dwarka, Matiala and Uttam Nagar.

== Members of Legislative Assembly ==
Year	Member	Party
1993	O.P. Babbar	Bharatiya Janata Party
1998	Jaspal Singh	Indian National Congress
2003	O.P. Babbar	Bharatiya Janata Party
2008	O.P. Babbar	Bharatiya Janata Party
2013	Jarnail Singh	Aam Aadmi Party
2015	Jarnail Singh	Aam Aadmi Party
2020	Jarnail Singh	Aam Aadmi Party
2025	Jarnail Singh	Aam Aadmi Party

== Election results ==
=== 2025 ===
Delhi Assembly elections, 2025: Tilak Nagar
Party	Candidate	Votes	%	±%
AAP	Jarnail Singh	52,134	54.0	−8.20
BJP	Shweta Saini	40,478	41.9	+7.62
INC	PS Bawa	2,747	2.9	+1.10
NOTA	None of the above	607	0.4	−0.12
Majority		11,656	12.2	
Turnout		95,896	60.3	
AAP hold		Swing		

=== 2020 ===
Delhi Assembly elections, 2020: Tilak Nagar
Party	Candidate	Votes	%	±%
AAP	Jarnail Singh	62,436	62.20	+7.10
BJP	Rajiv Babbar	34,407	34.28	−1.65
INC	Raminder Singh	1,807	1.80	−5.24
AAAP	Jarnail Singh	527	0.52	
NOTA	None of the above	522	0.52	+0.07
Majority		28,029	28.06	+8.89
Turnout		1,00,392	63.96	−6.69
AAP hold		Swing	+7.10	

=== 2015 ===
Delhi Assembly elections, 2015: Tilak Nagar
Party	Candidate	Votes	%	±%
AAP	Jarnail Singh	57,180	55.10	+15.83
BJP	Rajiv Babbar	37,290	35.93	−0.97
INC	Duli Chand Lohia	7,303	7.04	−14.73
Independent	Jarnail Singh	570	0.55	
RABP	Rajiv Babbar	253	0.24	
BSP	Vijay Bahadur	250	0.24	−0.23
NOTA	None	464	0.45	−0.25
Majority		19,890	19.17	+16.79
Turnout		1,03,815	70.65	
AAP hold		Swing	+15.83	

=== 2013 ===
Delhi Assembly elections, 2013: Tilak Nagar
Party	Candidate	Votes	%	±%
AAP	Jarnail Singh	34,993	39.27	
BJP	Rajiv Babber	32,405	36.90	−15.43
INC	Amrita Dhawan	19,117	21.77	−14.01
BSP	Jagdish Chand	409	0.47	−3.05
Independent	Sarwan Singh	308	0.35	
ABVCP	Saurabh Singh	147	0.17	
Independent	Paramjit Singh Saini	100	0.11	
Independent	Vishal Sharma	90	0.10	
Independent	Sudhir Arora	73	0.08	
Independent	A Premraj Chandela A	71	0.08	
NOTA	None	617	0.70	
Majority		2,088	2.38	−14.17
Turnout		87,877	66.20	
AAP gain from BJP		Swing		

=== 2008 ===
Delhi Assembly elections, 2008: Tilak Nagar
Party	Candidate	Votes	%	±%
BJP	O P Babbar	38,320	52.33	+0.36
INC	Dr Anita Babbar	26,202	35.78	+7.13
Independent	Ajit Singh Chadha	4,031	5.50	
BSP	Arvinder Singh Maken	2,580	3.52	+1.27
Independent	Herry Gulati	486	0.66	
Independent	Surender Yadav	380	0.52	
Mukt Bharat	Jai Bhagwan	274	0.37	
Independent	Anita Babbar	206	0.28	
Independent	Shiv Kumar Tyagi	196	0.27	
Independent	Sudha Popli	155	0.21	
Independent	Dinesh Jain	148	0.20	
Independent	Kuldeep Singh Anand	114	0.16	
Independent	Gurvinder Kaur	79	0.11	
Independent	Deepak Gupta	61	0.08	
Majority		12,118	16.55	+7.49
Turnout		73,232	53.5	−6.95
BJP hold		Swing	+0.36	

=== 2003 ===
Delhi Assembly elections, 2003: Tilak Nagar
Party	Candidate	Votes	%	±%
BJP	O P Babbar	32,298	51.97	+5.49
INC	Jaspal Singh	26,670	42.91	−6.31
BSP	S Gurcharan Singh	1,397	2.25	+1.50
NCP	Ramesh Yadav	854	1.37	
Independent	Bharat Bhushan	289	0.46	
Independent	Vinod Kumar	249	0.40	
Independent	Bhanu Pratap Singh	182	0.29	
Independent	Jaspal Singh	146	0.23	
Independent	Brij Lal	68	0.11	
Majority		5,628	9.06	+5.32
Turnout		62,153	60.45	+9.44
BJP hold		Swing	+5.49	

=== 1998 ===
Delhi Assembly elections, 1998: Tilak Nagar
Party	Candidate	Votes	%	±%
INC	Jaspal Singh	27,240	49.22	+17.49
BJP	O P Babbar	25,724	46.48	−15.56
BSP	Mannu Devi	414	0.75	+0.02
Independent	Sudhir Bathla	385	0.70	
SP	Ranjit Singh	330	0.60	+0.51
JD	Vinod Kumar	286	0.52	−1.06
SS	Jitender Sabharwal	285	0.51	+0.36
Independent	Shanti	132	0.24	
Independent	Rajan	129	0.23	
Independent	Sohan Lal	97	0.18	
Independent	Shikha Garg	82	0.15	
Independent	Lakhmir	75	0.14	
Independent	Amrit Singh Rangila	68	0.12	
JP	Krishan Lal Bharti	56	0.40	−1.17
Independent	Sudhir Gupta	40	0.07	
Majority		1,516	2.74	+27.57
Turnout		55,343	51.01	−12.86
INC hold		Swing	+17.49	

=== 1993 ===
Delhi Assembly elections, 1993: Tilak Nagar
Party	Candidate	Votes	%	±%
BJP	O P Babbar	33,911	62.04	
INC	Tervinder Singh Marwah	17,341	31.73	
JD	Mukhtar Singh	864	1.58	
JP	Dinesh Jain	857	1.57	
BSP	Manjeet Singh	399	0.73	
Independent	Ashok Kumar Manu	199	0.36	
Independent	Shubhash Chander	125	0.23	
Independent	Navneet Singh	86	0.16	
Independent	Vir Bhan Malhotra	84	0.15	
Independent	Vinod	81	0.15	
SS	Dev Raj	81	0.15	
Independent	Rajeev	73	0.13	
Independent	Sudarshan Kumar	69	0.13	
Independent	Vijay Shastri	64	0.12	
Independent	Man Mohan Singh	58	0.11	
Independent	Vijay Kumar Jain	54	0.10	
SP	Rajesh Sharma	51	0.09	
Independent	Anjna Kohli	49	0.09	
Doordarshi Party	Subhash	36	0.07	
Independent	Amarjit Singh	34	0.06	
Independent	Bhagwan Dass	34	0.06	
Independent	Kundan Lal	33	0.06	
Independent	Jugal Kishor	31	0.06	
Independent	Arvinder	27	0.05	
Independent	Virender Abrol	15	0.03	
Majority		16,570	30.31	
Turnout		54,656	63.87	
BJP hold		Swing		

== See also ==
- Tilak Nagar
