= R. K. Puram Assembly constituency =

Constituency of the Delhi legislative assembly in India

Coordinates: 28.567°N 77.176°E

R K Puram
- Constituency No. 44 for the Delhi Legislative Assembly

Constituency details
- Country: India
- Region: North India
- Union Territory: Delhi
- District: New Delhi
- Reservation: None

Member of Legislative Assembly
- 8th Delhi Legislative Assembly
- Incumbent Anil Kumar Sharma
- Party: BJP
- Elected year: 2025

R K Puram Assembly constituency is one of the seventy Delhi assembly constituencies of Delhi in northern India. It is a part of New Delhi Lok Sabha constituency.

== Members of Legislative Assembly ==
Year	Member	Party
1993	Bodh Raj	Bharatiya Janata Party
1998	Ashok Singh	Indian National Congress
2003	Barkha Singh	Indian National Congress
2008	Barkha Singh	Indian National Congress
2013	Anil Kumar Sharma	Bharatiya Janata Party
2015	Pramila Tokas	Aam Aadmi Party
2020	Pramila Tokas	Aam Aadmi Party
2025	Anil Kumar Sharma	Bharatiya Janata Party

== Election results ==
=== 2025 ===
Delhi Assembly elections, 2025: R K Puram
Party	Candidate	Votes	%	±%
BJP	Anil Kumar Sharma	43,350	56.55	+15.63
AAP	Pramila Tokas	25,480	37.65	−14.80
INC	Vishesh Tokas	2,318	4.02	+0.42
Majority		14,453	18.90	+7.38
Turnout		76,503		
BJP gain from AAP		Swing		

=== 2020 ===
Delhi Assembly elections, 2020: R K Puram
Party	Candidate	Votes	%	±%
AAP	Pramila Tokas	48,208	52.45	−5.52
BJP	Anil Kumar Sharma	36,839	40.93	+3.19
INC	Priyanka Singh	3,237	3.60	−0.68
BSP	Nageshwar Das	301	0.33	−0.54
NOTA	None of the above	527	0.59	+0.10
Majority		10,369	11.52	−8.32
Turnout		90,023	57.02	−7.12
AAP hold		Swing	-5.52	

=== 2015 ===
Delhi Assembly elections, 2015: R K Puram
Party	Candidate	Votes	%	±%
AAP	Pramila Tokas	54,645	57.97	+25.19
BJP	Anil Kumar Sharma	35,577	37.74	+4.57
INC	Liladhar Bhatt	4,042	4.28	−19.02
BSP	Mahipal Singh	828	0.87	−8.14
NOTA	None of the above	462	0.49	−0.14
Majority		19,068	20.23	+19.84
Turnout		94,298	64.14	
AAP gain from BJP		Swing	+25.19	

=== 2013 ===
Delhi Assembly elections, 2013: R K Puram
Party	Candidate	Votes	%	±%
BJP	Anil Kumar Sharma	28,017	33.17	−6.43
AAP	Shazia Ilmi	27,691	32.78	
INC	Barkha Singh	19,679	23.30	−30.20
BSP	Dhiraj Kumar Tokas	7,614	9.01	+4.09
NOTA	None	528	0.63	
Majority		326	0.39	−12.51
Turnout		84,600	63.46	
BJP gain from INC		Swing	-6.43	

=== 2008 ===
Delhi Assembly elections, 2008: R K Puram
Party	Candidate	Votes	%	±%
INC	Barkha Singh	35,878	53.50	−0.48
BJP	Radhey Shyam Sharma	26,561	39.60	−1.04
BSP	Kulbir Singh	3,298	4.92	+1.39
Majority		9,317	13.90	−0.56
Turnout		67,066	52.7	−12.43
INC hold		Swing	-0.48	

=== 2003 ===
Delhi Assembly elections, 2003: R K Puram
Party	Candidate	Votes	%	±%
INC	Barkha Singh	22,591	53.98	+8.01
BJP	Ajit Singh	17,006	40.64	+2.20
Independent	Hiren Tokas	1,477	3.53	
Independent	Dr Inderjeet Singh Mehta	278	0.66	
Akhil Bharatiya Jan Sangh	Kapoor Singh	242	0.58	
BLCP	Sukhbir Singh	95	0.23	
Independent	Jai Ram	83	0.20	
JPJD	Sabir Ali	77	0.18	
Majority		5,585	13.34	+5.81
Turnout		41,849	40.27	+4.31
INC hold		Swing	+8.01	

=== 1998 ===
Delhi Assembly elections, 1998: R K Puram
Party	Candidate	Votes	%	±%
INC	Ashok Singh	20,509	45.97	+9.09
BJP	Bodh Raj	17,152	38.44	−2.22
Independent	Ajit Singh	4,779	10.71	
Independent	Rajendra Singh	1,141	2.56	
Independent	Dr (Major) Nishan Singh Cheema	746	1.67	
Independent	Mahesh Chandra Singh	173	0.39	
Independent	Vishnu Dev	92	0.21	
Independent	Ravinder Kumar	26	0.06	
Majority		3,357	7.53	+3.75
Turnout		44,618	35.96	−14.47
INC gain from BJP		Swing	+9.09	

=== 1993 ===
Delhi Assembly elections, 1993: R K Puram
Party	Candidate	Votes	%	±%
BJP	Bodh Raj	17,838	40.66	
INC	Usha Krishana Kumar	16,178	36.88	
JD	Shanti Swaroop	7,009	15.98	
Independent	D B Thalipyal	1,044	2.38	
Independent	Rama Kant	884	2.02	
Independent	Bhagwan Dass	609	1.39	
Independent	H S Kapoor	97	0.22	
Independent	Asjok Kumar	53	0.12	
Independent	Kuldeep Singh	35	0.08	
Independent	Ranbir Singh Khokhar	33	0.08	
SP	Satyendra S Dhaka	32	0.07	
Independent	Dharm Pal	22	0.05	
Independent	Vinod Kumar Khullar	18	0.04	
Independent	Sunder Singh	15	0.03	
Majority		1,660	3.78	
Turnout		43,867	50.43	
BJP hold		Swing		
