= Ambedkar Nagar Assembly constituency =

Legislative assembly seat in Delhi, India

Coordinates: 28.721°N 77.287°E

Ambedkar Nagar
- Constituency No. 48 for the Delhi Legislative Assembly

Constituency details
- Country: India
- Region: North India
- State: Delhi
- District: South Delhi
- Established: 1993
- Reservation: SC

Member of Legislative Assembly
- 8th Delhi Legislative Assembly
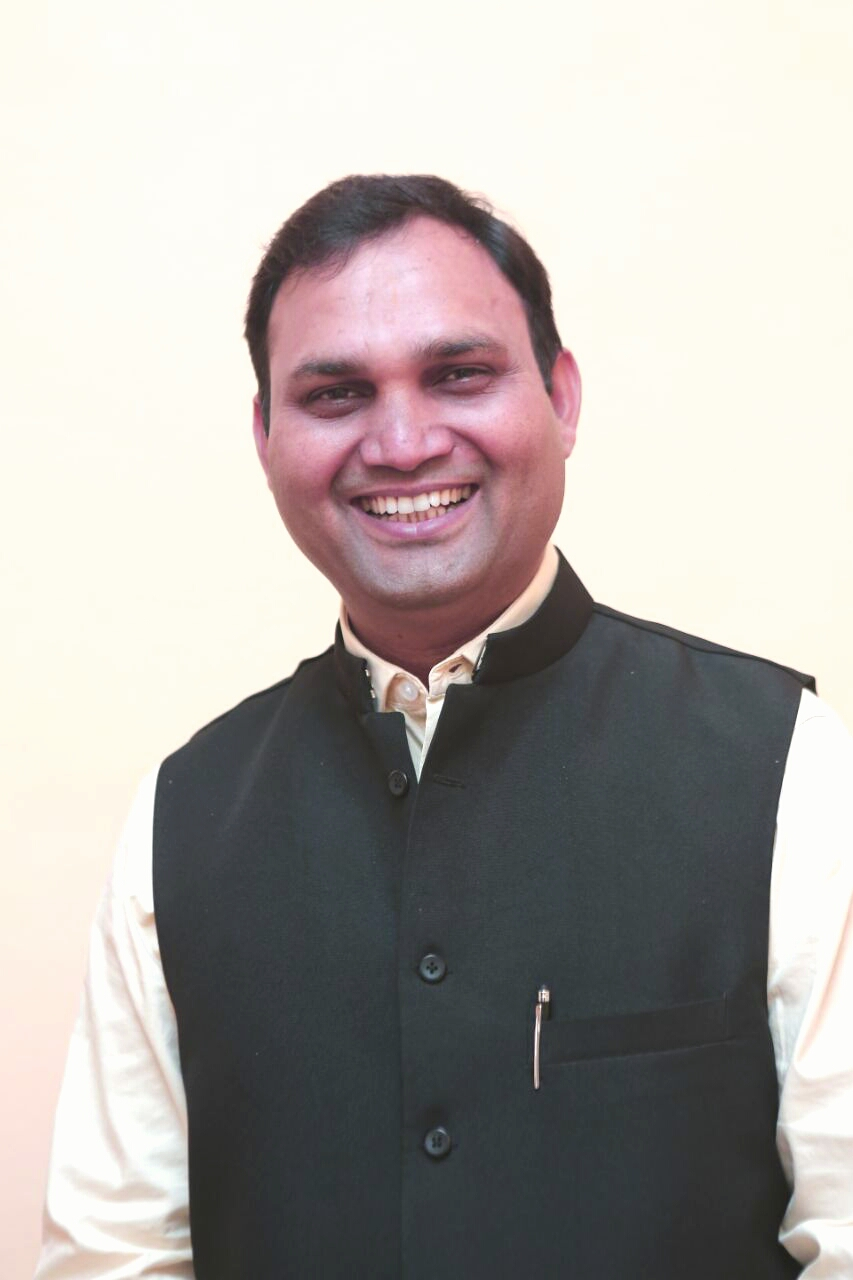
- Incumbent Ajay Dutt
- Party: AAP
- Elected year: 2025

Ambedkar Nagar is one of the 70 Delhi Legislative Assembly constituencies of the National Capital Territory in northern India.

== Overview ==
The present geographical structure of Ambedkar Nagar constituency came into existence in 2008 as a part of the implementation of the recommendations of the Delimitation Commission of India constituted in 2002. Ambedkar Nagar is part of South Delhi Lok Sabha constituency along with nine other Assembly segments, namely Bijwasan, Sangam Vihar, Chhatarpur, Deoli, Kalkaji, Tughlakabad, Palam, Badarpur and Mehrauli.

== Members of the Legislative Assembly ==
Election	Name	Party
1993	Ch. Prem Singh	Indian National Congress
1998	Ch. Prem Singh	Indian National Congress
2003	Ch. Prem Singh	Indian National Congress
2008	Ch. Prem Singh	Indian National Congress
2013	Ashok Kumar Chauhan	Aam Aadmi Party
2015	Ajay Dutt	Aam Aadmi Party
2020	Ajay Dutt	Aam Aadmi Party
2025	Ajay Dutt	Aam Aadmi Party

== Election results ==
=== 2025 ===
Delhi Assembly elections, 2025: Ambedkar Nagar
Party	Candidate	Votes	%	±%
AAP	Ajay Dutt	46,285		
BJP	Khushi Ram Chunar	42,055		
INC	Jay Prakash	7,172		
BSP	Seva Das	397		
NOTA	None of the above	498		
Majority		4,230		
Turnout		97,189		
		Swing		

=== 2020 ===
Delhi Assembly elections, 2020: Ambedkar Nagar
Party	Candidate	Votes	%	±%
AAP	Ajay Dutt	62,871	62.25	−6.13
BJP	Khushi Ram Chunar	34,544	34.20	+9.40
INC	Yaduraj Choudhary	2,138	2.12	−3.35
BSP	Satish	620	0.61	−0.22
NOTA	None of the above	496	0.49	−
Majority		28,327	28.05	−15.52
Turnout		1,01,079	64.29	−5.51
AAP hold		Swing	-6.13	

=== 2015 ===
Delhi Assembly elections, 2015: Ambedkar Nagar
Party	Candidate	Votes	%	±%
AAP	Ajay Dutt	66,632	68.38	+25.96
BJP	Ashok Kumar Chauhan	24,172	24.80	−3.96
INC	Ch. Prem Singh	5,336	5.47	−17.65
BSP	Rajbir	815	0.83	−2.97
NOTA	None of the above	481	0.49	−0.17
Majority		42,460	43.57	+29.91
Turnout		97,491	69.80	
Registered electors		1,39,676		
AAP hold		Swing	+25.96	

=== 2013 ===
Delhi Assembly elections, 2013: Ambedkar Nagar
Party	Candidate	Votes	%	±%
AAP	Ashok Kumar Chauhan	36,239	42.42	
BJP	Khushi Ram Chunar	24,569	28.76	−7.58
INC	Ch Prem Singh	19,753	23.12	−20.07
BSP	Ghan Shyam Dass	3,250	3.80	−13.73
Independent	Radhey Shyam	330	0.39	
JKNPP	Gopal Krishan	238	0.28	
Independent	Rajveer Singh	190	0.22	
BBP	Ramesh Chander Chhazlaan	188	0.22	
IJP	Raj Kumar Banewal	104	0.12	
NOTA	None	568	0.66	
Majority		11,670	13.66	+6.81
Turnout		85,526	68.68	
AAP gain from INC		Swing		

=== 2008 results ===
Delhi Assembly elections, 2008: Ambedkar Nagar
Party	Candidate	Votes	%	±%
INC	Ch Prem Singh	30,467	43.19	−9.96
BJP	Suresh Chand	25,630	36.34	+0.36
BSP	Prahlad Kumar Malviya	12,362	17.53	+9.97
LJP	Dalip Valmiki	1,264	1.79	
Independent	Trilok	515	0.73	
RJSP	Praveen Parcha	300	0.43	
Majority		4,837	6.85	−10.32
Turnout		70,538	57.4	+3.33
INC hold		Swing	-9.96	

=== 2003 ===
Delhi Assembly elections, 2003: Ambedkar Nagar
Party	Candidate	Votes	%	±%
INC	Ch Prem Singh	25,880	53.15	+0.22
BJP	Suresh Chand	17,519	35.98	+17.50
BSP	Kailash	3,679	7.56	+1.19
SS	Siya Ram	587	1.21	
IJP	Narender Malawaliya	463	0.95	
DMVP	Ramesh	305	0.63	
BLCP	Naresh	262	0.54	
Majority		8,361	17.17	−17.28
Turnout		48,695	54.07	+1.56
INC hold		Swing	+0.22	

=== 1998 ===
Delhi Assembly elections, 1998: Ambedkar Nagar
Party	Candidate	Votes	%	±%
INC	Ch Prem Singh	27,670	52.93	+9.08
BJP	Jagdish Bharti	9,662	18.48	−6.23
CPI(M)	Rajbir	3,614	6.91	−1.67
BSP	Seva Das	3,330	6.37	+4.49
Independent	Rajesh Chauhan	2,185	4.18	
JD	Dalip Kumar	2,031	3.89	−9.07
Independent	Ram Ji Lal	1,914	3.66	
Independent	Harish Chander Rajora	1,486	2.84	
Independent	Sanjiv Kumar	278	0.53	
Independent	Shiv Raj Singh	58	0.11	
Independent	Mam Chand	45	0.09	
Majority		18,008	34.45	+15.31
Turnout		52,273	52.51	−8.62
INC hold		Swing	+9.08	

=== 1993 ===
Delhi Assembly elections, 1993: Ambedkar Nagar
Party	Candidate	Votes	%	±%
INC	Prem Singh	19,621	43.85	
BJP	Rajender Kumar Sonker	11,056	24.71	
JD	Sat Pal	5,801	12.96	
CPI(M)	Rajbir	3,841	8.58	
Independent	Ram Narayan	1,684	3.76	
BSP	Rajpal Singh	839	1.88	
SS	Subhash Kumar	388	0.87	
Independent	Raj Pal	260	0.58	
RPI	Dharam Singh	227	0.51	
Independent	Raj Singh	189	0.42	
Independent	Kishan Chand Meena	152	0.34	
AIFB	Ram Nath	126	0.28	
Independent	Ramesh Karotia	126	0.28	
IDSP	Ram Phal	120	0.27	
Independent	Suraj Bhan	117	0.26	
Independent	Jagdish Singh Nagar	89	0.20	
BLMD	Mukesh Kumar	57	0.13	
Doordarshi Party	Timasi Prasad	52	0.12	
Majority		8,565	19.14	
Turnout		44,745	61.13	
INC hold		Swing		

== See also ==
- First Legislative Assembly of Delhi
- Second Legislative Assembly of Delhi
- Third Legislative Assembly of Delhi
- Fourth Legislative Assembly of Delhi
- Fifth Legislative Assembly of Delhi
- Sixth Legislative Assembly of Delhi
