= Rajouri Garden Assembly constituency =

Constituency of the Delhi legislative assembly in India

Coordinates: 28.645°N 77.121°E

Rajouri Garden
- Constituency No. 27 for the Delhi Legislative Assembly

Constituency details
- Country: India
- Region: North India
- State: Delhi
- District: New Delhi
- Established: 1993
- Reservation: None

Member of Legislative Assembly
- 8th Delhi Legislative Assembly
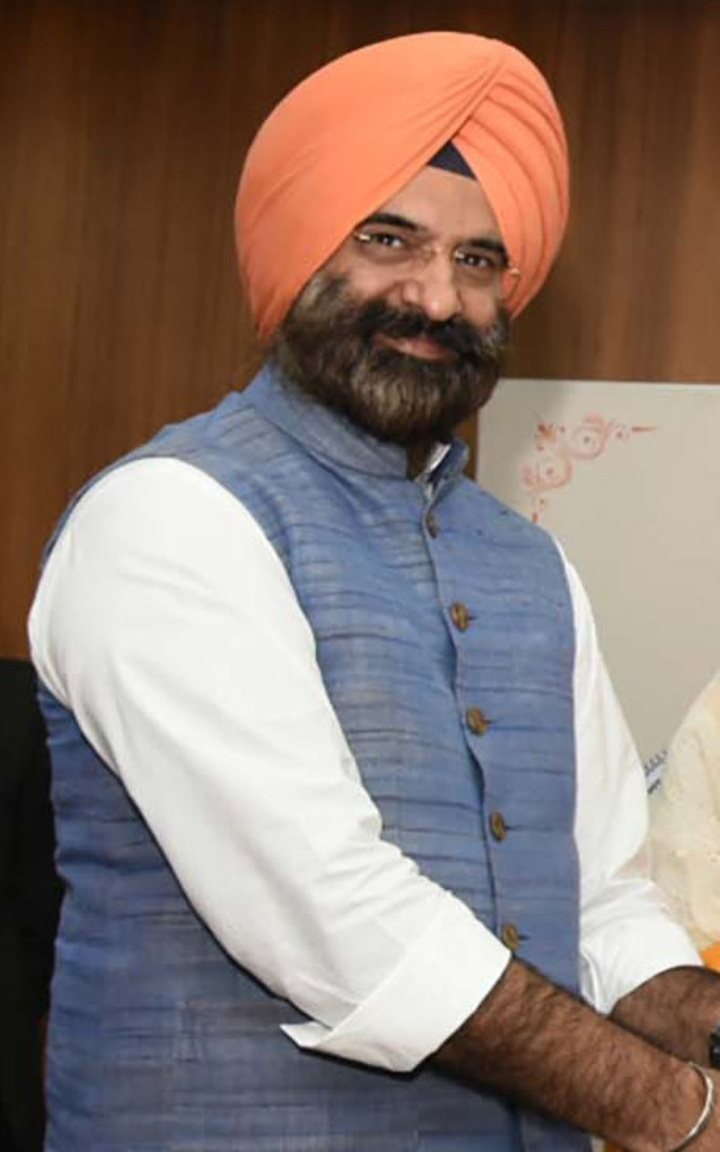
- Incumbent Manjinder Singh Sirsa
- Party: Bharatiya Janata Party
- Elected year: 2025

Rajouri Garden Assembly constituency is one of the 70 Delhi Legislative Assembly constituencies of the National Capital Territory in India.

== Overview ==
The current Rajouri Garden constituency came into existence in 2008 as a part of the implementation of the recommendations of the Delimitation Commission of India constituted in 2002. Rajouri Garden is part of West Delhi Lok Sabha constituency along with nine other Assembly segments, namely, Madipur, Tilak Nagar, Hari Nagar, Najafgarh, Janakpuri, Vikaspuri, Dwarka, Matiala and Uttam Nagar.

== Members of Legislative Assembly ==
Year	Member	Party
1993	Ajay Maken	Indian National Congress
1998	Ajay Maken	Indian National Congress
2003	Ajay Maken	Indian National Congress
2004^	Ramesh Lamba	Indian National Congress
2008	Dayanand Chandila	Indian National Congress
2013	Manjinder Singh Sirsa	Shiromani Akali Dal
2015	Jarnail Singh	Aam Aadmi Party
2017^	Manjinder Singh Sirsa	Bharatiya Janata Party
2020	Dhanwati Chandela	Aam Aadmi Party
2025	Manjinder Singh Sirsa	Bharatiya Janata Party

== Election results ==
=== 2025 ===
Delhi Assembly elections, 2025: Rajouri Garden
Party	Candidate	Votes	%	±%
BJP	Manjinder Singh Sirsa	64,132	55.86	▲20.73
AAP	Dhanwati Chandela	45,942	40.04	▼15.66
INC	Dharampal Chandela	3,198	2.79	▼0.25
NOTA	None of the above	783	0.68	
Majority		18,190	15.84	▼4.73
Turnout		114,806	63.3	▲1.29
BJP gain from AAP		Swing		

=== 2020 ===
Delhi Assembly elections, 2020: Rajouri Garden
Party	Candidate	Votes	%	±%
AAP	Dhanwati Chandela	62,212	55.70	+42.58
BJP	Ramesh Khanna	39,240	35.13	−16.86
Independent	Sukhpal Singh	5,218	4.67	New
INC	Amandeep Singh Sudan	3,398	3.04	−30.19
NOTA	None of the Above	694	0.62	−0.20
Majority		22,972	20.57	+1.81
Turnout		1,11,771	62.01	−10.35
AAP gain from BJP		Swing	+42.58	

=== 2017 results ===
By-election, 2017: Rajouri Garden
Party	Candidate	Votes	%	±%
BJP	Manjinder Singh Sirsa	40,602	51.99	+13.95
INC	Meenakshi Chandela	25,950	33.23	+21.23
AAP	Harjeet Singh	10,243	13.12	−33.43
Independent	Hardeep Singh	225	0.29	N/A
Independent	Davinder Singh Negi	219	0.28	N/A
AIFB	Lalit Taak	211	0.27	N/A
NOTA	None of the Above	641	0.82	+0.27
Majority		14,652	18.76	+10.25
Turnout		78,091	47.32	−25.04
Registered electors		1,68,026		
BJP gain from AAP		Swing	+23.69	

=== 2015 ===
Delhi Assembly elections, 2015: Rajouri Garden
Party	Candidate	Votes	%	±%
AAP	Jarnail Singh	54,916	46.55	+29.85
SAD	Manjinder Singh Sirsa	44,880	38.04	−2.89
INC	Meenakshi Chandela	14,167	12.01	−18.12
SS	Gurbaksh Singh	1,706	1.45	+0.09
BSP	Moin Khan	384	0.33	−0.22
Independent	Jarnail Singh	382	0.32	
Independent	Jarnail Singh	280	0.24	
Independent	Sumit	240	0.20	
Independent	Suman Chandila	101	0.09	
Independent	Lokesh	88	0.07	
Independent	Livis Chandela	74	0.06	
Independent	Praveen Kumar	39	0.03	
Independent	Jasvindra Singh	36	0.03	
Independent	Bhagat Singh	29	0.02	
NOTA	None of the Above	649	0.55	−0.62
Majority		10,036	8.51	−2.29
Turnout		1,17,977	72.36	+3.44
Registered electors		1,63,042		
AAP gain from SAD		Swing	+28.71	

=== 2013 ===
Delhi Assembly elections, 2013: Rajouri Garden
Party	Candidate	Votes	%	±%
SAD	Manjinder Singh Sirsa	41,721	40.93	
INC	Dhanwanti Chandela	30,713	30.13	−7.45
AAP	Prit Pal Singh	17,022	16.70	
NCP	Jai Prakash Lohia	5,752	5.64	−12.99
Independent	Rajender	2,468	2.42	
SS	Jasvinder Singh	1,389	1.36	
NOTA	None of the Above	1,194	1.17	
Majority		11,008	10.80	+10.75
Turnout		1,01,947	68.93	
SAD gain from INC		Swing		

=== Elections in the 2000s ===
Delhi Assembly elections, 2008: Rajouri Garden
Party	Candidate	Votes	%	±%
INC	Dyanand Chandila	31,130	37.58	−12.37
SAD(M)	Avtar Singh Hit	31,084	37.53	
NCP	Duli Chand	15,434	18.63	
BSP	Shamsher Singh Mehendi	1,563	1.89	−5.34
Independent	Vinod Sharma	1,469	1.77	
Independent	Balbir Singh Bir	240	0.29	
Independent	Nawab Singh	227	0.27	
RAM	Bahar Miya	220	0.27	+0.10
Independent	Rajindar Kumar	205	0.25	
Independent	Sarabjeet Singh	203	0.25	
BPC	Amarjeet Kaur	169	0.20	
Independent	Amit Chandela	124	0.15	
Independent	Daljeet Singh	115	0.14	
Independent	Kuldeep Singh Anand	107	0.13	
HRS	Bhagwan Dass	98	0.12	
Independent	Avtar Singh Diwan	86	0.10	
Independent	Jai Prakash Dhiman	80	0.10	
Independent	Jai Prakash Lohia	69	0.08	
Independent	Gajendra Yadav	61	0.07	
Independent	Om Prakash	54	0.07	
Independent	Vijender	50	0.06	
Independent	Rasid Khan	45	0.05	
Majority		54	0.05	−9.44
Turnout		82,833	62.0	+24.05
INC hold		Swing	-12.37	

Delhi Legislative Assembly By-election, 2004: Rajouri Garden
Party	Candidate	Votes	%	±%
INC	Ramesh Lamba	19,193	49.95	−19.08
BJP	Ramesh Khanna	15,544	40.46	+14.21
BSP	Virender Kumar	2,776	7.23	
IJP	Jatinder Singh	320	0.83	+0.53
Independent	Sandeep	141	0.37	
INLP	Chandra Singh Mehrat	130	0.34	−0.06
Independent	Lalit Babu	99	0.26	
RAM	Gopi Chand	66	0.17	
Independent	Gurunam Singh	66	0.17	
Independent	Ravi Kumar	66	0.17	
Independent	Ashwani Kumar Khanna	21	0.05	
Majority		3,649	9.49	−33.29
Turnout		38,422	37.95	−19.96
INC hold		Swing	-19.08	

Delhi Assembly elections, 2003: Rajouri Garden
Party	Candidate	Votes	%	±%
INC	Ajay Maken	39,515	69.03	+3.30
BJP	Sarabjit Singh	15,028	26.25	−4.30
RSP(U)	Sarup Singh Tur	656	1.15	
Independent	Moti Lal Bairwa	605	1.06	
SS	Subhash Chander	428	0.75	
INLP	Chandra Singh Mehrat	231	0.40	
Independent	Ved Prakash	224	0.39	
AB	Dr Rajesh Kumar Bhatia	182	0.32	
IJP	Kamal Kumar Khanna	171	0.30	
Independent	Teck Chand Malhotra Alias Titoo	153	0.27	
Independent	Arun Vij	49	0.09	
Majority		24,487	42.78	+17.60
Turnout		57,242	57.91	+7.29
INC hold		Swing	+3.30	

=== Elections in the 1990s ===
Delhi Assembly elections, 1998: Rajouri Garden
Party	Candidate	Votes	%	±%
INC	Ajay Maken	36,060	65.73	+14.78
BJP	Shashi Prabha Arya	16,763	30.55	−13.96
BSP	Shakuntla	1,094	1.99	
Independent	Subhash Bairwa	367	0.67	
Independent	Jagdish Prasad Nainawat	233	0.42	
Independent	Sahib Singh	187	0.34	
RAM	Gopi Chand Tyagi	70	0.13	
Independent	Neeraj Malik	56	0.10	
Independent	Tara Chand	32	0.06	+0.03
Majority		19,297	25.18	+18.74
Turnout		54,862	50.62	−15.63
INC hold		Swing	+14.78	

Delhi Assembly elections, 1993: Rajouri Garden
Party	Candidate	Votes	%	±%
INC	Ajay Maken	28,075	50.95	
BJP	Manohar Lal Kumar	24,524	44.51	
JD	Jai Prakash Tyagi	1,454	2.64	
Independent	Gurcharan Singh	203	0.37	
Independent	Narinder	144	0.26	
Independent	Brij Lal	117	0.21	
Independent	Satender	99	0.18	
Independent	Manmohan	96	0.17	
Independent	Kanihiya Lal	74	0.13	
Independent	Anokha Singh	73	0.13	
Independent	Kherati Lal	58	0.11	
Independent	Shankar Lal Maurya	39	0.07	
Independent	Rattan Singh Virk	34	0.06	
Independent	S N Gupta	34	0.06	
Independent	Hari Parshad	24	0.04	
Independent	Darshan Singh	19	0.03	
Independent	Sham Sunder	19	0.03	
Independent	Tara Chand	14	0.03	
Majority		3,551	6.44	
Turnout		55,100	66.25	
INC win (new seat)				

== See also ==
- Rajouri Garden
