= Bawana Assembly constituency =

Legislative assembly seat in Delhi

Coordinates: 28.797°N 77.047°E

Bawana
- Constituency No. 7 for the Delhi Legislative Assembly

Constituency details
- Country: India
- Region: North India
- State: Delhi
- District: North West Delhi
- Established: 1993
- Reservation: SC

Member of Legislative Assembly
- 8th Delhi Legislative Assembly
- Incumbent Ravinder Indraj Singh
- Party: Bharatiya Janata Party
- Elected year: 2025

Bawana (SC) is one of the seventy Delhi Legislative Assembly constituencies of Delhi in northern India. The Bawana constituency is a part of North West Delhi Lok Sabha constituency.

== Members of the Legislative Assembly ==
Year	Name	Party
1993	Chand Ram	Bharatiya Janata Party
1998	Surender Kumar	Indian National Congress
2003	Surender Kumar	Indian National Congress
2008	Surender Kumar	Indian National Congress
2013	Gugan Singh	Bharatiya Janata Party
2015	Ved Parkash	Aam Aadmi Party
2017^	Ram Chander	Aam Aadmi Party
2020	Jai Bhagwan	Aam Aadmi Party
2025	Ravinder Indraj Singh	Bharatiya Janata Party

== Election results ==
=== 2025 ===
2025 Delhi Legislative Assembly elections:Bawana
Party	Candidate	Votes	%	±%
BJP	Ravinder Indraj Singh	119,515	51.99	▲9.44
AAP	Jai Bhagwan	88,040	38.30	▼10.08
INC	Surender Kumar	18,713	8.14	▲1.67
NOTA	None of the above	1,346	0.59	
Majority		31,475	13.69	▲7.86
Turnout		2,28,510	59.7	▼2.27
BJP gain from AAP		Swing		

=== 2020 ===
2020 Delhi Legislative Assembly elections: Bawana
Party	Candidate	Votes	%	±%
AAP	Jai Bhagwan	95,715	48.38	–9.76
BJP	Ravinder Kumar	84,189	42.55	+11.39
INC	Surender Kumar	12,803	6.47	–1.40
BSP	Ranjit Ram	1,941	0.98	–0.96
CPI	Abhipsa Chauhan	1,227	0.62	N/A
NOTA	None of the above	1,046	0.53	+0.07
Majority		11,526	5.83	–21.15
Turnout		1,98,040	61.97	+0.16
AAP hold		Swing	–9.76	

=== 2017 By Poll results ===
By-election, 2017: Bawana
Party	Candidate	Votes	%	±%
AAP	Ram Chander (politician)	59,886	45.39	–12.75
BJP	Ved Parkash	35,834	27.16	–4.00
INC	Surender Kumar	31,919	24.19	+16.32
NOTA	None of the Above	1,413	000	+0.61
Majority		24,052	18.23	–8.75
Turnout		1,31,950	44.79	–17.02
AAP hold		Swing	–12.75	

=== 2015 ===
Delhi Assembly elections, 2015: Bawana
Party	Candidate	Votes	%	±%
AAP	Ved Parkash	1,08,928	58.14	
BJP	Gugan Singh	58,371	31.16	
INC	Surender Kumar	14,749	7.87	
BSP	Gajanand	3,641	1.94	
NOTA	None of the above	866	0.46	
Majority		50,557	26.98	
Turnout		1,87,416	61.83	
AAP gain from BJP		Swing		

=== 2013 ===
Delhi Assembly elections, 2013: Bawana
Party	Candidate	Votes	%	±%
BJP	Gugan Singh	68,407	41.10	+6.45
AAP	Manoj Singh	42,768	25.69	
INC	Surender Kumar	42,054	25.26	–23.07
BSP	Manak Chand	9,017	5.42	–8.83
Independent	Sher Singh	634	0.38	
NCP	Kavita	616	0.37	
BJD(I)	Amod Paswan	489	0.29	
Independent	Pawan Kumar	336	0.20	
IJP	Vimal Verma	330	0.20	
SS	Rajesh	308	0.19	
BPC	Dharam Raj	279	0.17	
NOTA	None	1,217	0.73	
Majority		25,639	15.40	+1.74
Turnout		166,797	61.14	
BJP gain from INC		Swing	+6.45	

=== 2008 ===
Delhi Assembly elections, 2008: Bawana
Party	Candidate	Votes	%	±%
INC	Surender Kumar	60,544	48.33	–2.48
BJP	Chand Ram	43,402	34.65	–1.50
BSP	Ramchander	17,848	14.25	+8.78
LJP	Phool Kumar	1,597	1.27	
Independent	Harbir Singh	1,363	1.09	
BPC	Rekha Devi	516	0.41	
Majority		17,142	13.66	–1.00
Turnout		125,270	52.6	–0.37
INC hold		Swing	–2.48	

=== 2003 ===
Delhi Assembly elections, 2003: Bawana
Party	Candidate	Votes	%	±%
INC	Surender Kumar	50,327	50.81	–8.37
BJP	Raj Kumar	35,805	36.15	
BSP	Sanjay Kumar	5,423	5.47	+2.11
Independent	Neelam Kinner	1,851	1.87	
Independent	Ved Prakash	1,703	1.72	
INLD	Hem Chander	1,348	1.36	
Independent	Satpal Bharti	1,294	1.31	
Independent	Sudha Devi	605	0.61	
AIFB	Chan Kaur	532	0.54	
Independent	Phool Kumar	163	0.16	
Majority		14,522	14.66	–23.13
Turnout		99,051	52.97	+9.16
INC hold		Swing	–8.37	

=== 1998 ===
Delhi Assembly elections, 1998: Bawana
Party	Candidate	Votes	%	±%
INC	Surender Kumar	40,241	59.18	+30.47
Independent	Om Prakash Ranga	14,543	21.39	
INLD	Hem Chander	8,588	12.63	
BSP	Ram Palat Gautam	2,282	3.36	+1.90
Independent	Talewar	980	1.44	
ABJC	Ram Milan	578	0.85	
SP	Naresh Kumar	413	0.61	
SS	Rani Lajwanti	192	0.28	
MSP	Banwari Lal	185	0.27	
Majority		25,698	37.79	+33.55
Turnout		68,002	43.81	–14.23
INC gain from BJP		Swing	+30.47	

=== 1993 ===
Delhi Assembly elections, 1993: Bawana
Party	Candidate	Votes	%	±%
BJP	Chand Ram	18,383	35.48	
JD	Rajender Singh	16,188	31.24	
INC	Om Prakash Ranga	14,876	28.71	
Independent	Udai Singh Kataria	1,059	2.04	
BSP	R P Gautam	754	1.46	
DPP	Roshan Lal Khondia	385	0.74	
Independent	Krishan	126	0.24	
Independent	Tulsi Ram Lukar	44	0.08	
Majority		2,195	4.24	
Turnout		51,815	58.04	
BJP hold		Swing		

== See also ==
- First Legislative Assembly of Delhi
- Second Legislative Assembly of Delhi
- Third Legislative Assembly of Delhi
- Fourth Legislative Assembly of Delhi
- Fifth Legislative Assembly of Delhi
- Sixth Legislative Assembly of Delhi
