= 2025 Delhi Legislative Assembly election =

- 5 February 2025

All 70 seats in the Delhi Legislative Assembly 36 seats needed for a majority
- Turnout: 60.54% (▼2.28 pp)
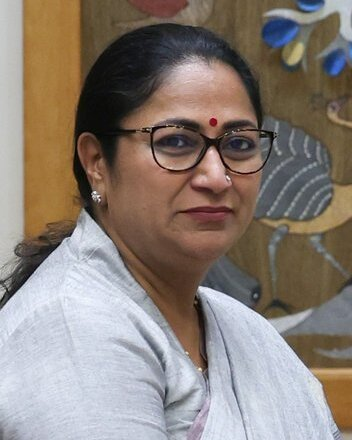

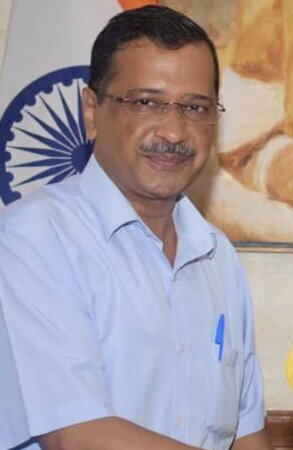
	First party	Second party
Leader	Rekha Gupta (Note: BJP did not name any chief ministerial candidate for the election. Gupta's name was announced as chief minister after the elections.)	Arvind Kejriwal
Party	BJP	AAP
Alliance	NDA
Leader's seat	Shalimar Bagh (won)	New Delhi (lost)
Last election	38.51%, 8 seats	53.57%, 62 seats
Seats won	48	22
Seat change	▲40	▼40
Popular vote	4,473,899	4,133,898
Percentage	47.15%	43.57%
Swing	▲8.64pp	▼10.00 pp
- Seatwise result map of the election

- Structure of the Delhi Legislative Assembly after the election

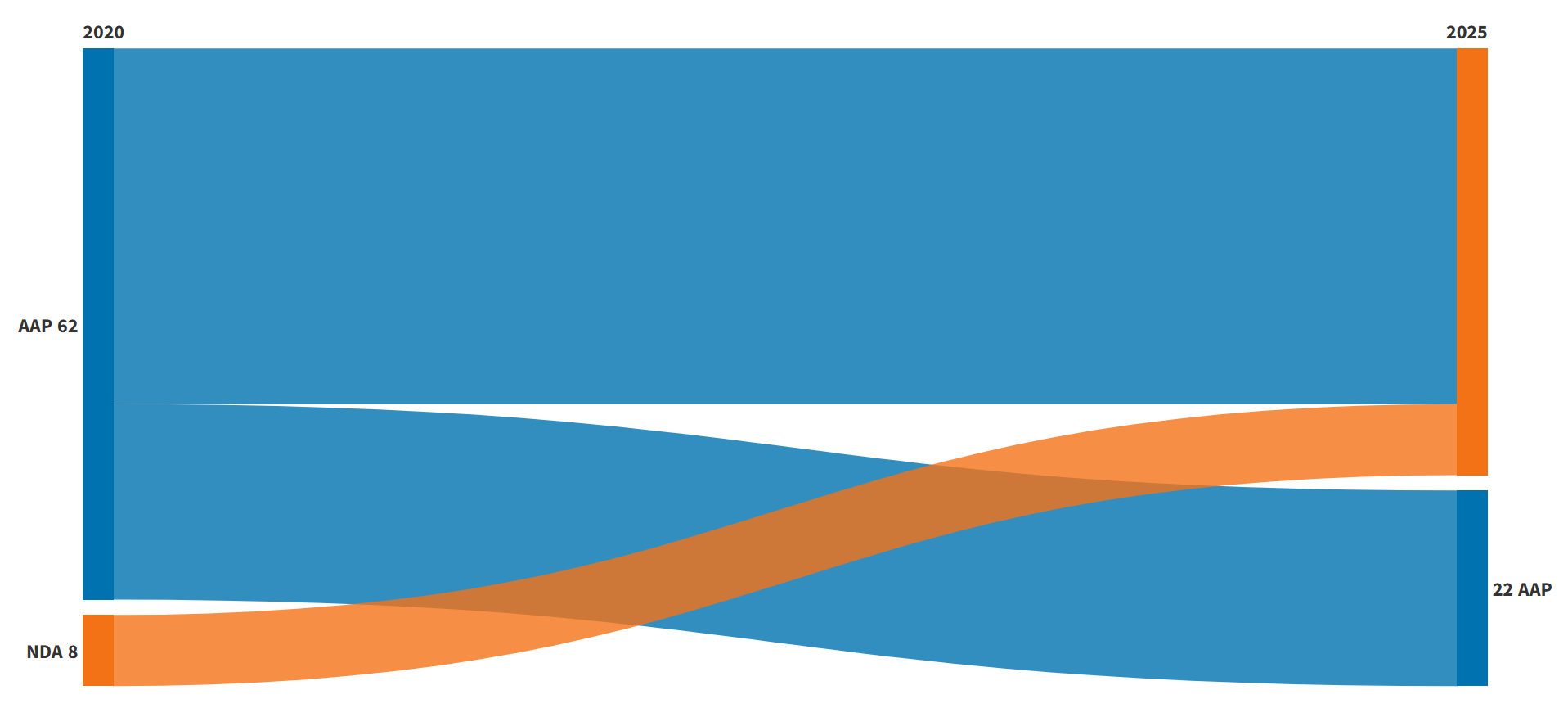
- Sankey Diagram of 2025 elections in comparision to 2020 elections
Chief Minister before election
Atishi Marlena
AAP
Elected Chief Minister
Rekha Gupta
BJP

Legislative Assembly elections were held in Delhi on 5 February 2025 to elect all 70 members of the Delhi Legislative Assembly. The counting of votes and declaration of results took place on 8 February 2025.

The Bharatiya Janata Party won in 48 out of 70 seats, thus returning to power in Delhi after 27 years. Rekha Gupta, the MLA from Shalimar Bagh, took oath as the Chief Minister on 20 February 2025.

== Background ==
The previous Delhi Legislative Assembly elections were held in February 2020, resulting in the Aam Aadmi Party (AAP) forming the state government. Arvind Kejriwal assumed the post of Chief Minister for a third consecutive term.

=== Arrest of Arvind Kejriwal ===
After skipping nine summons from the Enforcement Directorate (ED), Delhi Chief Minister Arvind Kejriwal was arrested on 21 March 2024 by the ED after the Delhi High Court rejected his anticipatory bail in connection with the Delhi liquor policy money laundering case. This made him the first sitting chief minister of India to be arrested (all others arrested before him had resigned from their post before being arrested). The opposition alliance called it a fabricated case and "match-fixing" before the 2024 general elections by the Bharatiya Janata Party led union government. The Delhi High Court dismissed Kejriwal's petition against his arrest and all his bail requests. The Supreme Court ultimately granted him interim bail from 10 May 2024 to 1 June 2024 on account of campaigning for the elections.

Following the end of his interim bail and failure to extend it on medical grounds, Kejriwal surrendered at Tihar Jail on 2 June. He was then sent to judicial custody until 5 June 2024. A Delhi court denied the plea filed by Kejriwal seeking a seven-day interim bail and extended judicial custody until 19 June and subsequently till 3 July 2024. On 20 June 2024 Kejriwal was granted bail by the trial court on a bail bond of 100,000 INR. However, his bail was put on hold before his release as ED appealed against it in the Delhi High Court. Kejriwal was then questioned for 3 days by the Central Bureau of Investigation (CBI) and arrested on 26 June 2024 from Tihar Jail in the same case. Subsequently, he was sent to judicial custody till 12 July.

On 12 July 2024, the Supreme Court granted interim bail to Kejriwal in money laundering case related to the alleged excise policy scam. However, he remained in jail due to the CBI arrest made in the previous month. On 5 September 2024, the Supreme court reserved an order on his bail in the CBI case. The reserved order was pronounced by the SC on 13 September 2024, granting him bail and ultimately leading to his release from Tihar Jail after five months. However he served in prison for more than 5 months.

On 21 September 2024, Kejriwal resigned after being jailed on corruption charges, and Atishi Marlena was sworn in as the Chief Minister. The tenure of the 7th Delhi Assembly is set to conclude on 15 February 2025. Deputy Chief Minister of Delhi Manish Sisodia had previously resigned on 28 February 2023 due to his arrest on corruption charges. He served 17 months in jail until his release on bail on 9 August 2024. Minister Satyendra Kumar Jain also resigned due to corruption charges.

== Schedule ==
Election Commission of India announced the schedule for the Delhi Legislative Assembly election on 7 January 2025.

Poll event	Schedule
Notification date	10 January 2025
Last date for filing nomination	17 January 2025
Scrutiny of nomination	18 January 2025
Last date for withdrawal of nomination	20 January 2025
Date of poll	5 February 2025
Date of counting of votes	8 February 2025
Date before which election shall be completed	10 February 2025

== Issues ==
=== Local Governance & Infrastructure Issues ===
Voters in Delhi expressed deep frustration over the failure to clean the Yamuna River a promise made by the AAP government in 2020 that remained unfulfilled. The sanitation and waste management crisis further fueled discontent, with over 90% of respondents in the Lokniti-CSDS Survey expressing dissatisfaction with the overall cleanliness of the city. Additionally, air pollution and the shortage of clean drinking water emerged as major concerns, with more than 80% of voters highlighting these as pressing issues. These factors collectively contributed to the electorate's growing disillusionment with the AAP government's performance on environmental and civic infrastructure matters.

=== Corruption Allegations & Leadership Credibility ===
According to the Lokniti-CSDS Survey, nearly two-thirds of respondents perceived the AAP government as corrupt, with 28% categorizing it as highly corrupt. Two specific controversies played a significant role in shaping public perception regarding corruption within the Aam Aadmi Party (AAP) government. The first was the alleged irregularities in the liquor policy, while the second centered on the controversial expenditures on the Chief Minister's residence, which the BJP referred to as 'Sheesh Mahal'. Both issues were prominently highlighted in the BJP's anti-corruption campaign against AAP, contributing to the party's declining credibility and electoral setbacks. Additionally, several key AAP leaders suffered electoral defeats, reflecting growing public disillusionment with the party's governance and its ability to deliver on its promises.

== Parties and alliances ==
Party/Alliance		Flag	Symbol	Leader	Seats contested
Aam Aadmi Party				Arvind Kejriwal	70
NDA	Bharatiya Janata Party			Rekha Gupta	68
NDA	Janata Dal (United)			Shailendra Kumar	1
NDA	Lok Janshakti Party (Ram Vilas)			Deepak Tanwar	1
Indian National Congress				Devender Yadav	70
Bahujan Samaj Party					68
Nationalist Congress Party					17
Aazad Samaj Party (Kanshi Ram)					14
All India Majlis-e-Ittehadul Muslimeen				Shoaib Jamei	2

== Candidates ==
District	Constituency		AAP		NDA		INC	
North Delhi	1	Narela	AAP	Sharad Chauhan	BJP	Raj Karan Khatri	INC	Aruna Kumari
Central Delhi	2	Burari	AAP	Sanjeev Jha	JD(U)	Shailendra Kumar	INC	Mangesh Tyagi
Central Delhi	3	Timarpur	AAP	Surinder Pal Singh (Bittoo)	BJP	Surya Prakash Khatri	INC	Lokendra Chaudhary
North Delhi	4	Adarsh Nagar	AAP	Mukesh Goel	BJP	Raj Kumar Bhatia	INC	Shivank Singhal
North Delhi	5	Badli	AAP	Ajesh Yadav	BJP	Deepak Chaudhary	INC	Devender Yadav
North West Delhi	6	Rithala	AAP	Mohinder Goyal	BJP	Kulwant Rana	INC	Sushant Mishra
North Delhi	7	Bawana (SC)	AAP	Jai Bhagwan	BJP	Ravinder Indraj Singh	INC	Surender Kumar
North West Delhi	8	Mundka	AAP	Jasbir Karala	BJP	Gajender Drall	INC	Dharam Pal Lakda
North West Delhi	9	Kirari	AAP	Anil Jha Vats	BJP	Bajrang Shukla	INC	Rajesh Gupta
North West Delhi	10	Sultanpur Majra (SC)	AAP	Mukesh Kumar Ahlawat	BJP	Karam Singh Karma	INC	Jai Kishan
West Delhi	11	Nangloi Jat	AAP	Raghuvinder Shokeen	BJP	Manoj Kumar Shokeen	INC	Rohit Chaudhary
North West Delhi	12	Mangolpuri (SC)	AAP	Rakesh Jatav	BJP	Raj Kumar Chauhan	INC	Hanuman Chauhan
North Delhi	13	Rohini	AAP	Pradeep Mittal	BJP	Vijender Gupta	INC	Sumesh Gupta
North West Delhi	14	Shalimar Bagh	AAP	Bandana Kumari	BJP	Rekha Gupta	INC	Praveen Jain
North Delhi	15	Shakur Basti	AAP	Satyendra Kumar Jain	BJP	Karnail Singh	INC	Satish Luthra
North West Delhi	16	Tri Nagar	AAP	Preeti Tomar	BJP	Tilak Ram Gupta	INC	Satendra Sharma
North Delhi	17	Wazirpur	AAP	Rajesh Gupta	BJP	Poonam Sharma	INC	Ragini Nayak
North Delhi	18	Model Town	AAP	Akhilesh Pati Tripathi	BJP	Ashok Goel	INC	Kunwar Karan Singh
Central Delhi	19	Sadar Bazar	AAP	Som Dutt	BJP	Manoj Kumar Jindal	INC	Anil Bhardwaj
Central Delhi	20	Chandni Chowk	AAP	Punardeep Singh Sawhney	BJP	Satish Jain	INC	Mudit Agarwal
Central Delhi	21	Matia Mahal	AAP	Aaley Mohammad Iqbal	BJP	Deepti Indora	INC	Asim Ahmed Khan
Central Delhi	22	Ballimaran	AAP	Imran Hussain	BJP	Kamal Bagri	INC	Haroon Yusuf
Central Delhi	23	Karol Bagh (SC)	AAP	Vishesh Ravi	BJP	Dushyant Kumar Gautam	INC	Rahul Dhanak
New Delhi	24	Patel Nagar (SC)	AAP	Pravesh Ratn	BJP	Raaj Kumar Anand	INC	Krishna Tirath
West Delhi	25	Moti Nagar	AAP	Shiv Charan Goel	BJP	Harish Khurana	INC	Rajender Namdhari
West Delhi	26	Madipur (SC)	AAP	Rakhi Birla	BJP	Kailash Gangwal	INC	Jai Prakash Panwar
West Delhi	27	Rajouri Garden	AAP	Dhanwati Chandela	BJP	Manjinder Singh Sirsa	INC	Dharmpal Chandila
West Delhi	28	Hari Nagar	AAP	Surinder Setia	BJP	Shyam Sharma	INC	Prem Sharma
West Delhi	29	Tilak Nagar	AAP	Jarnail Singh	BJP	Shweta Saini	INC	PS Bawa
West Delhi	30	Janakpuri	AAP	Pravin Kumar	BJP	Ashish Sood	INC	Harbani Kaur
South West Delhi	31	Vikaspuri	AAP	Mahinder Yadav	BJP	Dr. Pankaj Kumar Singh	INC	Jitender Solanki
South West Delhi	32	Uttam Nagar	AAP	Pooja Naresh Balyan	BJP	Pawan Sharma	INC	Mukesh Sharma
South West Delhi	33	Dwarka	AAP	Vinay Mishra	BJP	Parduymn Rajput	INC	Adarsh Shastri
South West Delhi	34	Matiala	AAP	Sumesh Shokeen	BJP	Sandeep Sehrawat	INC	Raghuvinder Shokeen
South West Delhi	35	Najafgarh	AAP	Tarun Yadav	BJP	Neelam Pahalwan	INC	Sushma Yadav
South West Delhi	36	Bijwasan	AAP	Surender Bharadwaj	BJP	Kailash Gahlot	INC	Devinder Sehrawat
South West Delhi	37	Palam	AAP	Joginder Solanki	BJP	Kuldeep Solanki	INC	Mange Ram
New Delhi	38	Delhi Cantonment	AAP	Virender Singh Kadian	BJP	Bhuvan Tanwar	INC	Pradeep Kumar Upmanyu
New Delhi	39	Rajinder Nagar	AAP	Durgesh Pathak	BJP	Umang Bajaj	INC	Vineet Yadav
New Delhi	40	New Delhi	AAP	Arvind Kejriwal	BJP	Parvesh Verma	INC	Sandeep Dikshit
South East Delhi	41	Jangpura	AAP	Manish Sisodia	BJP	Tarvinder Singh Marwah	INC	Farhad Suri
South East Delhi	42	Kasturba Nagar	AAP	Ramesh Pehelwan	BJP	Neeraj Basoya	INC	Abhishek Dutt
South Delhi	43	Malviya Nagar	AAP	Somnath Bharti	BJP	Satish Upadhyay	INC	Jitendra Kumar Kochar
New Delhi	44	R. K. Puram	AAP	Pramila Tokas	BJP	Anil Kumar Sharma	INC	Vishesh Tokas
South Delhi	45	Mehrauli	AAP	Mahender Chaudhary	BJP	Gajender Yadav	INC	Pushpa Singh
South Delhi	46	Chhatarpur	AAP	Brahm Singh Tanwar	BJP	Kartar Singh Tanwar	INC	Rajinder Tanwar
South Delhi	47	Deoli (SC)	AAP	Prem Kumar Chauhan	LJP(RV)	Deepak Tanwar	INC	Rajesh Chauhan
South Delhi	48	Ambedkar Nagar (SC)	AAP	Ajay Dutt	BJP	Khushiram Chunar	INC	Jay Prakash
South East Delhi	49	Sangam Vihar	AAP	Dinesh Mohaniya	BJP	Chandan Kumar Chaudhary	INC	Harsh Chaudhary
New Delhi	50	Greater Kailash	AAP	Saurabh Bhardwaj	BJP	Shikha Rai	INC	Gravit Singhvi
South East Delhi	51	Kalkaji	AAP	Atishi Marlena	BJP	Ramesh Bidhuri	INC	Alka Lamba
South East Delhi	52	Tughlakabad	AAP	Sahi Ram	BJP	Rohtas Bidhuri	INC	Virender Bidhuri
South East Delhi	53	Badarpur	AAP	Ram Singh Netaji	BJP	Narayan Dutt Sharma	INC	Arjun Bhadana
South East Delhi	54	Okhla	AAP	Amanatullah Khan	BJP	Manish Chaudhary	INC	Ariba Khan
East Delhi	55	Trilokpuri (SC)	AAP	Anjana Parcha	BJP	Ravikant Ujjain	INC	Amardeep
East Delhi	56	Kondli (SC)	AAP	Kuldeep Kumar	BJP	Priyanka Gautam	INC	Akshay Kumar
East Delhi	57	Patparganj	AAP	Avadh Ojha	BJP	Ravinder Singh Negi	INC	Anil Chaudhary
East Delhi	58	Laxmi Nagar	AAP	B.B. Tyagi	BJP	Abhay Verma	INC	Sumit Sharma
Shahdara	59	Vishwas Nagar	AAP	Deepak Singla	BJP	Om Prakash Sharma	INC	Rajiv Chaudhary
East Delhi	60	Krishna Nagar	AAP	Vikas Bagga	BJP	Dr. Anil Goyal	INC	Gurcharan Singh Raju
East Delhi	61	Gandhi Nagar	AAP	Naveen Chaudhary	BJP	Arvinder Singh Lovely	INC	Kamal Arora
Shahdara	62	Shahdara	AAP	Jitender Singh Shunty	BJP	Sanjay Goyal	INC	Jagat Singh
Shahdara	63	Seemapuri (SC)	AAP	Veer Singh Dhingan	BJP	Rinku Kumari	INC	Rajesh Lilothia
Shahdara	64	Rohtas Nagar	AAP	Sarita Singh	BJP	Jitender Mahajan	INC	Suresh Wali Chauhan
North East Delhi	65	Seelampur	AAP	Chaudhary Zubair Ahmad	BJP	Anil Gaur	INC	Abdul Rehman
North East Delhi	66	Ghonda	AAP	Gaurav Sharma	BJP	Ajay Mahawar	INC	Bheesham Sharma
Shahdara	67	Babarpur	AAP	Gopal Rai	BJP	Anil Vashishtha	INC	Haji Mohd Ishraq Khan
North East Delhi	68	Gokalpur (SC)	AAP	Surendra Kumar	BJP	Praveen Nimesh	INC	Ishwar Bagri
North East Delhi	69	Mustafabad	AAP	Adil Ahmad Khan	BJP	Mohan Singh Bisht	INC	Ali Mahndi
North East Delhi	70	Karawal Nagar	AAP	Manoj Tyagi	BJP	Kapil Mishra	INC	P. K. Mishra

== Campaigns ==
=== Aam Aadmi Party ===
The Aam Aadmi Party campaign was kickstarted by Arvind Kejriwal. As part of its campaign the party announced various schemes such as the Mahila Samman Yojana that would include providing monthly financial assistance of ₹2,100 to women and the Pujari Granthi Samman Yojana that would provide financial assistance of ₹18,000 to temple pujaris and granthis of gurudwaras.

=== Bharatiya Janata Party ===
The opposition BJP started its campaign with the Parivartan Yatra, highlighting the corruption of the AAP government. Key issues used by the party includes controversy regarding Sheesh Mahal, liquor policy, and Yamuna river pollution. Later prime minister Narendra Modi officially launched the party campaign at a rally in Rohini, where he criticized the government on issues of water shortages, pollution etc. as well as calling the government an "Aapda" (transl. Disaster).

Manifesto

The BJP's election manifesto focused on welfare, governance, and anti-corruption measures, targeting women, senior citizens, and underprivileged communities. The manifesto promised to implement the Mahila Samridhi Yojana, providing ₹2,500 per month to women, along with ₹21,000 and six nutrition kits for pregnant women under the Matri Suraksha Vandana scheme. The BJP pledged to increase pensions for senior citizens, widows, and destitute women, while introducing subsidies for LPG cylinders and free cylinders on Holi and Diwali. Additionally, it proposed establishing Atal Canteens to provide affordable meals for ₹5 in slum clusters. The manifesto also emphasized continuing all existing welfare schemes, including free electricity for households consuming up to 200 units and free DTC bus rides for women, while vowing to eradicate corruption and implement Central government schemes like Ayushman Bharat Yojana which have been blocked by the incumbent AAP government.

=== Indian National Congress ===
The Indian National Congress announced that it would hold a month-long Dillī Nyāya Yātrā in November (transl. Delhi Justice March) to attack the state and central governments on issues such as pollution, inflation, unemployment, and garbage disposal.

The yatra was launched by Himachal Pradesh chief minister Sukhvinder Singh Sukhu on 8 November and was to cover all seventy assembly constituencies in four phases. The first phase of the yatra was launched in Rajghat on 8 November 2024 and ended in Shalimar Bagh on 13 November, covering 15 assembly constituencies. The second phase of the yatra started from Gokulpuri in North East Delhi on 16 November until 20 November, covering 16 assembly constituencies. In the second phase, party chief Yadav highlighted sanitation, problems faced by daily wagers and hawkers as the main issues plaguing Delhi. The third phase started from Valmiki Mandir at Palam village on 22 November. The party accused the AAP state government of failing to resolve basic problems, such as supply of dirty water, increased electricity bills, long wait for ration cards and pension for beneficiaries in the 10 last years. The march concluded on 7 December 2024.

Delhi PCC chief Devender Yadav criticised Kejriwal for promising ₹2,100 per month to Delhi women, saying that the AAP had failed to fulfil its promise of giving ₹1,000 per month to women in Punjab.

Manifesto

The Congress party announced that it would provide universal health insurance to all Delhi residents covering costs up to ₹25 lakhs, akin to the Right to Health Act it passed in Rajasthan during its rule in the state.

On January 6, Karnataka Deputy Chief Minister D. K. Shivakumar announced the Pyari Didi Yojna, a proposed scheme that would provide financial assistance of ₹2,500 per month to women in Delhi, should the Congress party come to power. He highlighted that this initiative would be modeled after the Gruha Lakshmi scheme implemented by the Congress government in Karnataka, which he said benefited 1.22 crore women in the state. He further claimed that all guarantees made by the Congress in Karnataka were met within three months of taking office.

== Voting ==
=== Voting turnout by district ===
District	Turnout
North Delhi	59.61▼
North West Delhi	60.71▼
North East Delhi	66.25▼
West Delhi	60.98▼
Central Delhi	59.12▼
East Delhi	62.49▼
South Delhi	58.20▼
South West Delhi	61.33▼
South East Delhi	56.40▼
New Delhi	57.23▲
Shahdara	63.99▼
Total	60.54▼

=== Voting turnout by constituency ===
District	Constituency		Turnout
North Delhi	1	Narela	61.84
Central Delhi	2	Burari	59.48
Central Delhi	3	Timarpur	55.90
North Delhi	4	Adarsh Nagar	56.55
North Delhi	5	Badli	62.53
North West Delhi	6	Rithala	57.88
North Delhi	7	Bawana (SC)	59.42
North West Delhi	8	Mundka	60.30
North West Delhi	9	Kirari	62.39
North West Delhi	10	Sultanpur Majra (SC)	60.25
West Delhi	11	Nangloi Jat	59.02
North West Delhi	12	Mangolpuri (SC)	64.81
North Delhi	13	Rohini	62.15
North West Delhi	14	Shalimar Bagh	58.28
North Delhi	15	Shakur Basti	63.56
North West Delhi	16	Tri Nagar	62.21
North Delhi	17	Wazirpur	55.65
North Delhi	18	Model Town	53.40
Central Delhi	19	Sadar Bazar	60.40
Central Delhi	20	Chandni Chowk	55.96
Central Delhi	21	Matia Mahal	65.10
Central Delhi	22	Ballimaran	63.87
Central Delhi	23	Karol Bagh (SC)	54.55
New Delhi	24	Patel Nagar (SC)	58.30
West Delhi	25	Moti Nagar	58.77
West Delhi	26	Madipur (SC)	63.00
West Delhi	27	Rajouri Garden	63.00
West Delhi	28	Hari Nagar	60.74
West Delhi	29	Tilak Nagar	60.05
West Delhi	30	Janakpuri	61.50
South West Delhi	31	Vikaspuri	58.50
South West Delhi	32	Uttam Nagar	61.50
South West Delhi	33	Dwarka	61.96
South West Delhi	34	Matiala	60.37
South West Delhi	35	Najafgarh	64.13
South West Delhi	36	Bijwasan	61.13
South West Delhi	37	Palam	62.41
New Delhi	38	Delhi Cantonment	59.30
New Delhi	39	Rajinder Nagar	61.25
New Delhi	40	New Delhi	56.41
South East Delhi	41	Jangpura	57.42
South East Delhi	42	Kasturba Nagar	54.10
South Delhi	43	Malviya Nagar	53.04
New Delhi	44	R. K. Puram	54.01
South Delhi	45	Mehrauli	53.04
South Delhi	46	Chhatarpur	62.70
South Delhi	47	Deoli (SC)	59.57
South Delhi	48	Ambedkar Nagar (SC)	59.47
South East Delhi	49	Sangam Vihar	60.80
New Delhi	50	Greater Kailash	54.50
South East Delhi	51	Kalkaji	54.59
South East Delhi	52	Tughlakabad	55.80
South East Delhi	53	Badarpur	56.93
South East Delhi	54	Okhla	54.90
East Delhi	55	Trilokpuri (SC)	65.29
East Delhi	56	Kondli (SC)	62.90
East Delhi	57	Patparganj	60.70
East Delhi	58	Laxmi Nagar	60.50
Shahdara	59	Vishwas Nagar	60.50
East Delhi	60	Krishna Nagar	64.00
East Delhi	61	Gandhi Nagar	61.01
Shahdara	62	Shahdara	62.58
Shahdara	63	Seemapuri (SC)	65.27
Shahdara	64	Rohtas Nagar	65.10
North East Delhi	65	Seelampur	68.70
North East Delhi	66	Ghonda	61.03
Shahdara	67	Babarpur	65.99
North East Delhi	68	Gokalpur (SC)	68.29
North East Delhi	69	Mustafabad	69.00
North East Delhi	70	Karawal Nagar	64.44
Total			60.54

== Surveys and polls ==
=== Exit Polls ===
Polling Agency					
Polling Agency	AAP	NDA	INC	Others	Lead
Matrize	32-37	35-40	0-1	0-0	HUNG
P-Marq	21–31	39-49	0–1	0-0	8-28
People's Insight	15	54	1	0	39
People's Pulse - Codemo	10-19	51-60	0-0	0-0	32-50
Poll Diary	18-25	42-50	0-2	0-0	17-32
Chanakya Strategies	25-28	39-44	2-3	0-1	11-19
DV Research	26-34	36-44	0-0	0-0	2-18
JVC	22-31	39-45	0-2	0-0	8-23
Mind Brink	44-49	21-25	0-1	0-0	19-28
Weepreside	46-52	18-23	0-1	0-0	23-34
SAS Group	27-30	38-41	1-3	0-0	8-14
Superbo-Poll	38-43	20-25	7-12	0-0	13-23
Axis My India	15-25	45-55	0-1	0-0	20-40
CNX	10-19	49-61	0-1	0-0	30-51
Today's Chanakya	13–25	45-57	0–1	0–3	20-44
Average	26–33	37-43	0–1	0-0	4-17
Actual Result	22	48	0	0	26

== Results ==
=== Results by alliance or party ===
Vote share by party
1. National Democratic Alliance (47.1%)
2. Aam Aadmi Party (43.6%)
3. Indian National Congress (6.34%)
4. Others (2.37%)
5. NOTA (0.57%)
Seat share by party
1. Bharatiya Janata Party (68.6%)
2. Aam Aadmi Party (31.4%)

Alliance/ Party		Popular vote			Seats		
Alliance/ Party		Votes	%	±pp	Contested	Won	+/−
NDA	Bharatiya Janata Party	4,323,110	45.56	▲7.05	68	48	▲40
NDA	Janata Dal (United)	100,580	1.06	▲0.15	1	0	Steady
NDA	Lok Janshakti Party (Ram Vilas)	50,209	0.53	▲0.18	1	0	Steady
NDA	Total	4,473,899	47.15	▲8.64	70	48	▲40
Aam Aadmi Party		4,133,898	43.57	▼10.00	70	22	▼40
Indian National Congress		601,922	6.34	▲2.08	70	0	Steady
Other parties and Independents		224,825	2.37	▲0.48	70	0	Steady
NOTA		53,738	0.57	▲0.11	Steady	Steady	Steady
Total		9,488,282	100	Steady	699	70	Steady

=== Results by district ===
District	Seats		
District	Seats	BJP	AAP
North Delhi	8	8	0
North West Delhi	7	5	2
North East Delhi	5	3	2
West Delhi	7	6	1
Central Delhi	7	1	6
East Delhi	6	5	1
South Delhi	5	3	2
South West Delhi	7	7	0
South East Delhi	7	3	4
New Delhi	6	4	2
Shahdara	5	3	2
Total	70	48	22

=== Results by constituency ===
Constituency		Winner				Runner-up				Margin	
#	Name	Candidate	Party	Votes	%	Candidates	Party	Votes	%	Votes	%
1	Narela	Raj Karan Khatri	BJP	87,215	49.91	Sharad Chauhan	AAP	78,619	44.99	8,596	4.92
2	Burari	Sanjeev Jha	AAP	121,181	47.57	Shailendra Kumar	JD(U)	100,580	39.48	20,601	8.09
3	Timarpur	Surya Prakash Khatri	BJP	55,941	46.03	Surinder Pal Singh	AAP	54,773	45.07	1,168	0.96
4	Adarsh Nagar	Raj Kumar Bhatia	BJP	52,510	52.27	Mukesh Kumar Goel	AAP	41,028	40.84	11,482	11.43
5	Badli	Deepak Chaudhary	BJP	61,192	40.56	Ajesh Yadav	AAP	46,029	30.51	15,163	10.05
6	Rithala	Kulwant Rana	BJP	104,371	55.76	Mohinder Goyal	AAP	74,755	39.94	29,616	15.82
7	Bawana (SC)	Ravinder Indraj Singh	BJP	119,515	51.99	Jai Bhagwan	AAP	88,040	38.30	31,475	13.69
8	Mundka	Gajender Drall	BJP	89,839	47.07	Jasbir Karala	AAP	79,289	41.54	10,550	5.53
9	Kirari	Anil Jha Vats	AAP	105,780	52.26	Bajrang Shukla	BJP	83,909	41.45	21,871	10.81
10	Sultanpur Majra (SC)	Mukesh Kumar Ahlawat	AAP	58,767	52.09	Karam Singh Karma	BJP	41,641	36.91	17,126	15.18
11	Nangloi Jat	Manoj Kumar Shokeen	BJP	75,272	47.25	Raghuvinder Shokeen	AAP	49,021	30.77	26,251	16.48
12	Mangolpuri (SC)	Raj Kumar Chauhan	BJP	62,007	50.23	Rakesh Jatav	AAP	55,752	45.16	6,255	5.07
13	Rohini	Vijendra Gupta	BJP	70,365	65.01	Pardeep Mittal	AAP	32,549	30.07	37,816	34.94
14	Shalimar Bagh	Rekha Gupta	BJP	68,200	59.95	Bandana Kumari	AAP	38,605	33.93	29,595	26.02
15	Shakur Basti	Karnail Singh	BJP	56,869	57.07	Satyendra Jain	AAP	35,871	36.00	20,998	21.07
16	Tri Nagar	Tilak Ram Gupta	BJP	59,073	53.36	Preeti Tomar	AAP	43,177	39.00	15,896	14.36
17	Wazirpur	Poonam Sharma	BJP	54,721	51.24	Rajesh Gupta	AAP	43,296	40.54	11,425	10.70
18	Model Town	Ashok Goel	BJP	52,108	54.10	Akhilesh Pati Tripathi	AAP	38,693	40.17	13,415	13.93
19	Sadar Bazar	Som Dutt	AAP	56,177	47.45	Manoj Kumar Jindal	BJP	49,870	42.12	6,307	5.33
20	Chandni Chowk	Punardeep Singh Sawhney	AAP	38,993	54.79	Satish Jain	BJP	22,421	31.50	16,572	23.29
21	Matia Mahal	Aaley Mohammad Iqbal	AAP	58,120	68.80	Deepti Indora	BJP	15,396	18.23	42,724	50.57
22	Ballimaran	Imran Hussain	AAP	57,004	58.00	Kamal Bagri	BJP	27,181	27.66	29,823	30.34
23	Karol Bagh (SC)	Vishesh Ravi	AAP	52,297	50.88	Dushyant Kumar Gautam	BJP	44,867	43.65	7,430	7.23
24	Patel Nagar (SC)	Pravesh Ratn	AAP	57,512	49.00	Raaj Kumar Anand	BJP	53,463	45.55	4,049	3.45
25	Moti Nagar	Harish Khurana	BJP	57,565	52.64	Shiv Charan Goel	AAP	45,908	41.98	11,657	10.66
26	Madipur (SC)	Kailash Gangwal	BJP	52,019	46.08	Rakhi Birla	AAP	41,120	36.42	10,899	9.66
27	Rajouri Garden	Manjinder Singh Sirsa	BJP	64,132	55.86	A. Dhanwati Chandela	AAP	45,942	40.02	18,190	15.84
28	Hari Nagar	Shyam Sharma	BJP	50,179	48.70	Surinder Setia	AAP	43,547	42.26	6,632	6.44
29	Tilak Nagar	Jarnail Singh	AAP	52,134	54.02	Shveta Saini	BJP	40,478	41.94	11,656	12.08
30	Janakpuri	Ashish Sood	BJP	68,986	55.27	Praveen Kumar	AAP	50,220	40.23	18,766	15.04
31	Vikaspuri	Pankaj Kumar Singh	BJP	135,564	49.54	Mahinder Yadav	AAP	122,688	44.83	12,876	4.71
32	Uttam Nagar	Pawan Sharma	BJP	103,613	52.84	Posh Balyan	AAP	73,873	37.67	29,740	15.17
33	Dwarka	Parduymn Rajput	BJP	69,137	49.56	Vinay Mishra	AAP	61,308	43.95	7,829	5.61
34	Matiala	Sandeep Sehrawat	BJP	146,295	52.46	Sumesh Shokeen	AAP	117,572	42.16	28,723	10.30
35	Najafgarh	Neelam Pahalwan	BJP	101,708	56.40	Tarun Kumar	AAP	72,699	40.31	29,009	16.09
36	Bijwasan	Kailash Gahlot	BJP	64,951	49.77	Surender Bharadwaj	AAP	53,675	41.13	11,276	8.64
37	Palam	Kuldeep Solanki	BJP	82,046	50.45	Joginder Solanki	AAP	73,094	44.95	8,952	5.50
38	Delhi Cantonment	Virender Singh Kadian	AAP	22,191	46.76	Bhuvan Tanwar	BJP	20,162	42.48	2,029	4.28
39	Rajinder Nagar	Umang Bajaj	BJP	46,671	48.01	Durgesh Pathak	AAP	45,440	46.74	1,231	1.27
40	New Delhi	Parvesh Verma	BJP	30,088	48.82	Arvind Kejriwal	AAP	25,999	42.20	4,199	6.64
41	Jangpura	Tarvinder Singh Marwah	BJP	38,859	45.44	Manish Sisodia	AAP	38,184	44.65	675	0.79
42	Kasturba Nagar	Neeraj Basoya	BJP	38,067	45.06	Abhishek Dutt	INC	27,019	31.98	11,048	13.08
43	Malviya Nagar	Satish Upadhyay	BJP	39,564	46.53	Somnath Bharti	AAP	37,433	44.02	2,131	2.51
44	R. K. Puram	Anil Kumar Sharma	BJP	43,260	56.55	Parmila Tokas	AAP	28,807	37.65	14,453	18.90
45	Mehrauli	Gajender Singh Yadav	BJP	48,349	41.67	Mahender Chaudhary	AAP	46,567	40.13	1,782	1.54
46	Chhatarpur	Kartar Singh Tanwar	BJP	80,469	48.98	Brahm Singh Tanwar	AAP	74,230	45.18	6,239	3.80
47	Deoli (SC)	Prem Chauhan	AAP	86,889	55.09	Deepak Tanwar	LJP(RV)	50,209	31.83	36,680	13.26
48	Ambedkar Nagar (SC)	Ajay Dutt	AAP	46,285	47.62	Khushi Ram Chunar	BJP	46,055	43.27	4,230	4.35
49	Sangam Vihar	Chandan Kumar Choudhary	BJP	54,049	42.99	Dinesh Mohaniya	AAP	53,705	42.72	344	0.27
50	Greater Kailash	Shikha Roy	BJP	49,594	47.74	Saurabh Bharadwaj	AAP	46,406	44.67	3,188	3.07
51	Kalkaji	Atishi Marlena	AAP	52,154	48.80	Ramesh Bidhuri	BJP	48,633	45.50	3,521	3.30
52	Tughlakabad	Sahi Ram	AAP	62,155	54.08	Rohtash Kumar	BJP	47,444	41.28	14,711	12.80
53	Badarpur	Ram Singh Netaji	AAP	112,991	54.30	Narayan Dutt Sharma	BJP	87,103	41.86	25,888	12.44
54	Okhla	Amanatullah Khan	AAP	88,943	42.45	Manish Chaudhary	BJP	65,304	31.17	23,639	11.28
55	Trilokpuri (SC)	Ravi Kant Ujjain	BJP	58,217	46.10	Anjana Parcha	AAP	57,825	45.79	392	0.31
56	Kondli (SC)	Kuldeep Kumar	AAP	61,792	48.00	Priyanka Gautam	BJP	55,499	43.11	6,293	4.89
57	Patparganj	Ravinder Singh Negi	BJP	74,060	53.41	Awadh Ojha	AAP	45,988	33.17	28,702	20.24
58	Laxmi Nagar	Abhay Verma	BJP	65,858	52.11	B B Tyagi	AAP	54,316	42.98	11,542	9.13
59	Vishwas Nagar	Om Prakash Sharma	BJP	72,141	57.70	Deepak Singhal	AAP	46,955	37.67	25,042	20.03
60	Krishna Nagar	Anil Goyal	BJP	75,922	52.94	Vikas Bagga	AAP	56,424	39.35	19,498	13.59
61	Gandhi Nagar	Arvinder Singh Lovely	BJP	56,858	53.94	Naveen Chaudhary	AAP	44,110	41.85	12,748	12.09
62	Shahdara	Sanjay Goyal	BJP	62,788	49.63	Jitender Singh Shunty	AAP	57,610	45.54	5,178	4.09
63	Seemapuri (SC)	Veer Singh Dhingan	AAP	66,353	48.45	Rinku Kumari	BJP	55,985	40.88	10,368	7.57
64	Rohtas Nagar	Jitender Mahajan	BJP	82,896	57.44	Sarita Singh	AAP	54,994	38.11	27,902	19.33
65	Seelampur	Chaudhary Zubair Ahmad	AAP	79,009	59.21	Anil Gaur	BJP	36,532	27.38	42,477	31.83
66	Ghonda	Ajay Mahawar	BJP	79,987	56.96	Gaurav Sharma	AAP	53,929	38.41	26,058	18.55
67	Babarpur	Gopal Rai	AAP	76,192	53.19	Anil Vashishtha	BJP	57,198	39.93	18,994	13.26
68	Gokalpur (SC)	Surendra Kumar	AAP	80,504	48.48	Praveen Nimesh	BJP	72,297	43.54	8,207	4.94
69	Mustafabad	Mohan Singh Bisht	BJP	85,215	42.36	Adil Ahmad Khan	AAP	67,637	33.62	17,578	8.74
70	Karawal Nagar	Kapil Mishra	BJP	107,367	53.39	Manoj Tyagi	AAP	84,012	41.78	23,355	11.61

=== Results by margin ===
Highest
	Name	Constituency	District	Party	Margin	%
1.	Aaley Mohammad Iqbal	Matia Mahal	Chandni Chowk	AAP	42,724	50.57
2.	Chaudhary Zubair Ahmad	Seelampur	North East Delhi	AAP	42,477	31.83
3.	Vijender Gupta	Rohini	North West Delhi	BJP	37,816	34.94
4.	Prem Chauhan	Deoli	South Delhi	AAP	36,680	13.26
5.	Ravinder Indraj Singh	Bawana	North West Delhi	BJP	31,475	13.69

Lowest
	Name	Constituency	District	Party	Margin	%
1.	Chandan Kumar Choudhary	Sangam Vihar	South Delhi	BJP	344	0.27
2.	Ravi Kant Ujjain	Trilokpuri	East Delhi	BJP	392	0.31
3.	Tarvinder Singh Marwah	Jangpura	South Delhi	BJP	675	0.79
4.	Surya Prakash Khatri	Timarpur	North Delhi	BJP	1,168	0.96
5.	Umang Bajaj	Rajinder Nagar	New Delhi	BJP	1,231	1.27

== Aftermath ==
The BJP returned to power in Delhi after 27 years. On 20 February, Rekha Gupta took oath as the new chief minister, being the fourth BJP CM from the state.

== See also ==
- 2022 Delhi Municipal Corporation election
- 2025 elections in India
- Elections in Delhi
