= Naresh Balyan =

Indian politician

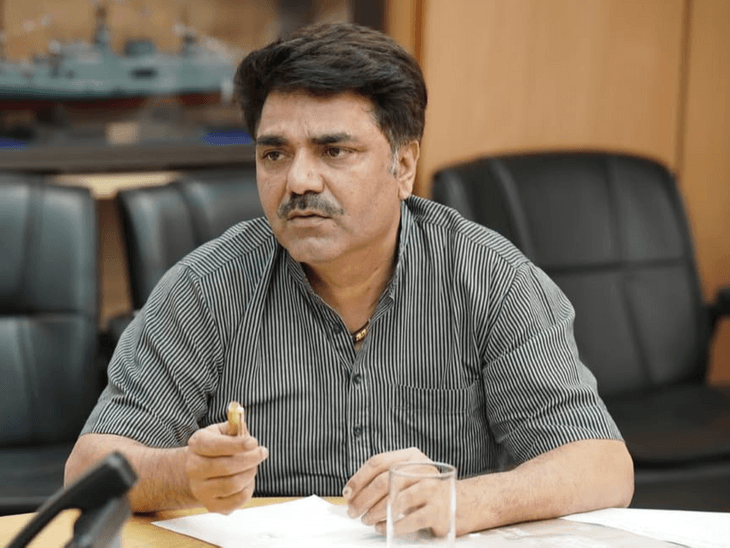

Member of the Delhi Legislative Assembly for Uttam Nagar
- In office 10 February 2015 – 8 February 2025
- Preceded by: Pawan Sharma
- Succeeded by: Pawan Sharma

Personal details
- Born: 22 November 1976 (age 49) Delhi, India
- Party: Aam Aadmi Party
- Children: 1 Son
- Education: Haryana Shakti Senior Secondary School
- Profession: Politician

Naresh Balyan is an Indian politician and a member of the Delhi Legislative Assembly in India. He represented the Uttam Nagar constituency of New Delhi and is a member of the Aam Aadmi Party political party.

== Early life and education ==
Naresh Balyan was born in Delhi. He attended the Haryana Shakti Senior Secondary School.

== Political career ==
Naresh Balyan has been an MLA for two terms. He represented the Uttam Nagar constituency and is a member of the Aam Aadmi Party political party.

On 21 September 2015, Balyan complained to police that a fake letter containing his forged signature was spread in the social media. In the letter, it alleges that Balyan bought onions from the government at Rs 26 per kg and sold them at Rs 30 per kg. Balyan said that the language used in the fabricated letter made no sense, moreover the government does not provide onions to the MLAs for sale.

He has served as the DDC Chairman - South Delhi and was a councillor since 2012.

== Arrest ==
On 30 November 2024, Balyan was arrested in a year old extortion case by the Delhi Police, the police commented that his arrest came after an investigation uncovered an audio clip of a purported conversation between him and a gangster named Kapil Sangwan, who is reportedly operating from abroad. The conversation allegedly showed the two discussing the collection of ransom money from businessmen.

== Member of Legislative Assembly ==
In 2015 he was elected as the MLA representing Uttam Nagar in the Sixth Legislative Assembly of Delhi. He was re-elected to the Delhi Legislative Assembly in 2020. He lost in 2025.

Committee assignments of Delhi Legislative Assembly

- Chairman - Unauthorised Colony Committee

Committee assignments of Delhi Legislative Assembly

- Member (2022-2023), Public Accounts Committee

== Electoral performance ==
Delhi Assembly elections, 2015: Uttam Nagar
Party	Candidate	Votes	%	±%
AAP	Naresh Balyan	85,881	51.99	+26.71
BJP	Pawan Sharma	55,462	33.58	−2.80
INC	Mukesh Sharma	20,703	12.53	−19.08
BSP	Abdul Hamid Barshid	884	0.54	−0.68
NOTA	None	672	0.41	−0.27
Majority		30,419	18.42	+13.65
Turnout		1,65,231	71.14	
AAP gain from BJP		Swing	+26.71	

Delhi Assembly elections, 2025: Uttam Nagar
Party	Candidate	Votes	%	±%
BJP	Pawan Sharma	103,613	52.8	+9.05
AAP	Pooja Naresh Balyan	73,873	37.7	−16.87
INC	Mukesh Sharma	15,565	7.9	
NOTA	None of the above	1,217	0.4	
Majority		29,740	15.3	
Turnout		1,94,876	61.9	−
BJP hold		Swing	BJP	

Delhi Assembly elections, 2020: Uttam Nagar
Party	Candidate	Votes	%	±%
AAP	Naresh Balyan	99,622	54.57	+2.58
BJP	Krishan Gahlot	79,863	43.75	+10.17
RJD	Shakti Kumar Bishnoi	377	0.21	New
NOTA	None of the above	838	0.46	+0.05
Majority		19,759	10.82	−7.60
Turnout		1,82,606	64.12	−7.02
AAP hold		Swing	+2.58	

State Legislative Assembly
Preceded by ?	Member of the Delhi Legislative Assembly from Uttam Nagar Assembly constituency 2020–	Incumbent
