= Madan Lal (politician) =

Indian politician

Member of the Delhi Legislative Assembly for Kasturba Nagar
- In office 2013–2025
- Preceded by: Neeraj Basoya
- Succeeded by: Neeraj Basoya

Personal details
- Party: Bharatiya Janata Party
- Other political affiliations: Aam Aadmi Party

Madan Lal is an Indian politician from Delhi. He was elected as an MLA to the Delhi Legislative Assembly from Kasturba Nagar constituency. He was president of the Saket Court Bar Association. He has been a three-time MLA from Kasturba Nagar, winning three consecutive elections on Aam Aadmi Party ticket in 2013, 2015 and 2020.

Madan Lal resigned from the Aam Aadmi Party on 31 January 2025 ahead of the 2025 Delhi Legislative Assembly election, after being denied the party ticket.

== Electoral performance ==
Delhi Assembly elections, 2020: Kasturba Nagar
Party	Candidate	Votes	%	±%
AAP	Madan Lal	37,100	40.45	−13.06
BJP	Ravinder Choudhary	33,935	37.00	+1.59
INC	Abhishek Dutt	19,648	21.42	+10.01
BSP	Khem Chand	283	0.31	−0.01
NOTA	None of the above	463	0.50	+0.08
Majority		3,165	3.45	−14.55
Turnout		91,895	59.87	−6.87
AAP hold		Swing	-13.06	

State Legislative Assembly
Preceded by Neeraj Basoya	Member of the Delhi Legislative Assembly from Kasturba Nagar Assembly constituency 2020– 2025	Succeeded by Neeraj Basoya
