= Aahir Deepak Chaudharyy =

Indian politician

Member of the Delhi Legislative Assembly
- Incumbent
- Assumed office 8 February 2025
- Preceded by: Ajesh Yadav
- Constituency: Badli

Personal details
- Party: Bharatiya Janata Party

Aahir Deepak Chaudharyy (born 1985) is an Indian politician from Delhi. He is a member of the Delhi Legislative Assembly from Badli Assembly constituency in North Delhi district. He won the 2025 Delhi Legislative Assembly election representing the Bharatiya Janata Party.

== Early life and education ==
Chaudharyy is from Badli, North Delhi district. He is the son of Narayan Singh Yadav. He completed his graduation in law at Sobhit University in 2017. He was DUSU joint secretary in 2005-2006 and municipal councilor of Samaypur Badli in 2009-2012

== Career ==
Chaudharyy won from Badli Assembly constituency representing the Bharatiya Janata Party in the 2025 Delhi Legislative Assembly election. He was also DUSU president and former municipal councillor of Samaypur Badli. He polled 61,192 votes and defeated his nearest rival, Ajesh Yadav of the Aam Aadmi Party, by a margin of 15,163 votes.
