= Gokalpur Assembly constituency =

Constituency of the Delhi legislative assembly in India

Coordinates: 28.703°N 77.283°E

Gokalpur
- Constituency No. 68 for the Delhi Legislative Assembly

Constituency details
- Country: India
- Region: North India
- State: Delhi
- District: North East Delhi
- Established: 2008
- Reservation: SC

Member of Legislative Assembly
- 8th Delhi Legislative Assembly
- Incumbent Surendra Kumar
- Party: AAP
- Elected year: 2025

Gokalpur is one of the seventy Delhi assembly constituencies of Delhi in northern India. Gokalpur assembly constituency is a part of North East Delhi (Lok Sabha constituency). This constituency was created by reorganisation by delimitation commission in 2008.

== Members of the Legislative Assembly ==
Election	Name	Party
2008	Surendra Kumar	Bahujan Samaj Party
2013	Ranjeet Singh Kashyap	Bharatiya Janata Party
2015	Fateh Singh	Aam Aadmi Party
2020	THAKUR ABHIRAJ SINGH	Aam Aadmi Party
2025	THAKUR ABHIRAJ SINGH	Aam Aadmi Party

== Election results ==
=== 2025 ===
Delhi Assembly elections, 2025: Gokalpur
Party	Candidate	Votes	%	±%
AAP	Surendra Kumar	50,504	38.48%	
BJP	THAKUR ABHIRAJ Singh Jadaun	1,12,297	59.54%	
INC	Ishwar Bagri	4,905	2.56%	
NOTA	None of the above			
Majority		61,793		
Turnout				
BJP hold		Swing		

=== 2020 ===
Delhi Assembly elections, 2020: Gokalpur
Party	Candidate	Votes	%	±%
AAP	Surendra Kumar	88,452	53.22	+4.61
BJP	Ranjeet Singh	68,964	41.50	+14.65
BSP	Praveen Kumar	4,599	2.77	−17.79
INC	SP Singh	2,233	1.34	−0.94
NOTA	None of the above	456	0.27	−0.08
NCP	Fateh Singh	420	0.25	
Majority		19,488	11.74	−10.12
Turnout		1,66,510	70.92	−3.31
AAP hold		Swing		

=== 2015 ===
Delhi Assembly elections, 2015: Gokalpur
Party	Candidate	Votes	%	±%
AAP	Fateh Singh	71,240	48.71	+25.57
BJP	Ranjeet Singh	39,272	26.85	−0.39
BSP	Surendra Kumar	30,080	20.56	+12.05
INC	Rinku	3,344	2.28	−10.14
NOTA	None of the above	526	0.35	−0.69
Majority		31,968	21.86	+20.36
Turnout		1,46,310	74.23	
AAP gain from BJP		Swing	+25.38	

=== 2013 ===
Delhi Assembly elections, 2013: Gokalpur
Party	Candidate	Votes	%	±%
BJP	Ranjeet Singh	34,888	27.24	+2.69
Independent	Surendra Kumar	32,966	25.74	
AAP	Devi Dayal	29,633	23.14	
INC	Balzor Singh	15,902	12.42	−13.26
BSP	Choudhary Balraj	10,899	8.51	−20.38
PECP	Dharm Raj Singh	1,034	0.81	
IJP	Roop Kishor	346	0.27	−0.35
LJP	Anil Kumar	339	0.26	
Independent	Ashok Kumar Gautam	272	0.21	
SP	Satyendri Pal Singh	184	0.14	−0.37
BSMM	Rajesh Kumar	136	0.11	
RLD	Rupesh Kumar	117	0.09	−2.11
NOTA	None	1,338	1.04	
Majority		1,922	1.50	−1.71
Turnout		128,122	71.68	
BJP gain from BSP		Swing	+2.69	

=== 2008 ===
Delhi Assembly elections, 2008: Gokalpur
Party	Candidate	Votes	%	±%
BSP	Surendra Kumar	27,449	28.89	
INC	Balzor Singh	24,442	25.68	
BJP	Ranjeet Singh	23,364	24.55	
Independent	Fateh Singh	10,262	10.78	
Independent	Choudhary Balraj	4,290	5.17	
RLD	Roop Chand	2,095	2.20	
Independent	Rup Kishor	972	1.02	
IJP	Hari Babu	589	0.62	
BSKP	Surander Singh	548	0.58	
SP	Jai Pal Singh	482	0.51	
Majority		3,057	3.21	
Turnout		95,173	61.6	
BSP win (new seat)				
