= Kasturba Nagar Assembly constituency =

Constituency of the Delhi legislative assembly in India

Coordinates: 28.578°N 77.224°E

Kasturba Nagar
- Constituency No. 42 for the Delhi Legislative Assembly

Constituency details
- Country: India
- Region: North India
- State: Delhi
- District: South East Delhi
- Lok Sabha constituency: New Delhi
- Established: 1993
- Reservation: None

Member of Legislative Assembly
- 8th Delhi Legislative Assembly
- Incumbent Neeraj Basoya
- Party: Bharatiya Janata Party
- Elected year: 2025

Kasturba Nagar Assembly constituency is one of the 70 legislative assembly constituencies of Delhi in northern India. Kasturba Nagar assembly constituency is a part of New Delhi (Lok Sabha constituency).

== Members of the Legislative Assembly ==
Election	Name	Party
1993	Jagdish Lal Batra	Bharatiya Janata Party
1998	Sushil Choudhary	Bharatiya Janata Party
2003	Sushil Choudhary	Bharatiya Janata Party
2008	Neeraj Basoya	Indian National Congress
2013	Madan Lal	Aam Aadmi Party
2015	Madan Lal	Aam Aadmi Party
2020	Madan Lal	Aam Aadmi Party
2025	Neeraj Basoya	Bharatiya Janata Party

== Election results ==
=== 2025 ===
Delhi Assembly elections, 2025: Kasturba Nagar
Party	Candidate	Votes	%	±%
BJP	Neeraj Basoya	38,067	45.06	+8.06
INC	Abhishek Dutt	27,019	31.98	+10.56
AAP	Ramesh Pehalwan	18,617	22.04	−18.41
NOTA	None of the above	472	0.56	+0.06
Majority		11,048	13.08	+9.62
Turnout		84,483	54.10	−5.77
BJP gain from AAP		Swing	+8.06	

=== 2020 ===
Delhi Assembly elections, 2020: Kasturba Nagar
Party	Candidate	Votes	%	±%
AAP	Madan Lal	37,100	40.45	−13.06
BJP	Ravinder Choudhary	33,935	37.00	+1.59
INC	Abhishek Dutt	19,648	21.42	+10.01
BSP	Khem Chand	283	0.31	−0.01
NOTA	None of the above	463	0.50	+0.08
Majority		3,165	3.45	−14.55
Turnout		91,895	59.87	−6.87
AAP hold		Swing	-13.06	

=== 2015 ===
Delhi Assembly elections, 2015: Kasturba Nagar
Party	Candidate	Votes	%	±%
AAP	Madan Lal	50,766	53.51	+15.48
BJP	Ravinder Choudhary	34,870	35.41	+2.67
INC	Neeraj Basoya	11,233	11.40	−16.01
BSP	Ramesh Kumar	317	0.32	−0.22
NOTA	None of the above	423	0.42	−0.27
Majority		15,896	18.10	+12.81
Turnout		98,535	66.56	
AAP hold		Swing	+15.48	

=== 2013 ===
Delhi Assembly elections, 2013: Kasturba Nagar
Party	Candidate	Votes	%	±%
AAP	Madan Lal	33,609	38.03	
BJP	Shikha Roy	28,935	32.74	−8.39
INC	Neeraj Basoya	24,227	27.41	−16.99
NOTA	None of the above	607	0.69	
Majority		4,674	5.29	+2.02
Turnout		88,500	65.64	
AAP gain from INC		Swing		

=== 2008 ===
Delhi Assembly elections, 2008: Kasturba Nagar
Party	Candidate	Votes	%	±%
INC	Neeraj Basoya	33,807	44.40	+0.61
BJP	Sushil Choudhary	31,323	41.13	−4.39
BSP	Satish Basoya	9,775	12.84	+5.90
SP	Prem Babbar	339	0.45	
Independent	Suresh	337	0.44	
Independent	Jameel Ahmad	197	0.26	
Independent	Manish Kathuria	151	0.20	
Independent	Amit Mishra	115	0.15	
Independent	Dinesh Kumar	105	0.14	
Majority		2,484	3.27	+1.54
Turnout		76,149	53.2	+8.05
INC gain from BJP		Swing	+0.61	

=== 2003 ===
Delhi Assembly elections, 2003: Kasturba Nagar
Party	Candidate	Votes	%	±%
BJP	Sushil Choudhary	17,949	45.52	+3.48
INC	Ashok Chopra	17,266	43.79	+3.63
BSP	Om Prakash	2,737	6.94	
NCP	Rajendra Baisoya	438	1.11	
SSGP	Beer Singh Negi	256	0.65	
JKNPP	Devender Nath Srivastava	248	0.63	
Independent	Mithlesh Jha	198	0.50	
Independent	Suresh Arora	169	0.43	
Independent	Narender Singhal	97	0.25	
JD(S)	S Rosey	70	0.18	
Majority		683	1.73	−0.15
Turnout		39,428	45.15	−3.76
BJP hold		Swing	+3.48	

=== 1998 ===
Delhi Assembly elections, 1998: Kasturba Nagar
Party	Candidate	Votes	%	±%
BJP	Sushil Choudhary	20,146	42.04	−13.68
INC	Ram Ratan Gupta	19,247	40.16	+6.66
Independent	Jagdish Lal Batra	6,825	14.24	
JD	Ram Karan Gupta	922	1.92	−6.19
Independent	Sunil Rawat	486	1.01	
Independent	Sumer Chand	297	0.62	
Majority		899	1.88	−20.34
Turnout		47,923	48.91	−6.53
BJP hold		Swing	-13.68	

=== 1993 ===
Delhi Assembly elections, 1993: Kasturba Nagar
Party	Candidate	Votes	%	±%
BJP	Jagdish Lal Batra	25,215	55.72	
INC	Des Raj Chhabra	15,159	33.50	
JD	Laxmi Chand Chechi	3,671	8.11	
Independent	Mithlesh Jha	608	1.34	
SP	Subash Chander	178	0.39	
Independent	Chander Pal	79	0.17	
Independent	Jai Kumar Jain	69	0.15	
BSP	Anand Singh	68	0.15	
Independent	Bunde Shah	61	0.13	
Doordarshi Party	Savitri Devi	48	0.11	
Independent	Brij Mohan	33	0.07	
Independent	Om Prakash Thakur	23	0.05	
Independent	Rajpal	21	0.05	
Independent	Ved Prakash Gupta	16	0.04	
Majority		10,056	22.22	
Turnout		45,249	55.44	
BJP hold		Swing		
