= Pankaj Kumar Singh (politician) =

Indian politician (born 1977)

Cabinet Minister, Government of Delhi
- Incumbent
- Assumed office 20 February 2025
- Lieutenant Governor: Vinai Kumar Saxena
- Chief Minister: Rekha Gupta
- Ministry and Departments: Health & Family Welfare; Transport; Information Technology
- Preceded by: Saurabh Bharadwaj

Member of Delhi Legislative Assembly
- Incumbent
- Assumed office 8 February 2025
- Preceded by: Mahinder Yadav
- Constituency: Vikaspuri

Personal details
- Born: Pankaj Kumar Singh; 6 November 1977 (age 49)
- Party: Bharatiya Janata Party
- Education: Bachelor in Dental Surgery
- Alma mater: Magadh University

Pankaj Kumar Singh (born 6 November 1977) is an Indian politician from Delhi. He is currently serving as the health and family welfare, transport and information technology minister of Delhi. He is a member of the Delhi Legislative Assembly representing Bharatiya Janata Party from Vikaspuri Assembly constituency in South West Delhi district.

== Early life and education ==
Singh was born in Buxar, Bihar and is a resident of Vikaspuri, South West Delhi district. He is the son of late Raj Mohan Singh, who was a former additional commissioner in MCD. He is a dentist. He completed his bachelor's degree in dental surgery at Magadh University, Bodh Gaya, Bihar in 1998. His wife, Rashmi Kumari, is also a dentist. Together they have two daughters, Bhavya Singh and Pragyata Singh.

== Career ==
Singh won from Vikaspuri Assembly constituency representing the Bharatiya Janata Party in the 2025 Delhi Legislative Assembly election. He polled 135,564 votes and defeated his nearest rival and sitting MLA, Mahinder Yadav of the Aam Aadmi Party, by a margin of 12,876 votes. Earlier, he served as a councillor in the Municipal Corporation of Delhi.
