= Badli, Delhi Assembly constituency =

Legislative assembly seat in Delhi

Coordinates: 28.733°N 77.144°E

Badli
- Constituency No. 5 for the Delhi Legislative Assembly

Constituency details
- Country: India
- Region: North India
- State: Delhi
- District: North West Delhi
- Established: 1993
- Reservation: None

Member of Legislative Assembly
- 8th Delhi Legislative Assembly
- Incumbent Deepak Chaudhary
- Party: Bharatiya Janata Party
- Elected year: 2025

Badli Assembly constituency is one of the 70 legislative assembly constituencies of Delhi in northern India. The Badli constituency is part of the North West Delhi (Lok Sabha) constituency.

== Members of the Legislative Assembly ==
Year	Member	Party
1993	Jai Bhagwan Aggarwal	Bharatiya Janata Party
1998	Jai Bhagwan Aggarwal	Bharatiya Janata Party
2003	Jai Bhagwan Aggarwal	Bharatiya Janata Party
2008	Devender Yadav	Indian National Congress
2013	Devender Yadav	Indian National Congress
2015	Ajesh Yadav	Aam Aadmi Party
2020	Ajesh Yadav	Aam Aadmi Party
2025	Deepak Chaudhary	Bharatiya Janata Party

== Election results ==
=== 2025 ===
Delhi Assembly elections, 2025: Badli
Party	Candidate	Votes	%	±%
BJP	Deepak Chaudhary	61,192	40.66	▲11.82
AAP	Ajesh Yadav	46,029	30.58	▼19.07
INC	Devender Yadav	41,071	27.29	▲7.64
NOTA	None of the above	692	0.45	▲0.01
Majority		15,163	10.08	
Turnout		1,50,495	62.53	▼1.08
BJP gain from AAP		Swing		

=== 2020 ===
Delhi Assembly elections, 2020: Badli
Party	Candidate	Votes	%	±%
AAP	Ajesh Yadav	69,427	49.65	▼1.49
BJP	Vijay Kumar Bhagat	40,333	28.84	▲9.00
INC	Devender Yadav	27,483	19.65	▼6.64
BSP	Laxman Kumar	579	0.41	▼0.07
NOTA	None of the above	609	0.44	▼0.06
Majority		29,094	20.81	▼4.04
Turnout		1,39,913	63.61	▼0.15
AAP hold		Swing	▼1.49	

=== 2015 ===
Delhi Assembly elections, 2015: Badli
Party	Candidate	Votes	%	±%
AAP	Ajesh Yadav	72,795	51.14	▲25.63
INC	Devender Yadav	37,419	26.29	▼18.31
BJP	Rajesh Yadav	28,238	19.84	▼5.77
BSP	Dr Javed Habib	685	0.48	▼1.26
NOTA	None of the above	713	0.50	▼0.30
Majority		35,376	24.85	▲5.89
Turnout		1,42,351	63.76	
AAP gain from INC		Swing	▲25.63	

=== 2013 ===
Delhi Assembly elections, 2013: Badli
Party	Candidate	Votes	%	±%
INC	Devender Yadav	54,372	44.60	+4.74
BJP	Vijay Kumar Bhagat	31,263	25.65	+6.60
AAP	Mohan Krishan	31,098	25.51	
BSP	Munawwar Hassan	2,125	1.74	−24.29
JD(U)	Mahesh Sahu	615	0.50	
Independent	Mohan Jha	418	0.34	
HND	Puneet Mandal	274	0.22	
RLD	Raj Kumar	253	0.21	
SP	Waqar Khan	204	0.17	
Independent	Manoj Kumar Pandey	190	0.16	
Independent	Jai Pal	108	0.09	
NOTA	None	978	0.80	
Majority		23,109	18.96	+5.13
Turnout		121,911	61.53	
INC hold		Swing	+4.74	

=== 2008 ===
Delhi Assembly elections, 2008: Badli
Party	Candidate	Votes	%	±%
INC	Devender Yadav	39,215	39.86	−0.70
BSP	Ajesh Yadav	25,611	26.03	+22.69
BJP	Rajesh Yadav	18,743	19.05	−34.28
NCP	Jitender Kumar	11,242	11.43	
RJD	Parwinder Singh	1,165	1.18	+0.74
Majority		13,604	13.83	+1.06
Turnout		98,381	57.1	+9.22
INC hold		Swing	-0.70	

=== 2003 ===
Delhi Assembly elections, 2003: Badli
Party	Candidate	Votes	%	±%
BJP	Jai Bhagwan Aggarwal	69,189	53.33	+5.38
INC	Dharm Vir Yadav	52,625	40.56	−2.35
BSP	Ramesh Chander	4,340	3.34	−0.98
LP(S)	Lakhan Singh	750	0.58	
RJD	Basuki Nath Chaoudhary	566	0.44	
Independent	Shiveners Mishra	560	0.43	
SS	Ch Anand	493	0.38	
SJP(R)	Dilip Kumar Aggarwal	313	0.24	
Independent	Gobind Dewan	310	0.24	
Independent	Anil Jindal	212	0.16	
Independent	Naresh Kumar Goyal	189	0.15	
Independent	Gopal Krishan Aggarwal	107	0.08	
Independent	Anil Gogia	94	0.07	
Majority		16,564	12.77	+7.73
Turnout		129,748	47.88	+2.02
BJP hold		Swing	+5.38	

=== 1998 ===
Delhi Assembly elections, 1998: Badli
Party	Candidate	Votes	%	±%
BJP	Jai Bhagwan Aggarwal	42,559	47.95	−0.80
INC	Narain Singh Yadav	37,882	42.91	+9.92
BSP	Phool Chand	3,808	4.32	−0.51
SAP	Ramesh Chander Sharma	2,509	2.85	
Independent	Manmeet Singh	997	1.13	
Lok Shakti	Ram Gopal Sisodia	239	0.27	+0.23
Independent	K L Garg	164	0.19	
Independent	Kanwar Sain Jain	139	0.16	
Independent	Nathu Ram Jain	69	0.06	
Independent	Anil Gogia	52	0.06	
Independent	Gulshan Kumar Bajaj	51	0.06	
Independent	Sanju Kumar Goel	27	0.03	
Majority		4,437	5.04	−10.72
Turnout		88,136	45.86	−14.66
BJP hold		Swing	-0.80	

=== 1993 ===
Delhi Assembly elections, 1993: Badli
Party	Candidate	Votes	%	±%
BJP	Jai Bhagwan Aggarwal	30,420	48.75	
INC	Rajesh Yadav	20,588	32.99	
JD	Satish Yadav	5,507	8.82	
BSP	Phool Chand	3,015	4.83	
DPP	Ramesh Chandra Sharma	1,320	2.12	
Independent	Radheshyam	271	0.43	
SOP(RP)	Shyam Mishra	200	0.32	
Independent	Parsu Ram	141	0.23	
SP	Arjun Singh Mundawar	130	0.21	
Independent	Mam Chand	82	0.13	
Independent	S P Dhingra	82	0.13	
Independent	Navender Bajaj	79	0.13	
Independent	Mahesh Kumar	70	0.11	
RVP	Ganga Ram Ambedkar	58	0.09	
Independent	Yash Pal	56	0.09	
Doordarshi Party	Laxmi Devi	46	0.07	
Independent	Rajinder	42	0.07	
Independent	S David	41	0.07	
Independent	Ajay Kumar Jain	37	0.06	
Independent	Satbir Singh	36	0.06	
Independent	Jagdish	31	0.05	
Independent	Bhagwan Singh	29	0.05	
Independent	Rajesh Jain	27	0.04	
Independent	Ram Gopal Sisodia	26	0.04	
Independent	Ajit Singh	25	0.04	
Independent	Govind	19	0.03	
Independent	A S Chawla	13	0.02	
Independent	Madhu Sudan	12	0.02	
Majority		9,832	15.76	
Turnout		62,403	60.52	
BJP hold		Swing		

== See also ==
- First Legislative Assembly of Delhi
- Second Legislative Assembly of Delhi
- Third Legislative Assembly of Delhi
- Fourth Legislative Assembly of Delhi
- Fifth Legislative Assembly of Delhi
- Sixth Legislative Assembly of Delhi
