= Ajesh Yadav =

Indian politician

Member of the Delhi Legislative Assembly
- In office 10 February 2015 – 8 February 2025
- Preceded by: Devender Yadav
- Succeeded by: Aahir Deepak Chaudharyy
- Constituency: Badli

Personal details
- Born: 15 July 1967 (age 59) New Delhi, India
- Citizenship: Indian
- Party: Aam Aadmi Party
- Other political affiliations: Bahujan Samaj Party
- Spouse: Asha Yadav
- Parent(s): Hari Ram Singh (father),(mother)
- Education: Delhi University
- Profession: Businessperson, politician

Ajesh Yadav is an Indian politician and member of the Sixth Legislative Assembly of Delhi. He is a member of the Aam Aadmi Party and formerly represented Badli (Assembly constituency) of Delhi.

== Early life and education ==
Ajesh Yadav was born in Delhi in 1967. He attended Delhi University and attained a Bachelor of Arts degree. He was a businessperson prior to entering politics.

== Political career ==
Ajesh Yadav has been a MLA for one term. In 2008 he contested Fifth Legislative Assembly of Delhi elections as a candidate of Bahujan Samaj Party from Badli (Delhi Assembly constituency). He is currently a member of the Aam Aadmi Party and represented the Badli (Delhi Assembly constituency).

== Member of Legislative Assembly ==
In 2015 he was elected to the Sixth Legislative Assembly of Delhi. In 2020 he was elected to the Seventh Legislative Assembly of Delhi. He lost in 2025.

== Member of Legislative Assembly (2020 - 2025) ==
From 2020 till 2025, he was an elected member of the 7th Delhi Assembly.

Committee assignments of Delhi Legislative Assembly

- Member (2022-2023), Committee on Government Undertakings

== Electoral performance ==
=== 2025 ===
Delhi Assembly elections, 2025: Badli
Party	Candidate	Votes	%	±%
BJP	Aahir Deepak Chaudharyy	61,192	40.66	▲11.82
AAP	Ajesh Yadav	46,029	30.58	▼19.07
INC	Devender Yadav	41,071	27.29	▲7.64
NOTA	None of the above	692	0.45	▲0.01
Majority		15,163	10.08	
Turnout		1,50,495	62.53	▼1.08
BJP gain from AAP		Swing		

Delhi Assembly elections, 2008: Badli
Party	Candidate	Votes	%	±%
INC	Devender Yadav	39,215	39.86	−0.70
BSP	Ajesh Yadav	25,611	26.03	+22.69
BJP	Rajesh Yadav	18,743	19.05	−34.28
NCP	Jitender Kumar	11,242	11.43	
RJD	Parwinder Singh	1,165	1.18	+0.74
Majority		13,604	13.83	+1.06
Turnout		98,381	57.1	+9.22
INC hold		Swing	-0.70	

Delhi Assembly elections, 2015: Badli
Party	Candidate	Votes	%	±%
AAP	Ajesh Yadav	72,795	51.14	▲25.63
INC	Devender Yadav	37,419	26.29	▼18.31
BJP	Rajesh Yadav	28,238	19.84	▼5.77
BSP	Dr. Mohd. Jawed Habib	685	0.48	▼1.26
NOTA	None of the above	713	0.50	▼0.30
Majority		35,376	24.85	▲5.89
Turnout		1,42,351	63.76	
AAP gain from INC		Swing	▲25.63	

Delhi Assembly elections, 2020: Badli
Party	Candidate	Votes	%	±%
AAP	Ajesh Yadav	69,427	49.65	▼1.49
BJP	Vijay Kumar Bhagat	40,333	28.84	▲9.00
INC	Devender Yadav	27,483	19.65	▼6.64
BSP	Laxman Kumar	579	0.41	▼0.07
NOTA	None of the above	609	0.44	▼0.06
Majority		29,094	20.81	▼4.04
Turnout		1,39,913	63.61	▼0.15
AAP hold		Swing	▼1.49	

=== 2025 ===
Delhi Assembly elections, 2025: Badli
Party	Candidate	Votes	%	±%
BJP	Aahir Deepak Chaudharyy	61,192	40.66	▲11.82
AAP	Ajesh Yadav	46,029	30.58	▼19.07
INC	Devender Yadav	41,071	27.29	▲7.64
NOTA	None of the above	692	0.45	▲0.01
Majority		15,163	10.08	
Turnout		1,50,495	62.53	▼1.08
BJP gain from AAP		Swing		

== See also ==
- Sixth Legislative Assembly of Delhi
- Aam Aadmi Party

State Legislative Assembly
Preceded by ?	Member of the Delhi Legislative Assembly from Badli, Delhi Assembly constituency 2020–	Incumbent
