= Pawan Sharma =

Indian politician (born 1959)

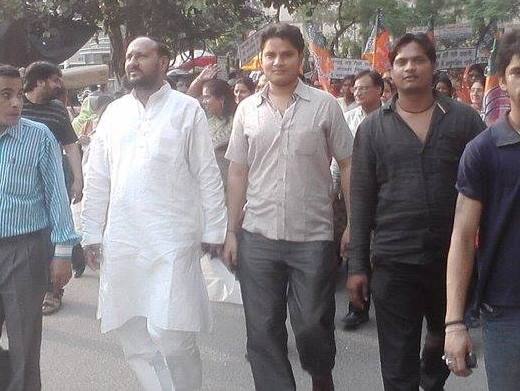

Member of the Delhi Legislative Assembly for Uttam Nagar
- Incumbent
- Assumed office 2025
- In office 2013–2014
- Preceded by: Mukesh Sharma
- Succeeded by: Naresh Balyan

Personal details
- Party: Bharatiya Janata Party

Pawan Sharma (born in 1959) is a senior leader of Bharatiya Janata Party and a currently serves as member of the Delhi Legislative Assembly. He was elected to the Delhi Assembly in 2013 and 2025 from Uttam Nagar.
