= Neeraj Basoya =

Indian politician

Member of the Delhi Legislative Assembly for Kasturba Nagar
- Incumbent
- Assumed office 8 February 2025
- Preceded by: Madan Lal
- In office 2008–2013
- Preceded by: Sushil Choudhary
- Succeeded by: Madan Lal

Personal details
- Born: 1 January 1976 (age 50) Delhi, India
- Party: Bharatiya Janata Party
- Other political affiliations: Indian National Congress (till 2024)

Neeraj Basoya (born 1 January 1976) is an Indian politician from Bharatiya Janata Party. He was elected as an MLA to the Delhi Legislative Assembly from Kasturba Nagar in Delhi in 2008 and 2025.

In May 2024, he, along with Arvinder Singh Lovely, Naseeb Singh and other former Indian National Congress MLAs, resigned from the Congress party and joined the BJP, citing their dissatisfaction over the Congress alliance with the Aam Aadmi Party.

== Electoral performance ==
Delhi Assembly elections, 2013: Kasturba Nagar
Party	Candidate	Votes	%	±%
AAP	Madan Lal	33,609	38.03	
BJP	Shikha Roy	28,935	32.74	−8.39
INC	Neeraj Basoya	24,227	27.41	−16.99
NOTA	None of the above	607	0.69	
Majority		4,674	5.29	+2.02
Turnout		88,500	65.64	
AAP gain from INC		Swing		

Delhi Assembly elections, 2015: Kasturba Nagar
Party	Candidate	Votes	%	±%
AAP	Madan Lal	50,766	53.51	+15.48
BJP	Ravinder Choudhary	34,870	35.41	+2.67
INC	Neeraj Basoya	11,233	11.40	−16.01
BSP	Ramesh Kumar	317	0.32	−0.22
NOTA	None of the above	423	0.42	−0.27
Majority		15,896	18.10	+12.81
Turnout		98,535	66.56	
AAP hold		Swing	+15.48	

=== 2025 ===
Delhi Assembly elections, 2025: Kasturba Nagar
Party	Candidate	Votes	%	±%
BJP	Neeraj Basoya	38,067	45.06	+8.06
INC	Abhishek Dutt	27,019	31.98	+10.56
AAP	Ramesh Pehalwan	18,617	22.04	−18.41
NOTA	None of the above	472	0.56	+0.06
Majority		11,048	13.08	+9.62
Turnout		84,483	54.10	−5.77
BJP gain from AAP		Swing	+8.06	
