= Raghuvinder Shokeen =

Indian politician

Cabinet Minister
- In office 13 December 2024 – 9 February 2025

Member of Delhi Legislative Assembly
- In office February 2020 – 2025
- Preceded by: Manoj Kumar Shokeen
- Succeeded by: Manoj Kumar Shokeen
- Constituency: Nangloi Jat

Personal details
- Party: Aam Aadmi Party

Raghuvinder Singh Shokeen is an Indian politician and is a former member of the Sixth Legislative Assembly of Delhi. He lost to Manoj Kumar Shokeen of Bharatiya Janata Party by 26,251 votes in Delhi Legislative Assembly Elections held in February 2025. He is a member of the Aam Aadmi Party and formerly represented Nangloi Jat (Assembly constituency) of Delhi. Shokeen has served as a councillor for two terms.

== Early life and education ==
He is a graduate in engineering (1983–88) from NIT (erstwhile REC) Kurukshetra. He used to be active in politics during college days.

== Electoral performance ==
=== 2025 ===
Delhi Assembly elections, 2025
Party	Candidate	Votes	%	±%
BJP	Manoj Kumar Shokeen	75,272	47.24	▲5.71
AAP	Raghuvinder Shokeen	49,021	30.76	▼18.45
INC	Rohit Chaudhary	32,028	20.10	▲13.65
NOTA	None of the above	924	0.3	
Majority		26,251	16.6	▲8.92
Turnout		1,58,398	59.3	▲2.5
BJP gain from AAP		Swing		

Delhi Assembly elections, 2020: Nangloi Jat
Party	Candidate	Votes	%	±%
AAP	Raghuvinder Shokeen	74,444	49.21	−5.43
BJP	Suman Lata	62,820	41.53	+11.19
INC	Mandeep Singh	9,761	6.45	−3.89
BSP	Sandeep	1,438	0.95	+0.18
NOTA	None of the above	862	0.57	+0.23
Majority		11,624	7.68	−16.62
Turnout		1,51,272	56.80	−6.90
AAP hold		Swing	-5.43	

== Posts held ==
#	From	To	Position	Comments
01	2015	2025	Member, Sixth Legislative Assembly of Delhi	

== See also ==
- Sixth Legislative Assembly of Delhi
- Delhi Legislative Assembly
- Government of India
- Politics of India
- Aam Aadmi Party

State Legislative Assembly
Preceded by ?	Member of the Delhi Legislative Assembly from Nangloi Jat Assembly constituency 2020– 2025	Succeeded by Manoj Kumar Shokeen
