= Rohtas Nagar Assembly constituency =

Constituency of the Delhi legislative assembly in India

Coordinates: 28.681°N 77.285°E

Rohtas Nagar
- Constituency No. 64 for the Delhi Legislative Assembly

Constituency details
- Country: India
- Region: North India
- State: Delhi
- District: North East Delhi
- Established: 1993
- Reservation: None

Member of Legislative Assembly
- 8th Delhi Legislative Assembly
- Incumbent Jitender Mahajan
- Party: Bharatiya Janata Party
- Elected year: 2025

Rohtas Nagar Assembly constituency is one of the seventy Delhi assembly constituencies of Delhi in northern India. Rohtas Nagar assembly constituency is a part of North East Delhi (Lok Sabha constituency).

== Members of Legislative Assembly ==
Year	Name	Party
1993	Alok Kumar	Bharatiya Janata Party
1998	Radhe Shyam Khanna	Indian National Congress
2003	Ram Babu Sharma	Indian National Congress
2008	Ram Babu Sharma	Indian National Congress
2009 By-election	Vipin Sharma	Indian National Congress
2013	Jitender Mahajan	Bharatiya Janata Party
2015	Sarita Singh	Aam Aadmi Party
2020	Jitender Mahajan	Bharatiya Janata Party
2025	Jitender Mahajan	Bharatiya Janata Party

== Election results ==
=== 2025 ===
Delhi Assembly elections, 2025: Rohtas Nagar
Party	Candidate	Votes	%	±%
BJP	Jitender Mahajan	82896	57.44	
AAP	Sarita Singh	54994	38.11	
INC	Suresh Vati	3639	2.52	
ASP(KR)	Surendra Singh Vishvkarma	174		
NOTA	None of the above	630	0.44	
Majority		27902		
Turnout		144317		
		Swing		

=== 2020 ===
Delhi Assembly elections, 2020: Rohtas Nagar
Party	Candidate	Votes	%	±%
BJP	Jitender Mahajan	73,873	51.94	+11.80
AAP	Sarita Singh	60,632	42.63	−3.33
INC	Vipin Sharma	5,572	3.92	−7.48
BSP	Trivender	619	0.44	−1.08
NOTA	None of the above	513	0.36	+0.06
Majority		13,241	9.31	+3.47
Turnout		1,43,083	67.83	−2.86
BJP gain from AAP		Swing	+11.80	

=== 2015 ===
Delhi Assembly elections, 2015: Rohtas Nagar
Party	Candidate	Votes	%	±%
AAP	Sarita Singh	62,209	45.96	+17.00
BJP	Jitender Mahajan	54,335	40.14	−1.20
INC	Vipin Sharma	15,448	11.41	−15.22
BSP	Praveen Bansal	2,115	1.56	−0.16
SS	Rajeev Sohi	65	0.04	N/A
NOTA	None of the above	409	0.30	−0.21
Majority		7,874	5.84	−6.53
Turnout		1,35,439	70.69	
AAP gain from BJP		Swing	+16.40	

=== 2013 ===
Delhi Assembly elections, 2013: Rohtas Nagar
Party	Candidate	Votes	%	±%
BJP	Jitender Kumar	49,916	41.34	+7.27
AAP	Mukesh Hooda	34,973	28.96	
INC	Vipin Sharma	32,156	26.63	−30.83
BSP	Daya Shankar Bhardwaj	2,076	1.72	−5.42
LJP	Naushad	295	0.24	
Independent	Mohd Arif	289	0.24	
AVP	Bhudev Sharma	173	0.14	
Independent	Jugal Kishore Sharma	167	0.14	
Independent	Mohammad Umar	92	0.08	
NOTA	None	619	0.51	
Majority		14,943	12.37	−10.92
Turnout		120,896	68.92	
BJP gain from INC		Swing	+7.27	

=== 2009 By Election results ===
Delhi Legislative Assembly by election, 2009: Rohtas Nagar
Party	Candidate	Votes	%	±%
INC	Vipin Sharma	57,848	57.46	+11.04
BJP	Divya Jayaswal	34,299	34.07	+1.08
BSP	Jai Chand Sharma	7,191	7.14	−9.91
Independent	Sanjay Gupta	350	0.35	
SP	Subhash Mishra	346	0.34	−0.15
IJP	Rakesh Gupta	339	0.34	
Independent	Yudhister Kr Sharma	179	0.18	
ABAC	Vinod Kr Gupta	119	0.12	
Majority		23,549	23.29	+9.86
Turnout		100,671	59.30	−1.80
INC hold		Swing	+11.04	

=== 2008 ===
Delhi Assembly elections, 2008: Rohtas Nagar
Party	Candidate	Votes	%	±%
INC	Ram Babu Sharma	45,802	46.42	−2.28
BJP	Alok Kumar	32,559	32.99	−5.34
BSP	Lokesh Dixit	16,823	17.05	+6.53
Independent	Laxman Dass	1,651	1.67	
SP	Jitendra Panchal	482	0.49	+0.19
Independent	Raju Soni	365	0.37	
RWS	Gulshan Kumar Ratra	266	0.27	
RKAP	R L Verma	209	0.21	
SS	Rajeev Kumar	151	0.15	−0.44
AGRJP	Dhayan Pal Singh	137	0.14	
RLD	Parveen Kumar	118	0.12	
LJP	Pardeep Jain	116	0.12	
Majority		13,243	13.43	+3.06
Turnout		98,679	61.1	+0.66
INC hold		Swing	-2.28	

=== 2003 ===
Delhi Assembly elections, 2003: Rohtas Nagar
Party	Candidate	Votes	%	±%
INC	Ram Babu Sharma	29,866	48.70	+5.51
BJP	Alok Kumar	23,523	38.33	−4.54
BSP	Surender	6,457	10.52	−3.88
SS	Dhannjay	360	0.59	+0.16
IPP	Dr Puneet Dhawan	276	0.45	
Independent	Neeraj Dhamija	216	0.35	
SP	Amit Kumar	187	0.30	
Independent	Chaman Lal	151	0.25	
CPI(ML)L	Ram Abhilash	120	0.20	
ABAC	Vinod Kumar Gupta	90	0.15	
JD(U)	Narender Kumar	64	0.10	
RMP	Abha Nishant	36	0.06	
Majority		6,363	10.37	+10.05
Turnout		61,366	60.44	+13.18
INC hold		Swing	+5.51	

=== 1998 ===
Delhi Assembly elections, 1998: Rohtas Nagar
Party	Candidate	Votes	%	±%
INC	Radhey Shyam Khanna	22,746	43.19	+11.21
BJP	Alok Kumar	22,579	42.87	−4.25
BSP	Prem Prakash	3,497	6.64	+4.52
Independent	Janardhan	1,465	2.78	
UKD	Damodar Joshi	741	1.41	
Independent	Panna Lal Sagar	612	1.16	
LKD	Smt Tarun Choudhary	352	0.67	
ABLTC	Surender Singh	233	0.44	
SS	Abhimanyu	225	0.43	−0.07
RJD	Kali Ram Tomar	102	0.19	
ABMAD	Munishwari	67	0.13	
Independent	Ram Narian Goel	50	0.09	
Majority		167	0.32	−14.82
Turnout		52,669	47.26	−16.97
INC gain from BJP		Swing	+11.21	

=== 1993 ===
Delhi Assembly elections, 1993: Rohtas Nagar
Party	Candidate	Votes	%	±%
BJP	Alok Kumar	24,324	47.12	
INC	Babu Krishan Lal	16,508	31.98	
JD	Ratan	8,148	15.78	
BSP	Mahesh Chand	1,095	2.12	
SS	Dhananjay Kumar	256	0.50	
BKD	Devi Singh	240	0.46	
Doordarshi Party	Kamlesh	152	0.29	
Independent	Rajender Singh	121	0.23	
JP	Sudesh	118	0.23	
Independent	Satish Kumar	111	0.22	
DBP	Shri Pal Sharma	103	0.20	
Independent	Murari Lal	103	0.20	
Independent	J P Gupta	95	0.18	
Independent	Bholanath Bhargawa	76	0.15	
ABHM	Amit	60	0.12	
Independent	Chander Sharma	31	0.06	
Independent	Ramsewak Sharma	22	0.04	
BMD	Ajit Kumar	22	0.04	
Independent	Raj Kumar	14	0.03	
Independent	Nannae	12	0.02	
Independent	Som Inder Prakash	10	0.02	
Majority		7,816	15.14	
Turnout		51,621	64.23	
BJP win (new seat)				
