= Mohinder Goyal =

Indian politician

Member of the Delhi Legislative Assembly for Rithala
- In office Feb 2015 – Feb 2025
- Preceded by: Kulwant Rana
- Succeeded by: Kulwant Rana

Personal details
- Born: 6 November 1963 (age 62) Kaithal
- Party: Aam Aadmi Party
- Parent: Rati Ram Goyal (father)
- Education: Hindu School, Kaithal
- Profession: Politician & businessperson

Mohinder Goyal is an Indian politician and a member of the Sixth Legislative Assembly of Delhi in India. He represented the Rithala constituency of New Delhi and is a member of the Aam Aadmi Party political party.

== Early life and education ==
Mohinder Goyal was born in Kaithal. He attended the Hindu School in Kaithal and is educated till tenth grade.

== Political career ==
Mohinder Goyal has been a MLA for one term. He represented the Rithala constituency and is a member of the Aam Aadmi Party political party.

== Member of the Legislative Assembly ==
Between 2015-2020 he is the Member of the Sixth Legislative Assembly of Delhi. Between 2020-2025 he was the Member of the Seventh Legislative Assembly of Delhi.

== Electoral performance ==
Delhi Assembly election, 2015: Rithala
Party	Candidate	Votes	%	±%
AAP	Mohinder Goyal	93,470	56.63	+23.24
BJP	Kulwant Rana	64,219	38.91	−12.39
INC	Jagdish Yadav	5,367	3.25	−9.31
BSP	Pawan Kaushik	542	0.33	−0.83
NOTA	None	705	0.43	−0.28
Majority		29,251	17.72	−0.19
Turnout		1,65,152	66.46	
AAP gain from BJP		Swing	+23.24	

Delhi Assembly elections, 2020: Rithala
Party	Candidate	Votes	%	±%
AAP	Mohinder Goyal	87,940	52.63	−4.00
BJP	Manish Chaudhary	74,067	44.33	+5.42
INC	Pradeep Kumar Pandey	2,651	1.59	−1.66
NOTA	None of the above	824	0.49	+0.06
BSP	Rajesh Kumar	491	0.29	−0.04
Majority		13,873	8.30	−9.42
Turnout		1,67,235	59.80	−6.63
AAP hold		Swing	-4.00	

=== 2025 ===
Delhi Assembly election 2025, Rithala
Party	Candidate	Votes	%	±%
BJP	Kulwant Rana	104,371	55.76	▲11.43
AAP	Mohinder Goyal	74,755	39.94	▼12.69
INC	Sushant Mishra	5,258	2.81	▲1.22
NOTA	None of the above	1,235	0.66	
Majority		29,616	15.9	▲7.6
Turnout		1,85,929	58.1	▼1.7
BJP hold		Swing		

== See also ==
- Delhi Legislative Assembly
- Rithala (Delhi Assembly constituency)
- Sixth Legislative Assembly of Delhi
- Delhi Legislative Assembly
- Politics of India
- Aam Aadmi Party

State Legislative Assembly
Preceded by ?	Member of the Delhi Legislative Assembly from Rithala Assembly constituency 2020–	Incumbent
