= Uttam Nagar Assembly constituency =

Constituency of the Delhi legislative assembly in India

Coordinates: 28.619°N 77.055°E

Uttam Nagar
- Constituency No. 32 for the Delhi Legislative Assembly

Constituency details
- Country: India
- Region: North India
- State: Delhi
- District: West Delhi
- Established: 2008
- Reservation: None

Member of Legislative Assembly
- 8th Delhi Legislative Assembly
- Incumbent Pawan Sharma
- Party: Bharatiya Janata Party
- Elected year: 2025

Uttam Nagar Assembly constituency is one of the 70 Delhi Legislative Assembly constituencies of the National Capital Territory in northern India.

== Overview ==
Present geographical structure of Uttam Nagar constituency came into existence in 2008 as a part of the implementation of the recommendations of the Delimitation Commission of India constituted in 2002. Uttam Nagar is part of West Delhi Lok Sabha constituency along with nine other Assembly segments, namely, Madipur, Rajouri Garden, Hari Nagar, Tilak Nagar, Janakpuri, Vikaspuri, Dwarka, Matiala and Najafgarh.

== Members of the Legislative Assembly ==
Election	Name	Party
2008	Mukesh Sharma	Indian National Congress
2013	Pawan Sharma	Bharatiya Janata Party
2015	Naresh Balyan	Aam Aadmi Party
2020	Naresh Balyan	Aam Aadmi Party
2025	Pawan Sharma	Bharatiya Janata Party

== Election results ==
=== 2025 ===
Delhi Assembly elections, 2025: Uttam Nagar
Party	Candidate	Votes	%	±%
BJP	Pawan Sharma	103,613	52.8	+9.05
AAP	Pooja Naresh Balyan	73,873	37.7	−16.87
INC	Mukesh Sharma	15,565	7.9	
NOTA	None of the above	1,217	0.4	
Majority		29,740	15.3	
Turnout		1,94,876	61.9	−
BJP hold		Swing	BJP	

=== 2020 ===
Delhi Assembly elections, 2020: Uttam Nagar
Party	Candidate	Votes	%	±%
AAP	Naresh Balyan	99,622	54.57	+2.58
BJP	Krishan Gahlot	79,863	43.75	+10.17
RJD	Shakti Kumar Bishnoi	377	0.21	New
NOTA	None of the above	838	0.46	+0.05
Majority		19,759	10.82	−7.60
Turnout		1,82,606	64.12	−7.02
AAP hold		Swing	+2.58	

=== 2015 ===
Delhi Assembly elections, 2015: Uttam Nagar
Party	Candidate	Votes	%	±%
AAP	Naresh Balyan	85,881	51.99	+26.71
BJP	Pawan Sharma	55,462	33.58	−2.80
INC	Mukesh Sharma	20,703	12.53	−19.08
BSP	Abdul Hamid Barshid	884	0.54	−0.68
NOTA	None	672	0.41	−0.27
Majority		30,419	18.42	+13.65
Turnout		1,65,231	71.14	
AAP gain from BJP		Swing	+26.71	

=== 2013 ===
Delhi Assembly elections, 2013: Uttam Nagar
Party	Candidate	Votes	%	±%
BJP	Pawan Sharma	48,377	36.38	−2.58
INC	Mukesh Sharma	42,031	31.61	−14.42
AAP	Desh Raj Raghav	33,619	25.28	
Independent	Shyam Babu Gupta	5,272	3.96	
BSP	Raja Ram	1,626	1.22	−3.77
None of the Above	None of the Above	1,041	0.78	
Majority		6,346	4.77	−2.30
Turnout		1,33,034	69.48	
BJP gain from INC		Swing	-2.58	

=== 2008 ===
Delhi Assembly elections, 2008: Uttam Nagar
Party	Candidate	Votes	%	±%
INC	Mukesh Sharma	46,765	46.03	
BJP	Pawan Sharma	39,582	38.96	
NCP	Rajender Bhardwaj	8,064	7.94	
BSP	Om Prakash Jain	5,071	4.99	
Independent	Raj Bala	524	0.52	
Independent	Ramesh Kumar Jain	386	0.38	
Independent	Naveen Kumar	243	0.24	
SP	M R Sharma	205	0.20	
IJP	Prem Chand Prajapati	194	0.19	
Independent	Ziley Singh	145	0.14	
RTKP	Kishan Lal Verma	142	0.14	
LJP	Sita Sharma	109	0.11	
Independent	Om Bir	94	0.09	
BPC	Shobha Kaushik	78	0.08	
Majority		7,183	7.07	
Turnout		101,602	62.4	
INC win (new seat)				
