= Mahinder Yadav =

Indian politician (born 1963)

Member of the Delhi Legislative Assembly for Vikaspuri
- In office Feb 2020 – Feb 2025
- Preceded by: Nand Kishore
- Succeeded by: Pankaj Kumar Singh

Personal details
- Party: Aam Aadmi Party

Mahinder Yadav (born 5 May 1963), also spelled as Mahendra Yadav, is an Indian politician from the Aam Aadmi Party (AAP). He was a member of the Sixth Legislative Assembly of Delhi, representing Vikaspuri assembly constituency as MLA from December 2014 till 2025.

== Personal life ==
Mahinder Yadav was born on 5 May 1963 in New Delhi. His father's name is Mewa Ram Yadav. Mahinder Yadav has passed 10th standard (matriculate) from the CBSE board in 1980. He is a social worker. He is a businessman and a retail trader and supplier of building materials. Mahinder Yadav is married to Raj Yadav and has three daughters. His wife Raj is self-employed. He is a resident of Hastsal Village in Uttam Nagar area of New Delhi.

== Politics ==
He was an Independent councillor from Ward No. 124 of the Municipal Corporation of Delhi (MCD) from April, 2012 to December, 2013. He was Chairman of Khel Kud & Protsahan Committee in the South Delhi Municipal Corporation (S.D.M.C.) between 2012 and 2013.

In 2012, Yadav switched to the Aam Aadmi Party (AAP). Yadav contested Vikaspuri assembly constituency on an AAP ticket in the December 2013 Delhi Legislative Assembly elections. He polled 62,032 votes and defeated his nearest rival Krishan Gahlot of the BJP by 405 votes. This was the second lowest victory margin in the elections. He also defeated sitting MLA Nand Kishore from the Indian National Congress (INC), who came in third in the contest. He was thus member of the Fifth Legislative Assembly of Delhi between December 2013 and January 2015.

Yadav won the Vikaspuri constituency in the 2015 Delhi Legislative Assembly elections too. He secured 1,32,437 votes, defeating his nearest rival Sanjay Singh of the BJP by the margin of 77,665 votes. This was the highest margin of victory in the elections.

And In May 2025, Mahinder Yadav was appointed as the Aam Aadmi Party's ( AAP) in-charge for Uttarakhand as part of the party's organisational appointments across several state. Anuj Pal was appointed as the state's co-in-charge.

== Electoral performance ==
=== 2025 ===
Delhi Assembly elections, 2025: Vikaspuri
Party	Candidate	Votes	%	±%
BJP	Pankaj Kumar Singh	135,564	49.54	▲11.16
AAP	Mahinder Yadav	122,688	44.83	▼11.12
INC	Jitender Solanki	8,465	3.1	▼0.38
NOTA	None of the above	1,460	0.3	
Majority		12,876	4.7	▼12.87
Turnout		2,72,188	58.9	▼0.59
BJP gain from AAP		Swing		

Delhi Assembly elections, 2020: Vikaspuri
Party	Candidate	Votes	%	±%
AAP	Mahinder Yadav	133,898	55.95	−6.58
BJP	Sanjay Singh	91,840	38.38	+12.52
INC	Mukesh Sharma	8,319	3.48	−5.75
NOTA	None of the above	1,034	0.43	
Majority		42,058	17.57	−19.10
Turnout		2,39,494	59.49	−5.66
AAP hold		Swing	-6.58	

State Legislative Assembly
Preceded by ?	Member of the Delhi Legislative Assembly from Vikaspuri Assembly constituency 2020– 2025	Succeeded by Pankaj Kumar Singh
