= Vikaspuri Assembly constituency =

Constituency of the Delhi legislative assembly in India

Coordinates: 28.641°N 77.073°E

Vikaspuri
- Constituency No. 31 for the Delhi Legislative Assembly

Constituency details
- Country: India
- Region: North India
- State: Delhi
- District: West Delhi
- Established: 2008
- Reservation: None

Member of Legislative Assembly
- 8th Delhi Legislative Assembly
- Incumbent Pankaj Kumar Singh
- Party: Bharatiya Janata Party
- Elected year: 2025

Vikaspuri Assembly constituency is one of the 70 Delhi Legislative Assembly constituencies of the National Capital Territory in India.

== Overview ==
Present geographical structure of Vikaspuri constituency came into existence in 2008 (Constituency didn't exist before 2008) as a part of the implementation of the recommendations of the Delimitation Commission of India constituted in 2002. Vikaspuri is part of West Delhi Lok Sabha constituency along with nine other Assembly segments, namely, Uttam Nagar, Rajouri Garden, Hari Nagar, Tilak Nagar, Janakpuri, Matiala, Dwarka, Madipur and Najafgarh.

== Members of Legislative Assembly ==
Election	Name	Party
2008	Nand Kishore	Indian National Congress
2013	Mahinder Yadav	Aam Aadmi Party
2015	Mahinder Yadav	Aam Aadmi Party
2020	Mahinder Yadav	Aam Aadmi Party
2025	Pankaj Kumar Singh	Bharatiya Janata Party

== Election results ==
=== 2025 ===
Delhi Assembly elections, 2025: Vikaspuri
Party	Candidate	Votes	%	±%
BJP	Pankaj Kumar Singh	135,564	49.54	▲11.16
AAP	Mahinder Yadav	122,688	44.83	▼11.12
INC	Jitendra Solanki	8,465	3.1	▼0.38
NOTA	None of the above	1,460	0.3	
Majority		12,876	4.7	▼12.87
Turnout		2,72,188	58.9	▼0.59
BJP gain from AAP		Swing		

=== 2020 ===
Delhi Assembly elections, 2020: Vikaspuri
Party	Candidate	Votes	%	±%
AAP	Mahinder Yadav	133,898	55.95	−6.58
BJP	Sanjay Singh	91,840	38.38	+12.52
INC	Mukesh Sharma	8,319	3.48	−5.75
NOTA	None of the above	1,034	0.43	
Majority		42,058	17.57	−19.10
Turnout		2,39,494	59.49	−5.66
AAP hold		Swing	-6.58	

=== 2015 ===
Delhi Assembly elections, 2015: Vikaspuri
Party	Candidate	Votes	%	±%
AAP	Mahinder Yadav	132,437	62.53	+28.20
BJP	Sanjay Singh	54,772	25.86	−8.24
INC	Nand Kishore	19,540	9.23	−16.96
BSP	Radhey Sham Tyagi	4,169	1.01	−1.30
Majority		77,665	36.67	+36.45
Turnout		2,11,906	65.15	
AAP hold		Swing	+28.20	

=== 2013 ===
Delhi Assembly elections, 2013: Vikaspuri
Party	Candidate	Votes	%	±%
AAP	Mahinder Yadav	62,030	34.33	
BJP	Krishan Gahlot	61,627	34.10	−0.17
INC	Nand Kishore	47,331	26.19	−8.77
BSP	Sanjay Kumar	4,169	2.31	−9.95
Independent	Jitender Dahiya	1,267	0.70	
JD(U)	Naresh Kumar	1,191	0.66	
SS	Sangeeta Chauhan	634	0.35	
Independent	Suresh Kumar	523	0.29	
Independent	Radhey Shyam Singh	295	0.16	
Independent	Mohd Naeem	218	0.12	
NOTA	None	1,426	0.79	
Majority		405	0.22	−0.47
Turnout		180,844	63.23	
AAP gain from INC		Swing		

=== 2008 ===
Delhi Assembly elections, 2008: Vikaspuri
Party	Candidate	Votes	%	±%
INC	Nand Kishore	47,819	34.96	
BJP	Krishan Gahlot	46,876	34.27	
BSP	Ashok Kumar Lakra	16,765	12.26	
Independent	Sanjay Singh	9,634	7.04	
Independent	Ravinder Singh	7,158	5.23	
NCP	Brij Bhushan	2,687	1.96	
Independent	Shiv Prasad	1,045	0.76	
SP	Itwari	1,035	0.76	
Independent	Sunil Kumar	780	0.57	
Independent	Prem Verma	537	0.39	
Independent	Sushil Kumar Sharma	385	0.28	
Independent	Virender Kumar	383	0.28	
Independent	Satish Kumar	291	0.21	
Independent	Vinod Kumar	271	0.20	
Independent	Bishan Singh	238	0.17	
BJSH	Mahender Kumar	205	0.15	
Independent	Dilbag Singh	186	0.14	
Independent	Inderjeet Verma	184	0.13	
ABHM	Bhopal Singh	148	0.11	
RSMD	Jitender Singh	147	0.11	
Majority		943	0.69	
Turnout		136,774	55.6	
INC win (new seat)				
