= Nangloi Jat Assembly constituency =

Constituency of the Delhi legislative assembly in India

Coordinates: 28.67°N 77.06°E

Nangloi Jat
- Constituency No. 11 for the Delhi Legislative Assembly

Constituency details
- Country: India
- Region: North India
- State: Delhi
- District: North West Delhi
- Established: 1993
- Reservation: None

Member of Legislative Assembly
- 8th Delhi Legislative Assembly
- Incumbent Manoj Kumar Shokeen
- Party: Bharatiya Janata party
- Elected year: 2025

Nangloi Jat Assembly constituency is one of the seventy Delhi assembly constituencies of Delhi in northern India. Nangloi Jat assembly constituency is a part of North West Delhi (Lok Sabha constituency).

== Members of Legislative Assembly ==
Year	Member	Party
1952	Brahm Prakash Yadav	Indian National Congress
1955-93 : Constituency did not exist
1993	Devender Singh Shokeen	Bharatiya Janata Party
1998	Prem Chand	Indian National Congress
2003	Bijender Singh Shokeen	Indian National Congress
2008	Bijender Singh Shokeen	Indian National Congress
2013	Manoj Shokeen	Bharatiya Janata Party
2015	Raghuvinder Shokeen	Aam Aadmi Party
2020	Raghuvinder Shokeen	Aam Aadmi Party
2025	Manoj Shokeen	Bharatiya Janata Party

== Election results ==
=== 2025 ===
Delhi Assembly elections, 2025
Party	Candidate	Votes	%	±%
BJP	Manoj Kumar Shokeen	75,272	47.24	▲5.71
AAP	Raghuvinder Shokeen	49,021	30.76	▼18.45
INC	Rohit Chaudhary	32,028	20.10	▲13.65
NOTA	None of the above	924	0.3	
Majority		26,251	16.6	▲8.92
Turnout		1,58,398	59.3	▲2.5
BJP gain from AAP		Swing		

=== 2020 ===
Delhi Assembly elections, 2020: Nangloi Jat
Party	Candidate	Votes	%	±%
AAP	Raghuvinder Shokeen	74,444	49.21	−5.43
BJP	Suman Lata	62,820	41.53	+11.19
INC	Mandeep Singh	9,761	6.45	−3.89
BSP	Sandeep	1,438	0.95	+0.18
NOTA	None of the above	862	0.57	+0.23
Majority		11,624	7.68	−16.62
Turnout		1,51,272	56.80	−6.90
AAP hold		Swing	-5.43	

=== 2015 ===
Delhi Assembly elections, 2015: Nangloi Jat
Party	Candidate	Votes	%	±%
AAP	Raghuvinder Shokeen	83,259	54.64	+35.68
BJP	Manoj Kumar Shokeen	46,235	30.34	−11.98
INC	Dr.Bijender Singh	15,756	10.34	−23.86
Independent	Narender Bindal	3,323	2.18	
BSP	Kulwant Rai Bansal	1,173	0.77	−1.66
JD(U)	Sandeep Khatik	538	0.35	
NOTA	None	517	0.34	−0.52
Majority		37,024	24.30	+16.19
Turnout		1,52,495	63.75	
AAP gain from BJP		Swing	+35.68	

=== 2013 ===
Delhi Assembly elections, 2013: Nangloi Jat
Party	Candidate	Votes	%	±%
BJP	Manoj Kumar Shokeen	57,449	42.32	+10.20
INC	Dr.Bijender Singh	46,434	34.20	−16.45
AAP	Naveen Mehta	25,743	18.96	
BSP	Md. Saleem Saify	3,299	2.43	−11.88
Independent	Lal Dass	564	0.42	
NOTA	None	1,171	0.86	
Majority		11,015	8.11	−10.42
Turnout		1,36,009	61.64	
BJP gain from INC		Swing	+10.20	

=== 2008 ===
Delhi Assembly elections, 2008: Nangloi Jat
Party	Candidate	Votes	%	±%
INC	Bijender Singh	48,009	50.65	−2.10
BJP	Raj Singh	30,449	32.12	−10.57
BSP	Naresh Goel	13,568	14.31	
Independent	Sunil Kumar	657	0.69	
LJP	Uday Veer Singh	608	0.64	
Independent	Kuldeep Singh Yadav	445	0.47	
SP	Chhater Pal Rathore	284	0.30	−2.12
SS	Manish Gupta	235	0.25	
Independent	Kamal Singh	187	0.20	
Independent	Anuj	172	0.18	
JKNPP	Om Krishnan	170	0.18	
Majority		17,560	18.53	+8.47
Turnout		94,784	55.1	+0.67
INC hold		Swing	-2.10	

=== 2003 ===
Delhi Assembly elections, 2003: Nangloi Jat
Party	Candidate	Votes	%	±%
INC	Bijender Singh	42,158	52.75	+3.75
BJP	Devinder Singh	34,116	42.69	−3.75
SP	Mohinder Yadav	1,937	2.42	
Independent	Ramesh Kumar	478	0.60	
RPD	Om Bir Prasad Sharma	290	0.36	
IJP	Anil	283	0.35	
INLD	Dharam Singh	226	0.28	
JMM	Satya Rani Sharma	201	0.25	
LP(S)	Zalim	151	0.19	
AIFB	Dharmender	81	0.10	
Majority		8,042	10.06	+5.52
Turnout		79,921	54.43	+11.05
INC hold		Swing	+3.75	

=== 1998 ===
Delhi Assembly elections, 1998: Nangloi Jat
Party	Candidate	Votes	%	±%
INC	Prem Chand	800	49.00	+17.98
BJP	Devender Singh	27,706	44.46	−9.67
SAP	Panmeshwari	1,149	1.84	
BSP	Arwind Kataria	682	1.09	
JD	Jai Prakash	560	0.90	−9.49
Independent	Siraj Anwar	407	0.65	
Independent	Bilkis Bano	290	0.47	
BCVD	Ganga Ram	258	0.41	
Independent	Raj Kumar	195	0.31	
Independent	Mohan	178	0.29	
Independent	Surender Bhagat	152	0.24	
Independent	Satbir	113	0.18	
Independent	Mumtiyaz Ali	90	0.14	
Majority		2,827	4.54	−18.57
Turnout		62,313	43.38	−19.00
INC hold		Swing	+17.98	

=== 1993 ===
Delhi Assembly elections, 1993: Nangloi Jat
Party	Candidate	Votes	%	±%
BJP	Davinder Singh	28,427	54.13	
INC	Chaudhary Bharat Singh	16,287	31.02	
JD	Anil Yadav	5,457	10.39	
Independent	K D Sharma	691	1.32	
JP	Vijay Kr Rana	443	0.84	
SS	Suresh Kumar	318	0.61	
LKD	Mahesh Chander	255	0.49	
Independent	Panna Lal	177	0.34	
Independent	Bhoop Singh	106	0.20	
LPI	Virender	89	0.17	
Independent	Shiv Gopal	84	0.16	
Independent	Saxena	60	0.11	
Independent	Shankar Singh	54	0.10	
Independent	Karan Singh	35	0.07	
Independent	Swaran Singh	30	0.06	
Majority		12,140	23.11	
Turnout		52,513	62.38	
BJP hold		Swing		
