= Jitender Mahajan =

Indian politician (born 1969)

Member of the Delhi Legislative Assembly
- Incumbent
- Assumed office 12 February 2020
- Preceded by: Sarita Singh
- Constituency: Rohtas Nagar

Member of the Delhi Legislative Assembly
- In office 28 December 2013 – 12 February 2015
- Preceded by: Vipin Sharma
- Succeeded by: Sarita Singh
- Constituency: Rohtas Nagar

Personal details
- Born: 16 September 1969 (age 57)
- Party: Bharatiya Janata Party
- Occupation: Politician, social worker

Jitender Mahajan (born 16 September 1969) is an Indian politician from Delhi. He is a three time MLA representing the Rohtas Nagar Assembly constituency in Shahdara district. He is member of the Bharatiya Janata Party.

== Early life and education ==
Mahajan is from Rohtas Nagar, Shahdara district, Delhi. He is the son of Kewal Krishan. He completed his B.Com in 1993 at Shyam Lal College which is affiliated with Delhi University.

== Career ==
Mahajan won from the Rohtas Nagar Assembly constituency representing the Bharatiya Janata Party in the 2025 Delhi Legislative Assembly election. He first became an MLA from Rohtan Nagar winning the 2013 Delhi Legislative Assembly election. In 2025, he polled 82,896 votes and defeated his nearest rival, Sarita Singh of the Aam Aadmi Party, by a margin of 27,902 votes. Earlier, he lost the 2015 Delhi Legislative Assembly election to Sarita Singh but defeated her in the next election in 2020.

== Electoral performance ==
Delhi Assembly elections, 2020: Rohtas Nagar
Party	Candidate	Votes	%	±%
BJP	Jitender Mahajan	73,873	51.94	+11.80
AAP	Sarita Singh	60,632	42.63	−3.33
INC	Vipin Sharma	5,572	3.92	−7.48
BSP	Trivender	619	0.44	−1.08
NOTA	None of the above	513	0.36	+0.06
Majority		13,241	9.31	+3.47
Turnout		1,43,083	67.83	−2.86
BJP gain from AAP		Swing	+11.80	
