= Rithala Assembly constituency =

Legislative assembly seat in Delhi

Coordinates: 28.722°N 77.101°E

Rithala
- Constituency No. 6 for the Delhi Legislative Assembly

Constituency details
- Country: India
- Region: North India
- State: Delhi
- District: North West Delhi
- Established: 2008
- Reservation: None

Member of Legislative Assembly
- 8th Delhi Legislative Assembly
- Incumbent Kulwant Rana
- Party: Bharatiya Janata Party
- Elected year: 2025

Rithala Assembly constituency is one of the seventy Delhi assembly constituencies of Delhi in northern India. Rithala assembly constituency is a part of North West Delhi (Lok Sabha constituency). This constituency was created by reorganization by delimitation commission in 2008.

== Members of the Legislative Assembly ==
Year	Member	Party
2008	Kulwant Rana	Bharatiya Janata Party
2013	Kulwant Rana	Bharatiya Janata Party
2015	Mohinder Goyal	Aam Aadmi Party
2020	Mohinder Goyal	Aam Aadmi Party
2025	Kulwant Rana	Bharatiya Janata Party

== Election results ==
=== 2025 ===
Delhi Assembly election 2025, Rithala
Party	Candidate	Votes	%	±%
BJP	Kulwant Rana	104,371	55.76	▲11.43
AAP	Mohinder Goyal	74,755	39.94	▼12.69
INC	Sushant Mishra	5,258	2.81	▲1.22
NOTA	None of the above	1,235	0.66	
Majority		29,616	15.9	▲7.6
Turnout		1,85,929	58.1	▼1.7
BJP hold		Swing		

=== 2020 ===
Delhi Assembly elections, 2020: Rithala
Party	Candidate	Votes	%	±%
AAP	Mohinder Goyal	87,940	52.63	−4.00
BJP	Manish Chaudhary	74,067	44.33	+5.42
INC	Pradeep Kumar Pandey	2,651	1.59	−1.66
NOTA	None of the above	824	0.49	+0.06
BSP	Rajesh Kumar	491	0.29	−0.04
Majority		13,873	8.30	−9.42
Turnout		1,67,235	59.80	−6.63
AAP hold		Swing	-4.00	

=== 2015 ===
Delhi Assembly election, 2015: Rithala
Party	Candidate	Votes	%	±%
AAP	Mohinder Goyal	93,470	56.63	+23.24
BJP	Kulwant Rana	64,219	38.91	−12.39
INC	Jagdish Yadav	5,367	3.25	−9.31
BSP	Pawan Kaushik	542	0.33	−0.83
NOTA	None	705	0.43	−0.28
Majority		29,251	17.72	−0.19
Turnout		1,65,152	66.46	
AAP gain from BJP		Swing	+23.24	

=== 2013 ===
Delhi Assembly elections, 2013: Rithala
Party	Candidate	Votes	%	±%
BJP	Kulwant Rana	73,961	51.30	−4.26
AAP	Harish Awasthi	48,135	33.39	
INC	Indrajeet Singh	18,107	12.56	−20.30
BSP	Musaddi Lal Saini	1,671	1.16	−8.49
NOTA	None	1,023	0.71	
Majority		25,826	17.91	−6.79
Turnout		1,44,823	64.91	
BJP hold		Swing	-4.26	

=== 2008 ===
Delhi Assembly elections, 2008: Rithala
Party	Candidate	Votes	%	±%
BJP	Kulwant Rana	64,474	55.56	
INC	Shambhu Dayal Sharma	38,128	32.86	
BSP	Ranbir Singh Saroha	11,203	9.65	
Majority		26,346	24.70	
Turnout		116,044	63.4	
BJP win (new seat)				
