= Najafgarh Assembly constituency =

Legislative assembly seat in Delhi

Coordinates: 28.61°N 76.98°E

Najafgarh
- Constituency No. 35 for the Delhi Legislative Assembly

Constituency details
- Country: India
- Region: North India
- State: Delhi
- District: West Delhi
- Established: 1993
- Reservation: None

Member of Legislative Assembly
- 8th Delhi Legislative Assembly
- Incumbent Neelam Pahalwan
- Party: Bharatiya Janata Party
- Elected year: 2025

Najafgarh Assembly constituency is one of the 70 Delhi Legislative Assembly constituencies of the National Capital Territory in northern India.

== Overview ==
Present geographical structure of Najafgarh constituency came into existence in 2008 as a part of the implementation of the recommendations of the Delimitation Commission of India constituted in 2002. Najafgarh is part of West Delhi Lok Sabha constituency along with nine other Assembly segments, namely, Madipur, Rajouri Garden, Hari Nagar, Tilak Nagar, Janakpuri, Vikaspuri, Dwarka, Matiala and Uttam Nagar.

== Members of the Legislative Assembly ==
Election	Name	Party
1993	Suraj Parshad Paliwal	Independent
1998	Kanwal Yadav	Indian National Congress
2003	Ranbir Singh Kharb	Independent
2008	Bharat Singh Shokeen	Independent
2013	Ajeet Singh Kharkhari	Bharatiya Janata Party
2015	Kailash Gahlot	Aam Aadmi Party
2020	Kailash Gahlot	Aam Aadmi Party
2025	Neelam Pahalwan	Bharatiya Janata Party

== Election results ==
=== 2025 ===
Delhi Assembly elections, 2025: Najafgarh
Party	Candidate	Votes	%	±%
BJP	Neelam Pahalwan	101,708	56.40	▲10.35
AAP	Tarun Yadav	72,699	40.31	▼9.55
INC	Sushma Yadav	2,902	1.61	▲0.15
NOTA	None of the above	1,346	0.75	▲0.30
Majority		29,009	16.09	▲12.28
Turnout		1,78,655	64.13	▼0.80
BJP gain from AAP		Swing		

=== 2020 ===
Delhi Assembly elections, 2020: Najafgarh
Party	Candidate	Votes	%	±%
AAP	Kailash Gahlot	81,507	49.86	▲15.24
BJP	Ajeet Singh Kharkhari	75,276	46.05	▲21.48
INC	Sahab Singh	2,379	1.46	▼3.63
NOTA	None of the above	736	0.45	▲0.12
Majority		6,231	3.81	▲2.84
Turnout		1,63,517	64.93	−4.09
AAP hold		Swing	+15.24	

=== 2015 ===
Delhi Assembly elections, 2015: Najafgarh
Party	Candidate	Votes	%	±%
AAP	Kailash Gahlot	55,598	34.62	+18.77
INLD	Bharat Singh	54,043	33.65	+2.65
BJP	Ajeet Singh Kharkhari	39,462	24.57	−8.70
INC	Jai Kishan Sharma	8,180	5.09	−2.30
BSP	Ram Singh	1,108	4.60	−2.75
NOTA	None	535	0.33	
Majority		1,555	0.97	−5.82
Turnout		1,60,765	69.02	
AAP gain from BJP		Swing	+18.77	

=== 2013 ===
Delhi Assembly elections, 2013: Najafgarh
Party	Candidate	Votes	%	±%
BJP	Ajeet Singh Kharkhari	54,358	33.27	+24.53
INLD	Bharat Singh	44,590	31.00	
AAP	Mukesh Kumar Dagar	22,798	15.85	
INC	Bijander Dutt	10,633	7.39	−14.67
BSP	Ajit Singh	6,618	4.60	−13.15
Independent	Neelam	2,660	1.85	
NOTA	None	733	0.51	
Majority		9,768	6.79	−4.40
Turnout		1,44,153	67.96	
BJP gain from Independent		Swing	+24.53	

=== 2008 ===
Delhi Assembly elections, 2008: Najafgarh
Party	Candidate	Votes	%	±%
Independent	Bharat Singh	34,028	33.25	
INC	Kanwal Singh Yadav	22,575	22.06	−6.35
BSP	Bijander Dutt	18,164	17.75	+11.65
BJP	Rajesh Sharma	13,576	13.27	+4.65
Independent	Ranbir Singh Kharb	11,620	11.36	−35.54
Independent	Shyam Kumar	585	0.57	
Independent	Ramphal Shaokin	541	0.53	
Independent	Dinesh Kumar	255	0.25	
Independent	Raghunandan Sharma	252	0.25	
SP	Om Prakash Singh	215	0.21	
Independent	Vedpal Singh	210	0.21	
Independent	Raj Kumar	137	0.13	
ABSP	Krishan Kumar	105	0.10	
Independent	Jitender Kumar	65	0.06	
Majority		11,453	11.19	−7.30
Turnout		102,328	59.1	+0.47
Independent hold		Swing		

=== 2003 ===
Delhi Assembly elections, 2003: Najafgarh
Party	Candidate	Votes	%	±%
Independent	Ranbir Singh	43,342	46.90	
INC	Kanwal Singh	26,252	28.41	+0.39
BJP	Jai Om Dagar	7,970	8.62	
INLD	Bharat Singh	7,460	8.07	−12.35
BSP	Subhash	5,638	6.10	+3.26
Independent	Har Prasad Prajapati	451	0.49	
Independent	Sheela Devi	338	0.37	
Independent	Bhram Sharma	230	0.25	
Independent	Bal Raj Singh	152	0.16	
Independent	Ram Avtar	143	0.15	
Independent	Suresh Kumar Chauhan	131	0.14	
SHSP	S S Goswami	120	0.13	
Independent	Anirudh Kumar	96	0.10	
Independent	Devender Singh	83	0.09	
Majority		17,090	18.49	+16.07
Turnout		92,406	58.63	+2.85
Independent gain from INC		Swing		

=== 1998 ===
Delhi Assembly elections, 1998: Najafgarh
Party	Candidate	Votes	%	±%
INC	Kanwal Singh	21,111	28.02	+12.49
Independent	Jai Kishan Sharma	19,284	25.60	
INLD	Pritam Singh	15,382	20.42	
RJD	Jagbir	6,244	8.29	
Independent	Jai Om Dagar	5,980	7.94	
Independent	Rajesh Sharma	3,170	4.21	
BSP	Rameshwar Singh	2,142	2.84	−1.63
JD	Vijay Pal	875	1.16	−14.65
Independent	Dinesh Kumar Bharadwaj	465	0.62	
Independent	Mahavir Singh	292	0.39	+0.24
SP	Sameer Singh	165	0.22	−0.75
Independent	Satvir Singh Goswamy	110	0.15	
Independent	Rajesh Kumar	83	0.11	
Independent	Krishna Choudhary	36	0.05	
Majority		1,827	2.42	−7.26
Turnout		75,339	61.48	−4.94
INC gain from Independent		Swing	+12.49	

=== 1993 ===
Delhi Assembly elections, 1993: Najafgarh
Party	Candidate	Votes	%	±%
Independent	Suraj Prasad Paliwal	19,582	35.23	
BJP	Ran Singh Dagar	14,203	25.55	
JD	Jai Om Dagar	8,785	15.81	
INC	Ram Kala Dabas	8,629	15.53	
BSP	Rameshwar	2,487	4.47	
Independent	Sat Pal Malik	733	1.32	
SP	Chand Singh Dagar	539	0.97	
Independent	Suraj Bhan	211	0.38	
JP	Dev Raj Singh Raghav	143	0.26	
Independent	Ved Varat Dagar	112	0.20	
Independent	Mahavir Singh	86	0.15	
Independent	Shiv Singh Bhandari	42	0.08	
Doordarshi Party	Ram Bilas	28	0.05	
Majority		5,379	9.68	
Turnout		55,580	66.42	
Independent hold		Swing		

== See also ==
- Najafgarh
