= Fateh Singh (Delhi politician) =

Indian politician (born 1957)

Member of the Delhi Legislative Assembly
- In office 2015–2020
- Preceded by: Ranjeet Singh Kashyap
- Succeeded by: Surendra Kumar
- Constituency: Gokalpur

Personal details
- Born: 13 January 1957 (age 69)
- Party: Bhartiya Janata Party
- Occupation: Business & Politician

Fateh Singh (born 13 January 1957) is an Indian politician from the Aam Aadmi Party (AAP) in Delhi. He was a member of the Sixth Legislative Assembly of Delhi and represented Gokalpur (Assembly constituency) of Delhi. Earlier, he was a member of the Bharatiya Janata Party (BJP). He was a member of First Legislative Assembly of Delhi and served as its deputy speaker from 1995 to 1998.

== Personal life ==
He is a materials dealer. He is the son of Saktoo Singh. He is a Bachelor of Arts (BA) from Chaudhary Charan Singh University (CCS university) of Uttar Pradesh. He is married; his wife is a housewife.

== Political career ==
Fateh Singh contested the 1993 Delhi Legislative Assembly elections in the Nand Nagari assembly constituency, which was reserved for scheduled castes, on a Bharatiya Janata Party (BJP) ticket. He got 13,429 votes and defeated his nearest rival Rup Chand of the Indian National Congress (INC) by a margin of 781 votes. He became member of the First Legislative Assembly of Delhi and was elected the deputy speaker from 1995 to 1998. He also was on the Rules Committee, as the deputy speaker.

Fateh Singh contested as an independent in the 2008 Delhi Legislative Assembly elections from Gokalpur (Assembly constituency). He got 10,262 votes and came fourth. Bahujan Samaj Party's Surendra Kumar won, while BJP's Ranjeet Singh was third.

Fateh Singh defected to the Aam Aadmi Party (AAP) from the BJP in December 2014, with three other BJP leaders. This was officially announced in an AAP rally at Shahdara. He contested the 2015 Delhi Legislative Assembly elections from Gokalpur and got 71,240 votes, defeating the sitting MLA (member of Legislative Assembly) Ranjeet Singh of the BJP by 31,968 votes.
