= Surendra Kumar =

Member of Delhi Legislative Assembly

Surendra Kumar Member of the Legislative Assembly

Member of the Delhi Legislative Assembly for Gokalpur
- In office 2008–2013
- Preceded by: Balzor Singh
- Succeeded by: Ranjeet Singh Kashyap
- Incumbent
- Assumed office 2020
- Preceded by: Fateh Singh

Personal details
- Born: 13 January 1967 (age 59)
- Party: Aam Aadmi Party
- Parent: Mangat Ram
- Education: 10th Pass CBSE Board, Delhi
- Occupation: Business & Politician

Surendra Kumar is an Indian politician and is a Member of the Legislative Assembly of Delhi. He represents the Gokalpur (SC) constituency of Delhi and is a member of the Aam Aadmi Party political party. He was also a member of the Legislative Assembly between 2008 and 2013.

Surendra Kumar joined the Aam Aadmi Party in the presence of National Convener Arvind Kejriwal and Delhi Election Head Sanjay Singh on 17 October 2019 at Party Office in ITO, Delhi.

== Early life and education ==
Surendra lives at East Jyoti Nagar in Delhi, and educated till 10th from CBSE Board Delhi.

== Political career ==
Surendra, represents the Gokalpur (SC) constituency of Delhi on the ticket of Bahujan Samaj Party and now a member of the Aam Aadmi Party political party.
