= Kulwant Rana =

Indian politician

Member of the Delhi Legislative Assembly
- Incumbent
- Assumed office 1 December 2003
- Succeeded by: Mohinder Goyal
- Constituency: Rithala, Delhi

Personal details
- Born: 5 December 1970
- Party: Bharatiya Janata Party
- Occupation: Politician

Kulwant Rana is an Indian politician currently serving as a member of the Delhi Legislative Assembly, representing the Rithala constituency. He is a member of the Bharatiya Janata Party and has previously served as the Vice President of the BJP Delhi State.

He was elected as an MLA in 2003 and re-elected in 2008, 2013. In 2025, he was elected as an MLA from the BJP for the fourth time.

== Early life and education ==
Kulwant Rana is from Rithala, New Delhi. He was born in 1970 into a Hindu Jat family to Devender Rana.

He studied Bachelors of Arts History from Manonmaniam Sunderanar University.
