= Devender Yadav =

Indian politician (born 1972)

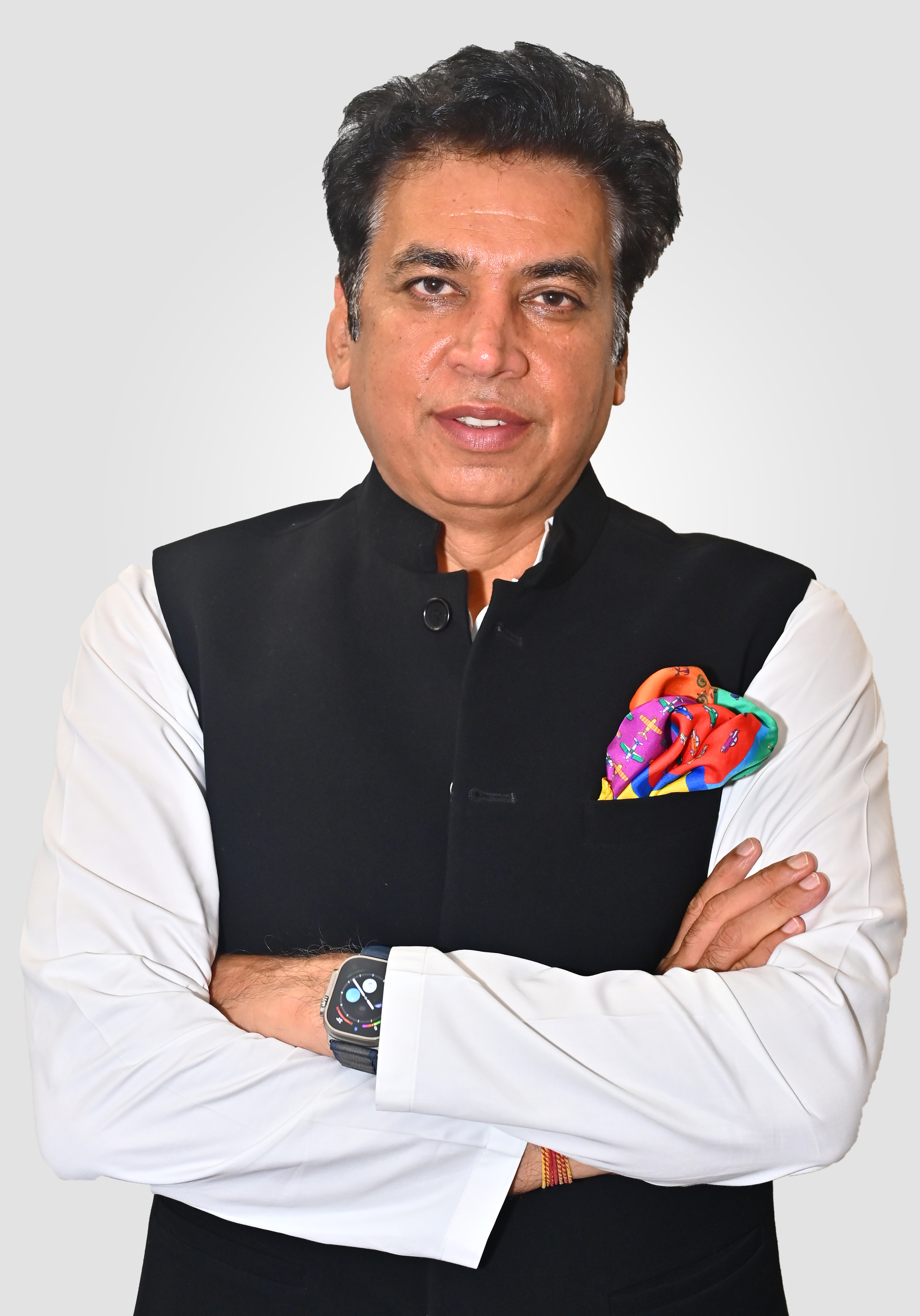

President, Delhi Pradesh Congress Committee
- Incumbent
- Assumed office 29 April 2024
- Preceded by: Arvinder Singh Lovely

AICC Incharge of Punjab Pradesh Congress Committee
- In office December 2023 – 14 February 2025
- Preceded by: Harish Chaudhary
- Succeeded by: Bhupesh Baghel

AICC Incharge of Uttarakhand Pradesh Congress Committee
- In office September 2020 – December 2023
- Preceded by: Anugrah Narayan Singh
- Succeeded by: Selja Kumari

Member of the Delhi Legislative Assembly
- In office 2008–2015
- Preceded by: Jai Bhagwan Aggarwal
- Succeeded by: Ajesh Yadav
- Constituency: Badli

Working President Delhi Pradesh Congress Committee
- In office Jan 2019 – 2020
- President: Sheila Dikshit

Municipal Councillor Municipal Corporation of Delhi
- In office 2007–2017

Personal details
- Born: 13 September 1972 (age 53)
- Party: Indian National Congress
- Parent: Mahender Yadav (father)

Devender Yadav is an Indian politician belonging to the Indian National Congress (INC). He is currently the President of Delhi Pradesh Congress Committee, a permanent invitee to Congress Working Committee (CWC). He is also a founder of the Nation First Foundation, an NGO focused on providing equal opportunities for the underprivileged.

He has served as the INC in charge of Uttarakhand, the Working President of Delhi Pradesh Congress Committee under President Sheila Dixit and was a Member of the Legislative Assembly from Badli constituency in Delhi from 2008-2013 and 2013-15. He was also an MC from Samaypur Badli for two terms from 2007 onwards.

== Political career ==
He is a member of the INC Screening Committee and an ex-MLA of the Badli constituency. He was elected for the Fourth and Fifth Legislative Assembly of Delhi. He has served four terms as MC/MLA from Samaypur Badli, Delhi.

== Election results ==
=== 2013 ===
Delhi Assembly elections, 2013: Badli
Party	Candidate	Votes	%	±%
INC	Devender Yadav	54,372	44.60	+4.74
BJP	Vijay Kumar Bhagat	31,263	25.65	+6.60
AAP	Mohan Krishan	31,098	25.51	
BSP	Munawwar Hassan	2,125	1.74	−24.29
JD(U)	Mahesh Sahu	615	0.50	
Independent	Mohan Jha	418	0.34	
HND	Puneet Mandal	274	0.22	
RLD	Raj Kumar	253	0.21	
SP	Waqar Khan	204	0.17	
Independent	Manoj Kumar Pandey	190	0.16	
Independent	Jai Pal	108	0.09	
NOTA	None	978	0.80	
Majority		23,109	18.96	+5.13
Turnout		121,911	61.53	
INC hold		Swing	+4.74	

=== 2008 ===
Delhi Assembly elections, 2008: Badli
Party	Candidate	Votes	%	±%
INC	Devender Yadav	39,215	39.86	−0.70
BSP	Ajesh Yadav	25,611	26.03	+22.69
BJP	Rajesh Yadav	18,743	19.05	−34.28
NCP	Jitender Kumar	11,242	11.43	
RJD	Parwinder Singh	1,165	1.18	+0.74
Majority		13,604	13.83	+1.06
Turnout		98,381	57.1	+9.22
INC hold		Swing	-0.70	
