= Neelam Pahalwan =

Indian politician

Member of Delhi Legislative Assembly
- Incumbent
- Assumed office 8 February 2025
- Preceded by: Kailash Gahlot
- Constituency: Najafgarh

Personal details
- Party: Bharatiya Janata Party

Neelam Pahalwan is an Indian politician from the Bharatiya Janata Party (BJP) in Delhi. She was elected as a Member of the Legislative Assembly (MLA) in the 8th Delhi Assembly from the Najafgarh Assembly constituency, becoming the first woman MLA from Najafgarh.

Neelam Pahalwan submitted a proposal in the Delhi Assembly to rename the constituency name Najafgarh to 'Nahargarh'.

== Political career ==
In the 2025 Delhi Assembly elections, Neelam Pahalwan won from Najafgarh as a BJP candidate, defeating Tarun Kumar of the Aam Aadmi Party (AAP).

She has proposed the renaming of Najafgarh to 'Nahargarh', citing historical reasons.

== Personal life ==
Neelam Pahalwan holds a Master of Arts (MA) in English. She is married to Krishan Kumar.
