= Gokalpur =

- Village
- Location in Punjab, India Gokalpur (India)
- Coordinates: 31.240273°N 75.542227°E
- Country: India
- State: Punjab
- District: Kapurthala

Government
  - Type: Panchayati raj (India)
  - Body: Gram panchayat

Population (2011)
  - Total: 39
- Sex ratio 20/19♂/♀

Languages
  - Official: Punjabi
  - Other spoken: Hindi
- Time zone: UTC+5:30 (IST)
- PIN: 144601
- Telephone code: 01822
- ISO 3166 code: IN-PB
- Vehicle registration: PB-09
- Website: kapurthala.gov.in

Gokalpur is a village in Kapurthala district of Punjab State, India. It is located 10 kilometres (6.2 mi) from Kapurthala, which is both district and sub-district headquarters of Gokalpur. The village is administrated by a Sarpanch, who is an elected representative.

== Demography ==
According to the report published by Census India in 2011, Gokalpur has total number of 7 houses and population of 39 of which include 20 males and 19 females. Literacy rate of Gokalpur is 62.86%, lower than state average of 75.84%. The population of children under the age of 6 years is 4 which is 10.26% of total population of Gokalpur, and child sex ratio is approximately 1000, higher than state average of 846.

== Population data ==
Particulars	Total	Male	Female
Total No. of Houses	7	-	-
Population	39	20	19
Child (0-6)	4	2	2
Schedule Caste	6	4	2
Schedule Tribe	0	0	0
Literacy	62.86 %	66.67 %	58.82 %
Total Workers	18	11	7
Main Worker	11	0	0
Marginal Worker	7	5	2

== Air travel connectivity ==
The closest airport to the village is Sri Guru Ram Dass Jee International Airport.
