= Sarita Singh =

Indian politician (born 1981)

President of Chhatra Yuva Sangharsh Samiti
- Incumbent
- Assumed office 9 April 2014
- Preceded by: Post established

Member of the Delhi Legislative Assembly
- In office 12 February 2015 – 12 February 2020
- Preceded by: Jitender Mahajan
- Succeeded by: Jitender Mahajan
- Constituency: Rohtas Nagar

Personal details
- Born: 8 June 1981 (age 45) Delhi, India
- Party: Aam Aadmi Party
- Education: Delhi University
- Occupation: Politician
- Known for: Education policies Political activism

Sarita Singh is an Indian politician, who is the incumbent president of Chhatra Yuva Sangharsh Samiti,( CYSS ) the student's wing of the Aam Aadmi Party (AAP). She was a member of the Sixth Legislative Assembly of Delhi and represented Rohtas Nagar (Assembly constituency) of Delhi. Singh is also a social worker.

== Early life and education ==
Sarita is the daughter of Awadesh Kumar Singh. After completing her Master of Arts (M. A.) in Sociology from the Delhi University (DU), Singh focussed on social work. She was aged 28 years in February 2015. Singh is a resident of Ram nagar, which is part of the Rohtas Nagar assembly constituency she represents. She is a Purvanchali, belonging to the Purvanchal area, which comprises Eastern Uttar Pradesh and Bihar.

== Political career ==
Sarita Singh is the president of Chhatra Yuva Sangharsh Samiti, the student's wing of the Aam Aadmi Party (AAP).

Singh was one of the six female M.L.A.s elected to Sixth Legislative Assembly of Delhi by winning the February 2015 Delhi Legislative Assembly elections. All of them were from the AAP. AAP won 67 of 70 seats in the assembly. Singh won from the Rohtas Nagar (Assembly constituency), securing 62,209 votes. She defeated the sitting M.L.A. Jitender Mahajan (Jitender Kumar) of the Bharatiya Janata Party (BJP) by a margin of 7,874 votes. Mahajan had defeated Mukesh Hooda of the AAP by a margin of more than 14,000 votes in the previous Delhi Legislative Assembly elections in 2013.

During the election campaign, Singh's car was attacked and damaged with iron rods and wooden clubs by a group of unidentified miscreants in North east Delhi, in the night while she was on the way home. The Hindu noted that she was fielded by the AAP to appease the large migrant population from Purvanchal.

== Posts Held ==
#	From	To	Position	Comments
01	2015	2020	Member, Sixth Legislative Assembly of Delhi	

== See also ==
- Sixth Legislative Assembly of Delhi
- Aam Aadmi Party
