= Shobhit University =

Private university in Uttar Pradesh, India

- Type: Private
- Established: 2012
- Affiliations: UGC, NCTE
- Chancellor: Kunwar Shekhar Vijendra
- Vice-Chancellor: Ranjit Singh
- Location: Gangoh, Uttar Pradesh, India
- Website: sug.ac.in

Shobhit University is a private university located in Gangoh, Saharanpur district, Uttar Pradesh, India. It was established in July 2012 under the Shobhit Vishwavidhaylaya, Uttar Pradesh Adhiniyam, 2011.

== History ==
Shobhit University began its way in July 2000, with the establishment of Shobhit Institute of Engineering and Technology (SIET) by the NICE Society, which was itself established in July 1989. The institute included two engineering colleges, at Gangoh and Meerut, the latter better known as Shobhit Institute of Engineering and Technology, Saharanpur. The college was affiliated to Uttar Pradesh Technical University and later to Gautam Buddh Technical University, both now Dr. A.P.J. Abdul Kalam Technical University.

In July 2006 the NICE Society established the Adarsh Vijendra Institute of Pharmaceutical Sciences (AVIPS), now a constituent college of the university. In November 2006 the Meerut college received deemed to be university status, and became popularly known as Shobhit University, Meerut, officially Shobhit Institute of Engineering and Technology.

In July 2012 the Gangoh college became a university under the Shobhit Vishwavidhaylaya, Uttar Pradesh Adhiniyam, 2011. The School of Law and Constitutional Studies (SLCS) was established in July 2013, followed by the Kunwar Shekhar Vijendra Ayurved Medical College and Research Centre in July 2014, the School of Education in July 2015 and the Kunwar Shekhar Vijendra Medical College of Naturopathy and Yogic Sciences in January 2016.

== Academics ==
The university offers graduate, postgraduate and professional degrees through the following schools and departments:

- School of Engineering & Technology
- School of Biological Engineering & Sciences
- Department of Computer Science & Applications
- School of Business Studies & Entrepreneurship
- School of Ayurveda
- School of Pharmacy
- School of Law & Constitutional Studies
- School of Naturopathy
- School of Education
- School of Basic & Applied Sciences
- School of Agriculture & Environmental Sciences

=== Accreditation ===
Like all universities in India, Shobhit University is approved by the University Grants Commission (UGC). The education programmes are recognised by the National Council for Teacher Education (NCTE). Shobhit University Gangoh is ranked 57th by India Today 2023 under the University (Private) category, 101-125 by NIRF 2023 under the Pharmacy category, and 119 by Outlook 2023 under the Engineering (Private) category.
