= Manoj Kumar Shokeen =

Indian politician (born 1967)

Member of Delhi Legislative Assembly
- Incumbent
- Assumed office 2025
- Preceded by: Raghuvinder Shokeen
- Constituency: Nangloi Jat (AC-11)

Member of Delhi Legislative Assembly
- In office 2013–2014
- Preceded by: Bijender Singh
- Succeeded by: Raghuvinder Shokeen
- Constituency: Nangloi Jat (AC-11)

Member of Delhi Legislative Assembly
- In office 2008–2013
- Preceded by: New seat
- Succeeded by: Raghuvinder Shokeen
- Constituency: Mundka (AC-08)

President of Outer Delhi BJP
- Incumbent
- Assumed office 2017

Personal details
- Born: 7 July 1967 (age 58) Delhi, India
- Party: Bharatiya Janata Party (BJP)

Manoj Kumar Shokeen (born 7 July 1967) is an Indian politician from the Bharatiya Janata Party (BJP) and a member of the Delhi Legislative Assembly from Nangloi Jat (AC-11) since 2025. He defeated Aam Aadmi Party's Transport Minister, Raghuvinder Shokeen, by a margin of 26,251 votes in the 2025 Delhi Legislative Assembly elections.

== Political career ==
Manoj Kumar Shokeen has been elected to the Delhi Legislative Assembly three times, making him a seasoned politician. He holds the distinction of being elected from two different Assembly Constituencies:

- Mundka (AC-08) in 2008
- Nangloi Jat (AC-11) in 2013 and 2025

Shokeen has also served as the President of Outer Delhi BJP since 2017.

== Electoral history ==
- 2025: Elected MLA from Nangloi Jat (AC-11), defeating Raghuvinder Shokeen (AAP) by 26,251 votes.
- 2013: Elected MLA from Nangloi Jat (AC-11), defeating Bijender Singh (INC) by about 11,000 votes.
- 2008: Elected MLA from Mundka (AC-08), defeating Prem Chander Kaushik (INC) by about 15,000 votes.
- 1997-2002: Served as a municipal councillor from Nangloi.
- 2015: Lost to Raghuvinder Shokeen (AAP) in the Delhi Assembly elections.
