= Rajasthan Right to Health Care Act 2022 =

State law

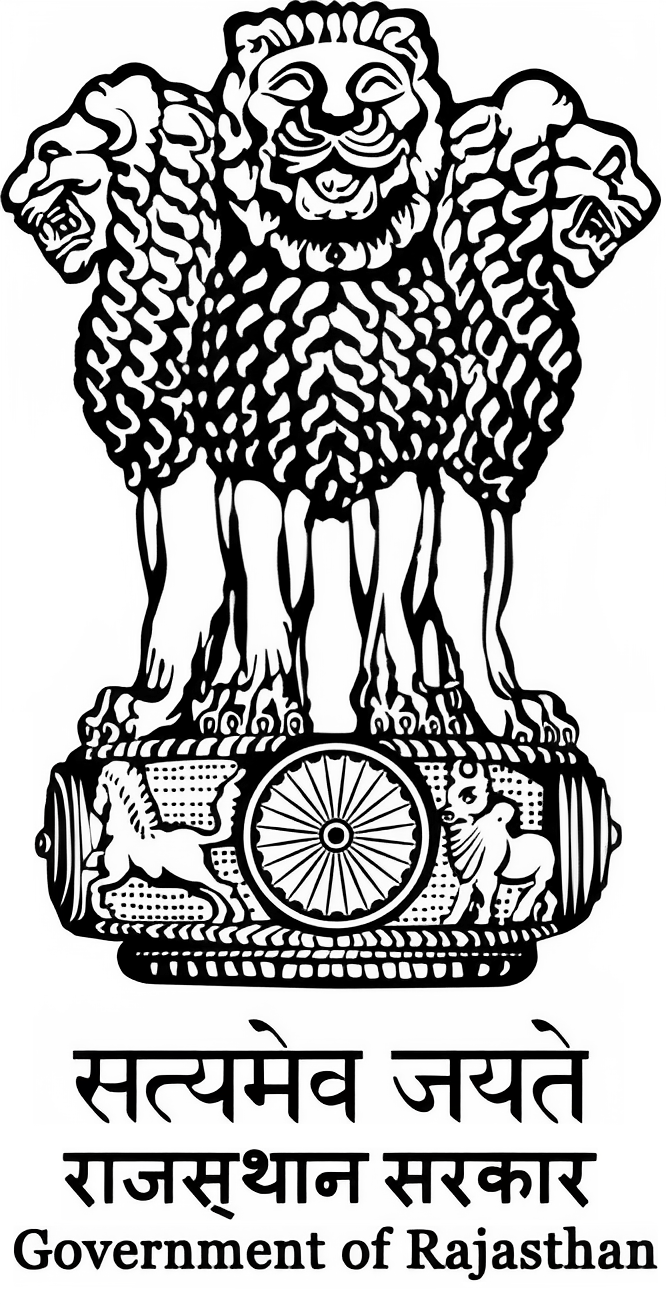

Rajasthan Legislative Assembly
- Long title: Providing free health care to the citizens of the state even in private hospitals
- Citation: Bill No. 21, Year 2022
- Territorial extent: Rajasthan
- Passed by: Rajasthan Legislative Assembly
- Passed: 21 March 2023
- Signed by: Kalraj Mishra (Governor)
- Signed: 12 April 2023
- Commenced: 12 April 2023

Legislative history
- Bill title: Rajasthan Right to Health Care Act 2022
- Introduced by: Parsadi Lal Meena (Health Minister)
- Introduced: 22 Sep 2022
- Committee responsible: Select committee (parliamentary system)
- Status: In force

The Government of Rajasthan has passed the Rajasthan Right to Health Care Act 2022 in the Assembly, making it the first state to do so in India. The bill gives every resident of the state the right to avail free Out Patient Department (OPD) services and In Patient Department (IPD) services at all public health facilities. Additionally, similar healthcare services will be provided free of cost at select private facilities. The bill guarantees 20 rights to the residents of the state and is based on Article 47 and the expanded definition of Article 21 of the Indian Constitution.

== Criticism ==
According to the analysis by non-profit PRS Legislative Research the bill does not mention whether private healthcare professionals will be reimbursed by the government. They further stated, "If the government does not reimburse the cost, the private establishments will have no revenue, and would likely shut down.” The implementation of the act would increase the expenditure of the state budget and no additional arrangements to cover the costs have been made by the government. The act also threatens bureaucratic interference in the working of doctors and healthcare professionals. Rajasthan doctors have accused that this bill will increase the incidence of violence against doctors. The bill is accused of not appropriately defining the term emergency. The government is accused of using the act to win elections in the upcoming 2023 Rajasthan Legislative Assembly election.

== Protests ==
The act was passed in the Rajasthan assembly among protests by healthcare professionals. To oppose the provisions of the act, the Indian Medical Association called for country wide protests and threatened to shut countrywide services. All Rajasthan In-Service Doctors Association (ARISDA) has also called for shut down of healthcare services in the state. The protestors have met with government opposition as police used water cannon and baton charge against the protestors.

== See also ==
- Violence against healthcare professionals by country
