= Mukesh Sharma (Delhi politician) =

Indian politician

Mukesh Sharma (born 18 January 1965) is an Indian politician from Delhi. He served as a member of Delhi Legislative Assembly four times, representing Hastsal thrice and Uttam Nagar once. He is currently serving as the Chief Spokesperson and Chairman Media Communication of Delhi Pradesh Congress Committee.

== Position held ==
Year	Description
1993 - 1998	Elected to 1st Delhi Assembly from Hastsal
1998 - 2003	Elected to 2nd Delhi Assembly from Hastsal (2nd term)
2003 - 2008	Elected to 3rd Delhi Assembly from Hastsal (3rd term)
2008 - 2013	Elected to 4th Delhi Assembly from Uttam Nagar (4th term)
