= Aam Aadmi Party – Delhi =

Political party in India

Aam Aadmi Party, Delhi
- Abbreviation: AAP
- Leader: Arvind Kejriwal
- President: Saurabh Bhardwaj
- Headquarters: 1, Pandit Ravi Shankar Shukla Lane, (1 – Canning Lane) New Delhi – 110001
- Student wing: Chhatra Yuva Sangharsh Samiti (CYSS)
- Youth wing: AAP Youth Wing (AYW)
- Women's wing: AAP Mahila Shakti (AMS)
- Labour wing: Shramik Vikas Sangathan (SVS)
- Colours: Blue
- ECI status: National Party
- Seats in Rajya Sabha: 2 / 3
- Seats in Lok Sabha: 0 / 7
- Seats in State Legislative Assemblies: 22 / 70 (Delhi Legislative Assembly)

Election symbol
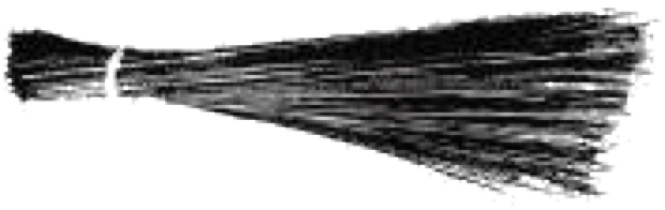
- Broom

Party flag

Website
- aamaadmiparty.org

The Aam Aadmi Party – Delhi (AAP - Delhi) is a state wing of Aam Aadmi Party. AAP became a state party in Delhi in 2013. The party contested its first election in Delhi in 2013 and was successful in winning 28 seats in a hung assembly. It got outside support from Indian National Congress and Arvind Kejriwal became the Chief Minister of Delhi but he resigned after 49 days due to differences with INC. In the following 2015 elections, AAP won 67 of the 70 seats in the assembly, limiting BJP at just 3 seats and INC with none and Kejriwal was sworn in as the Chief Minister of Delhi. AAP formed the government again in the subsequent 2020 Delhi Legislative Assembly election, winning 62 seats. The party was reduced to just 22 seats in 2025 Delhi Legislative Assembly election and was defeated by the BJP which secured 48.

== Electoral performances ==
=== 2013 Delhi Legislative Assembly elections ===
The 2013 Delhi state assembly elections were the party's first electoral contest. The Election Commission approved the symbol of a broom for use by the AAP in that campaign. The party said that its candidates were honest and had been screened for potential criminal backgrounds. It published its central manifesto on 20 November 2013, promising to implement the Jan Lokpal Bill within 15 days of coming to power.

In November 2013, a sting operation conducted by Media Sarkar alleged that several leaders of the AAP, including Kumar Vishwas and Shazia Ilmi, had agreed to extend their support to some people seeking assistance with land deals and other financial arrangements in return for donations in cash to the AAP. Ilmi offered to withdraw her candidature as a result, but the party refused to accept her offer, describing the footage as fabricated and a violation of the Model Code of Conduct. The AAP emerged as the second-largest party in Delhi, winning 28 of the 70 Assembly seats; the Bharatiya Janata Party, as the largest party, won 31, while its ally Shiromani Akali Dal, won 1; Indian National Congress won 8, and two were won by others. On 28 December 2013, the AAP formed a minority government in the hung Assembly, with what Sheila Dikshit describes as "not unconditional" support from Indian National Congress. Kejriwal became the second-youngest Chief Minister of Delhi. As a result of the Delhi elections, AAP became a recognised state party in Delhi.

=== 2014 Indian general election in Delhi ===
AAP lost on all 7 seats and came 2nd on each seat. Its vote share was 32%.

=== 2015 Delhi Legislative Assembly Elections ===
The Delhi state assembly elections for the Sixth Legislative Assembly of Delhi were held on 7 February 2015, as declared by the Election Commission of India. The Aam Aadmi Party scored a landslide victory by winning a majority of 67 of the 70 seats. The BJP was able to win 3 seats and the Congress party saw all its candidates lose. Kejriwal became the Chief Minister for the second time. The AAP had started campaigning in Delhi in November 2014 and declared candidates for all 70 seats.

During the campaign, Kejriwal claimed that the BJP had been trying to bribe AAP volunteers. He asked Delhi voters to not deny the bribes offered to them. He suggested that voters should accept the bribe from others and yet vote for AAP through the secret ballot in the election. The situation caused the Election Commission of India to instruct Kejriwal to desist from breaking laws governing the model code of conduct for elections in India, but the Delhi court then allowed Kejriwal to challenge this.

The President's Rule was subsequently rescinded and Kejriwal became the Chief Minister of Delhi with six cabinet ministers (Manish Sisodia, Asim Ahmed Khan, Sandeep Kumar, Satyendar Jain, Gopal Rai, and Jitender Singh Tomar).

=== 2019 Indian general election in Delhi ===
AAP lost on all seats and lost deposits on 3 seats. Its vote share was 18.11%.

=== 2020 Delhi Legislative Assembly elections ===
AAP contested 2020 Delhi Legislative Assembly Elections on all 70 seats and won 62 seats. Arvind Kejriwal took oath as CM for the 3rd time on 16 February 2020. AAP secured 53.57% votes. Its main opponent BJP and Congress secured 38.51% and 4.26% votes respectively.

=== 2024 Indian general election in Delhi ===
AAP contested with an alliance with the Congress but still lost on all 4 seats it contested. Its vote share was 24%.

=== 2025 Delhi Legislative Assembly elections ===
AAP contested on all 70 seats but it managed to win just 22 seats with several prominent leaders and cabinet ministers including national convener Arvind Kejriwal, Manish Sisodia, Somnath Bharti, Saurabh Bhardwaj and Durgesh Pathak losing their seats. Its vote share reduced to 43.57%. It was ultimately defeated by the BJP, which secured the remaining 48 seats and 47.15% of the total votes.

== List of presidents ==
Election	Portrait	President
2013		Gopal Rai
2015		Gopal Rai
2020		Gopal Rai
2025		Saurabh Bhardwaj

== List of AAP MLAs from Delhi ==
2025 Delhi Legislative Assembly election	8th Delhi Assembly
Constituency	Name
Kalkaji(Leader of Opposition)	Atishi
Sultan Pur Majra (SC)(Deputy Leader of Opposition)	Mukesh Kumar Ahlawat
Burari(Chief Whip)	Sanjeev Jha
Kirari	Anil Jha Vats
Sadar Bazar	Som Dutt
Chandni Chowk	Parlad Singh Sawhney
Matia Mahal	Aaley Mohammad Iqbal
Ballimaran	Imran Hussain
Karol Bagh (SC)	Vishesh Ravi
Patel Nagar (SC)	Pravesh Ratn
Tilak Nagar	Jarnail Singh
Delhi Cantonment	Virender Singh Kadian
Deoli (SC)	Prem Chauhan
Ambedkar Nagar (SC)	Ajay Dutt
Tughlakabad	Sahi Ram
Badarpur	Ram Singh Netaji
Okhla	Amanatullah Khan
Kondli (SC)	Kuldeep Kumar
Seemapuri (SC)	Veer Singh Dhingan
Seelampur	Chaudhary Zubair Ahmad
Babarpur	Gopal Rai
Gokalpur (SC)	Surendra Kumar

== List of AAP MPs from Delhi in Rajya Sabha ==
List of Rajya Sabha members from Delhi
No	Name	Date of Appointment	Date of Retirement
1	Sanjay Singh	28-Jan-2018	27-Jan-2024
1	Sanjay Singh	27-Jan-2024	Incumbent
2	Narain Dass Gupta	28-Jan-2018	27-Jan-2024
2	Narain Dass Gupta	27-Jan-2024	Incumbent
3	Sushil Kumar Gupta	28-Jan-2018	27-Jan -2024
4	Swati Maliwal	27-Jan-2024	24-Apr-2026 (Note: Defected to BJP in 2026.)

== List of ministers (2013-2025) ==
=== Arvind Kejriwal's First Government ===
First Kejriwal Ministry(28 December 2013 – 14 February 2014)
S.No	Name	Constituency	Chief Minister	Constituency
1.	Manish Sisodia (Dy.CM)	Patparganj	Arvind Kejriwal	New Delhi
2.	Satyendra Kumar Jain	Shakur Basti	Arvind Kejriwal	New Delhi
3.	Somnath Bharti	Malviya Nagar	Arvind Kejriwal	New Delhi
4.	Girish Soni	Madipur	Arvind Kejriwal	New Delhi
5.	Rakhi Birla	Mangolpuri	Arvind Kejriwal	New Delhi
6.	Saurabh Bhardwaj	Greater Kailash	Arvind Kejriwal	New Delhi

=== Arvind Kejriwal's Second Government ===
Second Kejriwal Ministry(14 February 2015 – 14 February 2020)
S.No	Name	Constituency	Chief Minister	Constituency
1.	Manish Sisodia (Dy.CM)	Patparganj	Arvind Kejriwal	New Delhi
2.	Satyendra Kumar Jain	Shakur Basti	Arvind Kejriwal	New Delhi
3.	Kapil Mishra	Karawal Nagar	Arvind Kejriwal	New Delhi
4.	Kailash Gahlot	Najafgarh	Arvind Kejriwal	New Delhi
5.	Gopal Rai	Babarpur	Arvind Kejriwal	New Delhi
6.	Imran Hussain	Ballimaran	Arvind Kejriwal	New Delhi
7.	Asim Ahmed Khan	Matia Mahal	Arvind Kejriwal	New Delhi
8.	Rajendra Pal Gautam	Seemapuri	Arvind Kejriwal	New Delhi
9.	Sandeep Kumar	Sultanpur Majra	Arvind Kejriwal	New Delhi
10.	Jitender Singh Tomar	Tri Nagar	Arvind Kejriwal	New Delhi

=== Arvind Kejriwal's Third Government ===
Third Kejriwal ministry(16 February 2020 – 17 September 2024)
S.No	Name	Constituency	Chief Minister	Constituency
1.	Manish Sisodia (Dy.CM)	Patparganj	Arvind Kejriwal	New Delhi
2.	Satyendra Kumar Jain	Shakur Basti	Arvind Kejriwal	New Delhi
3.	Rajendra Pal Gautam	Seemapuri	Arvind Kejriwal	New Delhi
4.	Atishi Marlena	Kalkaji	Arvind Kejriwal	New Delhi
5.	Raaj Kumar Anand	Patel Nagar	Arvind Kejriwal	New Delhi
6.	Saurabh Bhardwaj	Greater Kailash	Arvind Kejriwal	New Delhi
7.	Kailash Gahlot	Najafgarh	Arvind Kejriwal	New Delhi

=== Atishi Marlena Singh's Government ===
Atishi Marlena Ministry(21 September 2024 – 20 February 2025)
S.No	Name	Constituency	Chief Minister	Constituency
1.	Saurabh Bhardwaj	Greater Kailash	Atishi Marlena	Kalkaji
2.	Kailash Gahlot	Najafgarh	Atishi Marlena	Kalkaji
3.	Gopal Rai	Babarpur	Atishi Marlena	Kalkaji
4.	Imran Hussain	Ballimaran	Atishi Marlena	Kalkaji
5.	Mukesh Kumar Ahlawat	Sultanpur Majra	Atishi Marlena	Kalkaji

== Other positions ==
=== Leaders of opposition ===
Election	Portrait	LoP	Duration	
2025		Atishi Marlena	23 January 2025	Incumbent

=== Deputy leaders of opposition ===
Election	Portrait	LoP	Duration
2025		Mukesh Kumar Ahlawat	Incumbent

=== Speakers of Assembly ===
List of Speakers of the Delhi Legislative Assembly
Election	Assembly	Portrait	Speakers	Constituency	Duration
2013	5th		Maninder Singh Dhir	Jangpura	
2015	6th		Ram Niwas Goel	Shahdara	
2020	7th		Ram Niwas Goel	Shahdara	

=== Deputy speakers of Assembly ===
List of Deputy Speakers of the Delhi Legislative Assembly
Election	Assembly	Portrait	Speakers	Constituencies	Duration
2015	6th		Bandana Kumari	Shalimar Bagh	
2015	6th		Rakhi Birla	Mangolpuri	
2020	7th		Rakhi Birla	Mangolpuri	

=== Chief whips ===
Election	Assembly	Portrait	Chief Whips	Constituencies	Duration
2013	5th				
2015	6th				
2020	7th				
2025	8th		Sanjeev Jha	Burari	
