= Kejriwal ministry =

Kejriwal ministry may refer to these cabinets headed by Indian politician Arvind Kejriwal as chief minister of Delhi:

- First Kejriwal ministry (2013–2015)
- Second Kejriwal ministry (2015–2020)
- Third Kejriwal ministry (2020–2024)
