= Second Kejriwal ministry =

Cabinet of Delhi, 2015–2020

- 10th Ministry of Delhi
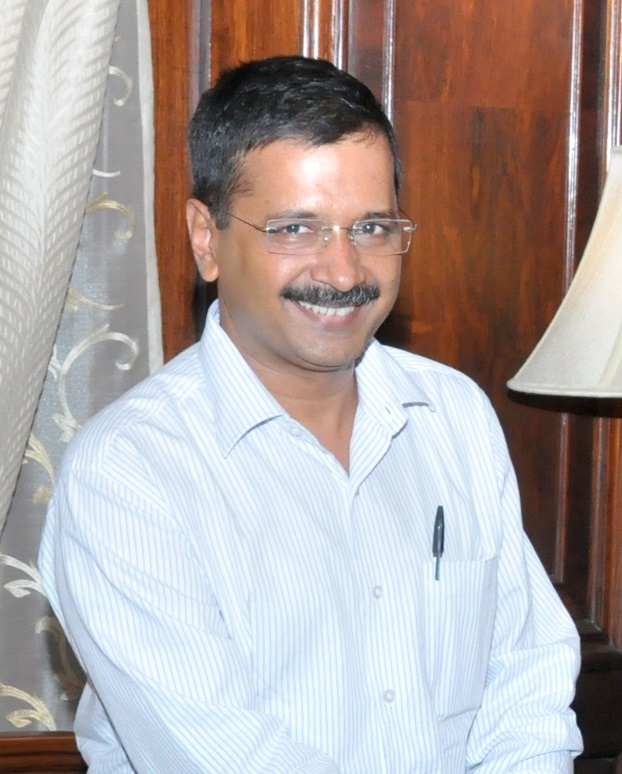
- Arvind Kejriwal
- Date formed: 14 February 2015
- Date dissolved: 14 February 2020

People and organisations
- Head of state: Lt Governor Najeeb Jung (9 July 2013 – 22 December 2016); Lt Governor Anil Baijal (31 December 2016 – present)
- Head of government: Arvind Kejriwal
- No. of ministers: 7
- Member parties: Aam Aadmi Party
- Status in legislature: Majority

History
- Election: February 2015
- Legislature term: 5 years
- Predecessor: First Kejriwal ministry
- Successor: Third Kejriwal ministry

The Second Kejriwal cabinet is the Council of Minister in Delhi Legislative Assembly headed by Chief Minister Arvind Kejriwal.

== Council of Ministers (14 February 2015 – 14 February 2020) ==
Portfolio	Minister	Took office	Left office	Party
Chief Minister	Arvind Kejriwal	14 February 2015	14 February 2020	AAP
Deputy Chief Minister	Manish Sisodia	14 February 2015	14 February 2020	AAP
Finance, Education, Tourism, Planning, Land & Building, Vigilance	Manish Sisodia	14 February 2015	14 February 2020	AAP
Public Works Department (PWD), Services, Women & Child, Art, Culture, Language	Manish Sisodia	14 February 2015	14 February 2020	AAP
Home, Health, Power, Industries, Urban Development, Irrigation, Flood Control	Satyendra Kumar Jain	14 February 2015	14 February 2020	AAP
Labour, Employment, Development, General Administration	Gopal Rai	14 February 2015	14 February 2020	AAP
Food & Supply, Forest & Environment, Elections	Imran Hussain	14 February 2015	14 February 2020	AAP
Social Welfare, SC & ST, Cooperative, Gurudwara Elections	Rajendra Pal Gautam	14 February 2015	14 February 2020	AAP
Transport, Revenue, Law & Justice, Legislative Affairs, Information & Technology, Administrative Reforms	Kailash Gahlot	14 February 2015	14 February 2020	AAP

== Council of Ministers (14 February 2015 – 14 February 2020) ==
Portfolio	Minister	Took office	Left office	Party
Chief Minister	Arvind Kejriwal	14 February 2015	14 February 2020	AAP
Deputy Chief Minister	Manish Sisodia	14 February 2015	14 February 2020	AAP
Finance, Education, Tourism, Planning, Land & Building, Vigilance	Manish Sisodia	14 February 2015	14 February 2020	AAP
Public Works Department (PWD), Services, Women & Child, Art, Culture, Language	Manish Sisodia	14 February 2015	14 February 2020	AAP
Home, Health, Power, Industries, Urban Development, Irrigation, Flood Control	Satyendra Kumar Jain	14 February 2015	14 February 2020	AAP
Labour, Employment, Development, General Administration	Gopal Rai	14 February 2015	14 February 2020	AAP
Food & Supply, Forest & Environment, Elections	Imran Hussain	14 February 2015	14 February 2020	AAP
Social Welfare, SC & ST, Cooperative, Gurudwara Elections	Rajendra Pal Gautam	14 February 2015	14 February 2020	AAP
Transport, Revenue, Law & Justice, Legislative Affairs, Information & Technology, Administrative Reforms	Kailash Gahlot	14 February 2015	14 February 2020	AAP
Law and Justice	Jitender Singh Tomar	14 February 2015	9 June 2015	AAP
Food & Civil Supply, Forest & Environment, Minority Affairs, Elections	Asim Ahmed Khan	14 February 2015	9 October 2015	AAP
SC & ST welfare, Women & Child Welfare	Sandeep Kumar	14 February 2015	31 August 2016	AAP
Tourism, Art, Culture, Languages, Gurudwara Elections, Water	Kapil Mishra	14 February 2015	7 May 2017	AAP

== Major work ==
=== Mohalla Clinic ===
Aam Aadmi Mohalla Clinics (AAMC) were started in every neighbourhood for providing free medical care. The scheme has received international acclaim.

=== Jai Bhim Mukhyamantri Pratibha Vikas Yojana ===
As minister Rajendra Pal Gautam held the charge of social welfare department in the Second Kejriwal ministry. Under his charge Jai Bhim Mukhyamantri Pratibha Vikas Yojana was started. Indian Express noted it as one of Arvind Kejriwal government's most ambitious programmes. In this program, free coaching is provided to children from the Scheduled Castes and Scheduled Tribes to prepare them for IIT JEE, NEET and other competitive exams. When the program started about 4,900 students enrolled for the free coaching classes. in 2022, around 15,000 are enrolled in various courses under this scheme.

== See also ==
- Sixth Legislative Assembly of Delhi
- Third Kejriwal cabinet
