= Kabir Nagar, New Delhi =

Kabir Nagar
- Neighborhood of Delhi
- Location in Delhi, India
- Coordinates: 28°41′33″N 77°16′56″E
- Country: India
- State: Delhi
- Metro: New Delhi

Languages
  - Official: Hindi
- Time zone: UTC+5:30 (IST)
- PIN: 110094

Kabir Nagar is a borough of the town of Babar Pur in North East Delhi district, Delhi, India. Kabir Nagar is known for jeans stitching work, which began in the 1990s. There are many small jeans manufacturing units. Kabir Nagar is a part of the Babarpur constituency and currently the incumbent MLA is Gopal Ray.

The area is divided into several Blocks from A through D. The area is well organized and however become cluttered over years due to rampant unauthorized construction by its residents. For a visitor sometimes finding his way may be a daunting task even if he has correct address. Streets across blocks A, B and D have become totally commercial with almost all road facing plots turned into shops. The most well known blocks are A, B and C Block.

== Transport ==
Kabir Nager is very well connected with other parts of Delhi. It is nearly 14 km from ISBT Kashmiri Gate and 14 km from Anand Vihar Interstate Bus Terminus and about 5 km from Shahdara. There are several buses run by DTC and Blue line that either terminate or touch Kabir Nagar from several parts of Delhi. Some of prominent bus routes are 205,213.218.274.374, 335, 254, 333, 847. Several buses are also available for traveling to adjoining cities, Noida and Ghaziabad.

Nearest Delhi Metro station is Maujpur - Babarpur Metro Station which is about 0.2 Kilometer away. From Shahdara Railway station, several buses and small taxis and Rickshaw ply quite frequently and charge very nominal fare.

== Demographics ==
The area is quite densely populated with a good mix of people from all income groups, castes and religion featuring Muslims, Hindus, Sikh, and many others.

== Results of Babarpur Assembly Elections ==
Result of Babarpur Assembly Election 2003:

The 2003 Delhi Assembly Elections saw 52.84% of the total 102078 voters of Babarpur constituency cast their votes.

Out of the total of 53934 votes polled, the Congress candidate Vinay Sharma secured 25630 votes to win the seat. The nearest rival, Naresh Gaud, from BJP, managed to secure 21371 votes.

Result of Babarpur Assembly Election 2008:

The 2008 Delhi Assembly Elections saw 59.79% of the total 152259 voters of Babarpur constituency cast their votes.

Out of the total of 91032 votes polled, the BJP candidate Naresh Gaur secured 31954 votes to win the seat. The nearest rival, Haji Dilshad Ali, from BSP, managed to secure 28128 votes.

Candidates (Party):

- A. K. Aggarwal (AJP)
- Naresh Gaud (BJP)
- Dilshad Ali (BSP)
- Anil Kuamr (Congress)
- Abid Khan (Independent)
- Inamuddin (Independent)
- Kailash Chand Jain (Independent)
- Mohd Irfan (Independent)
- Mohd. Sher Nabi Chaman (Independent)
- S. A. Betab (Independent)
- Raj Kumar (LJSP)
- Mohd Ahmed (SP)
- Mohd. Viqar Hashmi (UNLP)

Sr Correspondent Ahmed Ansari

== Educational institutions ==
- Nalanda public school
- B.R. Ambedkar College
- Guru Harkishan Public School
- Guru Ramdass College of Education
- Taksila Public School
- V.T. Model Public School
- Ekta Public School
- Mariyam Noor Public School
- Saraswati Vidya Public School
- Divya Jyoti Public School
- Babarpur Model Public School
- Little Gem Public School

== Health Institutions ==
- Guru Teg Bahadur Hospital (GTBH)
- Swami Dayanand Hospital
- Institute of Human Behavior and Allied Sciences (IHBAS)

== Nearby areas ==
- Yamuna Vihar
- Maujpur
- Babarpur
- Gokalpuri
