= Third Kejriwal ministry =

Cabinet of Delhi (2020–2024)

- 11th Ministry of Delhi
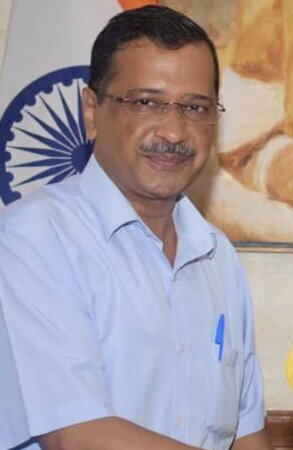
- Arvind Kejriwal
- Date formed: 16 February 2020
- Date dissolved: 17 September 2024

People and organisations
- Head of state: Lt Governor Anil Baijal (until 18 May 2022); Vinai Kumar Saxena (from 26 May 2022)
- Head of government: Arvind Kejriwal (2013–2024)
- No. of ministers: 6
- Member parties: Aam Aadmi Party
- Status in legislature: Majority
- Opposition party: Bharatiya Janata Party

History
- Election: February 2020
- Legislature term: 5 years
- Predecessor: Second Kejriwal ministry
- Successor: Atishi Marlena ministry

The Third Kejriwal cabinet was the Council of Ministers in Delhi Legislative Assembly headed by Chief Minister Arvind Kejriwal.

== History ==
In August 2022 a floor majority test was conducted in the Delhi Assembly by the Delhi Chief Minister, to prove that the AAP government enjoyed the majority and BJP's Operation Lotus had failed to poach AAP MLAs.

== Council of Ministers ==
=== By ministry ===
Portfolio	Minister	Took office	Left office	Party	Ref
Chief Minister; Other departments not allocated to any Minister.	Arvind Kejriwal	16 February 2020	17 September 2024	AAP	
Deputy Chief Minister; Finance; Public Works; Education; Tourism; Planning; Land & Building; Vigilance; Services; Art; Culture; Language	Manish Sisodia	16 February 2020	28 February 2023	AAP	
Finance; Public Works; Education; Tourism; Planning; Land & Building; Vigilance; Services; Art; Culture; Language	Atishi	9 March 2023	17 September 2024	AAP	
Home; Health; Power; Water; Industries; Urban development; Irrigation; Flood Control; Labour; Employment	Satyendra Kumar Jain	16 February 2020	28 February 2023	AAP	
Home; Health; Power; Water; Industries; Urban development; Irrigation; Flood Control; Labour; Employment	Saurabh Bhardwaj	9 March 2023	17 September 2024	AAP	
Development; General Administration; Environment	Gopal Rai	16 February 2020	17 September 2024	AAP	
Transport; Revenue; Law & Justice; Legislative Affairs; Information & Technology; Administrative Reforms	Kailash Gahlot	16 February 2020	17 September 2024	AAP	
Social welfare; SC & ST; Cooperative; Gurudwara Elections; Women & Child	Rajendra Pal Gautam	16 February 2020	19 October 2022	AAP	
Social welfare; SC & ST; Cooperative; Gurudwara Elections; Women & Child	Raaj Kumar Anand	19 October 2022	11 June 2024	AAP	
Food & supply; Forest; Elections	Imran Hussain	16 February 2020	17 September 2024	AAP	

=== By year ===
- 2020 : On 16 February, CM Arvind Kejriwal announced the first appointment of ministers to the departments of Delhi state government.
Cabinet between February 2020 - October 2022

Portfolio	Minister	Took office	Left office	Party	Ref
Chief Minister New Delhi; Other departments not allocated to any Minister.	Arvind Kejriwal	16 February 2020	Incumbent	AAP	
Finance; Education; Tourism; Planning; Land & Building; Vigilance; Services; Art; Culture; Language	Manish Sisodia	16 February 2020	Incumbent	AAP	
Home; Health; Public Works Department; Power; Water; Industries; Urban development; Irrigation; Flood Control; Labour; Employment	Satyendra Kumar Jain	16 February 2020	Incumbent	AAP	
Development; General Administration; Environment	Gopal Rai	16 February 2020	Incumbent	AAP	
Transport; Revenue; Law & Justice; Legislative Affairs; Information & Technology; Administrative Reforms	Kailash Gahlot	16 February 2020	Incumbent	AAP	
Social welfare; SC & ST; Cooperative; Gurudwara Elections; Women & Child	Rajendra Pal Gautam	16 February 2020	9 October 2022	AAP	
Food & supply; Forest; Elections	Imran Hussain	16 February 2020	Incumbent	AAP	

- 2022 : On 8 October, Rajendra Pal Gautam announced his resignation from the #Council of Ministers of Delhi state government. AAP has not responded formally to the resignation.

== Former members ==
No..	Name (Constituency)	Departments	Tenure	Reason	Party
1.	Rajendra Pal Gautam; Cabinet Minister (Seemapuri)	Social Welfare SC & ST Cooperative Gurudwara Elections Women & Child	16 February 2020 – 9 October 2022	Resigned	AAP
2.	Manish Sisodia; Deputy Chief Minister (Patparganj)	Finance Public Works Education Tourism Planning Land & Building Vigilance Services Art Culture Language	16 February 2020 – 28 February 2023	Resigned	AAP
3.	Satyendra Kumar Jain; Cabinet Minister (Shakur Basti)	Home Health Power Water Industries Urban development Irrigation Flood Control Labour Employment	16 February 2020 – 28 February 2023	Resigned	AAP
4.	Raaj Kumar Anand; Cabinet Minister (Patel Nagar)	Social Welfare SC & ST Cooperative Gurudwara Elections Women & Child	19 October 2022 – 11 June 2024	Resigned	AAP

== Budget ==
On 26 March 2022, a budget of ₹75,800 crore rupees was presented in the Delhi Assembly by the Finance minister Manish Sisodia. AAP leaders expected that the budget would create employment for 20 lakh people in Delhi, in the upcoming five years.

== Major work ==
=== Mohalla Clinic ===
Aam Aadmi Mohalla Clinics (AAMC) were opened in every neighborhood for providing free medical care. The scheme has received international acclaim.

=== Jai Bheem Mukhyamantri Pratiba Vikas Yojana ===
As minister Rajendra Pal Gautam held the charge of social welfare department in the Kejriwal ministry. Under his charge Jai Bheem Mukhyamantri Pratiba Vikas Yojana was started. Indian Express noted it as one of Arvind Kejriwal government's most ambitious programmes. In this program, free coaching is provided to children from the Scheduled Castes and Scheduled Tribes to prepare them for IIT JEE, NEET and other competitive exams. When the program started about 4,900 students enrolled for the free coaching classes. in 2022, around 15,000 are enrolled in various courses under this scheme.

== See also ==
- Seventh Legislative Assembly of Delhi
