= Mukesh Kumar Ahlawat =

Indian politician

Cabinet Minister, Government of Delhi
- In office 21 September 2024 – 9 February 2025
- Lieutenant Governor: Vinai Kumar Saxena
- Chief Minister: Atishi Marlena
- Ministry and Departments: Gurudwara Elections, SC & ST, Land & Building, Labour, Employment
- Preceded by: Raaj Kumar Anand
- Succeeded by: Ravinder Indraj Singh

Member of the Delhi Legislative Assembly
- Incumbent
- Assumed office 11 February 2020
- Preceded by: Sandeep Kumar
- Constituency: Sultanpur Majra

Personal details
- Party: Aam Aadmi Party
- Occupation: Politician

Mukesh Kumar Ahlawat is an Indian politician who currently serves as Deputy Leader of Opposition in Delhi Legislative Assembly. Mukesh Kumar Ahlawat, born in a village, completed his 12th grade in 1994 from Ravindra Public School. As a first-time MLA from Sultanpur Majra, he rose impressively in politics, marking his entry into the Delhi Cabinet by filling the SC-ST quota. His tactical selection highlights his growing influence and potential within AAP. He was a Cabinet Minister in Government of Delhi and is member of the Seventh Legislative Assembly of Delhi. He is a member of the Aam Aadmi Party and represents Sultan Pur Majra of Delhi. He won the election by 17,126 votes, replacing Sandeep Kumar former minister for the welfare of Scheduled castes. Mukesh Kumar Ahlawat has championed welfare initiatives for Scheduled Castes, focusing on social equity and empowerment. Mukesh considers himself a businessman. Mukesh Ahlawat faced criticism for his limited experience before joining the Cabinet, sparking debates on merit in politics.

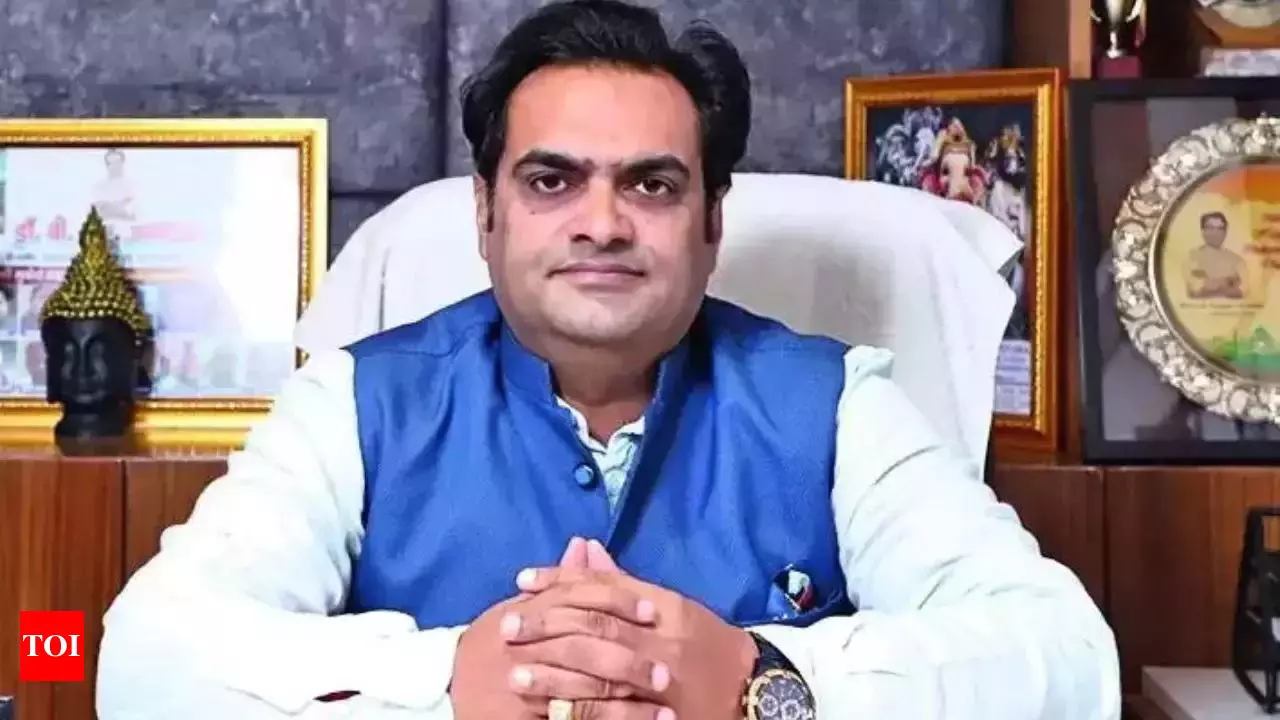

== Electoral performance ==
=== 2025 ===
(Decrease) (decrease)

Delhi Assembly elections, 2025: Sultanpur Majra
Party	Candidate	Votes	%	±%
AAP	Mukesh Kumar Ahlawat	58,767	52.09	−
BJP	Karam Singh Karma	41,641	36.91	
INC	Jai Kishan	8688		−
NOTA	None of the above			−
Majority		17,126		−
Turnout		1,12,825		−
AAP hold		Swing	−	

2020 Delhi Legislative Assembly elections: Sultanpur Majra
Party	Candidate	Votes	%	±%
AAP	Mukesh Kumar Ahlawat	74,573	66.51	−2.99
BJP	Ram Chander Chawriya	26,521	23.65	+9.94
INC	Jai Kishan	9,033	8.06	−4.96
BSP	Neelam	671	0.60	−1.86
NOTA	None of the above	460	0.41	−0.04
Majority		48,052	42.86	−12.93
Turnout		1,12,184	63.88	−4.08
AAP hold		Swing	−2.99	

State Legislative Assembly
Preceded by Sandeep Kumar	Member of the Delhi Legislative Assembly from Sultan Pur Majra Assembly constituency 2020–present	Incumbent
