= Avinash Pandey =

Indian politician

Avinash Pande
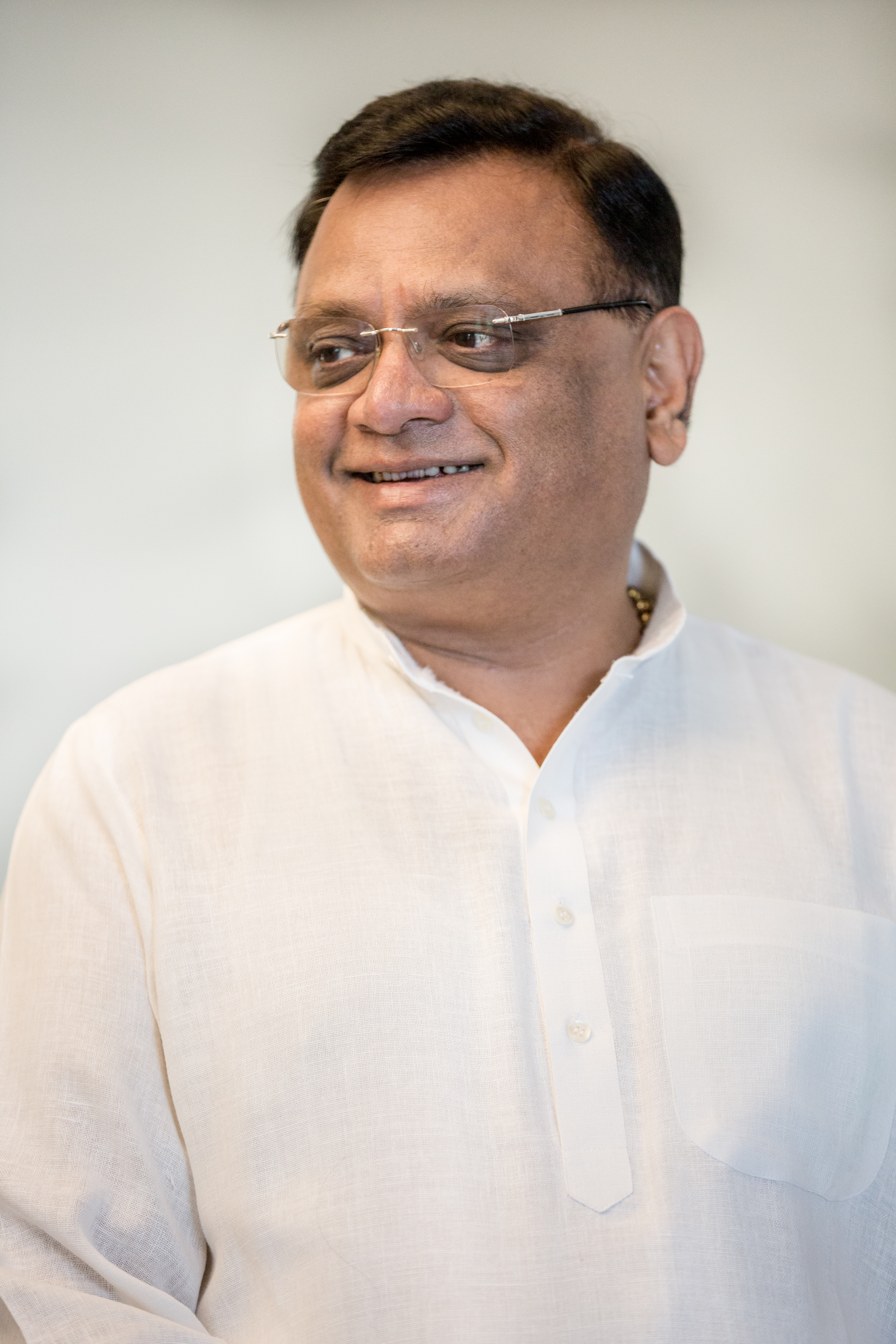
- Avinash Pande, EX MP Rajya Sabha, INC

General Secretary of the All India Congress Committee (in-charge of Uttar Pradesh)
- In office 24 December 2023 – 26 June 2026
- Preceded by: Priyanka Gandhi Vadra
- Succeeded by: Rajendra Pal Gautam

Member of Parliament, Rajya Sabha
- In office 5 July 2010 – 4 July 2016
- Constituency: Maharashtra

Member of the Maharashtra Legislative Assembly
- In office 1985–1990
- Constituency: Nagpur East

Personal details
- Party: Indian National Congress
- Education: Nagpur University
- Occupation: Politician

Avinash Pande is an Indian politician from the Indian National Congress. In December 2023 he became the General Secretary of the All India Congress Committee (AICC), in charge of Uttar Pradesh.

== Early life and education ==
Avinash Pande was born in Nagpur, Maharashtra. He holds postgraduate qualifications in economics and public administration, and is also trained as a lawyer.

== Political career ==
Mr. Pande won the **Nagpur East** seat in the Maharashtra Legislative Assembly in 1985 as an INC candidate.

In 2008, he contested elections to the Rajya Sabha but lost by one vote to industrialist Rahul Bajaj. He was later elected to the Rajya Sabha from Maharashtra and served from 5 July 2010 to 4 July 2016.

He was appointed AICC General Secretary in charge of Jharkhand in January 2022, before being given charge of Uttar Pradesh in December 2023.

== Publications ==
Avinash Pande has coordinated and compiled works on the poet Rashtra Kavi Pradeep, including Shabd Swar Ke Sumeru (1995) and Ek Deep Kavi Pradeep (2007).
