= Madipur Assembly constituency =

Constituency of the Delhi legislative assembly in India

Coordinates: 28.671°N 77.117°E

Madipur
- Constituency No. 26 for the Delhi Legislative Assembly

Constituency details
- Country: India
- Region: North India
- Union Territory: Delhi
- District: West Delhi
- Established: 1983
- Reservation: SC

Member of Legislative Assembly
- 8th Delhi Legislative Assembly
- Incumbent Kailash Gangwal
- Party: BJP
- Elected year: 2025

Madipur is one of the 70 Delhi Legislative Assembly constituencies of the National Capital Territory in northern India.

== Overview ==
The present geographical structure of Madipur constituency came into existence in 2008 as a part of the implementation of the recommendations of the Delimitation Commission of India, which was constituted in 2002. Madipur is part of West Delhi Lok Sabha constituency along with nine other Assembly segments, namely, Uttam Nagar, Rajouri Garden, Hari Nagar, Tilak Nagar, Janakpuri, Vikaspuri, Dwarka, Matiala and Najafgarh.

== Madipur Village ==
Madipur Village is a census town and a village in West Delhi Tehsil in West Delhi District of Delhi State, India. It is located 8 km to the east of District headquarters Rajouri Garden, 5 km from West Delhi, 12 km from State capital Delhi. Madipur Village Pin code is 110063 and postal head office is Paschim Vihar. Paschim Vihar (2 km), Basai Dara Pur (3 km), Khyala village (3 km), Rajouri Garden (3 km), Sunder Vihar (3 km) are the nearby villages to Madipur Village. Madipur Village is surrounded by North West Delhi Tehsil to the north, Central Delhi Tehsil to the east, North Delhi Tehsil to the east, Bahadurgarh Tehsil to the west. Madipur is a big Yadav dominated village. Shri "Jaildar Udmi Singh Yadav" was the most dominant person of this village during 1900s. Most of the Madipur agricultural land was acquired by the DDA to develop this Area including ncluding Punjabi Bagh West, Paschim Puri, Shyam Sidha Colony, Arihant Nagar, Madipur Colony Ordinance Depot Madipur, and Shivaji Park. It is famous for a pandavas era self originated shivling which is a source of pilgrimage to lakhs of devotees. Every year during shivratri festival it hosts a large fair near the temple. This village is one of leading manufacturing centres of handmade female footwear in India.

== Members of the Legislative Assembly ==
Year	Member	Party
1993	Swarup Chand Rajan	Bharatiya Janata Party
1998	Mala Ram Gangwal	Indian National Congress
2003	Mala Ram Gangwal	Indian National Congress
2008	Mala Ram Gangwal	Indian National Congress
2013	Girish Soni	Aam Aadmi Party
2015	Girish Soni	Aam Aadmi Party
2020	Girish Soni	Aam Aadmi Party
2025	Kailash Gangwal	Bharatiya Janata Party

== Election results ==
=== 2025 ===
Delhi Assembly elections, 2025: Madipur
Party	Candidate	Votes	%	±%
BJP	Kailash Gangwal	52,019	46.07	
AAP	Rakhi Birla	41,120	36.42	
INC	Jai Prakash Panwar	17,958	15.90	
NOTA	None of the above	778	0.69	
Majority		10,899	9.65	
Turnout		1,12,890		
BJP gain from AAP		Swing		

=== 2020 ===
Delhi Assembly elections, 2020: Madipur
Party	Candidate	Votes	%	±%
AAP	Girish Soni	64,440	56.00	−1.24
BJP	Kailash Sankla	41,721	36.26	+4.29
INC	Jai Prakash Panwar	6,788	5.90	−2.99
NOTA	None of the above	517	0.45	−0.06
Majority		22,719	19.74	−5.53
Turnout		1,15,157	65.79	−5.52
AAP hold		Swing	-1.24	

=== 2015 ===
Delhi Assembly elections, 2015: Madipur
Party	Candidate	Votes	%	±%
AAP	Girish Soni	66,571	57.24	+21.27
BJP	Raj Kumar	37,184	31.97	−2.91
INC	Mala Ram Gangwal	10,350	8.89	−16.36
BSP	Lala Ram	600	0.51	−1.63
NOTA	None of the above	601	0.51	−0.31
Majority		29,387	25.27	+24.18
Turnout		1,16,313	71.31	
AAP hold		Swing	+21.27	

=== 2013 ===
Delhi Assembly elections, 2013: Madipur
Party	Candidate	Votes	%	±%
AAP	Girish Soni	36,393	35.97	
BJP	Kailash Sankla	35,290	34.88	−3.65
INC	Mala Ram Gangwal	25,545	25.25	−23.50
BSP	Mishri Lal Khorwal	2,169	2.14	−9.04
IDP	Tara Chand	464	0.46	
Independent	Lalit Kumar Johar	269	0.27	
Independent	Mala Ram	190	0.19	−0.59
NOTA	None	848	0.84	
Majority		1,103	1.09	−9.13
Turnout		101,226	68.09	
AAP gain from INC		Swing		

=== 2008 ===
Delhi Assembly elections, 2008: Madipur
Party	Candidate	Votes	%	±%
INC	Mala Ram Gangwal	40,698	48.75	−2.21
BJP	Kailash Sankla	32,166	38.53	−2.74
BSP	Mohan Lal	9,337	11.18	
Independent	Mala Ram	649	0.78	
Independent	Nirmala	392	0.47	
Independent	Deepak Kumar	241	0.29	
Majority		8,532	10.22	+0.53
Turnout		83,483	58.4	+3.20
INC hold		Swing	-2.21	

=== 2003 ===
Delhi Assembly elections, 2003: Madipur
Party	Candidate	Votes	%	±%
INC	Mala Ram Gangwal	33,329	50.96	−4.42
BJP	Kailash	26,990	41.27	−0.79
SP	Radhey Shyam	2,328	3.56	
Independent	Naval Kishore Bilunia	1,891	2.89	
INLP	Kalu Ram	382	0.58	
Independent	Rohtash	316	0.48	
Independent	Kushal Chand	170	0.26	
Majority		6,339	9.69	−3.63
Turnout		65,406	55.20	+3.26
INC hold		Swing	-4.42	

=== 1998 ===
Delhi Assembly elections, 1998: Madipur
Party	Candidate	Votes	%	±%
INC	Mala Ram Gangwal	33,639	55.38	+12.91
BJP	Laxman Singh Atal	25,543	42.06	−9.04
BSP	Roop Singh Ahirwar	1,184	1.95	+1.04
Independent	Naval Kishore	183	0.30	
RPI	Om Prakash Phulwaria	146	0.24	+0.10
SS	K R Sunda	42	0.07	
Majority		8,096	13.32	+4.69
Turnout		60,737	51.94	−11.48
INC hold		Swing	+12.91	

=== 1993 ===
Delhi Assembly elections, 1993: Madipur
Party	Candidate	Votes	%	±%
BJP	Swarup Chand Rajan	28,861	51.10	
INC	Mala Ram Gangwal	23,986	42.47	
JD	B L Gautam	1,797	3.18	
CPI	Kanta Devi	886	1.57	
BSP	Roop Singh Ahirwar	512	0.91	
Independent	Shambhu Prasad	96	0.17	
RPI	Khoob Ram Khorwal	81	0.14	
Independent	Raj Kumar	72	0.13	
Independent	Prahalad Rai	58	0.10	
SP	P D Aditya	53	0.09	
Doordarshi Party	Ram Maruti	48	0.08	
Independent	Puran Chand Sakkarwal	33	0.06	
Majority		4,875	8.63	
Turnout		56,483	63.42	
BJP hold		Swing		
