= Kailash Gangwal =

Indian politician

Delhi Legislative Assembly
- Incumbent
- Assumed office 8 February 2025
- Preceded by: Girish Soni
- Constituency: Madipur

Personal details
- Party: Bharatiya Janta Party
- Occupation: Politician

Kailash Gangwal is an Indian politician from Delhi and a member of the BJP. He was elected to the Delhi Legislative Assembly in the 2025 election, representing Madipur Assembly constituency.
