= Mala Ram Gangwal =

Indian politician

Member of Legislative Assembly Mala Ram Gangwal
- In office 1998–2013
- Preceded by: Swarup Chand Rajan
- Succeeded by: Girish Soni
- Constituency: Madipur

Personal details
- Born: August 14, 1949 (age 76)
- Party: Indian National Congress
- Profession: Politician

Mala Ram Gangwal (born 14 August 1949), is an Indian politician, belonging to Indian National Congress. He is a member of the Delhi Legislative Assembly representing Madipur constituency, a seat he has won three times.

== Post held ==
Political title
Year	Post	Constituency
1983-1991	Municipal Corporator from Delhi	Madipur

== Post held ==
Political title
Year	Post	Constituency
1998-2003	Member of Legislative Assembly	Madipur
2003-2008	Member of Legislative Assembly	Madipur
2008-2013	Member of Legislative Assembly	Madipur
