= First Kejriwal ministry =

Cabinet of the Delhi Legislative Assembly

- 9th Ministry of Delhi
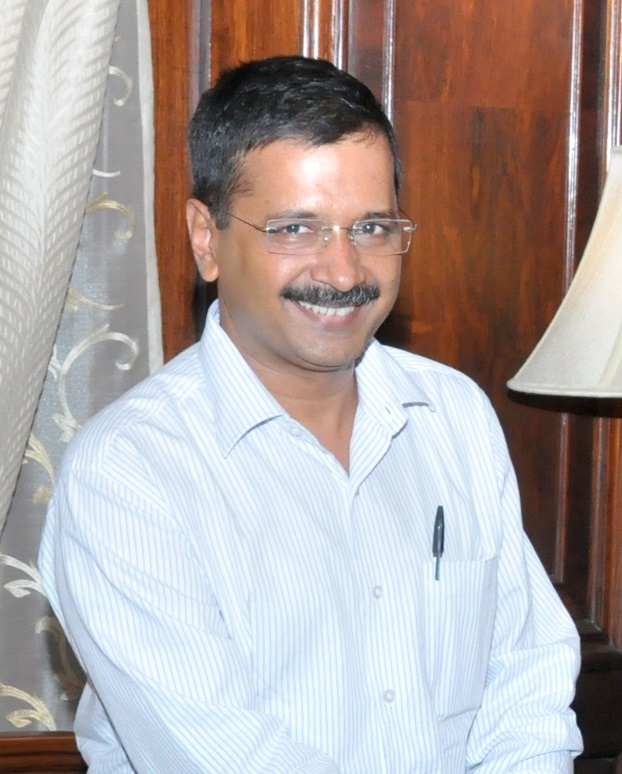
- Arvind Kejriwal
- Date formed: 28 December 2013
- Date dissolved: 14 February 2014

People and organisations
- Head of state: Lt Governor Najeeb Jung
- Head of government: Arvind Kejriwal
- Member parties: Aam Aadmi Party
- Status in legislature: Minority, with outside support of Indian National Congress

History
- Election: December 2013
- Legislature term: 49 days
- Predecessor: Third Dikshit ministry
- Successor: Second Kejriwal ministry

The First Kejriwal cabinet was the Council of Ministers in fifth Delhi Legislative Assembly headed by Chief Minister Arvind Kejriwal.

== History ==
Kejriwal was then sworn in as 7th Chief Minister of Delhi on 28 December, leading the First Kejriwal cabinet, the youngest cabinet in Delhi ever. M. S. Dhir was elected as the speaker of the legislative assembly on 3 January 2014.

Amongst its first tasks, the AAP initiated a corruption response mechanism in a "durbar"; it also retracted the FDI in multi-brand retail that the previous government had sanctioned. Kejriwal said that though this would give consumers more options it has been shown that it "leads to loss of jobs to a very large extent. There is huge unemployment in Delhi and the AAP government does not wish to increase this unemployment. Delhi is not prepared for FDI." Yet he added that he was not against FDI by itself but that it needed to occur on a case-by-case basis.

=== Government resignation ===
After 49 days, Kejriwal resigned as a chief minister following the failure of the introduction of Delhi's Jan Lokpal Bill in the assembly on 14 February 2014. President's rule was then imposed and the assembly was kept in suspended animation. Fresh elections were scheduled for early 2015.

== Council of Ministers (28 December 2013 - 14 February 2014) ==
Portfolio	Minister	Took office	Left office	Party
Chief Minister	Arvind Kejriwal	28 December 2013	14 February 2014	AAP
Education, PWD, Urban Development, Local Bodies, Land & Building	Manish Sisodia	28 December 2013	14 February 2014	AAP
Transport, Food & Supply, Environment, GAD	Saurabh Bhardwaj	28 December 2013	14 February 2014	AAP
Law, Tourism, Administrative Reforms, Art & Culture	Somnath Bharti	28 December 2013	14 February 2014	AAP
Health, Industries	Satyendra Kumar Jain	28 December 2013	14 February 2014	AAP
Women & Child, Social Welfare, Languages	Rakhi Birla	28 December 2013	14 February 2014	AAP
SC & ST, Employment, Development, Labour	Girish Soni	28 December 2013	14 February 2014	AAP
