= Babarpur Assembly constituency =

Constituency of the Delhi legislative assembly in India

Coordinates: 28.688°N 77.283°E

Babarpur
- Constituency No. 67 for the Delhi Legislative Assembly

Constituency details
- Country: India
- Region: North India
- State: Delhi
- District: Shahdara
- Lok Sabha constituency: North East Delhi
- Established: 1951
- Reservation: None

Member of Legislative Assembly
- 8th Delhi Legislative Assembly
- Incumbent Gopal Rai
- Party: Aam Aadmi Party
- Elected year: 2025

Babarpur Assembly constituency is one of the 70 legislative assembly constituencies of Delhi in northern India. Babarpur assembly constituency is a part of North East Delhi (Lok Sabha constituency).

== Members of the Legislative Assembly ==
Election	Name	Party
1993	Naresh Gaur	Bharatiya Janata Party
1998	Naresh Gaur	Bharatiya Janata Party
2003	Vinay Sharma	Indian National Congress
2008	Naresh Gaur	Bharatiya Janata Party
2013	Naresh Gaur	Bharatiya Janata Party
2015	Gopal Rai	Aam Aadmi Party
2020	Gopal Rai	Aam Aadmi Party
2025	Gopal Rai	Aam Aadmi Party

== Election results ==
=== 2025 ===
Delhi Assembly elections, 2025: Babarpur
Party	Candidate	Votes	%	±%
AAP	Gopal Rai	76,192	53.20	▼6.19
BJP	Anil Vashishtha	57,198	39.9	▲3.67
INC	Mohammad Ishraque	8,797	6.1	▲2.51
NOTA	None of the Above	474	0.2	
Majority		18,994	13.3	▼9.86
Turnout		1,42,770	66.2	▲0.43
AAP hold		Swing		

=== 2020 ===
Delhi Assembly elections, 2020: Babarpur
Party	Candidate	Votes	%	±%
AAP	Gopal Rai	84,776	59.39	+0.25
BJP	Naresh Gaur	51,714	36.23	+4.47
INC	Anveeksha Jain	5,131	3.59	−4.14
NOTA	None of the Above	330	0.23	−
BSP	Dharm Singh	211	0.15	−0.44
NCP	Zahid Ali	150	0.11	
Majority		33,062	23.16	−4.22
Turnout		1,42,872	65.77	−1.22
AAP hold		Swing	+0.25	

=== 2015 ===
Delhi Assembly elections, 2015: Babarpur
Party	Candidate	Votes	%	±%
AAP	Gopal Rai	76,179	59.14	+36.77
BJP	Naresh Gaur	40,908	31.76	+2.03
INC	Zakir Khan	9,952	7.73	−18.08
BSP	Mohd. Abdul Haq	765	0.59	−3.78
NOTA	None of the Above	290	0.23	−0.17
Majority		35,271	27.38	+23.46
Turnout		1,28,870	66.99	+1.10
AAP gain from BJP		Swing	+29.41	

=== 2013 ===
Delhi Assembly elections, 2013: Babarpur
Party	Candidate	Votes	%	±%
BJP	Naresh Gaur	34,180	29.73	−5.37
INC	Zakir Khan	29,673	25.81	2.05
AAP	Gopal Rai	25,723	22.37	
PECP	Furkhan	10,017	8.71	
SP	Sunil Vasisht	5,924	5.15	+4.79
BSP	Bhure Khan	5,019	4.37	−26.53
Independent	Shagufta Rani	2,744	2.39	
CPI	Absaar Ahmed	794	0.69	
NOTA	None of the Above	460	0.40	
Majority		4,507	3.92	−0.28
Turnout		1,14,978	65.89	
BJP hold		Swing	-5.37	

=== 2008 ===
Delhi Assembly elections, 2008: Babarpur
Party	Candidate	Votes	%	±%
BJP	Naresh Gaur	31,954	35.10	−4.52
BSP	Hazi Dilshad Ali	28,128	30.90	
INC	Anil Kumar Vashishth	21,632	23.76	−23.76
Independent	Kailash Chand Jain	7,247	7.96	
Independent	Mohd Sher Nabi Chaman	534	0.59	
SP	Mohd Ahmed	324	0.36	−0.94
AGRJP	A K Aggarwal	274	0.30	−0.36
LJP	Raj Kumar Bhati	272	0.30	
Independent	S A Betab	244	0.27	
Independent	Mohd Irfan	161	0.18	
Independent	Abid Khan	98	0.11	
Independent	Inamuddin	88	0.10	
UNLP	Viqar Hashmi	76	0.08	
Majority		3,826	4.20	−3.70
Turnout		91,032	59.7	+6.86
BJP gain from INC		Swing	-4.52	

=== 2003 ===
Delhi Assembly elections, 2003: Babarpur
Party	Candidate	Votes	%	±%
INC	Vinay Sharma	25,630	47.52	+6.39
BJP	Naresh Gaur	21,371	39.62	−3.34
NLP	Mohd Said	2,617	4.85	
Independent	Satya Narain Kaushik	1,479	2.74	
SP	Mohd Jafar	703	1.30	−0.41
Independent	Abdul Kadir	684	1.27	
NCP	S Zaki Haider	374	0.69	
AGRJP	Anil Kumar Sharma	355	0.66	
SS	Arvind Kumar Aggarwal	263	0.49	−0.58
IJP	Ahmad Ali Khan	202	0.37	
ABAC	Surender Kumar	94	0.17	
JKNPP	Nasreen Hamid	83	0.15	
NBNP	Deen Mohd	79	0.15	
Majority		4,259	7.90	+6.07
Turnout		53,934	52.84	+2.45
INC hold		Swing	+6.39	

=== 1998 ===
Delhi Assembly elections, 1998: Babarpur
Party	Candidate	Votes	%	±%
BJP	Naresh Gaur	22,606	42.96	−10.36
INC	Abdul Hameed	21,643	41.13	+26.62
IC(S)	Sunil Vashisht	4,618	8.78	+8.71
RAS	M A Chand	1,007	1.91	
SP	Usha Yadav	899	1.71	
SS	Rakesh	567	1.07	+0.12
BSP	Ram Karan Vishkarma	538	1.02	+0.82
JD	Rasheed Ahmed	233	0.44	+7.13
RUD	Mukesh	166	0.32	+0.26
BKD(J)	Munni Begum	132	0.25	
Independent	Mahender Kumar	71	0.13	
Independent	Kiran Tyagi	45	0.09	
Independent	Uday Kaushik	39	0.07	
Independent	Hazi Abdul Saleem Khan	35	0.07	
Independent	Haseen Ahmed	21	0.04	
Majority		967	1.83	−36.98
Turnout		52,615	50.39	−15.03
BJP hold		Swing	-10.36	

=== 1993 ===
Delhi Assembly elections, 1993: Babarpur
Party	Candidate	Votes	%	±%
BJP	Naresh Gaur	21,023	53.32	
INC	Bhopal Singh	5,722	14.51	
Independent	Rifaqt Ali	4,251	10.78	
Independent	Sunil Vashist	3,241	8.22	
JD	Ishwar Pal	2,985	7.57	
JP	Mangal Sain Gaur	618	1.57	
Independent	G S Kaushik	413	1.05	
SS	Om Dutt	373	0.95	
BMD	Vijender Kumar	248	0.63	
Doordarshi Party	Neera Tyagi	149	0.38	
Independent	Ravinder Malik	120	0.30	
BSP	Pashupati Prasanna Ray	77	0.20	
Independent	Parveen Kumar	58	0.15	
DPP	Madina B Rehman	44	0.11	
Independent	Naresh Kumar	43	0.11	
IC(S)	Buta Ram Sharma	28	0.07	
RUD	Surendra Tyagi	22	0.06	
AIFB	Mahesh Kumar	10	0.03	
Majority		15,301	38.81	
Turnout		39,425	65.42	
BJP hold		Swing		

== See also ==
- First Legislative Assembly of Delhi
- Second Legislative Assembly of Delhi
- Third Legislative Assembly of Delhi
- Fourth Legislative Assembly of Delhi
- Fifth Legislative Assembly of Delhi
- Sixth Legislative Assembly of Delhi
