= Raj Kumar Chauhan =

Indian politician

Member of the Delhi Legislative Assembly
- Incumbent
- Assumed office 8 February 2025
- In office December 1993 – December 2013
- Preceded by: Constituency Established
- Succeeded by: Rakhi Birla
- Constituency: Mangol Puri

Personal details
- Born: 27 March 1957 (age 69) Delhi, India
- Party: Bharatiya Janata Party
- Other political affiliations: Indian National Congress (till 2024)

Raj Kumar Chauhan (born 27 March 1957) is an Indian politician from the Bharatiya Janata Party. He was elected from Mangol Puri constituency to the 1st, 2nd, 3rd and 4th Delhi Legislative Assembly on an Indian National Congress ticket (INC) and is currently serving in 8th as a BJP member, and served as the Minister for Education and Social Welfare from December 2001 to December 2003. He also served as the Minister for Development, Revenue, Irrigation & Flood Control Department, Public Works Department, SC/ST Welfare Department in the Second and Third Sheila Dikshit cabinet.

In May 2024, he, along with Arvinder Singh Lovely, Naseeb Singh and other former INC MLAs, resigned from the Congress and joined the BJP, citing their dissatisfaction with Congress's alliance with the Aam Aadmi Party.

== Electoral performance ==
Delhi Assembly elections, 1993: Mangolpuri
Party	Candidate	Votes	%	±%
INC	Raj Kumar Chauhan	21,344	41.50	
BJP	Soran Singh Nirala	13,681	26.60	
JD	Tej SIngh	7,207	14.01	
BSP	Daya Ram	5,569	10.83	
CPI(M)	Kameshwar Prasad	814	1.58	
Majority		7,663	14.90	
Turnout		51,428	66.77	
INC hold		Swing		

Delhi Assembly elections, 1998: Mangolpuri
Party	Candidate	Votes	%	±%
INC	Raj Kumar Chauhan	32,372	60.80	+19.30
BJP	Lakshmi Narayan	11,358	21.33	−5.27
BSP	Mahender Singh	6,707	12.60	+1.77
RJD	Suraj Pal	1,500	2.82	
JD	Tej Singh	844	1.59	+12.42
Majority		21,014	39.47	+24.57
Turnout		53,240	56.25	−9.52
INC hold		Swing	+19.30	

Delhi Assembly elections, 2003: Mangolpuri
Party	Candidate	Votes	%	±%
INC	Raj Kumar Chauhan	39,147	68.34	+7.54
BSP	Megh Singh	8,832	15.42	+3.82
BJP	Raju Balmiki	8,670	15.14	−6.19
BRP	Shyam Kaur	633	1.11	
Majority		30,315	52.92	+13.45
Turnout		57,282	57.14	+0.89
INC hold		Swing	+7.54	

Delhi Assembly elections, 2008: Mangolpuri
Party	Candidate	Votes	%	±%
INC	Raj Kumar Chauhan	50,448	54.41	−13.93
BJP	Yogesh Aatray	20,585	22.20	+7.06
BSP	Mukesh Kumar Ahlawat	19,971	21.54	+6.12
Majority		29,863	32.19	−10.73
Turnout		92,712	64.7	+7.56
INC hold		Swing	-13.93	

Delhi Assembly elections, 2013: Mangolpuri
Party	Candidate	Votes	%	±%
AAP	Rakhi Birla	44,383	38.42	
INC	Raj Kumar Chauhan	33,798	29.25	−25.16
BJP	Ram Kishor Navariya	31,232	27.03	+4.83
NOTA	None	839	0.73	
Majority		10,585	9.16	−23.05
Turnout		115,719	69.73	
AAP gain from INC		Swing		

Delhi Assembly elections, 2015: Mangolpuri
Party	Candidate	Votes	%	±%
AAP	Rakhi Birla	60,534	46.94	+8.52
INC	Raj Kumar Chauhan	37,835	29.34	+0.09
BJP	Surjeet Kumar	27,889	21.63	−5.40
BSP	Devender Kumar	1,659	1.29	−1.93
NOTA	None	534	0.41	
Majority		22,699	17.60	+8.44
Turnout		1,29,045	72.12	
AAP hold		Swing	+8.52	
