= Naresh Gaur =

Indian politician (born 1952)

Member of the Delhi Legislative Assembly for Babarpur
- In office 29 October 2008 – 2015
- Preceded by: Vinay Sharma
- Succeeded by: Gopal Rai

Personal details
- Born: 5 October 1952 (age 73) Bulandshahr, Uttar Pradesh, India
- Party: Bharatiya Janata Party
- Spouse: Mani Gaur
- Children: Swati, Varun and Arun
- Parent: Sh Raghuveer sharan Gaur. Smt Sanjawati Gaur
- Education: University of Delhi (Bachelor of Arts); Meerut University (Bachelor of Laws)
- Occupation: Advocate

Naresh Gaur (Hindi pronunciation: [nəreʃ ɡəʊɽ]; born 5 October 1952) is an Indian politician and advocate. A member of the Bharatiya Janata Party (BJP), he currently serves as a Member of Legislative Assembly (MLA) in the Delhi Vidhan Sabha from the Babarpur constituency.

Gaur is a graduate of the University of Delhi and Meerut University. He has been elected from Babarpur three times; the only time he lost in 2003. He is married and has three children.

== Early life and education ==
Naresh Gaur was born on 5 October 1952 at Bulandshahr, Uttar Pradesh. He obtained a Bachelor of Arts degree from Shyam Lal College, affiliated with the University of Delhi. He then attended Meerut University (now Chaudhary Charan Singh University), where he graduated with a Bachelor of Laws.

== Political career ==
Gaur is a member of the Bharatiya Janata Party, the main opposition party in the Indian Parliament and Delhi Vidhan Sabha.

He has contested the Babarpur constituency in four consecutive elections. He was elected for the First Legislative Assembly of Delhi in 1993, defeating runner-up Bhopal Singh of Indian National Congress (commonly known as the Congress) by a margin of 15,301 votes. In the 1998 state assembly election, his margin of victory significantly decreased to 963 votes over runner-up Abdul Hameed of Congress. He lost to Congress candidate Vinay Sharma in 2003 by 4,259 votes. In the 2008 state assembly election, he won from Babarpur Vidhan Sabha Constituency third time after defeating runner-up Haji Dilshad Ali of Bahujan Samaj Party by a margin of 3,826 votes.

Before the 2013 state assembly election, scheduled to be held on 4 December, the BJP conducted an internal survey related to potential candidates. The Times of India reported that this found Gaur, along with five other current members of legislative assembly, to be a "weaker bet" for the election. However, Gaur's candidature from Babarpur Constituency was confirmed by the party on 7 November 2013.

== Personal life ==
Gaur is married to Mani Gaur, and together they have two sons (Varun and Arun) and a daughter (Swati). He lives in Naveen Shahdara neighbourhood of Shahdara, North East Delhi. His interests include reading, politics and history. He is an advocate by profession.
