= Dharmender Singh Koli =

Indian politician

Member of the Delhi Legislative Assembly for Seemapuri
- In office 8 December 2013 – 15 February 2015
- Preceded by: Veer Singh Dhingan
- Succeeded by: Rajendra Pal Gautam

Personal details
- Party: Aam Aadmi Party
- Relations: Santosh Koli
- Occupation: Politician

Dharmender Singh Koli is an Indian politician from Delhi affiliated with the Aam Aadmi Party (AAP). He is a former member of the Delhi Legislative Assembly, having been elected in December 2013 from the Seemapuri constituency.

== Early life and education ==
Koli passed the Class 10 All India Secondary School Examination in 2005.

== Political career ==
From 2005 to 2013, Koli had assisted his social activist sister, Santosh Koli, in her work for Parivartan, an organisation that had been established by Arvind Kejriwal and Manish Sisodia. Santosh had been selected by the AAP to contest the seat of Seemapuri in the December 2013 Delhi legislative assembly elections but died following a hit-and-run accident in June 2013. In August, Dharmender was chosen to replace her as the AAP candidate in Seemapuri.

Seemapuri is a socially and economically deprived constituency whose electorate comprises a large population of Muslims, many of whom have their origins in West Bengal. The constituency is reserved for Scheduled Castes and up to 2013 had traditionally elected Indian National Congress (Congress) representatives, although it had received little practical attention from successive governments.

Koli's campaign was funded by the party, largely owing to his political inexperience and financial background. He defeated the incumbent Congress Member of the Legislative Assembly, Veer Singh Dhingan, by 11,976 votes. The Economic Times called this a "shock victory". While his family and party ascribed his success to the popularity of his late sister, many youths among the electorate were reported to have voted for the AAP as a new alternative secular party.

== Allegations ==
Koli and his supporters took part in a victory celebration following declaration of the election results. While doing so, they burst firecrackers around the house of Dhingan. A First Information Report was subsequently filed by Dhingan, alleging that Koli entered the house with AAP supporters and molested women who were inside. The Delhi Police have begun investigations into the allegations of rioting and molestation, which Koli and Arvind Kejriwal have denied and said are politically motivated. Police say that the extent of Koli's involvement, if any, has not yet been determined.

== Personal life ==
Koli is unmarried and resides with his family in a resettlement colony at Sundar Nagari, Delhi, which lies in the Seemapuri constituency. He has an elder sister, Usha.
