= Shikha Roy =

Indian politician

Member of Delhi Legislative Assembly
- Incumbent
- Assumed office 2025
- Preceded by: Saurabh Bharadwaj
- Constituency: Greater Kailash

Personal details
- Party: Bhartiya Janta Party
- Spouse: Sanjeev Pabbi
- Relations: Late Kaka Bhagwant Rai
- Children: 2
- Occupation: Politician
- Profession: Advocate, Supreme Court of India

Shikha Roy is an Indian politician and lawyer from Bharatiya Janata Party, Delhi. She was elected as a Member of the Legislative Assembly in the 8th Delhi Assembly from Greater Kailash Assembly constituency.

== Education ==
Roy completed MA English from a Government College under Punjab University and LLB from Punjab University.
