= Sandeep Kumar (politician) =

Indian politician

Member of the Delhi Legislative Assembly
- In office 14 February 2015 – 31 August 2016
- Preceded by: Jai Kishan
- Succeeded by: Mukesh Kumar Ahlawat
- Constituency: Sultan Pur Majra

Minister for SC/ST Welfare and Women and Child Welfare
- In office 14 February 2015 – 31 August 2016

Personal details
- Born: 12 July 1980 (age 46) Sonipat, Haryana
- Party: Aam Aadmi Party
- Profession: Lawyer, Politician

Sandeep Kumar is an Indian politician who served as minister of SC/ST Welfare and Women and Child Welfare in the Delhi government, under former Chief Minister Arvind Kejriwal. He was the youngest minister in Kejriwal's cabinet during his tenure. He was a member of the Aam Aadmi Party. He represented Sultan Pur Majra (Assembly constituency) in the Sixth Legislative Assembly of Delhi.

Kumar was removed from his cabinet post and expelled from his party by Kejriwal on 31 August 2016 after he allegedly appeared in a sex tape.

== Early life and education ==
Sandeep Kumar is a son of Zile Singh. He is resident in the Sultanpur area in Delhi. He completed his 12th standard in 2001, under the CBSE board of Delhi. He acquired a Bachelor of Arts (BA) from Dyal Singh College, University of Delhi in 2004. He gained an LLB degree from the Chaudhary Charan Singh University, Meerut in 2009. He is married to Ritu Verma, who is a housewife.

== Political career ==
A lawyer, Kumar fought cases for economically and socially backward people, without taking any fees. He first met Arvind Kejriwal, who was later instrumental in founding the AAP, during the India Against Corruption movement in 2012.

Kumar contested the 2013 Delhi Legislative Assembly elections as an AAP member in the Sultan Pur Majra Assembly constituency. He secured 30,346 votes, finishing second to the sitting MLA Jai Kishan of the Indian National Congress (INC), by a margin of 1,112 votes.

The AAP re-nominated Kumar for the constituency in the 2015 Delhi Legislative Assembly elections. He won with 80,269 votes. He defeated Kishan, who finished third, by 64,439 votes. He was described as a "giant killer" by The Financial Express for defeating the four-times elected Kishan.

After the AAP's defeat in Delhi in the 2014 Indian general election, where all seven Delhi seats were won by BJP, Kumar and other volunteers were credited with the revival of the AAP at the grassroots. He conducted several corner meetings and organised door-to-door voter connect campaign to increase the party's voter base in North West Delhi. His elevation as minister of SC/ST Welfare and Women and Child Welfare, in Kejriwal's cabinet was regarded as a recognition of his efforts for the party. The ministry was previously held by Rakhi Birla, who courted controversy in the last Kejriwal cabinet. He was also placed in charge of the social welfare and language ministries. With average age of 42 years, the cabinet was described as the "youngest" in the country, and 34-year-old Kumar was its youngest member.

== Sexual assault allegations ==
Kumar was removed by Delhi Chief Minister Arvind Kejriwal on 31 August 2016 after he received a sex CD showing Kumar in a compromising position having sex with two women. Kumar was arrested by Delhi Police on 3 September 2016 after a woman alleged he had spiked her drink, raped her and secretly filmed her. His membership of the AAP was suspended. He was subsequently expelled from the AAP and in September 2016 was placed in judicial custody for a fortnight. He was granted bail in November 2016, with the judge noting that any trial would have to determine several possible explanations for the actions that were claimed to be rape.

Still a sitting member of the Assembly, it was alleged in April 2017 that Kumar had been voicing support for a BJP candidate in the then municipal council election campaign. The BJP distance themselves from the story, claiming that it was an attempt by the AAP to smear them.

== See also ==
- Delhi Legislative Assembly
- Government of India
- Politics of India

== Electoral performance ==
2020 Delhi Legislative Assembly elections: Sultanpur Majra
Party	Candidate	Votes	%	±%
AAP	Mukesh Kumar Ahlawat	74,573	66.51	−2.99
BJP	Ram Chander Chawriya	26,521	23.65	+9.94
INC	Jai Kishan	9,033	8.06	−4.96
BSP	Neelam	671	0.60	−1.86
NOTA	None of the above	460	0.41	−0.04
Majority		48,052	42.86	−12.93
Turnout		1,12,184	63.88	−4.08
AAP hold		Swing	−2.99	

State Legislative Assembly
Preceded by ?	Member of the Delhi Legislative Assembly from Sultan Pur Majra Assembly constituency 2020–	Incumbent
