= Veer Singh Dhingan =

Indian politician (born 1953)

Member of Legislative Assembly for Seemapuri
- Incumbent
- Assumed office 8 February 2024
- Preceded by: Rajendra Pal Gautam

Member of Legislative Assembly for Seemapuri
- In office 1998–2013
- Preceded by: Balbir Singh
- Succeeded by: Dharmender Singh

Personal details
- Born: 5 August 1953 (age 72)
- Party: Aam Aadmi Party
- Other political affiliations: Indian National Congress (till 2024)

Veer Singh Dhingan (born 5 August 1953) is an Indian politician and current member of Delhi Legislative Assembly from Seemapuri (Assembly constituency) representing the Aam Aadmi Party. He has also been a member of the 2nd, 3rd and 4th Delhi assembly.

== Political career ==
Dhingan represented the Seemapuri constituency from 1998 to 2013, losing to Dharmender Singh Koli in the 2013 Delhi Legislative Assembly election. After the loss, Dhingan alleged that Koli and his supporters took part in a victory celebration following the declaration of the election results. While doing so, they entered Dhingan's house with AAP supporters and molested women who were inside.

In 2024, Dhingan joined the Aam Aadmi Party and won as MLA in 2025 Delhi Legislative Assembly election.
