= Jai Kishan =

Indian politician (1958/1959–2025)

Member of Delhi Legislative Assembly
- In office 2003–2015
- Preceded by: Sushila Devi
- Succeeded by: Sandeep Kumar
- Constituency: Sultanpur Majra
- In office 1993–1998
- Succeeded by: Sushila Devi
- Constituency: Sultanpur Majra

Personal details
- Born: 1958 or 1959
- Died: 17 April 2025 (aged 66) Delhi, India
- Party: Indian National Congress
- Spouse: Sushila Devi
- Children: 2
- Occupation: Politician

Jai Kishan (1958/1959 – 17 April 2025) was an Indian politician belonging to the Indian National Congress. He was a five-time MLA. from Sultan Pur Majra in Delhi.

== Political career ==
Jai Kishan was elected to the First Legislative Assembly of Delhi in 1993. In 2003, he contested again the Third Assembly Elections of Delhi and won by a margin of 18,921 votes, defeating Satish Kumar (BJP). He was elected again in the Fourth and Fifth Assembly Elections of Delhi in 2008 and 2013 respectively.

== Death ==
JaiKishan died from a cardiac arrest at his home in Delhi, on 17 April 2025, at the age of 66.
