= Gopal Rai =

Indian politician

- Cabinet: Kejriwal ministry - III

Cabinet Minister, Government of Delhi
- In office 14 February 2015 – 8 February 2020
- Lieutenant Governor: Najeeb Jung, Anil Baijal, Vinai Kumar Saxena
- Chief Minister: Arvind Kejriwal
- Ministry and Departments: Environment Forest; Wildlife; Development; General Administration
- Preceded by: President's Rule
- Succeeded by: Kapil Mishra
- In office 14 February 2015 – 14 June 2016
- Lieutenant Governor: Najeeb Jung
- Chief Minister: Arvind Kejriwal
- Ministry and Departments: Transport
- Preceded by: President's Rule
- Succeeded by: Kailash Gahlot

Member of the Delhi Legislative Assembly
- Incumbent
- Assumed office 14 February 2015
- Preceded by: Naresh Gaur
- Constituency: Babarpur

Personal details
- Born: 10 May 1975 (age 51) Mau, Uttar Pradesh, India
- Party: Aam Aadmi Party
- Education: Lucknow University (Master of Arts)

Gopal Rai (born 10 May 1975) is an Indian politician from Delhi. He served as the Minister for Environment, Forest & Wildlife, Development and General Administration in Government of Delhi under former Delhi Chief Minister Arvind Kejriwal. He is also social activist, member of Legislative Assembly from Babarpur (Delhi Assembly constituency) and a member of the Political Affairs Committee of the Aam Aadmi Party.

== Background and education ==
Rai is a Post-graduate in Sociology from Lucknow University, 1998. He began his career with the All India Students Association, the student wing of the Communist Party of India (Marxist-Leninist) Liberation, in Lucknow University in 1992. He is a member of the National Executive of the Aam Aadmi Party.

== Political career ==
Rai began his career with All India Students Association in Lucknow University in 1992. He is partially paralyzed as he was shot at during his student days in Lucknow. He and two other members led the "mein bhi aam aadmi" campaign, which started on 10 January and continued till 26 January 2014, for handling fund collection, association, and management of other political groups.

In the 2013 Delhi Legislative Assembly election, he placed third in the Babarpur constituency, with 25,723 votes. He won from Babarpur Assembly constituency in the 2015 Delhi Legislative Assembly election on 10 February 2015 and became the transport and labour minister.

On 13 December 2013, the fourth day of Anna Hazare's indefinite hunger strike for passage of Jan Lokpal bill in Ralegaon Siddhi, a verbal spat between VK Singh and Gopal Rai took place, forcing Anna to ask Rai to leave Ralegaon.

== Electoral performance ==
Delhi Assembly elections, 2013: Babarpur
Party	Candidate	Votes	%	±%
BJP	Naresh Gaur	34,180	29.73	−5.37
INC	Zakir Khan	29,673	25.81	2.05
AAP	Gopal Rai	25,723	22.37	
PECP	Furkhan	10,017	8.71	
SP	Sunil Vasisht	5,924	5.15	+4.79
BSP	Bhure Khan	5,019	4.37	−26.53
Independent	Shagufta Rani	2,744	2.39	
CPI	Absaar Ahmed	794	0.69	
NOTA	None of the Above	460	0.40	
Majority		4,507	3.92	−0.28
Turnout		1,14,978	65.89	
BJP hold		Swing	-5.37	

Delhi Assembly elections, 2015: Babarpur
Party	Candidate	Votes	%	±%
AAP	Gopal Rai	76,179	59.14	+36.77
BJP	Naresh Gaur	40,908	31.76	+2.03
INC	Zakir Khan	9,952	7.73	−18.08
BSP	Mohd. Abdul Haq	765	0.59	−3.78
NOTA	None of the Above	290	0.23	−0.17
Majority		35,271	27.38	+23.46
Turnout		1,28,870	66.99	+1.10
AAP gain from BJP		Swing	+29.41	

Delhi Assembly elections, 2025: Babarpur
Party	Candidate	Votes	%	±%
AAP	Gopal Rai	76,192	53.20	▼6.19
BJP	Anil Vashishtha	57,198	39.9	▲3.67
INC	Mohammad Ishraque	8,797	6.1	▲2.51
NOTA	None of the Above	474	0.2	
Majority		18,994	13.3	▼9.86
Turnout		1,42,770	66.2	▲0.43
AAP hold		Swing		

=== 2020 ===
Delhi Assembly elections, 2020: Babarpur
Party	Candidate	Votes	%	±%
AAP	Gopal Rai	84,776	59.39	+0.25
BJP	Naresh Gaur	51,714	36.23	+4.47
INC	Anveeksha Jain	5,131	3.59	−4.14
NOTA	None of the Above	330	0.23	−
BSP	Dharm Singh	211	0.15	−0.44
NCP	Zahid Ali	150	0.11	
Majority		33,062	23.16	−4.22
Turnout		1,42,872	65.77	−1.22
AAP hold		Swing	+0.25	

Aam Aadmi Party political offices
New political party	Member of Political Affairs Committee of AAP ? – present	Incumbent

State Legislative Assembly
Preceded by ?	Member of the Delhi Legislative Assembly from Babarpur Assembly constituency 2020–	Incumbent
