= Greater Kailash Assembly constituency =

Constituency of the Delhi legislative assembly in India

Coordinates: 28.547°N 77.238°E

Greater Kailash
- Constituency No. 50 for the Delhi Legislative Assembly

Constituency details
- Country: India
- Region: North India
- State: Delhi
- District: New Delhi
- Lok Sabha constituency: New Delhi
- Reservation: None

Member of Legislative Assembly
- 8th Delhi Legislative Assembly
- Incumbent Shikha Roy
- Party: Bharatiya Janata Party
- Elected year: 2025

Greater Kailash Assembly constituency is one of the seventy Delhi assembly constituencies of Delhi in northern India. Greater Kailash assembly constituency is a part of New Delhi (Lok Sabha constituency). This constituency was created by reorganization by delimitation commission in 2008.

== Members of the Legislative Assembly ==
Year	Member	Party
2008	Vijay Kumar Malhotra	Bharatiya Janata Party
2013	Saurabh Bhardwaj	Aam Aadmi Party
2015	Saurabh Bhardwaj	Aam Aadmi Party
2020	Saurabh Bhardwaj	Aam Aadmi Party
2025	Shikha Roy	Bharatiya Janata Party

== Election results ==
=== 2025 ===
Delhi Assembly elections, 2025: Greater Kailash
Party	Candidate	Votes	%	±%
BJP	Shikha Roy	49,594	47.74	▲7.61
AAP	Saurabh Bharadwaj	46,406	44.67	▼10.95
INC	Garvit Singhvi	6,711	6.46	▲3.38
NOTA	None of the above	671	0.64	▲0.10
Majority		3,188	3.07	▼12.41
Turnout		103,884		
BJP gain from AAP		Swing		

=== 2020 ===
Delhi Assembly elections, 2020: Greater Kailash
Party	Candidate	Votes	%	±%
AAP	Saurabh Bharadwaj	60,372	55.62	+2.32
BJP	Shikha Roy	43,563	40.13	+0.33
INC	Sukhbir Singh Panwar	3,339	3.08	−2.56
PBI	Shobha Dhar	282	0.26	N/A
BSP	Rajbir Singh	214	0.20	−0.02
NOTA	None of the above	586	0.54	+0.13
Majority		16,809	15.48	+1.98
Turnout		1,08,064	60.12	−6.57
AAP hold		Swing	+2.32	

=== 2015 ===
Delhi Assembly elections, 2015: Greater Kailash
Party	Candidate	Votes	%	±%
AAP	Saurabh Bharadwaj	57,589	53.30	+8.04
BJP	Rakesh Kumar Gullaiya	43,006	39.80	+8.29
INC	Sharmistha Mukherjee	6,102	5.64	−15.06
NOTA	None of the above	443	0.41	−0.26
Majority		14,583	13.50	−0.25
Turnout		1,08,085	66.69	
Registered electors		1,62,072		
AAP hold		Swing	+8.04	

=== 2013 ===
Delhi Assembly elections, 2013: Greater Kailash
Party	Candidate	Votes	%	±%
AAP	Saurabh Bhardwaj	43,097	45.26	N/A
BJP	Ajay Kumar Malhotra	30,005	31.51	−21.43
INC	Virender Kasana	19,714	20.70	−18.17
BSP	Mukesh Bhardwaj	912	0.96	−4.67
NOTA	None of the Above	639	0.67	N/A
Majority		13,092	13.75	+0.32
Turnout		95,261	66.15	
AAP gain from BJP		Swing		

=== 2008 ===
Delhi Assembly elections, 2008: Greater Kailash
Party	Candidate	Votes	%	±%
BJP	Vijay Kumar Malhotra	42,206	52.94	
INC	Jitender Kumar Kocher	30,987	38.87	
BSP	Rajendra Kumar Gupta	4,486	5.63	
Majority		11,219	14.07	
Turnout		79,722	54.40	
BJP win (new seat)				
