= Saurabh Bhardwaj =

Indian politician

Saurabh Bharadwaj

Cabinet Minister, Government of Delhi
- In office 9 March 2023 – 8 February 2025
- Lieutenant Governor: Vinai Kumar Saxena
- Chief Minister: Arvind Kejriwal, Atishi
- Ministry and Departments: Home; Health; Power; Water; Industries; Urban development; Irrigation; Flood Control
- Preceded by: Satyendra Kumar Jain
- Succeeded by: Pankaj Kumar Singh
- In office 28 December 2013 – 14 February 2014
- Lieutenant Governor: Najeeb Jung
- Ministry and Departments: Transport; Food & Supply; Environment; GAD
- Preceded by: Ramakant Goswami
- Succeeded by: President's rule

Member of Delhi Legislative Assembly
- In office 14 February 2015 – 08 February 2025
- Preceded by: President's rule
- Succeeded by: Shikha Roy
- In office 28 December 2013 – 14 February 2014
- Preceded by: Vijay Kumar Malhotra
- Succeeded by: President's rule
- Constituency: Greater Kailash (Delhi Assembly constituency)

President, Aam Aadmi Party, Delhi
- Incumbent
- Assumed office 21 March 2025

Vice Chairman of Delhi Jal Board
- In office 22 March 2022 – 2024
- Preceded by: Raghav Chadha
- Succeeded by: Somnath Bharti

Personal details
- Born: 12 December 1979 (age 46) New Delhi, India
- Party: Aam Aadmi Party
- Spouse: Shivani Bharadwaj
- Education: Bharati Vidyapeeth's College of Engineering, Computer Science, Osmania University

Saurabh Bharadwaj is an Indian politician from the Aam Aadmi Party, who represented Greater Kailash constituency in the Delhi Legislative Assembly, who was formerly the Chairman of the Delhi Jal Board and Minister of Health, Urban Development and Water. He is also an Official Spokesperson of the Aam Aadmi Party.

== Early life and education ==
Bharadwaj was born in New Delhi and completed his schooling in the city. He graduated as a Computer Science engineer from Bharati Vidyapeeth's College of Engineering affiliated with Guru Gobind Singh Indraprastha University in 2003. He has also completed a bachelor's degree in law from Osmania University in 2011. Before entering politics, Bhardwaj worked with Johnson Controls India, his expertise being in microchips and coding. Bhardwaj started his career as a software engineer in Invensys.

== Political career ==
Saurabh Bhardwaj won the Greater Kailash assembly constituency, defeating Ajay Kumar Malhotra, son of the senior Bharatiya Janata Party leader and incumbent Leader of Opposition V.K. Malhotra, by 13092 votes in the 2013 Delhi Assembly election. In 2015, the young AAP leader defeated Rakesh Guliya of BJP by 14,583 votes. Bhardwaj was a Cabinet Minister in the Arvind Kejriwal government during the 49-day tenure between 28 December 2013 and 14 February 2014.

Bhardwaj shot to fame on 9 May, when he claimed to hack a look-alike machine similar to EVM (Electronic voting machine) allegedly used by the Election Commission. The AAP used the hacking by Bhardwaj to substantiate its claims of EVM tampering during recent elections. The Election Commission later claimed that it cannot take responsibility for any machine that is not under its own security systems and rejected the hacking attempt by Bhardwaj.

Saurabh Bhardwaj has been appointed Chief Spokesperson for Delhi unit of AAP.

On 28 June 2017, Bhardwaj filed a complaint to the Assembly Speaker against Bharatiya Janata Party MLA Manjinder Singh Sirsa for accusing the Delhi Petitions Committee of allegedly blackmailing officials. On 5 October 2024, he and some of his friends were arrested for disorderly behaviour.

Bharadwaj lost the 2025 Delhi Legislative Assembly election from Greater Kailash to BJP's Shikha Roy by a margin of 3,188 votes.

In March 2025, he was appointed as the President of the AAP Delhi unit.

=== Legal issues ===
The Enforcement Directorate (ED) raided AAP leader Saurabh Bhardwaj’s residence on August 26, 2025, over a money-laundering case linked to hospital construction irregularities. Searches were carried out at 13 locations across Delhi-NCR as part of the probe. The Aam Aadmi Party dismissed the action as politically motivated, calling the case “fake.”

On 14 May 2026, the Delhi High Court Judge Swarana Kanta Sharma initiated criminal contempt proceedings against 06 AAP leaders, Arvind Kejriwal, Manish Sisodia, Sanjay Singh, Vinay Mishra, Durgesh Pathak and Saurabh Bharadwaj. She said that they had posted defamatory, contemptuous and vilifying things against her, calling it contemptuous of Court. On 19 May, the Delhi High Court issued notice to these leaders in the given criminal contempt proceedings.

== Positions held ==
Year	Description
2013 - 2014	Elected to 5th Delhi Assembly from Greater Kailash: Cabinet Minister for Transport, Food & Supply, Environment and GAD (28 December 2013 – 14 February 2014)
2015 - 2020	Elected to 6th Delhi Assembly from Greater Kailash
2020 - 2025	Elected to 7th Delhi Assembly from Greater Kailash: Cabinet Minister for Home, Health, Power, Water, Industries, Urban development, Irrigation and Flood Control (9 March 2023 – 8 February 2025)

State Legislative Assembly
Preceded by Vijay Kumar Malhotra	Member of the Delhi Legislative Assembly from Greater Kailash Assembly constituency 2013, 2015, 2020 – 2025	Succeeded by Shikha Roy
Aam Aadmi Party political offices
Preceded by -	Chief Spokesperson; May 2017 – present	Incumbent
