= Mangolpuri Assembly constituency =

Constituency of the Delhi legislative assembly in India

Coordinates: 28.69°N 77.06°E

Mangolpuri
- Constituency No. 12 for the Delhi Legislative Assembly

Constituency details
- Country: India
- Region: North India
- Union Territory: Delhi
- District: North West Delhi
- Lok Sabha constituency: North West Delhi
- Established: 1993
- Reservation: SC

Member of Legislative Assembly
- 8th Delhi Legislative Assembly
- Incumbent Raj Kumar Chauhan
- Party: BJP
- Elected year: 2025

Mangolpuri is one of the seventy Delhi assembly constituencies of Delhi in northern India. Mangolpuri assembly constituency is a part of North West Delhi Lok Sabha constituency.

== Members of the Legislative Assembly ==
Year	Name	Party
1993	Raj Kumar Chauhan	Indian National Congress
1998	Raj Kumar Chauhan	Indian National Congress
2003	Raj Kumar Chauhan	Indian National Congress
2008	Raj Kumar Chauhan	Indian National Congress
2013	Rakhi Birla	Aam Aadmi Party
2015	Rakhi Birla	Aam Aadmi Party
2020	Rakhi Birla	Aam Aadmi Party
2025	Raj Kumar Chauhan	Bharatiya Janata Party

== Election results ==
=== 2025 ===
Delhi Assembly elections, 2025
Party	Candidate	Votes	%	±%
BJP	Raj Kumar Chauhan	62,007		
AAP	Rakesh Jatav	55,752		
INC	Hanuman Chauhan	3784		
NOTA	None of the above	762		
Majority		6255		
Turnout		1,23,450		
BJP gain from AAP		Swing		

=== 2020 ===
Delhi Assembly elections, 2020: Mangolpuri
Party	Candidate	Votes	%	±%
AAP	Rakhi Birla	74,154	58.53	+11.59
BJP	Karam Singh Karma	44,038	34.76	+13.13
INC	Rajesh Lilothia	4,073	3.22	−26.12
BSP	Murari Lal	2,491	1.97	+0.68
NOTA	None	657	0.52	+0.11
Majority		30,116	23.77	+6.17
Turnout		1,26,798	66.48	−5.59
AAP hold		Swing	+11.59	

=== 2015 ===
Delhi Assembly elections, 2015: Mangolpuri
Party	Candidate	Votes	%	±%
AAP	Rakhi Birla	60,534	46.94	+8.52
INC	Raj Kumar Chauhan	37,835	29.34	+0.09
BJP	Surjeet Kumar	27,889	21.63	−5.40
BSP	Devender Kumar	1,659	1.29	−1.93
NOTA	None	534	0.41	
Majority		22,699	17.60	+8.44
Turnout		1,29,045	72.12	
AAP hold		Swing	+8.52	

=== 2013 ===
Delhi Assembly elections, 2013: Mangolpuri
Party	Candidate	Votes	%	±%
AAP	Rakhi Birla	44,383	38.42	
INC	Raj Kumar Chauhan	33,798	29.25	−25.16
BJP	Ram Kishor Navariya	31,232	27.03	+4.83
NOTA	None	839	0.73	
Majority		10,585	9.16	−23.05
Turnout		115,719	69.73	
AAP gain from INC		Swing		

=== 2008 ===
Delhi Assembly elections, 2008: Mangolpuri
Party	Candidate	Votes	%	±%
INC	Raj Kumar Chauhan	50,448	54.41	−13.93
BJP	Yogesh Aatray	20,585	22.20	+7.06
BSP	Mukesh Kumar Ahlawat	19,971	21.54	+6.12
Majority		29,863	32.19	−10.73
Turnout		92,712	64.7	+7.56
INC hold		Swing	-13.93	

=== 2003 ===
Delhi Assembly elections, 2003: Mangolpuri
Party	Candidate	Votes	%	±%
INC	Raj Kumar Chauhan	39,147	68.34	+7.54
BSP	Megh Singh	8,832	15.42	+3.82
BJP	Raju Balmiki	8,670	15.14	−6.19
BRP	Shyam Kaur	633	1.11	
Majority		30,315	52.92	+13.45
Turnout		57,282	57.14	+0.89
INC hold		Swing	+7.54	

=== 1998 ===
Delhi Assembly elections, 1998: Mangolpuri
Party	Candidate	Votes	%	±%
INC	Raj Kumar Chauhan	32,372	60.80	+19.30
BJP	Lakshmi Narayan	11,358	21.33	−5.27
BSP	Mahender Singh	6,707	12.60	+1.77
RJD	Suraj Pal	1,500	2.82	
JD	Tej Singh	844	1.59	+12.42
Majority		21,014	39.47	+24.57
Turnout		53,240	56.25	−9.52
INC hold		Swing	+19.30	

=== 1993 ===
Delhi Assembly elections, 1993: Mangolpuri
Party	Candidate	Votes	%	±%
INC	Raj Kumar Chauhan	21,344	41.50	
BJP	Soran Singh Nirala	13,681	26.60	
JD	Tej SIngh	7,207	14.01	
BSP	Daya Ram	5,569	10.83	
CPI(M)	Kameshwar Prasad	814	1.58	
Majority		7,663	14.90	
Turnout		51,428	66.77	
INC hold		Swing		
