= Sultanpur Majra Assembly constituency =

Constituency of the Delhi legislative assembly in India

Coordinates: 28.696°N 77.081°E

Sultanpur Majra
- Constituency No. 10 for the Delhi Legislative Assembly

Constituency details
- Country: India
- Region: North India
- State: Delhi
- District: North West Delhi
- Established: 1993
- Reservation: SC

Member of Legislative Assembly
- 8th Delhi Legislative Assembly
- Incumbent Mukesh Kumar Ahlawat
- Party: Aam Aadmi Party
- Elected year: 2025

Sultanpur Majra is one of the seventy Delhi assembly constituencies of Delhi in northern India. Sultan Pur Majra assembly constituency is a part of North West Delhi Lok Sabha constituency.

== Members of the Legislative Assembly ==
Year	Member	Party
1993	Jai Kishan	Indian National Congress
1998	Sushila Devi	Indian National Congress
2003	Jai Kishan	Indian National Congress
2008	Jai Kishan	Indian National Congress
2013	Jai Kishan	Indian National Congress
2015	Sandeep Kumar	Aam Aadmi Party
2020	Mukesh Kumar Ahlawat	Aam Aadmi Party
2025	Mukesh Kumar Ahlawat	Aam Aadmi Party

== Election results ==
=== 2025 ===
Delhi Assembly elections, 2025: Sultanpur Majra
Party	Candidate	Votes	%	±%
AAP	Mukesh Kumar Ahlawat	58,767	52.09	
BJP	Karam Singh Karma	41,641	36.91	
INC	Jai Kishan	8,688		−
NOTA	None of the above	494		−
Majority		17,126		−
Turnout		1,12,825		−
AAP hold		Swing	−	

=== 2020 ===
2020 Delhi Legislative Assembly elections: Sultanpur Majra
Party	Candidate	Votes	%	±%
AAP	Mukesh Kumar Ahlawat	74,573	66.51	−2.99
BJP	Ram Chander Chawriya	26,521	23.65	+9.94
INC	Jai Kishan	9,033	8.06	−4.96
BSP	Neelam	671	0.60	−1.86
NOTA	None of the above	460	0.41	−0.04
Majority		48,052	42.86	−12.93
Turnout		1,12,184	63.88	−4.08
AAP hold		Swing	−2.99	

=== 2015 ===
Delhi Assembly elections, 2015: Sultanpur Majra
Party	Candidate	Votes	%	±%
AAP	Sandeep Kumar	80,269	69.50	+40.76
BJP	Parbhu Dayal	15,830	13.71	−1.32
INC	Jai Kishan	15,036	13.02	−16.77
BSP	Nathu Ram	2,838	2.46	−21.62
SS	Gurdayal Singh	549	0.48	
NOTA	None	521	0.45	
Majority		64,439	55.79	+54.74
Turnout		1,15,531	67.99	
AAP gain from INC		Swing	+28.77	

=== 2013 ===
Delhi Assembly elections, 2013: Sultanpur Majra
Party	Candidate	Votes	%	±%
INC	Jai Kishan	31,458	29.79	−18.40
AAP	Sandeep Kumar	30,346	28.74	
BSP	Mukesh Kumar Ahlawat	25,424	24.08	+1.46
BJP	Sushila Kumari	15,866	15.03	10.40
PGP	Ajay Raj	643	0.61	
LJP	Babu Singh @ Dangi	361	0.34	
IBSP	Bhagat Singh	252	0.24	
NOTA	None	1,232	1.17	
Majority		1,112	1.05	−21.71
Turnout		105,626	66.07	
INC hold		Swing	−18.40	

=== 2008 ===
Delhi Assembly elections, 2008: Sultanpur Majra
Party	Candidate	Votes	%	±%
INC	Jai Kishan	39,542	48.19	−4.08
BJP	Nand Ram Bagri	20,867	25.43	−10.72
BSP	Satya Pal Singh	18,559	22.62	+17.15
ABSP	Mehar Singh	737	0.90	
Independent	Sonu	729	0.89	
ASP	Rajesh	494	0.60	
RPI(A)	Geeta	256	0.31	
Independent	Anil Kumar	256	0.31	
SP	Zile Singh Ranga	253	0.31	
Independent	Pappu Sagar	223	0.27	
IJP	Rajender Khatik	131	0.16	
Majority		18,675	22.76	−4.59
Turnout		82,047	61.9	+3.13
INC hold		Swing	−4.08	

=== 2003 ===
Delhi Assembly elections, 2003: Sultanpur Majra
Party	Candidate	Votes	%	±%
INC	Jai Kishan	36,164	52,27	−4.52
BJP	Satish Kumar	17,243	24.92	−3.75
BSP	Bhagwan Dass	10,812	15.63	+10.51
LJP	Nand Ram Bagri	1,550	2.24	
SP	Mangat Ram	1,139	1.65	
AIFB	Veena	934	1.35	
Independent	Rakesh	567	0.82	
SS	Jai Singh	352	0.51	+0.33
Independent	Babu Lal Bairwa	221	0.32	
Independent	Zile Singh Ranga	207	0.30	
Majority		18,921	27.35	−0.77
Turnout		69,189	58.77	+3.30
INC hold		Swing	−4.52	

=== 1998 ===
Delhi Assembly elections, 1998: Sultanpur Majra
Party	Candidate	Votes	%	±%
INC	Sushila Devi	34,194	56.79	+19.04
BJP	Kailash	17,261	28.67	+5.97
BSP	Kiran Devi	3,085	5.12	−0.11
Independent	Nand Ram Bagri	2,646	4.39	
JD	Ranbir Singh	1,695	2.82	−21.54
Independent	Pradeep Kumar	416	0.69	
MSP	Shubhash	389	0.65	
Lok Shakti	Asha Rani	322	0.53	
SS	Vinod	108	0.18	
SHSP	Kalyani	92	0.15	
Majority		16,933	28.12	+14.73
Turnout		60,208	55.47	−5.78
INC hold		Swing	+19.04	

=== 1993 ===
Delhi Assembly elections, 1993: Sultanpur Majra
Party	Candidate	Votes	%	±%
INC	Jai Kishan	20,890	37.75	
JD	Nand Ram Bagri	13,478	24.36	
BJP	Bhagwan Dass	12,562	22.70	
BSP	Jagdhari Lal	2,893	5.23	
Independent	Mangat Ram	2,252	4.07	
Independent	Nihal Chand	1,337	2.42	
DPP	Ram Sumer Thekedar	1,132	2.05	
Independent	Madan Lal Bairwa	315	0.57	
Independent	Bal Kishan Dulgach	123	0.22	
BLMD	Ram Pal Brajwal	83	0.15	
Independent	Ram Kumar Dabriwal	73	0.13	
Independent	Babu Rao Nagorao Gavai	61	0.11	
Doordarshi Party	Ram Murti	59	0.11	
AIFB	Sher Singh Bedi	48	0.09	
Independent	Manohar Lal	30	0.05	
Majority		7,412	13.39	
Turnout		55,336	61.25	
INC win (new seat)				
