= Rajendra Pal Gautam =

Indian politician

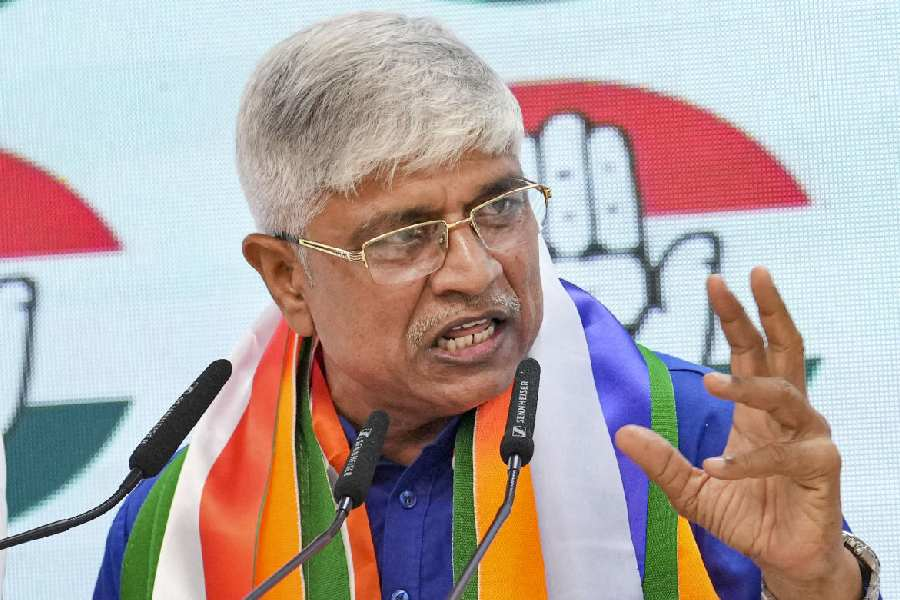

Chairman of SC Department All India Congress Committee
- Incumbent
- Assumed office 4 June 2025
- AICC President: Mallikarjun Kharge
- Preceded by: Rajesh Lilothia

AICC in-charge for Uttar Pradesh Congress Committee
- Incumbent
- Assumed office 26 June 2026
- Preceded by: Avinash Pandey

Cabinet Minister, Government of Delhi
- In office 14 February 2015 – 19 October 2022
- Lieutenant Governor: Najeeb Jung; Anil Baijal; Vinai Kumar Saxena
- Cabinet: Kejriwal ministry - II; Kejriwal ministry - III
- Chief Minister: Arvind Kejriwal
- Ministry and Departments: List: Social Welfare; SC & ST; Cooperative; Gurudwara Elections; Women & Child Development
- Preceded by: President's rule
- Succeeded by: Raaj Kumar Anand

Member of the Delhi Legislative Assembly
- In office 10 February 2015 – 26 September 2024
- Preceded by: Dharmender Singh
- Succeeded by: Veer Singh Dhingan
- Constituency: Seemapuri

Personal details
- Born: 26 April 1968 (age 58) Delhi, India
- Party: Indian National Congress (2024–present)
- Other political affiliations: Aam Aadmi Party (2014–2024)
- Spouse: Sushila Devi
- Children: 2
- Parent: Dalip Singh (father)
- Education: Faculty of Law, University of Delhi
- Occupation: politician and social activis
- Profession: Advocate
- Cabinet: Kejriwal ministry - II, Kejriwal ministry - III

Rajendra Pal Gautam is an Indian politician, Dalit activist, social worker and a former Minister for Water, Tourist, Culture, Arts & Languages and Gurudwara Elections in the Government of Delhi. He is a former member of the Aam Aadmi Party and represented the Seemapuri Assembly constituency in the Delhi Legislative Assembly.

== Early life and education ==
Gautam was born in Delhi. He holds an LL.B. degree from Delhi University and is an advocate by profession. He is an Ambedkarite and Buddhist activist.

== Political career ==
In 2014, he became a member of the Aam Aadmi Party. Gautam's term as an MLA in the Sixth Legislative Assembly of Delhi was his first. He defeated Karamvir of the Bharatiya Janata Party by a margin of 48,821 votes in the 2015 elections. He was re-elected in the 2020 Delhi Legislative Assembly election.

=== Cabinet Minister, Delhi ===
He was a cabinet minister in the Third Kejriwal ministry since 14 February 2015 till 8 October 2022 and held the charge of below listed departments of the Delhi Government.

- Social welfare
- SC & ST
- Cooperative
- Gurudwara Elections
- Women & Child

==== Jai Bheem Mukhyamantri Pratiba Vikas Yojana ====
As minister, Gautam held the charge of social welfare department in the Second Kejriwal ministry. Under his charge Jai Bheem Mukhyamantri Pratiba Vikas Yojana was started. Indian Express noted it as one of Arvind Kejriwal government's most ambitious programmes. In this program, free coaching is provided to children from the Scheduled Castes and Scheduled Tribes to prepare them for IIT JEE, NEET and other competitive exams. When the program started about 4,900 students enrolled for the free coaching classes. in 2022, around 15,000 are enrolled in various courses under this scheme.

=== Controversy ===
In May 2020, he was criticised by the Indian Army for sharing a video curated and circulated by enemy agents. He later took the video down.

== Social activism ==
He taught about 450 children from poor families and worked on reducing addiction among the youth. He worked for upliftment and rights of Dalits. He was awarded the Samata Sainik Dal's Dr Ambedkar Award in 2017.

He operated a Non-governmental organization (NGO) called Partivartan and as of 2022 he runs the organisation, 'Mission Jai Bhim'. Gautam is the founder of the organisation, Mission Jai Bhim.

Rajendra Pal Gautam quit the Aam Aadmi Party (AAP) and stepped down as the legislator of Seemapuri on 6 September 2024 and joined Indian National Congress in the presence of Congress General Secretary K.C Venugopal at AICC HQ in New Delhi.

== Resigned from the post of cabinet minister ==
On 5 October 2022, Buddhist Society of India and Mission Jai Bhim jointly organized an event at Dr. Ambedkar Bhawan Rani Jhansi Road. Gautam attended the event and later said that in the event "more than 10,000 people pledged to join Buddhism and work for making India free from casteism and untouchability." During the event, while Gautam was on stage, the attendees repeated Twenty-two vows that B. R. Ambedkar had administered to his followers. Among other vows it included a vow that they would not pray to Hindu gods and goddesses. The 22-point pledge was first made in 1956 by Dr B. R. Ambedkar when he renounced Hinduism and converted to Buddhism. Since then such events have been organised regularly, where people who are mainly from the oppressed castes, recite the 22 vows and embrace Buddhism.

Indian Express reported that 66 years after the twenty-two vows of Ambedkar were first made, Bharatiya Janata Party (BJP) leaders chose to suddenly take offence to the vows. It was reported that there were no derogatory words for Hindu gods and goddesses in the pledge, but it simply asserts that the speaker shall not worship them. The BJP leaders criticised Gautam for his speech and made legal complaints against him. BJP attacked AAP, AAP president Arvind Kejriwal and Gautam during the campaign for 2022 Gujarat Legislative Assembly election.

Gautam responded saying that BJP was spreading rumours about him and said, "If I believe in Buddhism, what is wrong with that? If the BJP has to complain, they can. The Constitution of India gives us the freedom to follow any religion. The BJP is losing ground and it is afraid of the Aam Aadmi Party. They can only lodge fake cases against us". He said, "I am a very religious person. I personally respect all the gods and goddesses and can never even dream of insulting the deities by my actions or words. I did not say any word towards anyone's faith, I respect everyone's faith. In my speech, I spoke on education, health, employment, inflation and social equality. But then BJP people are spreading false rumors about me. I am deeply hurt by this act of BJP people and I apologize with folded hands to all those people who have been hurt in any way due to this propaganda of BJP".

On 9 October 2022, he resigned from the post of cabinet minister. AAP has not officially responded to the event. He said in his resignation letter that he had noticed that the BJP had been targeting Arvind Kejriwal and the AAP for Gautam's participation in the event. He said that those attacks had saddened him. He said, "I will continue to work for the party to strengthen India and will follow the teachings of Babasaheb Ambedkar all my life. The BJP has a problem with me following the teaching of Babasaheb Ambedkar and is using this to play dirty politics… I do not wish that due to me my leader Mr. Kejriwal and my party are harmed in anyway."

On 10 October 2022, Gautam, shared a video that reportedly showed some Upper caste men beating a Dalit man. Gautam called Narendra Modi "a weak PM" and demanded his resignation and resignation of Uttar Pradesh Chief Minister Yogi Adityanath over the incidents. He said, "Stop these casteist shoddy acts Narendra Modi ji. Otherwise you resign. Chief Minister of Uttar Pradesh is a complete failure in handling law and order. I know that you are such a weak Prime Minister that you can't even take resignation from him! You don't worry, my Bahujan Samaj will answer".

== Electoral performance ==
2015 Delhi Legislative Assembly election: Seemapuri
Party	Candidate	Votes	%	±%
AAP	Rajendra Pal Gautam	79,777	63.04	+25.28
BJP	Karamvir	30,956	24.46	+3.17
INC	Veer Singh Dhingan	10,674	8.44	−18.85
BSP	Jai Shree	4,103	3.24	−7.69
NOTA	None	499	0.39	−0.24
Majority		48,821	38.58	+28.11
Turnout		1,26,640	73.29	
AAP hold		Swing	+25.28	

2020 Delhi Legislative Assembly election: Seemapuri
Party	Candidate	Votes	%	±%
AAP	Rajendra Pal Gautam	88,392	65.82	+2.78
LJP	Sant Lal	32,284	24.04	New
INC	Veer Singh Dhingan	7,661	5.70	−2.74
NOTA	None of the above	1,002	0.75	+0.36
Majority		56,108	41.78	+3.20
Turnout		1,34,437	68.48	−4.81
AAP hold		Swing	+2.78	

== See also ==
- Government of India
- Politics of India

State Legislative Assembly
Preceded by Dharmender Singh Koli	Member of the Delhi Legislative Assembly from Seemapuri Assembly constituency 2020–	Incumbent
Aam Aadmi Party political offices
Preceded by -	Member of National Executive Committee; Aam Aadmi Party – present	Incumbent
