= Girish Soni =

Indian politician

Cabinet Minister Government of Delhi
- In office December 2013 – February 2014
- Chief Minister: Arvind Kejriwal
- Ministry and Departments: SC & ST; Employment; Development and Labour

Member of the Delhi Legislative Assembly for Madipur
- In office 2013–2025

Personal details
- Born: Delhi
- Party: Aam Aadmi Party
- Portfolio: Ex-Cabinet Minister, Government of Delhi

Girish Soni Is an Indian politician of the Aam Aadmi Party and a former cabinet minister of SC & ST, Employment, Development and Labour of Delhi (28 December 2013 – 14 February 2014) under then chief minister Arvind Kejriwal. He was a Member of the Delhi Legislative Assembly (MLA) from the Madipur constituency of Delhi, which he represented from 2013 till 2025.

== Personal life ==
Girish Soni was born on 3 December 1963 in Delhi. His father's name is Babu Lal Soni. Soni completed his 10th standard from Govt. Boys Senior Sec. School, Madipur; under the CBSE board of Delhi. He is educated till 12th standard and could not study further due to financial problems. He did a Refrigeration and Air-conditioning diploma course with Industrial Training Institute (ITI) Pusa, New Delhi in 1982. He is a manufacturer and trader of leather goods and runs a small business under the name of M/S Mascot Leather Craft.

Soni is married to Mamta Soni (who is self-employed). They have two daughters and a son. He likes doing social service, reading and listening to old songs. His father is his inspiration in life.

== Politics ==
Soni was a member of the Bharat Naujawan Sabha in the 1980s and was the general secretary of the party in Madipur assembly constituency.

Soni was part of Bijli Pani Andolan ("electricity water agitation") of the Aam Aadmi Party led by Arvind Kejriwal. It demanded cheap water and electricity for the people of Delhi.

Soni fought the assembly elections of December 2013 from Madipur, which was reserved for Scheduled caste. He polled 36,393 votes and won by a margin of 1,103 over Kailash Sankla of the Bharatiya Janata Party (BJP). He also defeated the three-time and sitting heavyweight MLA Mala Ram Gangwal of the Indian National Congress (INC). He was appointed the cabinet minister of SC & ST, Employment, Development and Labour. Along with Rakhi Birla, he was one of the two Dalit ministers in Delhi cabinet under Chief Minister Arvind Kejriwal. At 49, he was the oldest minister in the cabinet. Soni was a minister for a short tenure of 49 days (28 December 2013 – 14 February 2014); the Kejriwal and his cabinet resigned.

The AAP renominated Soni as the Madipur candidate for the 2015 Delhi Legislative Assembly elections. He secured 66,571 votes and defeated BJP's Raj Kumar by a victory margin of 29,387 votes. The AAP won 67 of the 70 seats. However, Soni was kept out of the new cabinet under Kejriwal.

== Member of Legislative Assembly (2020 - 2025) ==
From 2020 till 2025, he was an elected member of the 7th Delhi Assembly.

Committee assignments of Delhi Legislative Assembly

- Member (2022-2023), Public Accounts Committee

== Electoral performance ==
Delhi Assembly elections, 2020: Madipur
Party	Candidate	Votes	%	±%
AAP	Girish Soni	64,440	56.00	−1.24
BJP	Kailash Sankla	41,721	36.26	+4.29
INC	Jai Prakash Panwar	6,788	5.90	−2.99
NOTA	None of the above	517	0.45	−0.06
Majority		22,719	19.74	−5.53
Turnout		1,15,157	65.79	−5.52
AAP hold		Swing	-1.24	

State Legislative Assembly
Preceded by ?	Member of the Delhi Legislative Assembly from Madipur Assembly constituency 2020– 2025	Succeeded by Kailash Gangwar
