= Mohalla Clinics =

Primary health centres in New Delhi, India

Aam Aadmi Mohalla Clinics (AAMC), more popularly known as Mohalla Clinics, are primary health centres in the union territory of Delhi and the state of Punjab, India. They offer health services, including medicines, diagnostics, and consultations, for free. The word mohalla in Hindi means "neighborhood" or "community". The main purpose of these clinics is to serve as the first point of contact for patients at health facilities.

== Background ==
Mohalla Clinics were first set up by the Aam Aadmi Party (AAP) government in October 2015, and as of August 23, 2023, 533 clinics had been set up. The government had promised to set up 1,000 clinics in the city before the 2020 Delhi Legislative Assembly election. According to World Health Organization data for the year 2015, more than 65% of the population in India paid for health services with their own money. The Hindu reported in 2017 that only 17% of people in the country have health insurance.

The idea behind the Mohalla Clinics initiative is to reduce the financial burden on low-income households by saving travel costs and lost wages.

== Reception ==
The former Secretary-General of the United Nations, Kofi Annan, who is also the chairperson of The Elders (founded by Nelson Mandela), wrote a letter to the Chief Minister of Delhi, Arvind Kejriwal, praising the Mohalla Clinic project.

The project was also praised by the former Prime Minister of Norway, Gro Harlem Brundtland, at the Prince Mahidol Award Conference in Bangkok, after a presentation by Delhi health minister Satyendra Kumar Jain.

The Straits Times finds that Mohalla Clinics results were known within two minutes and were uploaded onto an IT cloud for access by patients and doctors on their smartphones and the clinic's tablets.

In a report published by The Washington Post, it suggests, "It may well be time for America to build Mohalla Clinics in its cities". However, the writer of the article later criticized the AAP government for misinterpretation of his words as well as making false claims in the report.

A vigilance probe in the year 2017 put a question on the quality of healthcare being received by the patients, with every doctor treating two patients per minute, which comes out to a patient only getting 36 seconds to state their ailment and get treatment.

Instances of untouchability issues have been reported to exist in some forms at the AAMC;

health practitioners overwhelmingly and disproportionately belong to [the] upper and middle castes, who often exhibit discrimination towards the lower castes. Researchers found large-scale segregation within slums, most notably against Dalits, particularly Valmikis and Chamars, which has led to discrimination in terms of healthcare access as some of the upper-caste house-owners stop people from oppressed castes from entering clinics operating on their property.

In December 2017, a cardiac surgeon Dr. Devi Prasad Shetty, from Karnataka, visiting a Mohalla Clinic in Todapur, Delhi was amazed by the healthcare facilities provided by the Delhi Government.

In 2022, the Bhagwant Mann-led government said that 75 such clinics would also be opened in Punjab.
