= Seemapuri Assembly constituency =

Constituency of the Delhi legislative assembly in India

Coordinates: 28.689°N 77.328°E

Seemapuri
- Constituency No. 63 for the Delhi Legislative Assembly

Constituency details
- Country: India
- Region: North India
- State: Delhi
- District: North East Delhi
- Established: 1993
- Reservation: SC

Member of Legislative Assembly
- 8th Delhi Legislative Assembly
- Incumbent Veer Singh Dhingan
- Party: AAP
- Elected year: 2025

Seemapuri is one of the 70 legislative assembly constituencies of Delhi in Northern India. It is a constituency reserved for scheduled castes. Seemapuri assembly constituency is a part of North East Delhi (Lok Sabha constituency).

== Members of the Legislative Assembly ==
Election	Name	Party
1993	Balbir Singh	Bharatiya Janata Party
1998	Veer Singh Dhingan	Indian National Congress
2003	Veer Singh Dhingan	Indian National Congress
2008	Veer Singh Dhingan	Indian National Congress
2013	Dharmender Singh	Aam Aadmi Party
2015	Rajendra Pal Gautam	Aam Aadmi Party
2020	Rajendra Pal Gautam	Aam Aadmi Party
2025	Veer Singh Dhingan	Aam Aadmi Party

== Election results ==
=== 2025 ===
Delhi Assembly elections, 2025: Seemapuri
Party	Candidate	Votes	%	±%
AAP	Veer Singh Dhingan	66,353	48.44	
BJP	Shushri Kumari Rinku	55,985	40.87	
INC	Rajesh Lilothia	11,823	8.63	
NOTA	None of the above	458		
Majority		10,368		
Turnout		1,36,957		
AAP hold		Swing		

=== 2020 ===
2020 Delhi Legislative Assembly election: Seemapuri
Party	Candidate	Votes	%	±%
AAP	Rajendra Pal Gautam	88,392	65.82	+2.78
LJP	Sant Lal	32,284	24.04	New
INC	Veer Singh Dhingan	7,661	5.70	−2.74
NOTA	None of the above	1,002	0.75	+0.36
Majority		56,108	41.78	+3.20
Turnout		1,34,437	68.48	−4.81
AAP hold		Swing	+2.78	

=== 2015 ===
2015 Delhi Legislative Assembly election: Seemapuri
Party	Candidate	Votes	%	±%
AAP	Rajendra Pal Gautam	79,777	63.04	+25.28
BJP	Karamvir	30,956	24.46	+3.17
INC	Veer Singh Dhingan	10,674	8.44	−18.85
BSP	Jai Shree	4,103	3.24	−7.69
NOTA	None	499	0.39	−0.24
Majority		48,821	38.58	+28.11
Turnout		1,26,640	73.29	
AAP hold		Swing	+25.28	

=== 2013 ===
2013 Delhi Legislative Assembly election: Seemapuri
Party	Candidate	Votes	%	±%
AAP	Dharmender Singh	43,199	37.76	
INC	Veer Singh Dhingan	31,223	27.29	−21.84
BJP	Ram Pal Singh	24,356	21.29	−6.27
BSP	Santosh Kumar	12,501	10.93	−5.67
CPI	Ram Prasad Atri	699	0.61	
PECP	Ram Mohan Gautam	470	0.41	
SP	Ram Prakash	431	0.38	
HND	Subash Babu	283	0.25	
Independent	Kishan Pal Vaid	218	0.19	
RPIE	Angan Lal	131	0.11	
NOTA	None	723	0.63	
Majority		11,976	10.47	−11.10
Turnout		114,486	72.63	
AAP gain from INC		Swing	+37.76	

=== 2008 ===
2008 Delhi Legislative Assembly election: Seemapuri
Party	Candidate	Votes	%	±%
INC	Veer Singh Dhingan	43,864	49.13	−1.36
BJP	Chandra Pal Singh	24,604	27.56	+4.86
BSP	Lallan Prasad	14,823	16.60	+5.63
NLHP	Raj Dulari	1,714	1.92	
Independent	Mange Ram	979	1.10	
LJP	Santosh Kumar	940	1.05	
IDP	Devender Kumar	686	0.77	
RWS	Sukkan Lal	675	0.76	
UNLP	Dhani Ram	436	0.49	
Independent	Amardeep	217	0.24	
IJP	Bhagwan Sahai	202	0.23	
VAJP	Vijay Kumar	141	0.16	
Majority		19,260	21.57	−6.22
Turnout		89,281	62.3	+10.28
INC hold		Swing	-1.36	

=== 2003 ===
2003 Delhi Legislative Assembly election: Seemapuri
Party	Candidate	Votes	%	±%
INC	Veer Singh Dhingan	31,051	50.49	−12.77
BJP	Kamala	13,961	22.70	−5.76
BSP	Jai Bhagwan	6,749	10.97	+7.19
NLP	Nand Kishor	5,673	9.23	
SP	Narayan Singh	1,611	2.62	+1.85
SS	Smt Guddi Devi	930	1.51	+0.32
Independent	Rameshwar Dayal	704	1.14	
NCP	Shimla	370	0.60	
JD(U)	Bhagwan Sahai	182	0.30	
Independent	Inderpal	177	0.29	
ABGMKP	Kishan Pal	87	0.14	
Majority		17,090	27.79	−7.01
Turnout		61,495	52.02	+0.32
INC hold		Swing	-12.77	

=== 1998 ===
1998 Delhi Legislative Assembly election: Seemapuri
Party	Candidate	Votes	%	±%
INC	Veer Singh	30,330	63.26	+29.15
BJP	Chander Pal Singh	13,647	28.46	−10.34
BSP	Brij Pal Singh	1,813	3.78	+1.78
SS	Madan Lal	571	1.19	
IC(S)	K K Ghothwal	430	0.90	
SP	Anoop Sagar	369	0.77	−0.30
Independent	Ravi Verma	269	0.56	
JD	Ch Banwari Lal	193	0.40	−17.53
AGRJP	Raj Kumar	110	0.23	
Independent	Harvir Singh Harnotia	69	0.14	
Independent	Hira Lal Dahara	61	0.13	
Independent	Tuli Ram Sagar	58	0.12	
Independent	Malkhan Singh	28	0.06	
Majority		16,683	34.80	+30.11
Turnout		47,948	51.70	−6.49
INC hold		Swing	+29.15	

=== 1993 ===
1993 Delhi Legislative Assembly election: Seemapuri
Party	Candidate	Votes	%	±%
BJP	Balbir Singh	14,579	38.80	
INC	Giri Lal	12,817	34.11	
JD	Mam Chand Rewaria	6,736	17.93	
Independent	Bhoop Singh	1,266	3.37	
BSP	Shri Nath	752	2.00	
CPI	Ram Prasad Mahaur (Atri)	463	1.23	
SP	Mangal Singh Ujjainwal	401	1.07	
Mukt Bharat	Budhan Singh	398	1.06	
BKD(J)	Chander Pal Singh Rajora	102	0.27	
AIFB	Pramila	36	0.10	
Independent	Kunwar Pal Netaji	21	0.06	
Majority		1,762	4.69	
Turnout		37,571	58.19	
BJP hold		Swing		
