= Rakhi Birla =

Indian politician (born 1987)

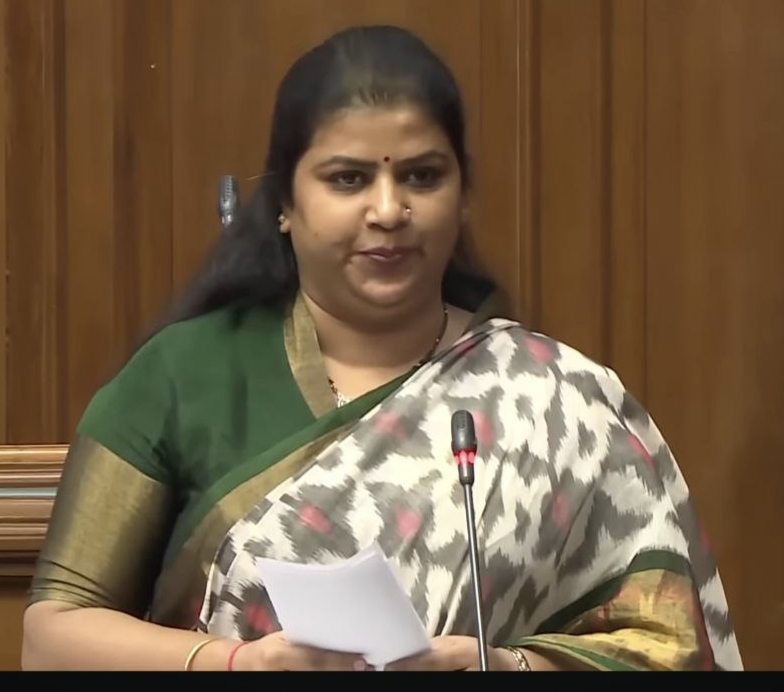
- Birla in 2025

Deputy Speaker of the Delhi Legislative Assembly
- In office 10 June 2016 – 8 February 2025
- Speaker: Ram Niwas Goel
- Preceded by: Bandana Kumari
- Succeeded by: Mohan Singh Bisht

Member of Delhi Legislative Assembly
- In office 2013–2025
- Succeeded by: Raj Kumar Chauhan
- Constituency: Mangol Puri

Cabinet Minister in Delhi
- In office 28 December 2013 – 14 February 2014
- Lieutenant Governor: Najeeb Jung
- Chief Minister: Arvind Kejriwal
- Ministry and Departments: Women & Child; Social Welfare and Languages
- Succeeded by: Rajendra Pal Gautam

Personal details
- Born: Rakhi Bidhlan; 10 June 1987 (age 39) Delhi, India
- Party: Aam Aadmi Party
- Education: Guru Jambheshwar University of Science and Technology (M.A in Mass Communication)
- Occupation: Lawyer; teacher; businessperson; farmer

Rakhi Birla (born 10 June 1987) is an Indian politician. She has served as Cabinet Minister of Women & Child, Social Welfare and Languages and Deputy Speaker in the Government of Delhi.

== Early life and education ==
She was born in Delhi. She adopted Birla as her surname when her school administration mistakenly wrote Birla instead of Bidhlan in her class 10th certificate as she belonged to the Scheduled Caste category. She is the youngest of her parents' four daughters. She did Masters in Mass Communication from NBA School of Mass Communication, New Delhi.

== Career ==
She joined a local television channel, Jain TV, as a trainee reporter after completing her education. In total, she had 7 months' experience in journalism with Jain TV.

=== Political career ===
She came into contact with Arvind Kejriwal during Jan Lokpal Bill movement. She joined Aam Aadmi Party later and contested the 2013 Delhi Legislative Assembly election from Mangolpuri and defeated four-time MLA Raj Kumar Chauhan of Indian National Congress. She was sworn in as a cabinet minister of Women and Child, Social Welfare and Languages in Delhi Government and became the youngest ever Cabinet Minister of Delhi (28 December 2013 to 14 February 2014). She lost to BJP's Udit Raj in the 2014 Lok Sabha election from North West Delhi. She was elected as Deputy Speaker of Delhi Legislative Assembly on 10 June 2016, becoming the youngest ever deputy speaker of the Delhi assembly. She lost to BJP's Kailash Gangwal in the 2025 Delhi Legislative Assembly.

== Positions held ==
- Cabinet Minister, Women and Child, Social Welfare and Languages (28 December 2013 – 14 February 2014)
- Deputy Speaker, Delhi Vidhan Sabha (10 June 2016 – 2024).
- Chairperson, Committee on Women and Child Development, Petition, Question & Reference
- Member, National Executive of Aam Aadmi Party and Ex MLA Mangolpuri

== See also ==
- Delhi Government

== Electoral performance ==
=== 2025 ===
Delhi Assembly elections, 2025: Madipur
Party	Candidate	Votes	%	±%
BJP	Kailash Gangwal	52,019	46.07	
AAP	Rakhi Birla	41,120	36.42	
INC	Jai Prakash Panwar	17,958	15.90	
NOTA	None of the above	778	0.69	
Majority		10,899	9.65	
Turnout		1,12,890		
BJP gain from AAP		Swing		

Delhi Assembly elections, 2020: Mangolpuri
Party	Candidate	Votes	%	±%
AAP	Rakhi Birla	74,154	58.53	+11.59
BJP	Karam Singh Karma	44,038	34.76	+13.13
INC	Rajesh Lilothia	4,073	3.22	−26.12
BSP	Murari Lal	2,491	1.97	+0.68
NOTA	None	657	0.52	+0.11
Majority		30,116	23.77	+6.17
Turnout		1,26,798	66.48	−5.59
AAP hold		Swing	+11.59	

State Legislative Assembly
Preceded by ?	Member of the Delhi Legislative Assembly from Mangol Puri Assembly constituency 2020– 2025	Succeeded by Raj Kumar Chauhan
Aam Aadmi Party political offices
Preceded by -	Member of National Executive Committee; Aam Aadmi Party – present	Incumbent
