= Babarpur =

- Neighborhood of Delhi
- Location in Delhi, India
- Coordinates: 28.68773°N 77.28044°E
- Country: India
- State: Delhi
- District: North East Delhi
- Named for: Emperor Babur

Government
  - Body: Municipal Corporation of Delhi

Languages
  - Official: Hindi, English
- Time zone: UTC+5:30 (IST)
- PIN: 110032
- Telephone code: 011-2282
- Nearest city: Ghaziabad
- Lok Sabha constituency: North East Delhi
- Vidhan Sabha constituency: Babarpur
- Civic agency: Municipal Corporation Of Delhi

Babar pur is the area surrounded by Yamuna Vihar in north, Maujpur in west, Seelampur in south and Chhajjupur in east. It is situated in the region of North Shahdara of Delhi. It is connected to Main 100 feet road to Ashok Nagar. It is located near Ghaziabad-Loni Border.

== Educational institutions ==
- Maladevi School, Babarpur, Shahdara, Delhi - 110032

== Transport ==
There is good connectivity of roads as well as of metro rail. 100 feet road connecting Babarpur to Ghaziabad, while Asha Ram Tyagi Marg/Jafrabad Main Road connects Babarpur to G T Road on the south & to Wazirabad Road on the north. Babarpur has its own bus terminal, known as Babarpur Bus Terminal. There is a quality facility of buses, auto-rickshaws, tempos, electric rickshaws & cycle rickshaws. Now Babarpur has its own metro, Maujpur - Babarpur metro station on the Pink line, situated near Shamshan Ghat. In additionn, Shahdara metro station & Seelampur metro station are also within 1.5 kilometers from Babarpur Bus Terminal.

== Economics ==
Babarpur is famous for naturopathy, Acupressure, Yoga Clinic, and automobile shops which includes Two Wheeler, Battery Fitted Scooter, and mopeds.

- Nearest Malls - Cross River mall, Pacific Mall are nearest located malls to Babarpur.
- Nearest Markets -Teliwara, Chota Bazar, Rohtas Nagar, Maujpur, etc.
