= 2015 Delhi Legislative Assembly election =

2015 state assembly elections in Delhi

- 7 February 2015

All 70 seats in the Legislative Assembly of Delhi 36 seats needed for a majority
- Turnout: 67.47% (▲1.45%)
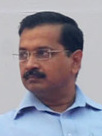

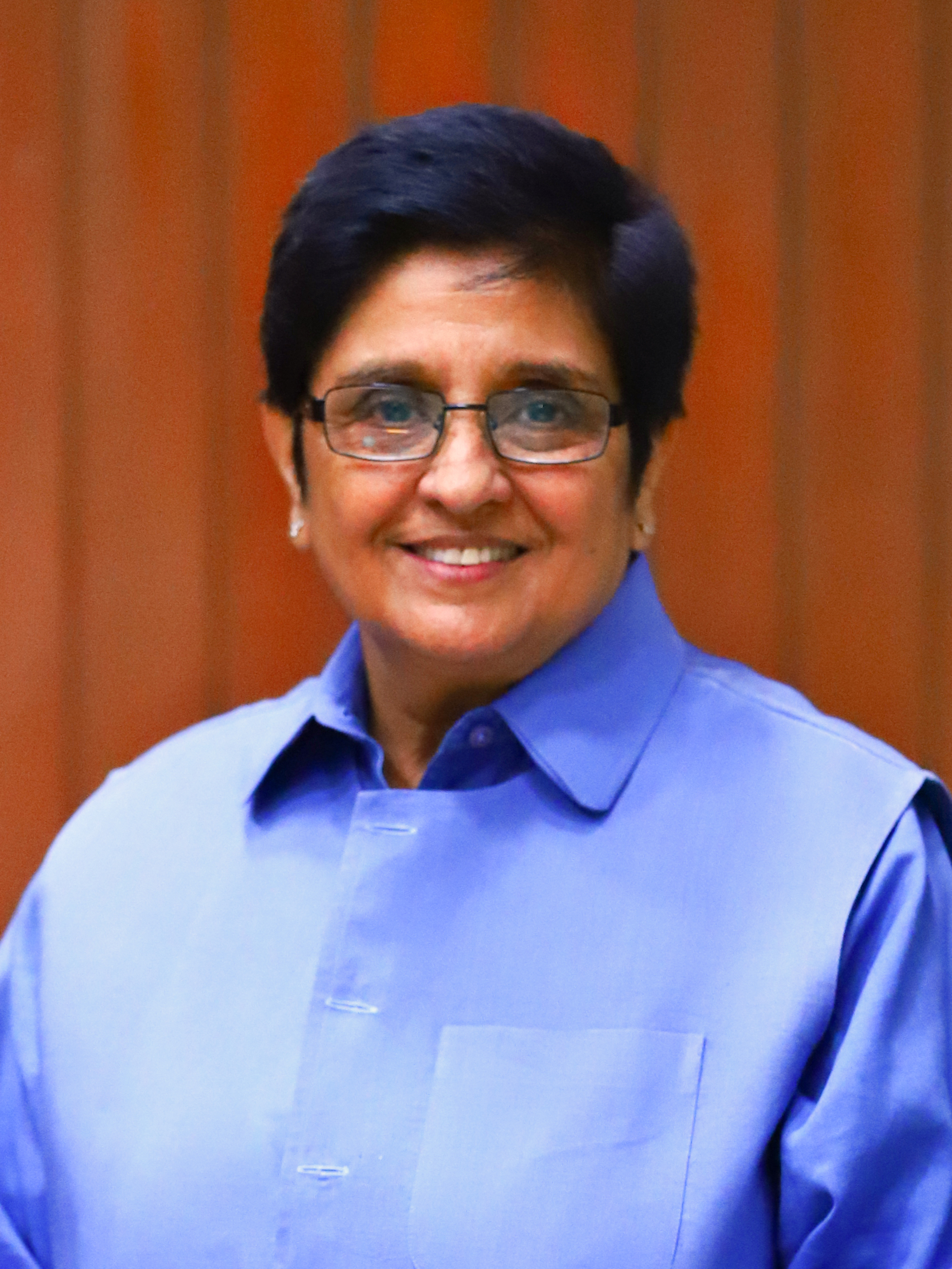
	First party	Second party
Leader	Arvind Kejriwal	Kiran Bedi
Party	AAP	BJP
Alliance		NDA
Leader's seat	New Delhi	Krishna Nagar (lost)
Last election	28	32
Seats won	67	3
Seat change	▲39	▼29
Popular vote	4,879,123	2,975,708
Percentage	54.3%	33.2%
Swing	▲24.8%	▼0.9%

- Structure of the Delhi Legislative Assembly after the election
Chief Minister before election
President's rule
Union of India
Elected Chief Minister
Arvind Kejriwal
AAP

The Delhi Legislative Assembly election was held on 7 February 2015 to elect 70 members of the Sixth Legislative Assembly of Delhi. The results were announced on 10 February 2015. The Aam Aadmi Party secured an absolute majority in the assembly, winning 67 of the 70 seats.

== Background ==
In the 2013 Delhi state elections, the Bharatiya Janata Party (along with its pre-poll ally Shiromani Akali Dal) emerged as the single-largest party, winning 32 out of the 70 seats. However, they fell short of an outright majority and therefore were unable to form the government. This led the then Lieutenant Governor of Delhi Najeeb Jung to invite the Aam Aadmi Party, the second-largest party after the BJP, to form the government. On 28 December 2013, AAP formed the state government after taking outside support from the Indian National Congress. AAP's leader Arvind Kejriwal, who defeated the incumbent chief minister Sheila Dikshit, became the 7th chief minister of Delhi. However, on 14 February 2014 (after 49 days of rule), Arvind Kejriwal resigned from his post citing the reason as his government's inability to table the Jan Lokpal Bill in Delhi Assembly for discussion, due to stiff opposition from other political parties in the house.

Delhi remained thereafter under President's Rule for about a year. On 4 November 2014, the Lieutenant Governor of Delhi Najeeb Jung made a recommendation to the Union Cabinet to dissolve the Delhi Legislative Assembly and conduct fresh elections. On 12 January 2015, the Election Commission of India announced that state assembly elections would be held on 7 February 2015 with results being announced on 10 February 2015.

== Schedule and electorate ==
The election commission announced the schedule for the elections on 12 January 2015. Voter-verified paper audit trail (VVPAT) along with EVMs were used in 2 assembly seats in Delhi elections- New Delhi and Delhi Cantt.

Date of notification	14 January 2015	Wednesday
Last date for nomination	21 January 2015	Wednesday
Date of scrutiny	22 January 2015	Thursday
Last date of withdrawal	24 January 2015	Saturday
Date of poll	7 February 2015	Saturday
Date of counting	10 February 2015	Tuesday
Election Complete	12 February 2015	Thursday

=== Voter statistics ===
Source
Total	13,309,078
Male	7,389,088
Female	5,919,127
Transgender	862
Service	5,110
Non Resident Indians	27

== Parties and Alliances ==
Alliance/Party		Flag	Symbol	Leader	Seats contested	
Aam Aadmi Party				Arvind Kejriwal	70	
NDA	Bharatiya Janata Party			Kiran Bedi	69	70
NDA	Shiromani Akali Dal			Sukhbir Singh Badal	1	70
Indian National Congress				Ajay Maken	70	
Bahujan Samaj Party				Mayawati	70	
Indian National Lok Dal				Om Prakash Chautala	2	
OTHER PARTIES					376	
INDEPENDENTS					222	

== Campaign ==
Safety of women, corruption, water problems and price rises were the main issues in the election.

=== Aam Aadmi Party ===
AAP started campaigning in Delhi in November 2014 and inducted several first-time candidates, with as many as 27 out of 70 MLA candidates. AAP convener Arvind Kejriwal was the chief ministerial candidate and contesting the elections from the New Delhi seat again after successfully managing to defeat incumbent MLA and then CM Sheila Dixit in the 2013 elections. Other known names and prominent faces in their candidate list are Jarnail Singh, Surinder Singh (commando), former Transport Minister for Delhi Saurabh Bhardwaj, former Education Minister Manish Sisodia, and former Law Minister Somnath Bharti.

The rallies and roadshows of Arvind Kejriwal were a great success, drawing large enthusiastic crowds. His nomination rally-cum-roadshow drew massive crowd and included flash mobs, slogans and chant of "5 Saal Kejriwal" song. AAP has consistently targeted the issues of corruption, security, education, environmental pollution, employment opportunities for youth and making Delhi a world class city.

Kejriwal's statement "Paise lekar sting kar lo" created controversies by asking volunteers to take bribes from other parties and do a sting. Kejriwal claimed that BJP had been trying to bribe AAP volunteers. The situation rose The Election Commission of India, which issued notice to Kejriwal to desist from breaking the laws governing the model code of conduct for elections in India. The Delhi court finally allowed Kejriwal to put forth his plea on the matter.

BJP targeted AAP and Kejriwal in a series of controversial negative newspaper ads. AAP claimed that one of these ads made a derogatory reference to Kejriwal's caste, while another one with a garlanded portrait of Anna Hazare signified Hazare's death. AAP threatened to complain about these ads to the Election Commission of India.

Noted music composer and party sympathizer Vishal Dadlani composed a song "Panch Saal Kejriwal" (5 years of Kejriwal Government) in December 2014 to give a boost to AAP's campaign. The song was seen used in flash mobs, roadshows, and rallies and was well received. AAP's campaign included advertisements on bus stops, billboards, and in the Delhi Metro, mostly focusing on Blue and Yellow Lines. To save costs ads were put up only on one side of the Metro.

The last days of the campaign saw TV actors Ayub Khan and Smita Bansal joining AAP. The AAP strategy for campaigning included flash mobs, street plays (nukkad natak), human banners, posters and pamphlets in auto-rickshaws.

Trinamool Congress chief Mamata Banerjee tweeted on 5 February "My request to all of you in Delhi to please vote for AAP. For the greater need of the country and development in Delhi". TMC has stringently criticized BJP's central government in the recent past. Also, CPI(M) general secretary Prakash Karat said in an interview, "15 seats are being contested jointly by Left parties in the Delhi polls. Rest of the 55 seats, our party has decided that it will ask our party members and voters to vote for the AAP. Most of the other left parties are also of the same view".

=== Bharatiya Janata Party ===
On 10 January 2015, Prime Minister Narendra Modi started the BJP's campaign for the Delhi assembly polls by holding an Abhinandan rally at the Ramlila Maidan. With some recent corruption allegations on BJP-Delhi unit head Satish Upadhyay, and speculation of increasing internal fights for CM position between several big leaders liker Jagdeesh Mukhi, Vijay Goel, and Satish Upadhyay, on 15 January 2015, BJP added Kiran Bedi as a prominent face to lead Delhi Campaign. Within 4 days, on 19 January, India's first woman IPS officer, anti-corruption activist and Magsaysay awardee Kiran Bedi was announced by the BJP as their candidate for chief minister in Delhi.

Analysts questioned BJP's decision to project Kiran Bedi as the party's CM candidate when two opinion polls indicated that AAP had gained ground over BJP after the announcement of her candidature. Kiran Bedi was seen leaving news interviews and even questions of her being the first woman IPS and her role in towing Indra Gandhi's convoy car were raised. Her induction led to internal rifts in the party, but the party president Amit Shah defended the decision. On 2 February, Kiran Bedi's manager announced his resignation blaming her "dictatorial attitude", but then withdrew the resignation and apologized on the same day.

Key party strategist Arun Jaitley (now the cabinet minister) was tasked with bringing together the BJP's campaign efforts, with regular meetings at the Delhi BJP office, and Prime Minister Narendra Modi addressing four rallies. Also, 11 central ministers and 17 lawmakers of the party were deployed in the campaign for Delhi. Human Resource Minister Smriti Irani and External Affairs Minister Sushma Swaraj hit the campaign trail addressing several rallies in South and North West Delhi. Haryana Chief Minister Manohar Lal Khattar, held a public meeting in the Bijwasan area of South West Delhi. Madhya Pradesh Chief Minister Shivraj Singh Chouhan is scheduled to campaign for BJP Finance Minister Arun Jaitley, Commerce Minister Nirmala Sitharaman and Chemicals and Fertiliser Minister Ananth Kumar have been making rounds of Delhi BJP office for the last couple of days. As of 29 January, Bharatiya Janata Party (BJP) has brought in 22 of its top ministers at the Centre and 17 MPs to take charge of the campaign. According to another source " around 58 Union ministers and MPs took charge of Delhi constituencies. More than 70 MPs have been assigned to oversee preparations for the Feb. 7 polls to the 70-member Assembly," said a senior BJP leader. Shazia Ilmi a member of AAP who has joined BJP saying BJP stands for good governance and development.

BJP actively used the media for their campaign, and released a series of newspaper advertisements targeting AAP's CM candidate Arvind Kejriwal.

During the last phases of the campaign rallies of Prime Minister Narendra Modi got poor turnouts and the BJP Delhi state unit was seen complaining about appointing Kiran Bedi as the CM candidate.

BJP had prepoll alliance with Shiromani Akali Dal, whose candidates contested four seats: three on BJP's symbol and one on SAD's own symbol.

=== Indian National Congress ===
On 13 January 2015, Ajay Maken was announced as the head of the Congress campaign committee. Maken is also the party's chief minister candidate. On 19 January, Maken released a booklet titled 49 dino ki ultee chaal, Dilli hui behal listing Kejriwal's U-turns and misgovernance during his 49-day government.

=== Other parties ===
Other parties such as Bahujan Samaj Party, Poorvanchal Rashtriya Congress, and Janata Dal are also part of the campaign but none have enough candidates to get a majority vote to form the government on their own.

== Manifestos ==
=== Aam Aadmi Party ===
AAP released its manifesto on 31 January 2015. Highlights of 70-point manifesto

- Resolved to legislate the Delhi Jan Lokpal Bill after coming to power.
- Legislate the Swaraj Act to devolve power directly to the people
- Acting within the constitutional framework will use its moral and political authority to push for full statehood for Delhi
- Will keep its promise of reducing electricity bills by half.
- Conduct a comprehensive performance audit of discoms by the Comptroller and Auditor General of India.
- Put Delhi's own power station at the pithead and comprehensively solve Delhi's electricity problem in long run.
- reiterates the 2013 Delhi manifesto promise of providing consumers the right to choose between electricity providers.
- Facilitate a phased shift to renewable and alternate sources of energy like Solar Energy.
- Provide Water as a Right. It will provide access to clean drinking water to all of Delhi at an affordable price
- Ensure free lifeline water of up to 20 kiloliters (20,000 liters) to every household per month.
- Provide universal access to potable water to all its citizens of Delhi at a sustainable and affordable price.
- Ensure firm implementation of the HC order that entitles Delhi to extra raw water from Haryana in the Munak canal
- Preserve and replenish local and decentralized water resources to augment Delhi's water resources.
- Committed to clamping down on Delhi's powerful water mafia working under the patronage of political leaders.
- Several steps will be taken to revive the Yamuna including sewer treatment and control affluent discharge.
- Formulate a clear policy and standards for the ownership and operation of e-rickshaws,

=== Bharatiya Janata Party ===
On 29 January 2015, the party announced that they would release a vision document before the elections, as full statehood for Delhi was a topic of debate in the party. Although such is the case, beginning 28 January 2015, the BJP's chief ministerial candidate Kiran Bedi has initiated a series of tweets with hashtag #KiransBlueprint detailing her plans for improving Delhi. It has been said that no manifesto by BJP has provided AAP with a "much needed ammunition" in their Election Campaign

On 3 February 2015, the BJP's vision document was released publicly. It included 270 points and 35 areas of focus, which included the following:

- 100% transparency
- Unimpeachable integrity
- Police accountability
- Maximum measurability
- Fiscal prudence
- Zero tolerance to Corruption
- Focus on youth affairs
- Electricity & Water, Cleanliness
- Education & Skill Development
- Environment

=== Indian National Congress ===
Synopsis of Manifesto

- Vows to lower electricity charges in the national capital.
- Rs. 1.5/unit rate for 0–200 unit users.
- 50 percent rebate for above 200 unit users.
- Promises to provide free wi-fi facility across Delhi.
- A uniform pension scheme of Rs. 2000 will be started.
- Assure rate cut in power tariffs
- Waive off old water supply bills.
- Government internet cafes in all assembly seats
- Committed to Yamuna cleaning
- Free sewer connection to the people
- Public transports would also have free wi-fi.
- All hospitals would be equipped with modern diagnosis facilities.
- Service assurance for all government employees. Regularization policies for government teachers and other government servants would follow.
- Metro extension is certainly our commitment
- Salary hike for Anganwadi workers is also on agenda.
- Women's safety is our concern. civil defense and home guard recruitment will be increased
- In addition to this, women's toilets are on our agenda.
- CCTV to be installed in public transport is another focus of the party.

== Contestants ==
=== Nominations ===
The Election Commission canceled the nomination of 230 candidates during the scrutiny of papers and 693 candidates were deemed valid to contest the polls.

=== List of contestants of major parties ===
Constituency							
Constituency		NDA		AAP		UPA	
1	Narela	BJP	Neeldaman Khatri	AAP	Sharad Chauhan	INC	Praveen Kum Bhugra
2	Burari	BJP	Gopal Jha	AAP	Sanjeev Jha	INC	Jile Singh Chauhan
3	Timarpur	BJP	Rajni Abbi	AAP	Pankaj Pushkar	INC	Surender Pal Singh
4	Adarsh Nagar	BJP	Ram Kishan Singhal	AAP	Pawan Kumar Sharma	INC	Mukesh Goel
5	Badli	BJP	Ajesh Yadav	AAP	Ajesh Yadav	INC	Devender Yadav
6	Rithala	BJP	Kulwant Rana	AAP	Mahindra Goel	INC	Jagdish Yadav
7	Bawana	BJP	Ved Parkash	AAP	Ram Chander	INC	Seema Godara
8	Mundka	BJP	Master Azad Singh	AAP	Sukhbir Dalal	INC	Rita Shokeen
9	Kirari	BJP	Anil Jha Vats	AAP	Rituraj Jha	INC	Pratyush Kant
10	Sultan Pur Majra	BJP	Prabhu Dayal Sai	AAP	Sandeep	INC	Jai Kishan
11	Nangloi Jat	BJP	Manoj Shokeen	AAP	Raghuvendra Shaukeen	INC	Bijender Singh
12	Mangol Puri	BJP	Surjeet	AAP	Rakhi Bidlan	INC	Raj Kumar Chauhan
13	Rohini	BJP	Vijendra Gupta	AAP	Charanji Lal Gupta	INC	Sukhbir Sharma
14	Shalimar Bagh	BJP	Rekha Gupta	AAP	Bandana Kumari	INC	Sulekh Agarwal
15	Shakur Basti	BJP	Dr. S. C. Vats	AAP	Satyendra Kumar Jain	INC	Chaman Lal Sharma
16	Tri Nagar	BJP	Nand Kishor Garg	AAP	Jitender Tomar	INC	Anil Bhardwaj
17	Wazirpur	BJP	Mahendra Nagpal	AAP	Rajesh Gupta	INC	Hari Shankar Gupta
18	Model Town	BJP	Vivek Garg	AAP	Akhilesh Pati Tripathi	INC	Kanwar Karan Singh
19	Sadar Bazar	BJP	Praveen Jain	AAP	Som Dutt	INC	Ajay Maken
20	Chandni Chowk	BJP	Suman Kumar Gupta	AAP	Alka Lamba	INC	Prahlad S. Sawhney
21	Matia Mahal	BJP	Anjum Dahalwi	AAP	Asim Ahmed Khan	INC	Shoaib Iqbal
22	Ballimaran	BJP	Shyam Morwal	AAP	Imran Hussain	INC	Haroon Yusuf
23	Karol Bagh	BJP	Yogendra Chandolia	AAP	Vishesh Ravi	INC	Madan Khorwal
24	Patel Nagar	BJP	Krishna Tirath	AAP	Hazari Lal Chauhan	INC	Rajesh Lilothia
25	Moti Nagar	BJP	Subhash Sachdeva	AAP	Shiv Charan Goyal	INC	Raj Kumar Maggo
26	Madipur	BJP	Rajkumar Phulwaria	AAP	Girish Soni	INC	Malaram Gangwal
27	Rajouri Garden	SAD	Manjinder Singh Sirsa	AAP	Jarnail Singh	INC	Dhanvanti Chandela
28	Hari Nagar	SAD	Avtar Singh Hit	AAP	Jagdeep Singh	INC	CP Mittal
29	Tilak Nagar	BJP	Rajeev Babbar	AAP	Jarnail Singh	INC	Dhuli Chand Lohia
30	Janakpuri	BJP	Jagdish Mukhi	AAP	Rajesh Rishi	INC	Suresh Kumar
31	Vikaspuri	BJP	Sanjay Singh	AAP	Mahendra Yadav	INC	Nand Kishore Sehrawat
32	Uttam Nagar	BJP	Pawan Sharma	AAP	Naresh Balyan	INC	Mukesh Sharma
33	Dwarka	BJP	Pradyuman Rajput	AAP	Adarsh Shastri	INC	Mahabal Mishra
34	Matiala	BJP	Rajesh Gehlot	AAP	Gulab Singh Yadav	INC	Sumesh Shokeen
35	Najafgarh	BJP	Ajeet Kharkhari	AAP	Kailash Gehlot	INC	Jai Kishan Sharma
36	Bijwasan	BJP	Sat Prakash Rana	AAP	Devinder Kumar Sehrawat	INC	Vijay Singh Lochav
37	Palam	BJP	Dharamdev Solanki	AAP	Bhavna Gaur	INC	Madan Mohan
38	Delhi Cantonment	BJP	Karan Singh Tanwar	AAP	Surinder Singh	INC	Sandeep Tanwar
39	Rajinder Nagar	BJP	Sardar R. P. Singh	AAP	Vijender Garg	INC	Brahm Yadav
40	New Delhi	BJP	Nupur Sharma	AAP	Arvind Kejriwal	INC	Kiran Walia
41	Jangpura	BJP	Maninder Singh Dhir	AAP	Praveen Kumar	INC	Tarwinder S. Marwah
42	Kasturba Nagar	BJP	Ravindra Choudhary	AAP	Madan Lal	INC	Neeraj Basoya
43	Malviya Nagar	BJP	Nandini Sharma	AAP	Somnath Bharti	INC	Dr. Yoganand Shastri
44	R K Puram	BJP	Anil Sharma	AAP	Pramila Tokas	INC	Leeladhar Bhatt
45	Mehrauli	BJP	Sarita Chaudhary	AAP	Naresh Yadav	INC	Satbir Singh
46	Chhatarpur	BJP	Brahm Singh Tanwar	AAP	Kartar Singh Tanwar	INC	Balram Tanwar
47	Deoli	BJP	Arvind Kumar	AAP	Prakash Jarwal	INC	Rajesh Chauhan
48	Ambedkar Nagar	BJP	Ashok Chauhan	AAP	Ajay Dutt	INC	Ch. Prem Singh
49	Sangam Vihar	BJP	H. C. L. Gupta	AAP	Dinesh Mohania	INC	Vishan Swaroop Agarwal
50	Greater Kailash	BJP	Rakesh Gulia	AAP	Saurabh Bhardwaj	INC	Sharmistha Mukherjee
51	Kalkaji	BJP	Harmeet Singh Kalka	AAP	Avtar Singh	INC	Subhash Chopra
52	Tughlakabad	BJP	Vikram Vidhuri	AAP	Sahi Ram	INC	Sachin Bidhuri
53	Badarpur	BJP	Rambir Vidhuri	AAP	ND Sharma	INC	Ram Singh Netaji
54	Okhla	BJP	Brahm Singh Vidhuri	AAP	Amanatullah Khan	INC	Asif Muhammad Khan
55	Trilokpuri	BJP	Kiran Vaidhya	AAP	Raju Dhingan	INC	Brahm Pal
56	Kondli	BJP	Hukum Singh	AAP	Manoj Kumar	INC	Amrish Singh Gautam
57	Patparganj	BJP	Vinod Kumar Binny	AAP	Manish Sisodia	INC	Anil Kumar
58	Laxmi Nagar	BJP	B. B. Tyagi	AAP	Nitin Tyagi	INC	A. K. Walia
59	Vishwas Nagar	BJP	Om Prakash Sharma	AAP	Atul Gupta	INC	Naseeb Singh
60	Krishna Nagar	BJP	Kiran Bedi	AAP	S. K. Bagga	INC	Bansi Lal
61	Gandhi Nagar	BJP	Jitendra Choudhary	AAP	Anil Kumar Bajpai	INC	Surendra Kumar
62	Shahdara	BJP	Jitender Singh Shunty	AAP	Ram Niwas Goel	INC	Narender Nath
63	Seemapuri	BJP	Karam Vir Chandel	AAP	Rajendra Pal Gautam	INC	Veer Singh Dhingan
64	Rohtas Nagar	BJP	Jitendra Mahajan	AAP	Sarita Singh	INC	Vipin Sharma
65	Seelampur	BJP	Sanjay Jain	AAP	Mohammad Ishraque	INC	Ch. Mateen Ahmed
66	Ghonda	BJP	Sahib Singh Chouhan	AAP	SD Sharma	INC	Bheesham Sharma
67	Babarpur	BJP	Naresh Gaur	AAP	Gopal Rai	INC	Zakir Khan
68	Gokalpur	BJP	Ranjeet Kashyap	AAP	Fateh Singh	INC	Rinku
69	Mustafabad	BJP	Jagdish Pradhan	AAP	Haji Yunus	INC	Hasan Ahmed
70	Karawal Nagar	BJP	Mohan Singh Bisht	AAP	Kapil Mishra	INC	Satanpal

=== Analysis of Affidavits ===
Delhi Election Watch and Association for Democratic Reforms (ADR) have analyzed the self-sworn affidavits of all 673 candidates who are contesting in the 2015 Delhi Assembly Elections. There are 70 political parties fielding candidates in these elections. In the previous elections in 2013 77 political parties were contested and in 2008 there were 68 political parties that were in the fray. There are 66 (10%), female candidates, out of 673 candidates contesting this year. In 2013 there were 71(9%), female candidates, out of 810 candidates in the fray, and in 2008 there were 81 (9%) female candidates out of 875 candidates contesting the elections.

- 114 (17%) Candidates with Criminal Cases
- 230 (34%) Crorepati Candidates
- 74 (11%) Candidates with Serious Criminal Cases
- Rs. 33.2 million Average Assets of Candidates.

== Opinion polls ==
=== Number of seats (70) ===
Survey	Date	Sample size	Constituencies covered	AAP	BJP	INC	Others	Ref(s)
ABP News-Nielsen	5–7 November 2014	6528	35	28	36	5	1	
NewsX–CVoter	12 November 2014	2447	?	26	37	6	2	
Economic Times–TNS	21 Nov-5 Dec 2014	7113	35	22–25	43–47	0–3	0	
ABP News–Nielsen	4–8 December 2014	6409	35	17	45	7	1	
India Today–CICERO Wave 1	18 December 2014	4273	70	28±3	37±3	4±1	1±1	
TV24 News India	25 December 2014	8200	70	39	23	5	3	
India Today–CICERO Wave 2	12 January 2015	4459	70	25–30	34–40	3–5	0–2	
India TV-CVoter	12 January 2015	4238	?	29	35	5	1	
ABP News–Nielsen	15 January 2015	6414	70	28	34	8	0	
News Nation	11–15 January 2015	3195	?	33±2	31±2	5±1	1±1	
Zee News-Taleem	10–16 January 2015	4200	35	29	37	4	0	
India TV-CVoter	18–24 January	1306	?	28	37	5	0	
The Week-IMRB	22–24 January 2015	4055	70	29±2	36±2	4±1	1±1	
ABP News–Nielsen	24–25 January 2015	6396	35	35	29	6	0	
Hindustan Times-C fore	10–19 and 24–27 January 2015	7147	?	31–36	31–36	2–7	0	
India TV-CVoter	25–31 January	10862	?	31	36	2	1	
Economic Times-TNS	25–31 January 2015	3260	16	38±2	30±2	2±1	0	
Hindustan Times-C fore	27 January – 1 February 2015	3578	?	36–41	27–32	2–7	0–5	
AAP (internal)	31 January – 1 February 2015	3188	35	51±6	15±5	4±2	–	
NDTV Poll of Opinion Polls (based on C fore, TNS and Nielsen)	3 February 2015	–	–	37	29	4	0	
India Today Group-Cicero	3 February 2015	3972	?	42±4	22±3	5±2	1±1	
Times Now Poll of Polls (based on C fore, TNS, Nielsen, CVoter and IMRB)	3 February 2015	–	–	34	32	2	4	
Data Mineria	4 February 2015	?	?	27	36	7	0	
News Nation	31 January – 4 February 2015	3000	?	32±2	33±2	4±1	0–1	
Zee News-Taleem	4 February 2015	?	?	32±2	34±2	4±1	0	
Total TV news	4 February 2015	36539	70	49±4	21±4	2	0	
Research and Development Initiative	5 February 2015	21000	70	23±2	43±2	2±2	0	
Actual Results	10 February 2015		70	67	3	0	0	

=== Vote share ===
Survey	Date	AAP	BJP	INC	Others	Ref(s)
TV24 news Chandigarh	28 December 2014	53%	32%	9%	6%	
ABP News–Nielsen	10 November 2014	38%	38%	22%	14%	
NewsX–CVoter	12 November 2014	39%	44%	11%	6%	
ABP News–Nielsen	12 December 2014	27%	38%	24%	11%	
India Today–CICERO Wave 1	18 December 2014	36%	39%	16%	9%	
The Economic Times–TNS	21 Nov-5 Dec 2014	40%	46%	N/A	N/A	
TotalTV News	23 December 2014	48%	40%	8%	4%	
India Today–CICERO Wave 2	12 January 2015	36%	40%	16%	8%	
India TV-CVoter	12 January 2015	40%	42%	11%	7%	
ABP News–Nielsen	15 January 2015	31%	35%	24%	10%	
News Nation	11–15 January 2015	39%	35%	15%	5%	
ABP News–Nielsen	19 January 2015	46%	45%	8%	1%	
Zee News-Taleem	10–16 January 2015	35%	44%	14%	7%	
India TV news- C Voter	18–24 January	40%	45%	10%	5%	
ABP News–Nielsen snap poll	24–25 January 2015	50%	41%	9%	0%	
Hindustan Times-C fore	10–19 and 24–27 January 2015	38.4%	38%	14.5%	9.1%	
Hindustan Times-C fore	27 January – 1 February 2015	40%	37%	15%	8%	
Total TV news	20 January – 3 February 2015	47.63%	35.57%	13.68%	3.12%	

View source data.

== Voting ==
Polling took place at 12,177 polling stations. As many as 95,000 government officials were deployed for election duty. 16,000 control units 20,000 ballot units were to be used for polling. As for security inside polling booths, 1,200 micro observers oversaw the entire procedure and also reported technical problems in EVM operations. According to the Delhi CEO, a total of 43,235 postal ballots were received in comparison to 41,095 during the Assembly Elections 2013.

A record 67.47% turnout was registered on the election day. The voter turnout was 1.61% higher than 65.86% polling in the 2013 Assembly polls. The polling percentage was 65.07% in the Lok Sabha polls in April 2014.

Constituency No.	Constituency Name	Poll percent
1	Narela	
2	Burari	
3	Timarpur	
4	Adarsh Nagar	
5	Badli	
6	Rithala	
7	Bawana	
8	Mundka	
9	Kirari	
10	Sultan Pur Majra	
11	Nangloi Jat	
12	Mangol Puri	
13	Rohini	
14	Shalimar Bagh	
15	Shakur Basti	
16	Tri Nagar	
17	Wazirpur	
18	Model Town	
19	Sadar Bazar	
20	Chandni Chowk	
21	Matia Mahal	
22	Ballimaran	
23	Karol Bagh	
24	Patel Nagar	
25	Moti Nagar	
26	Madipur	
27	Rajouri Garden	
28	Hari Nagar	
29	Tilak Nagar	
30	Janakpuri	
31	Vikaspuri	
32	Uttam Nagar	
33	Dwarka	
34	Matiala	
35	Najafgarh	
36	Bijwasan	
37	Palam	
38	Delhi Cantonment	58.47
39	Rajinder Nagar	
40	New Delhi	64.16
41	Jangpura	
42	Kasturba Nagar	
43	Malviya Nagar	
44	R K Puram	
45	Mehrauli	
46	Chhatarpur	
47	Deoli	
48	Ambedkar Nagar	
49	Sangam Vihar	
50	Greater Kailash	
51	Kalkaji	
52	Tughlakabad	
53	Badarpur	
54	Okhla	
55	Trilokpuri	
56	Kondli	
57	Patparganj	
58	Laxmi Nagar	
59	Vishwas Nagar	
60	Krishna Nagar	
61	Gandhi Nagar	
62	Shahdara	
63	Seemapuri	
64	Rohtas Nagar	
65	Seelampur	
66	Ghonda	
67	Babarpur	
68	Gokalpur	73.46
69	Mustafabad	
70	Karawal Nagar	

=== Allegations on Breaking Code of Conduct ===
BJP's candidate Surjeet Kumar from Mangolpuri was detained on the night before the Election following allegations of liquor distribution. As per the reports, he was caught distributing liquor to people around 3.30 am. Liquor bottles recovered from a car purportedly owned by him.

AAP complained to Election Commission against Kiran Bedi for violating model code of conduct in Krishna Nagar Constituency by holding pad-yatra and asking for votes on the day of Election.

== Exit polls ==
Survey	Date					Ref(s)
Survey	Date	AAP	BJP	INC	Others	Ref(s)
India TV-C Voter	7 February 2015	35–43	25–33	0–2	0	
India Today-Cicero	7 February 2015	38–46	19–27	3–5	0–2	
ABP-Nielsen	7 February 2015	43	26	1	0	
Today's Chanakya	7 February 2015	48	22	0	0	
Axis	7 February 2015	53	17	0	0	
News Nation	7 February 2015	41–45	23–27	1–3	0–1	
Data Mineria	7 February 2015	31	35	4	0	
Actual Results		67	3	0	0	

== Result ==
On 10 February 2015, counting was held. AAP won 67 seats and BJP just 3. Bharatiya Janata Party's chief ministerial candidate Kiran Bedi lost to Aam Aadmi Party candidate SK Bagga in the Krishna Nagar constituency by 2277 votes. Congress party candidates lost deposits in 63 of the 70 seats, including senior leaders Ajay Maken, Yoganand Shastri, Kiran Walia and Sharmistha Mukherjee. Arvind Kejriwal took oath as the CM of Delhi on 14 February 2015.

=== By party ===
Summary of the 7 February 2015 Delhi Legislative Assembly election results
Parties and coalitions	Popular vote			Seats			
Parties and coalitions	Votes	%	±pp	Contested	Won	+/−	%
Aam Aadmi Party (AAP)	48,78,397	54.3	▲24.8	70	67	▲39	95.7
Bharatiya Janata Party (BJP)	28,90,485	32.2	▼0.8	69	3	▼28	4.2
Indian National Congress (INC)	8,66,814	9.7	▼14.9	70	0	▼8	0.0
Bahujan Samaj Party (BSP)	117,093	1.3	▼4.1	70	0	Steady	0.0
Indian National Lok Dal (INLD)	54,464	0.6	Steady	2	0	Steady	0.0
Independents (IND)	47,623	0.5	▼2.4	222	0	▼1	0.0
Shiromani Akali Dal (SAD)	44,880	0.5	▼0.5	1	0	▼1	0.0
Other parties and candidates	42,589	0.5	▼2.1	376	0	Steady	0.0
None of the Above (NOTA)	35,924	0.4	Steady				
Total	89,78,269	100.00		880	70	±0	100.0
Valid votes	89,42,372	99.56					
Invalid votes	39,856	0.44					
Votes cast / turnout	89,82,228	67.47					
Abstentions	43,31,067	32.53					
Registered voters	1,33,13,295						
Source: Election Commission of India

Vote Share of different parties in the election.
1. AAP (54.3%)
2. BJP (32.2%)
3. INC (9.65%)
4. Others (3.82%)

=== Results by districts ===
District	Seats		
District	Seats	AAP	BJP
North Delhi	8	7	1
Central Delhi	7	7	0
North West Delhi	7	7	0
West Delhi	7	7	0
New Delhi	6	6	0
South West Delhi	7	7	0
South East Delhi	7	7	0
South Delhi	5	5	0
East Delhi	6	6	0
Shahdara	5	4	1
North East Delhi	5	4	1
Total	70	67	3

=== Results by constituency ===
Constituency		Winner				Runner Up				Margin	%
#	Name	Candidate	Party	Votes	%	Candidate	Party	Votes	%	Margin	%
1	Narela	Sharad Chauhan	AAP	96,143	59.97	Neeldaman Khatri	BJP	55,851	34.84	40,292	25.13
2	Burari	Sanjeev Jha	AAP	1,24,724	63.82	Gopal Jha	BJP	56,774	29.05	67,950	34.77
3	Timarpur	Pankaj Pushkar	AAP	64,477	51.05	Rajni Abbi	BJP	43,830	34.70	20,647	16.35
4	Adarsh Nagar	Pawan Kumar	AAP	54,026	51.36	Ram Kishan Singhal	BJP	33,285	31.64	20,741	19.72
5	Badli	Ajesh Yadav	AAP	72,795	51.14	Devender Yadav	INC	37,419	26.29	35,376	24.85
6	Rithala	Mohinder Goyal	AAP	93,470	56.63	Kulwant Rana	BJP	64,219	38.91	29,251	17.72
7	Bawana (SC)	Ved Parkash	AAP	1,08,928	58.14	Gugan Singh	BJP	58,371	31.16	50,557	26.98
8	Mundka	Sukhvir Singh	AAP	94,206	57.22	Azad Singh	BJP	53,380	32.42	40,826	24.80
9	Kirari	Rituraj Govind	AAP	97,727	61.66	Anil Jha	BJP	52,555	33.16	45,172	28.50
10	S. Majra (SC)	Sandeep Kumar	AAP	80,269	69.50	Parbhu Dayal	BJP	15,830	13.71	64,439	55.79
11	Nangloi Jat	Raghuvinder Shokeen	AAP	83,259	54.64	Manoj Kumar Shokeen	BJP	46,235	30.34	37,024	24.30
12	Mangol Puri (SC)	Rakhi Birla	AAP	60,534	46.94	Raj Kumar Chauhan	INC	37,835	29.34	22,699	17.60
13	Rohini	Vijender Gupta	BJP	59,866	49.83	C. L. Gupta Advocate	AAP	54,499	45.36	5,367	4.47
14	Shalimar Bagh	Bandana Kumari	AAP	62,656	52.14	Rekha Gupta	BJP	51,678	43.01	10,978	9.13
15	Shakur Basti	Satyendar Jain	AAP	51,530	48.67	S C Vats	BJP	48,397	45.71	3,133	2.96
16	Tri Nagar	Jitender Singh Tomar	AAP	63,012	55.70	Nand Kishore Garg	BJP	40,701	35.98	22,311	19.72
17	Wazirpur	Rajesh Gupta	AAP	61,208	54.85	Dr. Mahander Nagpal	BJP	39,164	35.10	22,044	19.75
18	Model Town	Akhilesh Pati Tripathi	AAP	54,628	52.38	Vivek Garg	BJP	37,922	36.36	16,706	16.02
19	Sadar Bazar	Som Dutt	AAP	67,507	56.60	Parveen Kumar Jain	BJP	33,192	27.83	34,315	28.77
20	Chandni Chowk	Alka Lamba	AAP	36,756	49.35	Suman Kumar Gupta	BJP	18,469	24.80	18,287	24.55
21	Matia Mahal	Asim Ahmed Khan	AAP	47,584	59.23	Shoaib Iqbal	INC	21,488	26.75	26,096	32.48
22	Ballimaran	Imran Hussain	AAP	57,118	59.71	Shayam Lal Morwal	BJP	23,241	24.30	33,877	35.41
23	Karol Bagh (SC)	Vishesh Ravi	AAP	67,429	59.80	Yogender Chandoliya	BJP	34,549	30.64	32,880	29.16
24	Patel Nagar (SC)	Hazari Lal Chauhan	AAP	68,868	59.05	Krishna Tirath	BJP	34,230	29.35	34,638	29.70
25	Moti Nagar	Shiv Charan Goel	AAP	60,223	53.13	Subhash Sachdeva	BJP	45,002	39.70	15,221	13.43
26	Madipur (SC)	Girish Soni	AAP	66,571	57.24	Raj Kumar	BJP	37,184	31.97	29,387	25.27
27	Rajouri Garden	Jarnail Singh	AAP	54,916	46.55	Manjinder Singh Sirsa	SAD	44,880	38.04	10,036	8.51
28	Hari Nagar	Jagdeep Singh	AAP	65,398	58.51	Avtar Singh Hit	BJP	38,954	34.85	26,444	23.66
29	Tilak Nagar	Jarnail Singh	AAP	57,180	55.10	Rajiv Babbar	BJP	37,290	35.93	19,890	19.17
30	Janakpuri	Rajesh Rishi	AAP	71,802	57.72	Prof. Jagdish Mukhi	BJP	46,222	37.16	25,580	20.56
31	Vikaspuri	Mahinder Yadav	AAP	1,32,437	62.53	Sanjay Singh	BJP	54,772	25.86	77,665	36.67
32	Uttam Nagar	Naresh Balyan	AAP	85,881	51.99	Pawan Sharma	BJP	55,462	33.58	30,419	18.41
33	Dwarka	Adarsh Shastri	AAP	79,729	59.08	Parduymn Rajput	BJP	40,363	29.91	39,366	29.17
34	Matiala	Gulab Singh	AAP	1,27,665	54.91	Rajesh Gahlot	BJP	80,661	34.70	47,004	20.21
35	Najafgarh	Kailash Gahlot	AAP	55,598	34.62	Bharat Singh	INLD	54,043	33.65	1,555	0.97
36	Bijwasan	Col Devinder Sehrawat	AAP	65,006	54.99	Sat Prakash Rana	BJP	45,470	38.46	19,536	16.53
37	Palam	Bhavna Gaur	AAP	82,637	55.96	Dharm Dev Solanki	BJP	51,788	35.07	30,849	20.89
38	Delhi Cantt	Surender Singh	AAP	40,133	51.82	Karan Singh Tanwar	BJP	28,935	37.36	11,198	14.46
39	Rajinder Nagar	Vijender Garg Vijay	AAP	61,354	53.39	R. P. Singh	BJP	41,303	35.94	20,051	17.45
40	New Delhi	Arvind Kejriwal	AAP	57,213	64.14	Nupur Sharma	BJP	25,630	28.73	31,583	35.41
41	Jangpura	Praveen Kumar	AAP	43,927	48.11	Maninder Singh Dhir	BJP	23,477	25.71	20,450	22.40
42	Kasturba Nagar	Madan Lal	AAP	50,766	51.55	Ravinder Choudhry	BJP	34,870	35.41	15,896	16.14
43	Malviya Nagar	Somnath Bharti	AAP	51,196	54.99	Dr. Nandani Sharma	BJP	35,299	37.91	15,897	17.08
44	R K Puram	Parmila Tokas	AAP	54,645	56.77	Anil Kumar Sharma	BJP	35,577	36.96	19,068	19.81
45	Mehrauli	Naresh Yadav	AAP	58,125	51.06	Sarita Chaudhary	BJP	41,174	36.17	16,951	14.89
46	Chhatarpur	Kartar Singh Tanwar	AAP	67,645	54.29	Brahm Singh Tanwar	BJP	45,405	36.44	22,240	17.85
47	Deoli	Prakash	AAP	96,530	70.61	Arvind Kumar	BJP	32,593	23.84	63,937	46.77
48	A. B. Nagar (SC)	Ajay Dutt	AAP	66,632	68.39	Ashok Kumar	BJP	24,172	24.81	42,460	43.58
49	Sangam Vihar	Dinesh Mohaniya	AAP	72,131	65.96	Shiv Charan Lal Gupta	BJP	28,143	25.73	43,988	40.23
50	Greater Kailash	Saurabh Bharadwaj	AAP	57,589	53.30	Rakesh Kumar Gullaiya	BJP	43,006	39.81	14,583	13.49
51	Kalkaji	Avtar Singh Kalkaji	AAP	55,104	51.72	Harmeet Singh Kalka	BJP	35,335	33.16	19,769	18.56
52	Tughlakabad	Sahi Ram	AAP	64,311	62.40	Vikram Bidhuri	BJP	30,610	29.70	33,701	32.70
53	Badarpur	Narayan Dutt Sharma	AAP	94,242	55.31	Ramvir Singh Bidhuri	BJP	46,659	27.38	47,583	27.93
54	Okhla	Amanatullah Khan	AAP	1,04,271	62.57	Braham Singh	BJP	39,739	23.84	64,532	38.73
55	Trilokpuri (SC)	Raju Dhingan	AAP	74,907	58.62	Kiran Vaidya	BJP	45,153	35.34	29,754	23.28
56	Kondli (SC)	Manoj Kumar	AAP	63,185	50.66	Hukam Singh	BJP	38,426	30.81	24,759	19.85
57	Patparganj	Manish Sisodia	AAP	75,243	53.64	Vinod Kumar Binny	BJP	46,452	33.12	28,791	20.52
58	Laxmi Nagar	Nitin Tyagi	AAP	58,229	42.55	B. B. Tyagi	BJP	53,383	39.01	4,846	3.54
59	Vishwas Nagar	Om Prakash Sharma	BJP	58,124	45.16	Dr. Atul Gupta	AAP	47,966	37.26	10,158	7.90
60	Krishna Nagar	S K Bagga, Advocate	AAP	65,919	47.99	Kiran Bedi	BJP	63,642	46.33	2,277	1.66
61	Gandhi Nagar	Anil Kumar Bajpai	AAP	50,946	45.24	Jitender	BJP	43,464	38.60	7,482	6.64
62	Shahdara	Ram Niwas Goel	AAP	58,523	49.49	Jitender Singh Shunty	BJP	46,792	39.57	11,731	9.92
63	Seema Puri (SC)	Rajendra Pal Gautam	AAP	79,777	63.04	Karamvir	BJP	30,956	24.46	48,821	38.58
64	Rohtas Nagar	Sarita Singh	AAP	62,209	45.96	Jitender Mahajan	BJP	54,335	40.14	7,874	5.82
65	Seelampur	Mohd. Ishraque	AAP	57,302	51.26	Sanjay Jain	BJP	29,415	26.31	27,887	24.95
66	Ghonda	Shri Dutt Sharma	AAP	60,906	44.96	Sahab Singh Chauhan	BJP	52,813	38.98	8,093	5.98
67	Babarpur	Gopal Rai	AAP	76,179	59.14	Naresh Gaur	BJP	40,908	31.76	35,271	27.38
68	Gokalpur (SC)	Fateh Singh	AAP	71,240	48.71	Ranjeet Singh	BJP	39,272	26.85	31,968	21.86
69	Mustafabad	Jagdish Pradhan	BJP	58,388	35.33	Hasan Ahmed	INC	52,357	31.68	6,031	3.65
70	Karawal Nagar	Kapil Mishra	AAP	1,01,865	59.85	Mohan Singh Bisht	BJP	57,434	33.74	44,431	26.11

== Reactions ==
- Prime Minister of India Narendra Modi called up Arvind Kejriwal and congratulated him on his thumping victory in Delhi and assured him of all support from the Centre for development of the national capital.
- West Bengal's Chief Minister Mamata Banerjee expressed her "heartiest congratulations" to the party. She also said, "This is a victory for the people and a big defeat for the arrogant and those who are doing political vendetta & spreading hate among people."
- CPI(M) General Secretary Prakash Karat said "The stupendous victory of AAP in the Delhi election is a total rejection of BJP and the leadership of Narendra Modi”.
- Andhra Pradesh Chief Minister Nara Chandrababu Naidu said in a statement that "The victory of AAP reflects the greatness of democracy in India".
- Telangana Chief Minister K Chandrasekhar Rao said "The Delhi (Assembly election) results are an example to show that the people are thinking differently from traditional politics".
- Janata Dal (United) leader Nitish Kumar told the media "People want development with justice. They never accept arrogance. This is reflected in AAP's victory in Delhi".
- Singer Vishal Dadlani tweeted that he was "Wavin' the Jhaadu!".
- BJP's Chief Ministerial candidate Kiran Bedi congratulated Kejriwal and also asked him "make it a world class city".
- Gul Panag, actor-turned-politician and a candidate for General elections 2014 from Chandigarh from Aam Aadmi Party, said that the citizens of Delhi are creditable for the win and exclaimed that she wants to expand the party in Chandigarh. She also turned out for campaigning for Aam Aadmi Party for the elections.
- Shiv Sena President Uddhav Thackeray mocked BJP by stating "Voters in Delhi have shown that a tsunami is bigger than any wave ."
- Rajdeep Sardesai A famous Indian Journalist referring to AAP's use of Social Media and indifference of mainstream media to AAP before the election said "In the 2015 Delhi elections, Arvind Kejriwal didn't just demolish his opposition; he also defeated the media. The AAP leader had gone over our heads, effectively used social media, but most importantly, go directly to those who really mattered: the voter! Pompous editors, noisy anchors, and a corporatized media ownership had all been defeated."

== Aftermath ==
Second Kejriwal ministry of the Delhi government was formed on 14 February 2015, led by Kejriwal as Delhi's chief minister for a second time at Ramlila Maidan.

== Bypolls (2015–2020) ==
S.No	Date	Constituency	MLA before election	Party before election	Elected MLA	Party after election
27	9 April 2017	Rajouri Garden	Jarnail Singh	Aam Aadmi Party	Manjinder Singh Sirsa	Bharatiya Janata Party
7	23 August 2017	Bawana	Ved Parkash	Aam Aadmi Party	Ram Chander	Aam Aadmi Party

== See also ==
- First Legislative Assembly of Delhi
- Second Legislative Assembly of Delhi
- Third Legislative Assembly of Delhi
- Fourth Legislative Assembly of Delhi
- Fifth Legislative Assembly of Delhi
- Sixth Legislative Assembly of Delhi
