= 1952 Delhi Legislative Assembly election =

1952 state assembly election in Delhi

- 27 March 1952

All 48 seats to the Delhi Legislative Assembly 25 seats needed for a majority
- Turnout: 58.52%
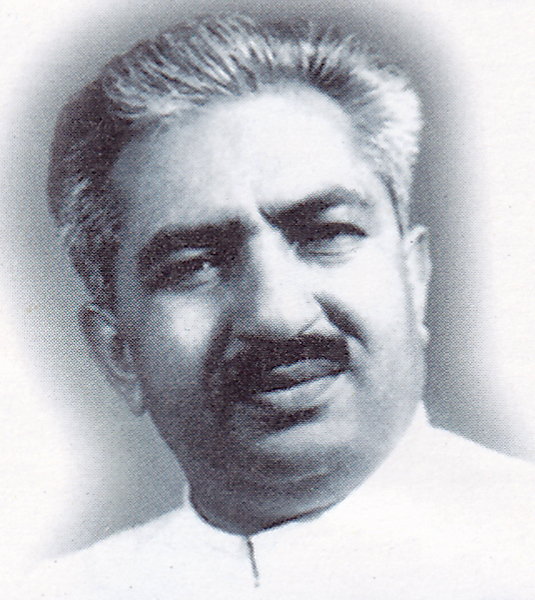

	First party	Second party
Leader	Brahm Prakash
Party	INC	ABJS
Leader's seat	Nangloi Jat	-
Seats before	N/A	N/A
Seats won	39	5
Seat change	N/A	N/A
Popular vote	2,71,812	1,14,207
Percentage	52.09%	21.89%
Chief Minister before election
Office established
Chief Minister
Brahm Prakash
INC

Indian administrative divisions, as of 1951

The first Delhi Legislative Assembly election to the Delhi Legislative Assembly was held on 27 March 1952. Forty-eight seats were up for election. Six of the constituencies elected two assembly members, the remaining 36 constituencies elected a single member.

== Results ==
Congress emerged as the single largest party in the first legislative elections held in Delhi. Chaudhary Brahm Prakash of Indian National Congress was elected Chief Minister.

Summary of results of the 1952 Delhi Legislative Assembly election
Party	Seats Contested	Won	% of Seats	Votes	Vote %
Indian National Congress	47	39	81.25	271,812	52.09
Bharatiya Jana Sangh	31	5	10.42	114,207	21.89
Scheduled Castes Federation	5	0	0	15,592	2.99
Kisan Mazdoor Praja Party	7	0	0	13,646	2.62
Socialist Party	6	2	4.17	12,396	2.38
Akhil Bharatiya Hindu Mahasabha	5	1	2.08	6,891	1.32
Communist Party of India	1	0	0	2,591	0.50
Akhil Bharatiya Ram Rajya Parishad	4	0	0	849	0.16
Forward Bloc (Marxist Group)	1	0	0	503	0.10
Revolutionary Socialist Party	1	0	0	307	0.06
Independent	78	1	2.08	82,972	15.90
Total Seats	48	Voters	744,668	Turnout	521,766 (58.52%)

== Elected members ==
S.No.	Constituency	Member	Party
1	Kotla Feroze Shah	Shanta Vasisht	Indian National Congress
2	Parliament Street	Kaushaleshwar Prasad Shankara	Indian National Congress
3	Safdar Jang	Daljit Singh	Indian National Congress
4	Lodhi Road	Shiva Nandan Rishi	Indian National Congress
5	Puran Qilla Viney Nagar	Pushpa Devi	Indian National Congress
6	Delhi Cantt	Raghvendra Singh	Indian National Congress
7	Reading Road	Amin Chand	Bharatiya Jana Sangh
8	Reading Road	Prafulla Ranjan Chakravarty	Indian National Congress
9	Chittar Gupta	Kartar Singh	Indian National Congress
10	Mantola	Mushtaq Rai	Indian National Congress
11	Ram Nagar	Shankar Lal	Indian National Congress
12	Jhanday Walan	Ghardhari Lal Salwan	Bharatiya Jana Sangh
13	Kashmere Gate	Bhagwan Dass	Indian National Congress
14	Chandni Chowk	Yudhvir Singh	Indian National Congress
15	Phatak Habash Khan	Harkishan Lal	Indian National Congress
16	Maliwara	Anand Raj	Indian National Congress
17	Ballimaran	Sultan Yar Khan	Indian National Congress
18	Chawri Bazar	Nuruddin Ahmad	Indian National Congress
19	Ajmeri Gate	Shafiq Ur Rehman Kidwai	Indian National Congress
20	Sita Ram Bazar Turkman Gate	Shiv Charan Dass	Indian National Congress
21	Sita Ram Bazar Turkman Gate	Sudershan Singh	Indian National Congress
22	Kucha Chelan	Mushtaq Ahmad	Socialist Party
23	Darya Ganj	Gurmukh Nihal Singh	Indian National Congress
24	Chandrawal	Hukam Singh	Indian National Congress
25	Roshanara	Jagan Nath	Indian National Congress
26	Arya Pura	Mangal Dass	Indian National Congress
27	Tokriwalan	Gopinath	Indian National Congress
28	Deputy Ganj	Sham Charan	Bharatiya Jana Sangh
29	Pahari Dhiraj Basti Jullahan	Hem Chand Jain	Indian National Congress
30	Pahari Dhiraj Basti Jullahan	Dhanpat Rai	Indian National Congress
31	Manak Pura	B.D. Joshi	Socialist Party
32	Tibbia College	Ram Singh	Akhil Bharatiya Hindu Mahasabha
33	Naiwala	Dilawar Singh	Bharatiya Jana Sangh
34	Rehgar Pura Dev Nagar	Daya Ram	Indian National Congress
35	Rehgar Pura Dev Nagar	Sushila Nayar	Indian National Congress
36	Kishan Ganj Anad Parbat	Jag Pravesh Chandra	Indian National Congress
37	Civil Lines	Krishna	Indian National Congress
38	Kingsway Camp	Jang bahadur Singh	Bharatiya Jana Sangh
39	Wazirabad	Fateh Singh	Indian National Congress
40	Shahdara	Chinta Mani	Indian National Congress
41	Narela	Mange Ram	Indian National Congress
42	Narela	Prabhu Dayal	Indian National Congress
43	Nangloi	Chaudhary Brahm Prakash	Indian National Congress
44	Khanjhawla	Bhup Singh	Independent
45	Isa Pur	Subedat Hati Singh	Indian National Congress
46	Najaf Garh	Ajit Singh	Indian National Congress
47	Mehrauli	Mitter Sen	Indian National Congress
48	Mehrauli	Sukh Dev	Indian National Congress

== State Reorganization ==
On 1 November 1956, under States Reorganisation Act, 1956, Delhi was made a Union Territory under the direct administration of the President of India and the Delhi Legislative Assembly was abolished simultaneously. Next legislative assembly elections in Delhi were held in 1993, when Union Territory of Delhi was formally declared as National Capital Territory of Delhi by the Sixty-ninth Amendment to the Indian constitution.

== See also ==
- 1951–52 elections in India
- 1993 Delhi Legislative Assembly election
