= Ram Niwas Goel =

6th Speaker of the Delhi Legislative Assembly from 2015 to 2025

7th Speaker of Delhi Legislative Assembly
- In office 14 February 2015 – 20 February 2025
- Lieutenant Governor: Vinai Kumar Saxena
- Deputy: Rakhi Birla
- Preceded by: Maninder Singh Dhir
- Succeeded by: Vijender Gupta

Member of Delhi Legislative Assembly
- In office 14 February 2015 – 8 February 2025
- Preceded by: Jitender Singh Shunty
- Succeeded by: Sanjay Goyal
- Constituency: Shahdara
- In office November 1993 – November 1998
- Preceded by: Constituency established
- Succeeded by: Narender Nath
- Constituency: Shahdara

Personal details
- Born: 5 January 1948 (age 78) Safidon, East Punjab, India (present-day Haryana)
- Party: Aam Aadmi Party
- Other political affiliations: Bharatiya Janata Party
- Spouse: Mithilesh Goel
- Education: Hansraj College, University of Delhi
- Occupation: Businessperson; politician

Ram Niwas Goel (born 5 January 1948) is an Indian politician who served as Speaker of the Delhi Legislative Assembly from 2015 to 2025. He represented the Shahdara constituency in Delhi Legislative Assembly.

== Early life and education ==
Ram Niwas Goel was born in Safidon Mandi, Haryana on 5 January 1948 to a business family. Goel is the eldest of eight siblings (five brothers and three sisters). In 1964, their family moved to Delhi. He completed his secondary and senior secondary education in Haryana and Delhi and subsequently he attended Hansraj College to attain B.Com. degree. He has been actively involved in social work especially in the field of Education & Health for the weaker sections. He has been associated with numerous social organizations active in providing medical services, health services, promotion of religious harmony and servicing kanwad yaatris.

Some of prominent positions held by him from time to time are: Founder Member, Maharaja Agrasen Sewa Sansthan, Pathological Lab, X-Ray, Ultrasound, E.C.G. etc. on not-for-profit basis. Chief Organiser, Delhi-UP Border Shiv Kanwad Samiti which is the most popular camp for Kanwad Yatris in Delhi. Chief Advisor of Maharaja Agrasen Sewa Sangh which provides ambulance service and hearse service to general public on not-for-profit basis.

== Political career ==
Ram Niwas Goel was elected as Speaker of Delhi Legislative Assembly on 23 February 2015. His term as MLA in the Sixth Legislative Assembly of Delhi was his second term and is a member of the Aam Aadmi Party.. He defeated Jitender Singh Shunty of Bhartiya Janata Party by a margin of 11,731 votes in the 2015 Delhi Legislative Assembly elections. In 1993, for the first First Legislative Assembly of Delhi he contested the elections as a BJP candidate and was elected.

== Posts held ==
#	From	To	Position	Comments
01	1993	1998	Member, First Legislative Assembly of Delhi	
02	2015	2020	Speaker Member, Sixth Legislative Assembly of Delhi	
03	2020	2025	Speaker Member, Seventh Legislative Assembly of Delhi	

== Electoral performance ==
Delhi Assembly elections, 2020: Shahdara
Party	Candidate	Votes	%	±%
AAP	Ram Niwas Goel	62,103	49.53	+0.04
BJP	Sanjay Goyal	56,809	45.31	+5.74
INC	Narender Nath	4,474	3.57	−4.4
BSP	Indu	702	0.56	−0.64
NOTA	None of the above	411	0.33	+0.02
Majority		5,294	4.23	−5.69
Turnout		1,25,430	66.22	−3.46
AAP hold		Swing	+0.04	

== See also ==
- First Legislative Assembly of Delhi
- Sixth Legislative Assembly of Delhi
- Seventh Legislative Assembly of Delhi
- Delhi Legislative Assembly
- Government of India
- Politics of India
- Aam Aadmi Party

State Legislative Assembly
Preceded by ?	Member of the Delhi Legislative Assembly from Shahdara Assembly constituency 2020– 2025	Succeeded by Sanjay Goel
