= Hasan Ahmed =

Hasan Ahmed may refer to:

- Hassan Ahmed (actor) (born 1982), Pakistani model and television actor
- Hasan Hafeez Ahmed (1929–1975), Pakistan Navy officer
- Hasan Ahmed (politician), Indian politician
- Hasan Ahmed (cinematographer), Bangladeshi cameraman
- Hassan Ahmed (Ghanaian diplomat) (born 1955), Ghanaian diplomat
- Hassan Ahmed (footballer) (born 1956), Iraqi football player and coach
