= Pawan Kumar Sharma =

Indian politician

MLA Pawan Kumar Sharma

Member of the Legislative Assembly for Adarsh Nagar
- In office Feb 2015 – Feb 2025
- Preceded by: Ram Kishan Singhal
- Succeeded by: Raj Kumar Bhatia

Personal details
- Born: 30 March 1970 (age 56) Hisar district
- Party: Independent
- Other political affiliations: Aam Aadmi Party
- Parent: Hari Ram Sharma (father)
- Profession: Politician, businessperson

Pawan Kumar Sharma is an Indian politician and a member of the Sixth Legislative Assembly of Delhi in India. He represented the Adarsh Nagar constituency of Delhi.

Pawan Kumar Sharma was among 7 MLAs who resigned from the Aam Aadmi Party on 31 January 2025 ahead of 2025 Delhi Legislative Assembly election. Many had resigned after their request for party tickets to contest elections were denied.

== Early life and education ==
Pawan Kumar Sharma was born in Hisar district. He is educated till twelfth grade degree.

== Political career ==
Pawan Kumar Sharma has been a MLA. He represented the Adarsh Nagar constituency from 2015 to 2020.

== Member of the Legislative Assembly ==
He represents Adarsh Nagar (Delhi Assembly constituency) in the Delhi Legislative Assembly. In 2015 he was elected to the Sixth Legislative Assembly of Delhi. In 2020 he was elected to the Seventh Legislative Assembly of Delhi.

== Electoral performance ==
Delhi Assembly elections, 2015: Adarsh Nagar
| Party | Candidate | Votes | % | ±% |
|---|---|---|---|---|
| AAP | Pawan Kumar Sharma | 54,026 | 51.36 | +23.63 |
| BJP | Ram Kishan Singhal | 33,285 | 31.64 | −6.4 |
| INC | Mukesh Kumar Goel | 15,341 | 14.58 | −11.73 |
| NOTA | None of the Above | 459 | 0.43 | −0.37 |
| Majority | | 20,741 | 19.72 | +9.37 |
| Turnout | | 1,05,252 | 66.72 | |
| AAP gain from BJP | | Swing | | |

Delhi Assembly elections, 2020: Adarsh Nagar
| Party | Candidate | Votes | % | ±% |
|---|---|---|---|---|
| AAP | Pawan Sharma | 46,892 | 45.20 | −6.16 |
| BJP | Raj Kumar Bhatia | 45,303 | 43.66 | +12.02 |
| INC | Mukesh Kumar Goel | 10,014 | 9.65 | −4.94 |
| BSP | Chander Pal | 532 | 0.51 | −0.14 |
| NOTA | None of the above | 419 | 0.40 | −0.04 |
| Majority | | 1,589 | 1.54 | −18.18 |
| Turnout | | 1,03,800 | 59.86 | −6.82 |
| AAP hold | | Swing | -6.16 | |

== See also ==
- Aam Aadmi Party
- Politics of India
- Sixth Legislative Assembly of Delhi

State Legislative Assembly
| Preceded by ? | Member of the Delhi Legislative Assembly from Adarsh Nagar, Delhi Assembly constituency 2020– 2025 | Succeeded by Raj Kumar Bhatia |
