= Mangat Ram Singhal =

Indian politician (born 1942)

Minister of Industries, Labour, Land & Building, Employment, Social Welfare, Law, Justice & Legislative Affairs and Election, Government of Delhi
- In office 2003-2013
- Constituency: Adarsh Nagar constituency

Member of Delhi Legislative Assembly for Adarsh Nagar
- In office 1998-2013
- Preceded by: Jai Prakash Yadav
- Succeeded by: Ram Kishan Singhal

Chairman, Works Committee, MCD
- In office 1983-1990

Personal details
- Born: 14 November 1942 (age 83) Delhi, India
- Citizenship: Indian
- Party: Indian National Congress (1977-present)
- Spouse: Angoori Devi
- Children: Sanjay Singal, Ajay Singal, Vinay Singal

Mangat Ram Singhal (born on 14 November 1942) is an Indian politician from Delhi. He has been active in politics since his college days. He belongs to the Indian National Congress. He was elected to the Municipal Corporation of Delhi (MCD) in 1977 for the first time. He was again elected to MCD in 1983. He was also the Chairman of the MCD Works Committee from 1983-1990. He served as a Councillor till 1988. He has thrice served as member of Delhi Legislative Assembly. He was elected to the Second Legislative Assembly for the first time in 1998 and was the Chief Whip of Congress Party in the Delhi Legislative Assembly. He was again elected as a member of Third and Fourth Legislative Assembly and was endowed with the responsibility of Minister of Industry, Land, Social Welfare, Labour & Employment, Law Justice & Legislative Affairs and Elections in Second Dikshit cabinet and Third Dikshit cabinet. He has represented Adarsh Nagar Assembly constituency from 1998 till 2013 in the Delhi Legislative Assembly.

== Positions held ==
Year	Description
1977-1988	Elected to Municipal Corporation of Delhi: Chairman, Works Committee; Chief Whip of Congress Party
1998 - 2003	Elected to 2nd Delhi Assembly for Adarsh Nagar: Chief Whip Of Congress Party
2003 - 2008	Elected to 3rd Delhi Assembly for Adarsh Nagar (2nd term): Cabinet Minister for Industries
2008 - 2013	Elected to 3rd Delhi Assembly for Adarsh Nagar (3rd term): Cabinet Minister for Social Welfare, Labour, Employment, Law, Justice and Legislative Affairs and Election
2011	Chairman, Rural Development Board, Govt. of Delhi

== Electoral performances ==
Year	Constituency	Result	Vote percentage	Opposition Candidate	Opposition Party	Opposition vote percentage
1993	Adarsh Nagar	Lost	34.10%	Jai Prakash Yadav	BJP	34.18%
1998	Adarsh Nagar	Won	61.75%	Jai Prakash Yadav	BJP	32.11%
2003	Adarsh Nagar	Won	47.12%	Ravinder Singh	BJP	39.56%
2008	Adarsh Nagar	Won	44.84%	Ravinder Singh	BJP	39.29%
2013	Adarsh Nagar	Lost	26.31%	Ram Kishan Singhal	BJP	38.08%
