= Adarsh Nagar, Delhi Assembly constituency =

Legislative assembly seat in Delhi

Coordinates: 28.720°N 77.173°E

Adarsh Nagar
- Constituency No. 4 for the Delhi Legislative Assembly

Constituency details
- Country: India
- Region: North India
- State: Delhi
- District: North Delhi
- Reservation: None

Member of Legislative Assembly
- 8th Delhi Legislative Assembly
- Incumbent Raj Kumar Bhatia
- Party: Bharatiya Janata Party
- Elected year: 2025

Adarsh Nagar Assembly constituency is one of the seventy Delhi Legislative Assembly constituencies of Delhi in northern India. Adarsh Nagar is also one of the most posh and upscale colonies in Delhi with large markets, wide roads and big bungalows. It is easily accessible by Delhi Metro, DTC or Metro Feeder Services. It is a crime free region. Adarsh Nagar Assembly constituency is a part of Chandni Chowk Lok Sabha constituency.

== Members of Legislative Assembly ==
Year	Member	Party
1993	Jai Prakash Yadav	Bharatiya Janata Party
1998	Mangat Ram Singhal	Indian National Congress
2003	Mangat Ram Singhal	Indian National Congress
2008	Mangat Ram Singhal	Indian National Congress
2013	Ram Kishan Singhal	Bharatiya Janata Party
2015	Pawan Kumar Sharma	Aam Aadmi Party
2020	Pawan Kumar Sharma	Aam Aadmi Party
2025	Raj Kumar Bhatia	Bharatiya Janata Party

== Election results ==
=== 2025 ===
Delhi Assembly elections, 2025: Adarsh Nagar
Party	Candidate	Votes	%	±%
BJP	Raj Kumar Bhatia	52,510	52.27	+7.07
AAP	Mukesh Kumar Goel	41,028	40.84	−4.36
INC	Shivank Singhal	5,460	5.43	−4.22
NOTA	None of the above	377	0.38	−0.02
Majority		11,482	11.43	+10.89
Turnout		1,00,460	56.55	−3.29
BJP gain from AAP		Swing		

=== 2020 ===
Delhi Assembly elections, 2020: Adarsh Nagar
Party	Candidate	Votes	%	±%
AAP	Pawan Sharma	46,892	45.20	−6.16
BJP	Raj Kumar Bhatia	45,303	43.66	+12.02
INC	Mukesh Kumar Goel	10,014	9.65	−4.94
BSP	Chander Pal	532	0.51	−0.14
NOTA	None of the above	419	0.40	−0.04
Majority		1,589	1.54	−18.18
Turnout		1,03,800	59.86	−6.82
AAP hold		Swing	-6.16	

=== 2015 ===
Delhi Assembly elections, 2015: Adarsh Nagar
Party	Candidate	Votes	%	±%
AAP	Pawan Kumar Sharma	54,026	51.36	+23.63
BJP	Ram Kishan Singhal	33,285	31.64	−6.4
INC	Mukesh Kumar Goel	15,341	14.58	−11.73
NOTA	None of the Above	459	0.43	−0.37
Majority		20,741	19.72	+9.37
Turnout		1,05,252	66.72	
AAP gain from BJP		Swing		

=== 2013 ===
Delhi Assembly elections, 2013: Adarsh Nagar
Party	Candidate	Votes	%	±%
BJP	Ram Kishan Singhal	36,985	38.08	−1.21
AAP	Jagdeep Rana	26,929	27.73	
INC	Mangat Ram Singhal	25,554	26.31	−18.53
BSP	Ashwani Ahuja	5,645	5.81	−6.48
LJP	Archana Singh	284	0.29	−0.35
IDP	Balram Mandal	259	0.27	
Independent	Anil Nagpal	252	0.26	
Independent	Deepak Kumar	232	0.24	
PRC	Kedar Prasad	197	0.20	
NOTA	None of the Above	777	0.80	
Majority		10,056	10.35	
Turnout		96,769	66.44	+7.33
BJP gain from INC		Swing		

=== 2008 ===
Delhi Assembly elections, 2008: Adarsh Nagar
Party	Candidate	Votes	%	±%
INC	Mangat Ram Singhal	36,445	44.84	−2.28
BJP	Ravinder Singh	31,993	39.29	+7.18
BSP	Sanjay Nagpal	9,990	12.29	−1.06
Independent	Sudhir Pathak	753	0.93	
CPI	Ram Saran Ram	654	0.80	
LJP	Vijay Singh Sisodia	520	0.64	
Independent	Sheikh Zahid	259	0.32	
Independent	Lal Singh	223	0.27	
Independent	Vinod Kumar	118	0.15	
Independent	Ajay Kumar	112	0.14	
Independent	Vijender Kumar	96	0.12	
Independent	Rajeev	93	0.11	
MBP	Sunil Kumar Gupta	79	0.10	
Majority		4,512	5.55	
Turnout		81,275	59.12	+10.31
INC hold		Swing		

=== 2003 ===
Delhi Legislative Assembly election, 2003: Adarsh Nagar
Party	Candidate	Votes	%	±%
INC	Mangat Ram Singhal	29,290	47.12	−14.63
BJP	Ravinder Singh	19,958	32.11	+2.23
BSP	Rajesh Chauhan	8,296	13.35	+7.44
NCP	Ajay Tyagi	2,677	4.31	
RJD	Inderjeet	749	1.20	
Independent	Sarla Devi	275	0.44	
SP	Kripa Shanker	258	0.42	
SS	Suresh Tomar	173	0.28	+0.21
BKRP	Sarla Singh Rajpasi	158	0.25	
JPJD	Iqbal Qureshi	148	0.24	
Independent	Abdul Rehman	108	0.17	
RJP	Vishbhnath Mehto	69	0.11	
Majority		9,332	15.01	
Turnout		62,159	48.81	−1.27
INC hold		Swing		

=== 1998 ===
Delhi Assembly elections, 1998: Adarsh Nagar
Party	Candidate	Votes	%	±%
INC	Mangat Ram Singhal	37,818	61.75	+27.65
BJP	Jai Prakash Yadav	18,300	29.88	−4.30
BSP	Shiv Charan Bhaskar	3,620	5.91	−2.04
JD	Pardip Skhokin	839	1.37	−7.34
Independent	Dr Kishan Kumar Goyal	223	0.36	
LKD	Rajni George	142	0.23	
Independent	Shiv Kumar Bhardwaj	96	0.16	
RMEP	Virender Singh	96	0.16	
SS	Ajay Kumar	45	0.07	
Independent	Vijay Gupta	44	0.07	
Independent	Avdesh Mishra	25	0.04	
Majority		19,518	31.87	
Turnout		61,248	50.08	−14.76
INC gain from BJP		Swing		

=== 1993 ===
Delhi Assembly elections, 1993: Adarsh Nagar
Party	Candidate	Votes	%	±%
BJP	Jai Prakash Yadav	17,020	34.18	
INC	Mangat Ram Singhal	16,980	34.10	
Independent	Guru Surender Vig	5,930	11.91	
JD	Lakshmi Chand Singhal	4,335	8.71	
BSP	Shiv Charan	3,958	7.95	
CPI	Ram Saran Ram	727	1.46	
RMEP	Virender Singh	162	0.33	
DPP	Kunal	145	0.29	
Independent	Karunesh	92	0.18	
IC(S)	Sat Prakash Gupta	75	0.15	
Independent	Ashok Khurana	63	0.13	
Independent	Shiv Kumar	54	0.11	
Independent	Om Prakash	50	0.10	
Independent	Sushil Kr Goel	41	0.08	
Independent	Dharam Pal	36	0.07	
Independent	Surender Kumar	33	0.07	
Independent	Rajiv Kumar	30	0.06	
Independent	Ram Chander	22	0.04	
Independent	S P Gupta	21	0.04	
Independent	Balraj Gulati	20	0.04	
Majority		40	0.08	
Turnout		49,794	64.84	
BJP win (new seat)				

== See also ==
- First Legislative Assembly of Delhi
- Second Legislative Assembly of Delhi
- Third Legislative Assembly of Delhi
- Fourth Legislative Assembly of Delhi
- Fifth Legislative Assembly of Delhi
- Sixth Legislative Assembly of Delhi
