= Dilip Pandey =

Indian politician

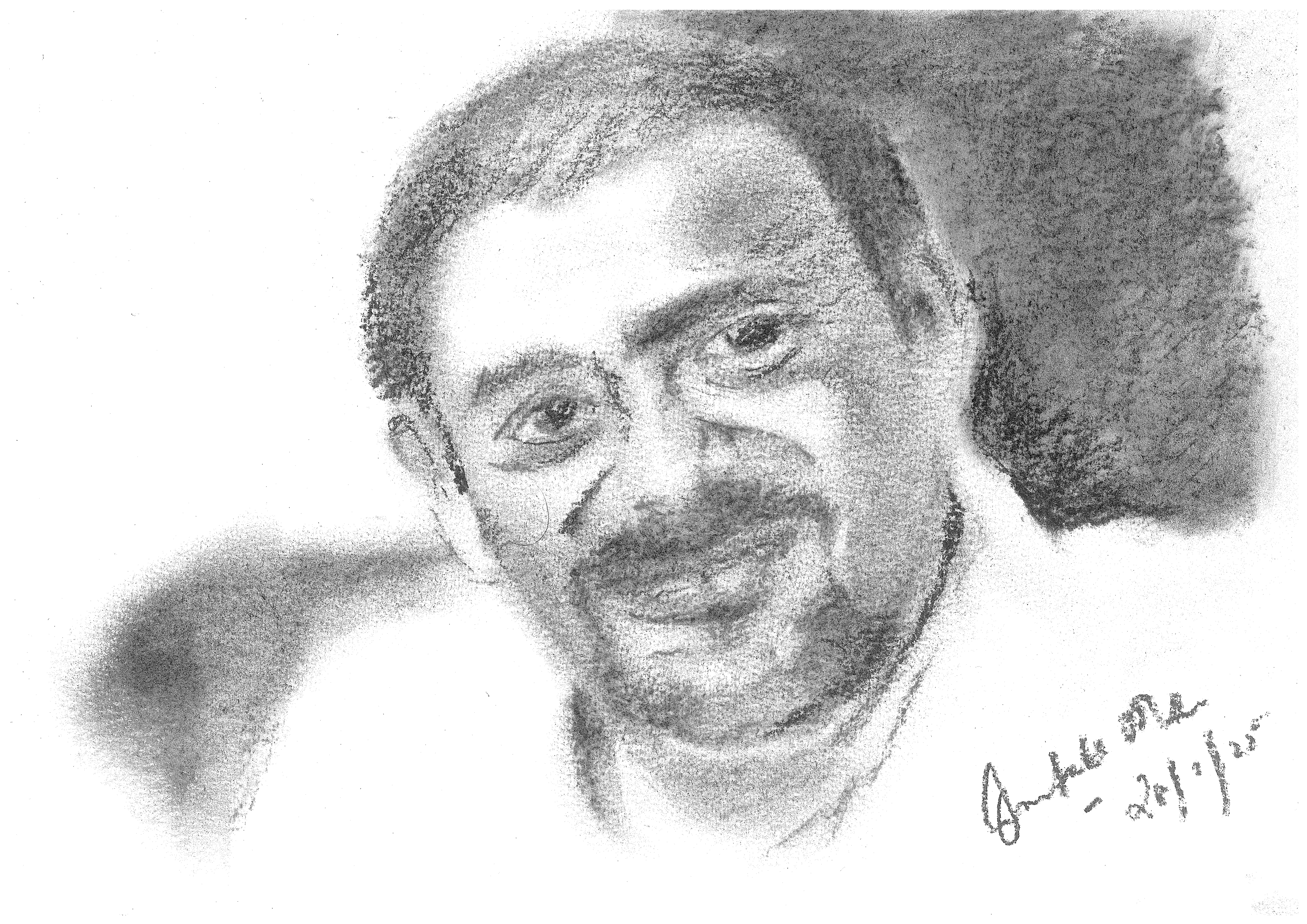
- Charcoal on paper drawing of Dilip Pandey by Amitabh Mitra

Member of the Delhi Legislative Assembly
- In office 12 February 2020 – 8 February 2025
- Preceded by: Pankaj Pushkar
- Succeeded by: Surya Prakash Khatri
- Constituency: Timarpur

Spokesperson of Aam Aadmi Party
- Incumbent
- Assumed office 2014

Covenor Aam Aadmi Party, Delhi
- In office 2015–2017
- Preceded by: Ashutosh

Personal details
- Born: 1 October 1980 (age 45) Zamania Uttar Pradesh, India
- Party: Aam Aadmi Party
- Spouse: Priyanka Pandey
- Children: 2
- Profession: Activist, politician, novelist
- Website: Official website

Dilip Pandey (born 1 October 1980) is an Indian politician and has represented Timarpur as a Member of the Delhi Legislative Assembly from 2020 to 2025. He was the Convenor of the Delhi Unit of Aam Aadmi Party (AAP) between July 2014 and April 2017.

== Career ==
Pandey left his software job in 2013 to join the AAP. Prior to this, Pandey worked for the Indian IT Major Tata Consultancy Services as a business consultant until FY 2011 and was posted at their Bangalore office.

== Political career ==
Pandey participated in the Anna Hazare Movement. He is a spokesperson and member of the screening committee of the Aam Aadmi Party. In January 2014, Pandey was appointed secretary for AAP political activities in the national capital.

He took over as the convenor of the Delhi unit in July 2014. Under his co-convenorship, the AAP won 67 out of 70 seats in 2015 Delhi assembly elections. Pandey later submitted his resignation in April 2017 after the AAP failed to get the majority in the 2017 MCD elections.

He served as the official Spokesperson of the Aam Aadmi Party from 2014 to 2024.

Dilip has been nominated as the Aam Aadmi Party’s in-charge for Delhi's North East Lok Sabha constituency for the 2019 General Elections.

He defeated BJP's Surinder Pal Singh (Bittoo) in the 2020 Delhi Legislative Assembly election to win the Timarpur (Vidhan Sabha constituency).

MLA Dilip Pandey was appointed Aam Aadmi Party's chief whip in the Delhi Assembly in March 2020.

== Electoral performance ==
Delhi Assembly elections, 2020: Timarpur
Party	Candidate	Votes	%	±%
AAP	Dilip Pandey	71,432	57.60	+6.55
BJP	Surinder Pal Singh (Bittoo)	47,288	38.13	+3.43
INC	Amar Lata Sangwan	3,102	2.50	−9.09
NOTA	None of the above	508	0.41	−0.03
AAP(S)	Sonu Kaushik	495	0.40	N/A
Majority		24,144	19.47	+3.12
Turnout		1,24,052	60.93	−5.90
AAP hold		Swing	+6.55	

== Bibliography ==
- Pandey, Dilip (2014). Dahleez Par Dil 'दहलीज़ पर दिल'. Delhi: Penguin. ISBN 9780143422969.
- Pandey, Dilip (2016). Khulti Girhein 'खुलती गिरहें'. Delhi: Rajkamal Prakashan. ISBN 9788126728480. Archived from the original on 8 January 2016.

Aam Aadmi Party political offices
Preceded by Ashutosh	State Convener of AAP, Delhi; 2015 – 2017	Incumbent
New political party	Spokesperson of AAP ? – present	Incumbent
State Legislative Assembly
Preceded by Pankaj Pushkar	Member of the Delhi Legislative Assembly from Timarpur Assembly constituency 2020–	Incumbent
