= Timarpur Assembly constituency =

Legislative assembly seat in Delhi

Coordinates: 28.702°N 77.221°E

Timarpur
- Constituency No. 3 for the Delhi Legislative Assembly

Constituency details
- Country: India
- Region: North India
- State: Delhi
- District: North West Delhi, North Delhi
- Reservation: None

Member of Legislative Assembly
- 8th Delhi Legislative Assembly
- Incumbent Surya Prakash Khatri
- Party: Bharatiya Janata Party
- Elected year: 2025

Timarpur Assembly constituency is one of the seventy legislative assembly constituencies of Delhi in northern India. Timarpur assembly constituency is a part of North East Delhi Lok Sabha constituency.

== Members of Legislative Assembly ==
Year	Member	Party
1993	Rajender Gupta	Bharatiya Janata Party
1998	Jagdish Anand	Indian National Congress
2003	Surinder Pal Singh	Indian National Congress
2008	Surinder Pal Singh	Indian National Congress
2013	Harish Khanna	Aam Aadmi Party
2015	Pankaj Pushkar	Aam Aadmi Party
2020	Dilip Pandey	Aam Aadmi Party
2025	Surya Prakash Khatri	Bharatiya Janata Party

== Election results ==
=== 2025 ===
Delhi Assembly elections, 2025
Party	Candidate	Votes	%	±%
BJP	Surya Prakash Khatri	55,941	46.23	▲8.10
AAP	Surinder Pal Singh	54,773	45.27	▼12.33
INC	Lokendra Chaudhary	8,361	6.91	▲4.41
NOTA	None of the above	663	0.54	▲0.14
Majority		1,168	0.96	▼19.51
Turnout		1,20,988	55.98	▼4.95
BJP gain from AAP		Swing		

=== 2020 ===
Delhi Assembly elections, 2020: Timarpur
Party	Candidate	Votes	%	±%
AAP	Dilip Pandey	71,432	57.60	+6.55
BJP	Surinder Pal Singh	47,288	38.13	+3.43
INC	Amar Sangwan	3,102	2.50	−9.09
NOTA	None of the above	508	0.41	−0.03
AAP(S)	Sonu Kaushik	495	0.40	N/A
Majority		24,144	19.47	+3.12
Turnout		1,24,052	60.93	−5.90
AAP hold		Swing	+6.55	

=== 2015 ===
Delhi Assembly elections, 2015: Timarpur
Party	Candidate	Votes	%	±%
AAP	Pankaj Pushkar	64,477	51.05	+16.02
BJP	Rajni Abbi	43,830	34.70	+2.66
INC	Surinder Pal Singh	14,642	11.59	−17.41
BSP	Manoj Singh	592	0.47	−0.78
NOTA	None	555	0.44	−0.24
Majority		20,647	16.35	+13.36
Turnout		1,26,364	66.86	
AAP hold		Swing	+16.02	

=== 2013 ===
Delhi Assembly elections, 2013: Timarpur
Party	Candidate	Votes	%	±%
AAP	Harish Khanna	39,650	35.03	
BJP	Rajni Abbi	36,267	32.04	−9.44
INC	Surinder Pal Singh	32,825	29.00	−15.14
BSP	Prem Wadhwa	1,414	1.25	−9.22
CPI	Bajinder Singh	637	0.56	
SP	Anil Kumar	349	0.31	−0.55
IJP	Harbilas	226	0.20	
BJD(I)	Jagannath	173	0.15	
RJP	Vidyanand Bhagat	70	0.06	−0.04
PECP	Mohd Yamin	51	0.05	
NOTA	None	768	0.68	
Majority		3,383	2.99	+2.23
Turnout		1,13,195	65.98	
AAP gain from INC		Swing		

=== 2008 ===
Delhi Assembly elections, 2008: Timarpur
Party	Candidate	Votes	%	±%
INC	Surinder Pal Singh	39,997	44.14	−9.72
BJP	Surya Prakash Khatri	37,584	41.48	−1.64
BSP	Sanjeev Kumar	9,491	10.47	
SP	Apramay Mishra	775	0.86	
ABHM	Shyam Gopal	706	0.78	+0.24
Independent	Mohd Kamil	343	0.38	
Independent	Raju Gupta	293	0.32	
Independent	Ranjit Singh	245	0.27	
NCP	Mahfooz Ali	240	0.26	−0.20
Independent	Rajesh Kumar	205	0.23	
LJP	Mhd Raziur Rehman	165	0.18	−0.24
Independent	Rajesh Singh	154	0.17	
Independent	Kripal Singh Bittoo	132	0.15	
Independent	Modh Yameen	128	0.14	
RJP	Dropti	88	0.10	
Independent	Ajay Singh	67	0.07	
Majority		832	0.76	−9.98
Turnout		90,613	59.3	+6.49
INC hold		Swing	-9.72	

=== 2003 ===
Delhi Assembly elections, 2003: Timarpur
Party	Candidate	Votes	%	±%
INC	Surinder Pal Singh	29,952	53.86	+1.59
BJP	Rajendra Gupta	23,978	43.12	+5.82
ABHM	Anand Singh	298	0.54	
Independent	Suraj Prakash	281	0.51	
NCP	Rajni Sodhi	255	0.46	
Independent	Mohd Yamin	246	0.44	
LJP	Mohd Abrar	236	0.42	
IJP	Tilak Raj Jatav	91	0.16	
Independent	Sardar Kaur	88	0.16	
Independent	Sukhmit Singh	82	0.15	
JP	Rajeev Kumar	71	0.13	
Independent	Mukesh Kumar	31	0.06	
Majority		5,974	10.74	−4.23
Turnout		55,609	52.81	+2.78
INC hold		Swing	+1.59	

=== 1998 ===
Delhi Assembly elections, 1998: Timarpur
Party	Candidate	Votes	%	±%
INC	Jagdish Anand	27,411	52.27	+11.09
BJP	Raghuvansh Singhal	19,559	37.30	−13.27
Independent	Surinder Pal Singh	2,809	5.36	
SP	Bhagwan Singh	555	1.06	+0.86
JD	Tilak Raj Jatav	529	1.01	−3.76
BSP	Ashok Kumar Sonkar	489	0.93	
Independent	Jagan Nath	260	0.50	
Independent	Sanjeev Kumar	253	0.48	
Independent	Yogender	184	0.35	
Independent	Dr Mange Ram Acharya	114	0.22	
Independent	Kailash Kaushik	71	0.14	
SJP(R)	Ram Niwas Rathore	67	0.13	
Independent	Harminder Singh	50	0.10	
KMM	Tanveer Kumar Marwah	39	0.07	
Independent	Sudhir Madan	27	0.05	
Independent	Anwar Khan	22	0.04	−0.36
Majority		7,852	28.41	+14.97
Turnout		52,349	50.03	−16.67
INC gain from BJP		Swing	+11.09	

=== 1993 ===
Delhi Assembly elections, 1993: Timarpur
Party	Candidate	Votes	%	±%
BJP	Rajender Gupta	27,732	50.57	
INC	Hari Shanker Gupta	22,176	41.18	
JD	Nathi Singh Baghel	2,569	4.77	
Independent	Bhola Nath Babbar	501	0.93	
Independent	Arun Kaushik	302	0.56	
Independent	Anwar Khan	217	0.40	
DPP	Kanchan Gupta	178	0.33	
Independent	Rama Shanker	112	0.21	
SP	P K Sharma	110	0.20	
Independent	Sunil	83	0.15	
Independent	Jagdish Prasad	71	0.13	
Independent	Joginder	68	0.13	
Independent	Gokal Chand	45	0.08	
Independent	Gurucharan Singh Pahwa	38	0.07	
BKD	Virender Pal Gill	36	0.07	
Independent	Balmiki	28	0.05	
Independent	Mukesh	27	0.05	
Independent	Amarjeet Singh	20	0.04	
RMEP	Anil Kumar	19	0.04	
Independent	Madan Mohan	19	0.04	
Majority		5,056	9.39	
Turnout		53,851	66.70	
BJP hold		Swing		
