= Sharad Chauhan =

Indian politician

Member of the Delhi Legislative Assembly
- In office 7 February 2015 – 8 February 2025
- Preceded by: Neeldaman Khatri
- Succeeded by: Raj Karan Khatri
- Constituency: Nerela

Personal details
- Born: Delhi, India
- Party: Aam Aadmi Party

Sharad Kumar (also known as Sharad Chauhan) is an Indian politician, from the Aam Aadmi Party (AAP). He was a member of the Sixth Legislative Assembly of Delhi (MLA) from Nerela constituency also elected as Parliament Secretary of Revenue.

== Personal life ==
Sharad Chauhan was born to Zile Singh (father) and Vidhya Devi on 29 June 1975 in Narela (Nerela) area of Delhi. He has two elder brothers. His eldest brother, Akhil Chauhan, is an engineer and a District Manager in Tata Power Delhi Distribution Limited (TPDDL) in Rohini. His second brother, Vikas Chauhan is a doctor and owns a hospital in Mumbai. He is married to Reeta Chauhan (Reeta) and has two sons Abhinav and Archit. His wife is a councillor from Municipal Corporation of Delhi (MCD) and a housewife.

As per his affidavit for elections, his self-declared profession is farmer; the AAP party website describes him as a social worker. Chauhan is a matriculate (Xth standard) and passed from Government Boys Senior Secondary School, Bakhtawarpur in 1995. His wealth is ₹2.60 crore, as per his affidavit. He currently resides in Bakoli village in Delhi.

In 2016, he was arrested with six others in the suicide case of a girl named Soni from Narela for which he was granted bail.

== Political career ==
Earlier, Chauhan was with Bahujan Samaj Party (BSP). He was elected as a councillor from MCD, Ward 4, Bakhtawarpur in 2007 by 6,593 votes; his wife is the councillor who currently represents the ward. She won the seat in 2012 by 15,975 votes after it was reserved for women. He lost the 2008 Delhi Legislative Assembly elections by a narrow margin of 800 votes on a BSP ticket against Jaswant Singh of the Indian National Congress (INC) party.

Chauhan switched to the Aam Aadmi Party (AAP) from the BSP, just before the 2015 elections. Chauhan fought the elections from the Nerela constituency. He got 96,143 votes and defeated his nearest rival and sitting MLA Neel Daman Khatri of the Bharatiya Janata Party (BJP) by a margin of 40,292 in the 2015 Delhi Legislative Assembly elections. The AAP won 67 out of the total 70 seats in the elections. He lost in the 2025 Delhi Legislative Assembly election.

== See also ==
- Sixth Legislative Assembly of Delhi
- Delhi Legislative Assembly
- Aam Aadmi Party

== Electoral performance ==
=== 2025 ===
Delhi Assembly elections, 2025: Narela
Party	Candidate	Votes	%	±%
BJP	Raj Karan Khatri	87,215	50.20	▲8.66
AAP	Sharad Chauhan	78,619	45.26	▼6.8
INC	Aruna Kumari	6782	3.9	▲0.12
ASP(KR)	Khalid	278	0.16	▲0.16
NOTA	None of the above	981	0.56	▲0.11
Majority		8596	4.94	
Turnout		173,703	61.85	−3.49
BJP gain from AAP		Swing		

Delhi Assembly elections, 2008: Nerela
Party	Candidate	Votes	%	±%
INC	Jaswant Singh	34,662	31.66	
BSP	Sharad Chauhan	33,830	30.90	
BJP	Ajit Singh	29,754	27.17	
Independent	Raj Singh Khatri	5,041	4.60	
LJP	Amit Kumar	1,704	1.56	
Majority		832	0.76	
Turnout		1,09,494	56.80	
INC win (new seat)				

Delhi Assembly elections, 2015: Narela
Party	Candidate	Votes	%	±%
AAP	Sharad Chauhan	96,143	59.97	+43.26
BJP	Neel Daman Khatri	55,851	34.84	−3.11
INC	Praveen Kumar Bhugra	4,643	2.90	−15.38
BSP	Roopesh Bhardwaj	1,662	1.04	−20.55
NOTA	None of the Above	767	0.48	−0.17
Majority		40,292	25.13	+8.77
Turnout		1,60,339	66.52	−1.39
AAP gain from BJP		Swing	+23.19	

Delhi Assembly elections, 2020: Narela
Party	Candidate	Votes	%	±%
AAP	Sharad Chauhan	86,262	52.06	−7.91
BJP	Neel Daman Khatri	68,833	41.54	+6.70
INC	Siddharth Kundu	6,270	3.78	+0.88
BSP	Mahendar Choudhary	821	0.50	−0.54
NOTA	None of the above	753	0.45	−0.03
Majority		17,429	10.52	−14.61
Turnout		1,65,963	65.34	−1.17
AAP hold		Swing	−7.91	

State Legislative Assembly
Preceded by ?	Member of the Delhi Legislative Assembly from Nerela Assembly constituency 2020– 2025	Succeeded by Raj Karan Khatri
