= Jitender Singh Shunty =

Indian politician (born 1962)

Padma Shri Jitender Singh Shunty
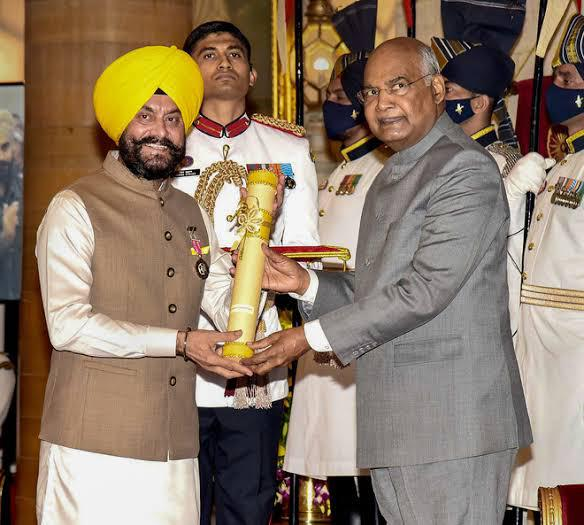
- Jitender Singh Shunty and President Ram Nath Kovind

Member of Delhi Legislative Assembly
- In office 2013–2015
- Preceded by: Narender Nath
- Succeeded by: Ram Niwas Goel
- Constituency: Shahdara

Personal details
- Born: 1 August 1962 (age 63)
- Party: Aam Aadmi Party
- Awards: Padma Shree Awardee

Jitender Singh Shunty (born 1 August 1962), is an Indian politician and social worker. Shunty was elected as a member of the Legislative Assembly from Shahdara from Bhartiya Janta Party in 2013. He is the founder of Shaheed Bhagat Singh Seva Dal, an NGO that helps to cremate unclaimed bodies and immerse the ashes as guided by the Hindu and Sikh religion. It all started after an incident in 1996 at a crematorium.

== Biography ==
Jitender Singh Shunty founded the Shaheed Bhagat Singh Seva Dal in 1996. He started his career in politics as an independent councillor from Jhilmil ward in Delhi. However, he became a part of the BJP in 2008 and contested the councillor elections from Jhilmil ward of the East municipal corporation and won the elections. He contested his first Delhi Assembly election in 2013, and won from the Shahdara constituency with 45,364 votes.

In September 2014, an unidentified gunman shot at him but missed. Shunty had been reportedly attacked twice before this in 2013 and 2007. The incident happened at his residence in Vivek Vihar in Delhi. In December 2018, Shunty filed an FIR against actor Nasiruddin Shah for his statement saying that he was worried about the security of his children in India. In 2021, Jitender Singh Shunty received India's prestigious award Padma Shri for his services during Covid crises. Jitender Singh Shunty dedicates his Padma Shri Award to fellow frontline workers.

== Awards and achievements ==
- 'First Sikh in the world to donate blood 100 times' and the title of 'Donor Singh', awarded by Delhi State Blood Transfusion Council
- ISBTI- Chapter award for donating blood 70 times
- 100 times Blood Donor World Record in World Book of Records
- Centurion Award by The National Blood Transfusion Council (Government of India) & Delhi State Blood Transfusion Council (Govt. of NCT of Delhi)
- Padma Shri Award for social contribution during COVID.

== See also ==
- 2013 Delhi Legislative Assembly election
- Shahdara (Delhi Assembly constituency)
