= Surya Prakash Khatri =

Indian politician

Member of the Delhi Legislative Assembly
- Incumbent
- Assumed office 10 February 2025
- Preceded by: Dilip Pandey
- Constituency: Timarpur

Personal details
- Political party: Bharatiya Janata Party

Surya Prakash Khatri is an Indian politician from Delhi affiliated with Bharatiya Janata Party. He was elected as a Member of the Legislative Assembly in the 2025 Delhi Legislative Assembly election from Timarpur Assembly constituency.
