= Shahdara Assembly constituency =

Constituency of the Delhi legislative assembly in India

Coordinates: 28.684°N 77.264°E

Shahdara
- Constituency No. 62 for the Delhi Legislative Assembly

Constituency details
- Country: India
- Region: North India
- State: Delhi
- District: Shahdara
- Established: 1993
- Reservation: None

Member of Legislative Assembly
- 8th Delhi Legislative Assembly
- Incumbent Sanjay Goyal
- Party: Bharatiya Janata Party
- Elected year: 2025

Shahdara Assembly constituency is one of the seventy Delhi assembly constituencies of Delhi in northern India. Shahdara assembly constituency is a part of East Delhi (Lok Sabha constituency).

== Members of the Legislative Assembly ==
Year	Member	Party
1993	Ram Niwas Goel	Bharatiya Janata Party
1998	Narender Nath	Indian National Congress
2003	Narender Nath	Indian National Congress
2008	Narender Nath	Indian National Congress
2013	Jitender Singh Shunty	Shiromani Akali Dal
2015	Ram Niwas Goel	Aam Aadmi Party
2020	Ram Niwas Goel	Aam Aadmi Party
2025	Sanjay Goyal	Bharatiya Janata Party

== Election results ==
=== 2025 ===
Delhi Assembly elections, 2025: Shahdara
Party	Candidate	Votes	%	±%
BJP	Sanjay Goyal	62,788	49.63	
AAP	Jitender Singh Shunty	57,610	45.54	
INC	Jagat Singh	3,862	3.50	
NOTA	None of the above	558	0.44	
Majority		5,178	4.09	
Turnout		1,26,517		
BJP gain from AAP		Swing		

=== 2020 ===
Delhi Assembly elections, 2020: Shahdara
Party	Candidate	Votes	%	±%
AAP	Ram Niwas Goel	62,103	49.53	+0.04
BJP	Sanjay Goyal	56,809	45.31	+5.74
INC	Narender Nath	4,474	3.57	−4.4
BSP	Indu	702	0.56	−0.64
NOTA	None of the above	411	0.33	+0.02
Majority		5,294	4.23	−5.69
Turnout		1,25,430	66.22	−3.46
AAP hold		Swing	+0.04	

=== 2015 ===
Delhi Assembly elections, 2015: Shahdara
Party	Candidate	Votes	%	±%
AAP	Ram Niwas Goel	58,523	49.49	+27.23
BJP	Jitender Singh Shunty	46,792	39.57	−3.39
INC	Narender Nath	9,423	7.97	−20.67
Independent	Behen Preeti	1,289	1.09	
BSP	Rajpal Singh	1,276	1.08	−1.04
NOTA	None	368	0.31	−0.25
Majority		11,731	9.92	−4.39
Turnout		1,18,432	69.68	
AAP gain from SAD		Swing	+27.23	

=== 2013 ===
Delhi Assembly elections, 2013: Shahdara
Party	Candidate	Votes	%	±%
SAD	Jitender Singh Shunty	45,364	42.96	−0.17
INC	Dr Narender Nath	30,247	28.64	−16.25
AAP	Balbir Singh	23,512	22.26	
Independent	Anchal Sharma	2,725	2.58	
BSP	Bhim Singh	2,239	2.12	−7.16
IDP	Tasavvar	230	0.22	
NCP	Nikunj Sharma	229	0.22	
SP	Akeel	132	0.12	−0.04
Independent	Vandana	124	0.12	
CPI(M)	Ram Kanwar	121	0.11	
Independent	Ishwar Dass	89	0.08	
NOTA	None	595	0.56	
Majority		15,117	14.31	+12.55
Turnout		105,624	67.64	
SAD gain from INC		Swing		

=== 2008 ===
Delhi Assembly elections, 2008: Shahdara
Party	Candidate	Votes	%	±%
INC	Dr Narender Nath	39,194	44.89	+2.03
BJP	Jitender Singh Shunty	37,658	43.13	+21.79
BSP	Vijay Pal	38,658	9.28	−3.75
RJD	Neelam Kumari	669	0.77	
Independent	Suresh Kumar	427	0.49	
Independent	Tahira Mirza	207	0.24	
SS	Mahandra Manchanda	192	0.22	
VAJP	Subhash Gahlot	176	0.20	
Independent	Sanjay Lohia	153	0.18	
SP	Subhash Mishra	141	0.16	
Independent	Naveen Prakash Goyal	125	0.14	
Independent	Rangi Lal Yadav	117	0.13	
Independent	Manish Gupta	90	0.10	−0.14
Independent	Asgar Malik	64	0.07	
Majority		1,536	1.76	−19.63
Turnout		87,317	57.1	+0.23
INC hold		Swing		

=== 2003 ===
Delhi Assembly elections, 2003: Shahdara
Party	Candidate	Votes	%	±%
INC	Dr Narender Nath	26,423	42.86	−13.00
Independent	Jitender Singh Shunty	13,238	21.47	
BJP	Ved Vyas Mahajan	13,155	21.34	−17.27
BSP	Chaman Lal Yadav	8,032	13.03	+10.92
Independent	Laxman Singh Sisodia	237	0.38	
Independent	Tara Chand	197	0.32	
Independent	Manish Gupta	150	0.24	
RJP	Dhanoj	117	0.19	
JPJD	Malvinder Kaur Mehta	97	0.16	
Majority		13,185	21.39	+4.14
Turnout		61,646	56.87	+6.96
INC hold		Swing		

=== 1998 ===
Delhi Assembly elections, 1998: Shahdara
Party	Candidate	Votes	%	±%
INC	Dr Narender Nath	29,929	55.86	+25.50
BJP	Jyotsna Aggarwal	20,689	38.61	−14.71
BSP	Dharmendra Kumar	1,130	2.11	−1.24
SS	Prayagraj Gupta	818	1.53	
JD	Mahinder Singh	348	0.65	−7.93
Lok Shakti	S Chander Shekhar	236	0.44	
RPI	Prithvi Raj Kain	165	0.31	
IC(S)	Kamal Kishroe Tripathi	155	0.29	+0.07
BKD(J)	Tribhuvan Prasad	113	0.21	
Majority		240	17.25	−5.71
Turnout		53,583	49.91	−15.41
INC gain from BJP		Swing		

=== 1993 ===
Delhi Assembly elections, 1993: Shahdara
Party	Candidate	Votes	%	±%
BJP	Ram Niwas Goel	28,253	53.32	
INC	Chaman Lal Yadav	16,086	30.36	
JD	Ram Kishor Gupta	4,549	8.58	
BSP	Dal Chand	1,777	3.35	
Independent	Rajesh Chand	567	1.07	
CPI	Vinay Sahdev	339	0.64	
Independent	Rakesh Kumar Gupta Alias Munna	336	0.63	
BKD	Ajab Singh Bagri	228	0.43	
Independent	Lekh Singh	118	0.22	
IC(S)	Amrik Singh	117	0.22	
Independent	Kamal Maheshwari ‘Darpan’	98	0.18	
BRP	Bal Kishan Malhotra	79	0.15	
Independent	Hari Charan	79	0.15	
RMEP	Shyam Singh	50	0.09	
Independent	Jaginder Singh	40	0.08	
Doordarshi Party	Rukmani Devi	38	0.07	
NDPF	Anil Kumar	38	0.07	
Independent	Chatter Singh	37	0.07	
BRD	Shyam Lal	33	0.06	
LKD	Prem Kumar	33	0.06	
Mukt Bharat	Poshkar Koul Vakil	27	0.05	
Independent	Bhag Singh	19	0.04	
Independent	Lok Nath	17	0.03	
Independent	Anil	16	0.03	
Independent	Sandeep	14	0.03	
Majority		12,167	22.96	
Turnout		52,988	65.32	
BJP win (new seat)				
