= Delhi Cantonment Assembly constituency =

Constituency of the Delhi legislative assembly in India

Coordinates: 28.594°N 77.128°E

Delhi Cantt
- Constituency No. 38 for the Delhi Legislative Assembly

Constituency details
- Country: India
- Region: North India
- State: Delhi
- District: New Delhi
- Lok Sabha constituency: New Delhi
- Established: 1993
- Reservation: None

Member of Legislative Assembly
- 8th Delhi Legislative Assembly
- Incumbent Virender Singh Kadian
- Party: Aam Aadmi Party
- Elected year: 2025

Delhi Cantt Assembly constituency, sometimes referred to as Delhi Cantonment is one of the legislative assembly constituencies of Delhi in northern India. Delhi Cantt Assembly constituency is a part of New Delhi Lok Sabha constituency. Voter-verified paper audit trail (VVPAT) will be used along with EVMs in Delhi Cantt assembly constituency in 2015 Delhi Legislative Assembly election. 26/11 hero Surinder Singh won this seat in 2013 by 355 votes.

== Members of the Legislative Assembly ==
Election	Name	Party
1993	Karan Tanwar	Bharatiya Janata Party
1998	Kiran Chaudhary	Indian National Congress
2003	Karan Tanwar	Bharatiya Janata Party
2008	Karan Tanwar	Bharatiya Janata Party
2013	Surinder Singh Dalal	Aam Aadmi Party
2015	Surinder Singh Dalal	Aam Aadmi Party
2020	Virender Singh Kadian	Aam Aadmi Party
2025	Virender Singh Kadian	Aam Aadmi Party

== Election results ==
Vote share of winning candidates
2025	46.76%
2020	49.17%
2015	51.82%
2013	39.67%
2008	55.58%
2003	52.52%
1998	51.94%
1993	59.85%

=== 2025 ===
Delhi Assembly elections, 2025: Delhi Cantt
Party	Candidate	Votes	%	±%
AAP	Virender Singh Kadian	22,191	46.76	▼2.31
BJP	Bhuvan Tanwar	20,162	42.48	▲11.29
INC	Pradeep Kumar Upmanyu	4,252	8.96	▼4.19
NOTA	None of the Above	330	0.7	
Majority		2029	4.28	▼13.76
Turnout		47,458	59.30	▲13.82
AAP hold		Swing		

=== 2020 ===
Delhi Assembly elections, 2020: Delhi Cantt
Party	Candidate	Votes	%	±%
AAP	Virender Singh Kadian	28,971	49.17	−2.65
BJP	Manish Singh	18,381	31.19	−6.17
INC	Sandeep Tanwar	7,954	13.15	+4.00
BSP	Nand Kishore Beniwal	1,823	3.09	+2.49
NCP	Surendra Singh	908	1.54	
Majority		10,590	18.04	+3.58
Turnout		58,994	45.48	−13.11
AAP hold		Swing	-2.65	

=== 2015 ===
Delhi Assembly elections, 2015: Delhi Cantt
Party	Candidate	Votes	%	±%
AAP	Surinder Singh	40,133	51.82	+12.15
BJP	Karan Singh Tanwar	28,935	37.36	−1.77
INC	Sandeep Tanwar	7,087	9.15	−9.05
BSP	Gyan Chand	467	0.60	−0.53
NOTA	None of the above	326	0.42	−0.31
Majority		11,198	14.46	+13.92
Turnout		77,470	58.59	
AAP hold		Swing	+12.15	

=== 2013 ===
Delhi Assembly elections, 2013: Delhi Cantt
Party	Candidate	Votes	%	±%
AAP	Surinder Singh	26,124	39.67	New entry
BJP	Karan Singh Tanwar	25,769	39.13	−16.45
INC	Ashok Kumar Jain	11,988	18.20	−20.35
BSP	Rajesh Pihal	745	1.13	−2.37
NOTA	None	478	0.73	
Majority		355	0.54	−16.49
Turnout		65,891	60.22	
AAP gain from BJP		Swing		

=== 2008 ===
Delhi Assembly elections, 2008: Delhi Cantt
Party	Candidate	Votes	%	±%
BJP	Karan Singh Tanwar	23,696	55.58	+3.06
INC	Ashok Ahuja	16,435	38.55	−4.83
BSP	Shrichand Chauhan	1,492	3.50	
Majority		7,261	17.03	+7.89
Turnout		42,633	56.6	+2.92
BJP hold		Swing	+3.06	

=== 2003 ===
Delhi Assembly elections, 2003: Delhi Cantt
Party	Candidate	Votes	%	±%
BJP	Karan Singh Tanwar	21,638	52.52	+6.40
INC	Kiran Choudhary	17,872	43.38	−8.56
NCP	Amit Mittar	695	1.69	
Majority		3,766	9.14	+3.32
Turnout		41,200	53.68	−9.29
BJP gain from INC		Swing	+6.40	

=== 1998 ===
Delhi Assembly elections, 1998: Delhi Cantt
Party	Candidate	Votes	%	±%
INC	Kiran Choudhary	23,445	51.94	+14.91
BJP	Karan Singh Tanwar	20,819	46.12	−13.73
Majority		2,626	5.82	−17.00
Turnout		45,137	44.39	−8.02
INC gain from BJP		Swing	+14.91	

=== 1993 ===
Delhi Assembly elections, 1993: Delhi Cantt
Party	Candidate	Votes	%	±%
BJP	Karan Singh Tanwar	23,260	59.85	
INC	Kiran Chaudhary	14,391	37.03	
BSP	Emanuel Massey	428	1.10	
JD	Jawahar Singh	373	0.96	
Majority		8,869	22.82	
Turnout		38,862	52.41	
BJP win (new seat)				
