= Surinder Singh (commando) =

Indian politician

Honourable Surender Singh Commando

Member of the Delhi Legislative Assembly for Delhi Cantonment
- In office 8 December 2013 – 2020
- Preceded by: Karan Singh Tanwar
- Succeeded by: Virender Singh Kadian

Personal details
- Born: 5th January Haryana
- Party: Bhartiya Janta Party
- Spouse: Mukesh Kumari
- Children: 2
- Military career
- Allegiance: India
- Branch: Indian Army
- Service years: 14 yrs 06 months
- Rank: NK
- Unit: The Grenadiers Regiment
- Conflicts: Kargil War OP Vijay Star; 26/11 2008 Mumbai Terror Attacks OP Black Tornado; Operation North Night Final United Nations DRC Congo; OP Prakaram; OP Satbhawna J&K; OP Ghati J&K; OP Bandipur

Surender Singh is an Indian politician from the Aam Admi Party (AAP), who is a former MLA representing the Delhi Cantonment in the Delhi Legislative Assembly.

== Career ==
Singh was earlier an Indian Army commando, from one of its oldest infantry regiments, The Grenadiers Regiments. He took part in the Kargil War, Operation Parakram, Operation Sadbhavna, Operation Black Tornado and was part of the Operation North Night Final mission in Congo. He was part of NSG Commandos during 2008 Mumbai attacks. He left the army with the rank of Naik (corporal). He was made to run from pillar to post for his pension for 19 months by the ruling Indian govt. He approached AAP party who took up his cause and made sure he got his dues and at the same time he was offered a MLA seat to fight election which he won. In 2012, he did his B.A. from EIILM University, Sikkim. His first name is also written Surinder.

=== Political career ===
Aam Admi party founder member commando Surender Singh was declared for assembly election candidate 26/11/2012 in the 2013 Delhi Legislative Assembly election. Singh was declared the Aam Admi Party candidate for Delhi Cantonment. He won the seat, defeating the incumbent, Karan Singh Tanwar of the Bharatiya Janata Party by 355 votes.

In the 2015 Delhi Legislative Assembly election he was again declared the Aam Admi Party (AAP) candidate for Delhi Cantonment. He won the seat by polling 40133 votes with his nearest rival Karan Singh Tanwar of BJP polling 28935 votes.

In May 2015, Singh was accused of possessing fake bachelor's degree and was served a Delhi High Court notice for the same. On 18 May, Justice Hima Kohli had sought response from Singh on Tanwar's plea that the MLA had "misrepresented himself to be BA in 2012 from Sikkim University... which amounts to corrupt practice within the meaning of the Representation of the People's Act 195". "It is submitted that if he was serving in NSG (Indian Army) till the year 2011, it is beyond comprehension that he would have graduated or undertaken and completed his alleged BA course in the year 2012," Tanwar's petition said. Later met and he met Bhim Sain Bassi verified documents and told him that he gave exams in 2009, 2010 and 2011 and the university came under the scanner in April, 2015. Why should he be blamed for it? An RTI was filed in Sikkim University but he informed he passed from EIILM.
