= Virender Singh Kadian =

Indian politician

Member of the Delhi Legislative Assembly
- Incumbent
- Assumed office 11 February 2020
- Preceded by: Surinder Singh
- Constituency: Delhi Cantt

Municipal Counsel in New Delhi Municipal Council (NDMC) New Delhi

Personal details
- Party: Aam Aadmi Party
- Education: Kurukshetra University
- Website: Official Website

Military service
- Allegiance: India
- Branch/service: Indian Air Force
- Years of service: --
- Rank: Sergeant
- Unit: --

Virendar Singh Kadian is an Indian lawyer and politician. He is a member of the Aam Aadmi Party. He is a member of Eighth Legislative Assembly of Delhi from Delhi Cantt. He worked as Municipal Councillor in New Delhi Municipal Council (NDMC) New Delhi.

== Early life ==
Virender Singh Kadian was born on 4 February 1975 in Dubaldhan (Bidhian) village in District Jhajjar in Haryana. He was born in a middle-class family with army background. He is the eldest son.

His initial education was from Army School Bagdogra (West Bengal), Vaish Public School and Saint Thomas School Rohtak. He graduated from Osmania University Hyderabad with a Post Graduate Degree in Public Administration from Maharshi Dayanand University Rohtak. He holds Bachelor in Laws (LL.B.) from Mumbai university, Master in Law (LL.M.) from Kurukshetra University and Post Graduate Diploma in Legal Drafting from Indian Law Institute, New Delhi.

== Career ==
He served as a sergeant in the Indian Air Force.

He is a social worker and politician. He is a member of the National Council of the Aam Aadmi Party. He is an appointed Member of Rajya Sainik Board of Govt. of NCT of Delhi and Treasurer of Governing Body of Moti Lal Nehru College (Morning and Evening) of Delhi University. He is also engaged as Municipal Counsel in the New Delhi Municipal Council (NDMC).

He is associated with various ex-servicemen associations, working to aid serving and former servicemen and their widows.

He is actively involved in social work and politics.

== Political career ==
He entered the politics with an aim to eradicate corruption from the government and bureaucratic system. He joined the Aam Aadmi Party (AAP) in 2012 as a founder member, serving as a Member of National Council and President AAP Delhi Cantt. Assembly Constituency since 2012. After the resignation of Sajiya Ilmi, he was assigned responsibility as Political Observer of RK Puram Constituency until the 2015 Delhi Assembly election. He contested election of Delhi Cantonment in 2015.

He was elected as a member of the Delhi Legislative Assembly from Delhi Cantt. on 11 February 2020. He was re-elected in 2025 but by a very small margin.

He took on the cases of ex-servicemen around pension and pay anomalies with concerned agencies and got relief for thousands of ex-servicemen and widows.

== Electoral performance ==
=== 2025 ===
Delhi Assembly elections, 2025: Delhi Cantt
Party	Candidate	Votes	%	±%
AAP	Virender Singh Kadian	22,191	46.76	−2.31
BJP	Bhuvan Karan Singh Tanwar	20162	42.48	+11.29
INC	Pradeep Kumar Upmanyu	4252	8.96	−4.19
NOTA	None of the Above	330	0.7	
Majority		2029	4.28	−13.76
Turnout		47458	59.30	+13.82
AAP hold		Swing		

=== 2020 ===
Delhi Assembly elections, 2020: Delhi Cantt
Party	Candidate	Votes	%	±%
AAP	Virender Singh Kadian	28,971	49.17	−2.65
BJP	Manish Singh	18,381	31.19	−6.17
INC	Sandeep Tanwar	7,954	13.15	+4.00
BSP	Nand Kishore Beniwal	1,823	3.09	+2.49
NCP	Surender Singh	908	1.54	
Majority		10,590	18.04	+3.58
Turnout		58,994	45.48	−13.11
AAP hold		Swing	-2.65	

State Legislative Assembly
Preceded by ?	Member of the Delhi Legislative Assembly from Delhi Cantt Assembly constituency 2020–	Incumbent
