= Pankaj Pushkar =

Indian politician

MLA, Sixth Legislative Assembly of Delhi
- In office Feb. 2015 – Feb. 2020
- Preceded by: Harish Khanna
- Succeeded by: Dilip Pandey
- Constituency: Timarpur

Personal details
- Born: 4 May 1972 (age 54) Gajraula
- Party: Aam Aadmi Party
- Spouse: Medha (wife)
- Children: 1 daughter
- Parent: Prem Parkash Pushkar (father)
- Education: Chaudhary Charan Singh University
- Profession: Politician & Teacher

Pankaj Pushkar is an Indian politician and a member of the Sixth Legislative Assembly of Delhi in India. He is a former MLA for the Timarpur constituency of Delhi and is a member of the Aam Aadmi Party.

== Early life and education ==
Pankaj Pushkar was born in Gajraula. He attended the Chaudhary Charan Singh University and attained Master of Arts degree.

== Political career ==
Pankaj Pushkar has been a MLA for one term. He represented the Timarpur constituency and is a member of the Aam Aadmi Party.

On 1 September 2015, he protested against his own party over their neglecting the demands of the people of his constituency on dengue deaths. Pushkar led a march to the Chief Minister of Delhi, Arvind Kejriwal's residence and protested. Pushkar attempted to meet the Chief Minister and hand over a memorandum but was prevented by the police from doing so. He also accused the government of not being sensitive to backward castes.

On 18 October 2015, Pushkar accused the Delhi government of "suppressing" his voice in the Assembly and said there were "permanent barricades" between the ministers and the public in the capital.

== Posts held ==
#	From	To	Position	Comments
01	Feb. 2015	Feb. 2020	Member, Sixth Legislative Assembly of Delhi	

== See also ==
- Aam Aadmi Party
- Delhi Legislative Assembly
- Government of India
- Politics of India
- Sixth Legislative Assembly of Delhi
- Timarpur (Delhi Assembly constituency)
- Uttar Pradesh Legislative Assembly
