= Raj Karan Khatri =

Indian politician

Member of the Delhi Legislative Assembly
- Incumbent
- Assumed office 8 February 2025
- Preceded by: Sharad Kumar Chauhan
- Constituency: Narela

Personal details
- Political party: Bharatiya Janata Party

Raj Karan Khatri is an Indian politician from Bharatiya Janata Party from Delhi. He was elected as a Member of the Legislative Assembly in the 8th Delhi Assembly from Narela Assembly constituency.
