= Tahir Hussain (politician) =

Indian politician and activist

Personal details
- Born: 8 May 1969 (age 57)
- Party: All India Majlis-e-Ittehadul Muslimeen
- Other political affiliations: Aam Aadmi Party
- Occupation: Politician
- Criminal information
- Status: Imprisoned in Tihar Jail
- Convictions: Murder, kidnapping with intent to confine, promoting enmity between different religious groups, rioting, rioting with deadly weapons, unlawful assembly, disobedience to an order duly promulgated by a public servant
- Penalty: Life imprisonment

Tahir Hussain (born 8 May 1969) is a convicted Indian politician known for his role in the Citizenship Amendment Act protests, Delhi riots and the murder of an Intelligence Bureau staffer. He is a former councillor of the Aam Aadmi Party, who was elected from Ward 59 in Nehru Vihar, East Delhi. He was a candidate of All India Majlis-e-Ittehadul Muslimeen (AIMIM), which he joined in December 2024 from Mustafabad Assembly constituency.

== Political career ==
He was born in Uttar Pradesh. He was a member of the Aam Aadmi Party and had served as a councillor in Nehru Vihar.

He joined AIMIM in December 2024. Asaduddin Owaisi posted on Twitter, announcing him as a candidate from Mustafabad Assembly constituency and stating that his family and supporters had joined the party led by Owaisi.

He secured 33,474 votes and finished third.

== Delhi riots case ==
Hussain gained widespread attention for his role in the 2020 Delhi riots. The riots, which resulted in significant loss of life and property, led to accusations of Hussain being a central figure in instigating violence.

An FIR was registered by the Delhi Police against Hussain relating to the Delhi riots on 25 February 2020. Another FIR was registered against Hussain for the murder of Intelligence Bureau staffer Ankit Sharma on 27 February. Two chargeesheets were filed against Hussain in June 2020, with one naming him as the main conspirator in the violence in Chand Bagh and Jaffrabad, and another accusing him of the murder of Ankit Sharma. The Enforcement Directorate on 17 October filed a chargesheet against Hussain, alleging money laundering of Rs. 1.10 crore to instigate the anti-CAA protests and the Delhi riots.

Hussain was convicted along with four others for the murder of Ankit Sharma on 13 July 2026, being found guilty of Sections 302 (murder), 365 (kidnapping or abduction with intent to secretly and wrongfully confine), 153A (promoting enmity between different groups), 147 (rioting), 148 (rioting armed with deadly weapon), 149 (unlawful assembly), and 188 (disobedience to an order duly promulgated by a public servant) of the IPC. He was acquitted of charges under Section 120B (criminal conspiracy) and Section 129. Six other co-accused were acquitted. He was subsequently sentenced to life imprisonment on 31 July 2026 along with four others.

The Karkardooma court stated that Hussain played a pivotal role in instigating the mob that ruthlessly assaulted and killed Sharma before dumping his body in a drain. The 26-year-old Sharma's body was discovered in a nearby drain with 51 stab wounds on his body. The court stated that the convicts were driven by "animus against Hindus". Witnesses alleged that the victim was dragged into Hussain's property during the riots and killed there. Two witnesses informed the court that they had witnessed Hussain delivering inflammatory speeches, claiming Hindus had looted Muslim homes and molested Muslim women, exhorting the mob to "teach these kafirs a lesson". The court stated during the trial that Hussain was not only a conspirator, but also an "active rioter." Hussain's attorney had however countered that he had nothing to do with the crime.
