= Mustafabad Assembly constituency =

Constituency of the Delhi legislative assembly in India

Coordinates: 28.71°N 77.27°E

Mustafabad
- Constituency No. 69 for the Delhi Legislative Assembly

Constituency details
- Country: India
- Region: North India
- State: Delhi
- District: North East Delhi
- Lok Sabha constituency: North East Delhi
- Total electors: 2,63,348
- Reservation: None

Member of Legislative Assembly
- 8th Delhi Legislative Assembly
- Incumbent Mohan Singh Bisht
- Party: BJP
- Elected year: 2025

Mustafabad Assembly constituency is a Vidhan Sabha constituency in Delhi. It is a part of the North East Delhi Lok Sabha constituency. The present geographical structure of Mustafabad constituency came into existence in 2008 as a part of the implementation of the recommendations of the Delimitation Commission of India constituted in 2002.

== Members of the Legislative Assembly ==
Election	Name	Party
2008	Hasan Ahmed	Indian National Congress
2013	Hasan Ahmed	Indian National Congress
2015	Jagdish Pradhan	Bharatiya Janata Party
2020	Haji Yunus	Aam Aadmi Party
2025	Mohan Singh Bisht	Bharatiya Janata Party

== Election results ==
=== 2025 ===
Delhi Assembly elections, 2025: Mustafabad
Party	Candidate	Votes	%	±%
BJP	Mohan Singh Bisht	85,215	42.36	▲0.30
AAP	Adeel Ahmad Khan	67,637	33.62	▼19.58
AIMIM	Tahir Hussain	33,474	16.64	New
INC	Ali Mahndi	11,763	5.85	▲2.96
NOTA	None of the above	455	0.23	−0.02
Majority		17,578	8.74	−2.43
Turnout		201,161		
BJP gain from AAP		Swing		

=== 2020 ===
Delhi Assembly elections, 2020: Mustafabad
Party	Candidate	Votes	%	±%
AAP	Haji Yunus	98,850	53.20	+23.07
BJP	Jagdish Pradhan	78,146	42.06	+6.73
INC	Ali Mahndi	5,355	2.89	−28.79
BSP	Suresh Malkani	1,185	0.65	−1.10
NOTA	None	462	0.25	−0.11
NCP	Mayur Bhan	288	0.16	
Majority		20,704	11.17	+7.52
Turnout		1,85,885	70.75	−0.10
AAP gain from BJP		Swing	+8.17	

=== 2015 ===
Delhi Assembly elections, 2015: Mustafabad
Party	Candidate	Votes	%	±%
BJP	Jagdish Pradhan	58,388	35.33	−1.62
INC	Hasan Ahmed	52,357	31.68	−6.56
AAP	Haji Yunus	49,791	30.13	+16.70
BSP	Neeru Chaudhary	2,893	1.75	−0.26
NOTA	None	587	0.36	
Majority		6,031	3.65	+2.36
Turnout		1,65,388	70.85	
BJP gain from INC		Swing	-1.62	

=== 2013 ===
Delhi Assembly elections, 2013: Mustafabad
Party	Candidate	Votes	%	±%
INC	Hasan Ahmed	56,250	38.24	−2.46
BJP	Jagdish Pradhan	54,354	36.95	−2.74
AAP	Kapil Kumar Dhama	19,759	13.43	
PECP	Master Sher Khan	9478	6.44	
BSP	Naaz Mohammad Khan	2,954	2.01	−12.40
NOTA	None	768	0.52	
Majority		1,896	1.29	+0.28
Turnout		147,097	71.76	
INC hold		Swing	-2.46	

=== 2008 ===
Delhi Assembly elections, 2008: Mustafabad
Party	Candidate	Votes	%	±%
INC	Hasan Ahmed	39,838	40.70	
BJP	Yogender Kumar Sharma	38,859	39.69	
BSP	Sher Khan Malik	14,108	14.41	
Independent	Md Rahis	989	1.01	
Majority		979	1.01	
Turnout		97,894	58.0	
INC win (new seat)				
