= Institute of Nuclear Medicine & Allied Sciences =

Indian defense laboratory

- Established: 1961
- Director: Dr. Sudhir Chandana
- Location: Timarpur, Delhi
- Operating agency: DRDO
- Website: INMAS Home Page

Institute of Nuclear Medicine & Allied Sciences (INMAS) is a laboratory of the Defence Research and Development Organisation (DRDO). Located in Timarpur, Delhi, it is involved in nuclear medicine research and responding to nuclear accidents and explosions. The department of nuclear medicine under the institute offers a two-year diploma in radiation medicine since 1968, making it the first formal training program in nuclear medicine in the world.

== History ==
A Radiation Cell was established in 1956 at the Defence Science Laboratory in Delhi, which is the origin of the institute, which can be traced back to this year. As part of the initial assignment, a study was to be conducted on the consequences of the use of nuclear weapons and other weapons of mass destruction as well. In 1959, the radiology cell was upgraded to the Radiation Medicine Division, and in 1961, the Institute of Nuclear Medicine and Allied Sciences was established.
