= Raj Kumar Bhatia =

Indian politician

Member of the Delhi Legislative Assembly
- Incumbent
- Assumed office 8 February 2025
- Preceded by: Pawan Kumar Sharma
- Constituency: Adarsh Nagar

Personal details
- Political party: Bharatiya Janata Party

Raj Kumar Bhatia is an Indian politician from Bharatiya Janata Party from Delhi. He was elected as a Member of the Legislative Assembly to the 8th Delhi Assembly from Adarsh Nagar Assembly constituency, defeating his closest competitor Mukesh Kumar Goel of Aam Aadmi Party by 11,482 votes.
