= Hasan Ahmed (politician) =

Indian politician belonging to INC

Hasan Ahmed हसन अहमद

Member of the Delhi Legislative Assembly (MLA) for Mustafabad
- In office Oct. 2008 – Feb. 2015
- Preceded by: Yogender Kumar Sharma
- Succeeded by: Jagdish Pradhan

Personal details
- Party: Indian National Congress

Hasan Ahmed is an Indian politician from Indian National Congress. He was twice elected from Mustafabad (Delhi Assembly) constituency in 2008 and 2013. He lost to Jagdish Pradhan in 2015.

== Political career ==
Hasan Ahmed was elected to the 4th Delhi Assembly in 2008, defeating Yogender Kumar Sharma (BJP) by 983 votes. In 2013, he was elected again for the 5th Delhi Assembly by defeating Jagdish Pradhan (BJP) by 1,896 votes.

== Position held ==
Year	Description
2008	Elected to 4th Delhi Assembly: Member, Committee on Government Assurance (2009–2010); Member, Committee on Petition (2009–2010)
2013	Elected to 5th Delhi Assembly (2nd term)

== Elections contested ==
=== Delhi Legislative Assembly ===
Year	Constituency	Result	Vote percentage	Opposition Candidate	Opposition Party	Opposition vote percentage	Ref
1993	Okhla	Lost	27.87%	Parvez Hashmi	JD	30.91%	
2003	Karawal Nagar	Lost	27.98%	Mohan Singh Bisht	BJP	42.35%	
2008	Mustafabad	Won	40.70%	Yogender Kumar Sharma	BJP	39.69%	
2013	Mustafabad	Won	38.24%	Jagdish Pradhan	BJP	36.95%	
2015	Mustafabad	Lost	31.68%	Jagdish Pradhan	BJP	35.33%	

== Attack on Hasan Ahmed during Press Conference at Lucknow ==
Once Hasan Ahmed went to attend a press conference in Lucknow. Suddenly 15-20 youths entered the hotel premises, where Hasan Ahmed was attending press conference and he was allegedly attacked by that group of youths. Later on, one of the attackers who was named Naqi said he is here to talk against Kalbe Jawwad (s Shia cleric), that is why we attacked him. Hasan Ahmed filed a FIR against all of them after the whole incident.
