= Haji Yunus =

Indian politician

Member of the Delhi Legislative Assembly
- In office 12 February 2020 – 8 February 2025
- Preceded by: Jagdish Pradhan
- Succeeded by: Mohan Singh Bisht
- Constituency: Mustafabad

Personal details
- Born: Delhi, India
- Party: Aam Admi Party
- Parent: Sh. Abdul Samad (father)
- Education: Darul Uloom Deoband
- Profession: Politician, businessperson
- Religion: Islam

Haji Yunus is an Indian politician and a former member of the Legislative Assembly of Delhi in India. He represented the Mustafabad constituency of New Delhi from 2020 to 2025 and is a member of the Aam Admi Party political party.

== Member of Legislative Assembly (2020 - 2025) ==
From 2020-2025, he was an elected member of the 7th Delhi Assembly.

Committee assignments of Delhi Legislative Assembly

- Member (2022-2023), Committee on Estimates

== Electoral performance ==
Delhi Assembly elections, 2020: Mustafabad
Party	Candidate	Votes	%	±%
AAP	Haji Yunus	98,850	53.20	+23.07
BJP	Jagdish Pradhan	78,146	42.06	+6.73
INC	Ali Mahndi	5,355	2.89	−28.79
BSP	Suresh Malkani	1,185	0.65	−1.10
NOTA	None	462	0.25	−0.11
NCP	Mayur Bhan	288	0.16	
Majority		20,704	11.17	+7.52
Turnout		1,85,885	70.75	−0.10
AAP gain from BJP		Swing	+8.17	

== See also ==
- List of Deobandis

State Legislative Assembly
Preceded by ?	Member of the Delhi Legislative Assembly from Mustafabad Assembly constituency 2020– 2025	Succeeded by Mohan Singh Bisht
