= Narela, Delhi Assembly constituency =

Legislative assembly seat in Delhi

Coordinates: 28.85°N 77.09°E

Narela
- Constituency No. 1 for the

Constituency details
- Country: India
- District: North Delhi
- Lok Sabha constituency: North West Delhi
- Reservation: None

Member of Legislative Assembly
- Incumbent Raj Karan Khatri
- Party: BJP
- Elected year: 2025

Nerela Assembly constituency, also known as Narela, is a Vidhan Sabha constituency in the National Capital Territory of Delhi. It is a part of the North West Delhi Lok Sabha constituency.

== Overview ==
From 1993 to 2008, it was Delhi Legislative Assembly segment within the East Delhi Lok Sabha constituency, prior to it, Nerela remained from 1966–93, a Delhi Metropolitan Council segment, with the same constituency. After the delimitation of 2008, Nerela (Narela) is now an Assembly segment within the North West Delhi Lok Sabha constituency.

== Members of Legislative Assembly ==
Year	Name	Party
1952	Mange Ram Rana	Indian National Congress
1972	Heera Singh Rana	Indian National Congress
1977	Shanti Swaroop	Janta Party (JNP)
1983	Hariram Khatri	Lok Dal (LKD)
1993	Indraj Singh	Bharatiya Janata Party
1998	Charan Singh Kandera	Indian National Congress
2003	Charan Singh Kandera	Indian National Congress
2008	Jaswant Singh Rana	Indian National Congress
2013	Neeldaman Khatri	Bharatiya Janata Party
2015	Sharad Kumar Chauhan	Aam Aadmi Party
2020	Sharad Kumar Chauhan	Aam Aadmi Party
2025	Raj Karan Khatri	Bharatiya Janata Party

== Election results ==
=== 2025 ===
Delhi Assembly elections, 2025: Narela
Party	Candidate	Votes	%	±%
BJP	Raj Karan Khatri	87,215	50.20	▲8.66
AAP	Sharad Chauhan	78,619	45.26	▼6.8
INC	Aruna Kumari	6,782	3.9	▲0.12
ASP(KR)	Mohd Khalid	278	0.16	▲0.16
NOTA	None of the above	981	0.56	▲0.11
Majority		8,596	4.94	
Turnout		173,703	61.85	−3.49
BJP gain from AAP		Swing		

=== 2020 ===
Delhi Assembly elections, 2020: Narela
Party	Candidate	Votes	%	±%
AAP	Sharad Chauhan	86,262	52.06	−7.91
BJP	Neel Daman Khatri	68,833	41.54	+6.70
INC	Siddharth Kundu	6,270	3.78	+0.88
BSP	Mahendar Choudhary	821	0.50	−0.54
NOTA	None of the above	753	0.45	−0.03
Majority		17,429	10.52	−14.61
Turnout		1,65,963	65.34	−1.17
AAP hold		Swing	−7.91	

=== 2015 ===
Delhi Assembly elections, 2015: Narela
Party	Candidate	Votes	%	±%
AAP	Sharad Chauhan	96,143	59.97	+43.26
BJP	Neel Daman Khatri	55,851	34.84	−3.11
INC	Praveen Kumar Bhugra	4,643	2.90	−15.38
BSP	Roopesh Bhardwaj	1,662	1.04	−20.55
NOTA	None of the Above	767	0.48	−0.17
Majority		40,292	25.13	+8.77
Turnout		1,60,339	66.52	−1.39
AAP gain from BJP		Swing	+23.19	

=== 2013 ===
Delhi Assembly elections, 2013: Narela
Party	Candidate	Votes	%	±%
BJP	Neel Daman Khatri	54,622	37.95	+10.78
BSP	Virender Singh Mann	31,077	21.59	−9.31
INC	Jaswant Singh	26,311	18.28	−13.38
AAP	Baljit Singh Mann	24,031	16.70	
Independent	Ram Gopal Sharma	3,426	2.38	
CPI	Sanjeev Kumar Rana	643	0.45	
Independent	Ajay Mudgil	633	0.44	
JD(U)	Mohd Yaqub Siddiqui	520	0.36	
INLD	Ajit Singh	481	0.33	
CPI(ML)L	Rohtash Kumar	338	0.23	−0.58
SP	Ajay Kumar	285	0.20	−0.24
LJP	Satish	266	0.18	
ASP	Pravesh	210	0.15	
PECP	Shamim	163	0.11	
NOTA	None of the Above	931	0.65	
Majority		23,545	16.36	+15.60
Turnout		1,44,440	68.15	
BJP gain from INC		Swing	+12.08	

=== 2008 ===
Delhi Assembly elections, 2008: Nerela
Party	Candidate	Votes	%	±%
INC	Jaswant Singh	34,662	31.66	
BSP	Sharad Chauhan	33,830	30.90	
BJP	Ajit Singh	29,754	27.17	
Independent	Raj Singh Khatri	5,041	4.60	
LJP	Amit Kumar	1,704	1.56	
Majority		832	0.76	
Turnout		1,09,494	56.80	
INC win (new seat)				

=== 2003 ===
2003 Delhi Legislative Assembly: Narela
Party	Candidate	Votes	%	±%
INC	Charan Singh Kandera	36501	48.40	+10.77
BJP	Laxman Singh	28698	38.06	+5.53
BSP	Ram Phool Jatav	8018	10.63	+6.74
Independent	Rajender Lahari	594	0.79	N/A
RLD	Kailashwati	428	0.57	N/A
INLD	Jawahar Chand	383	0.51	N/A
CPI(ML)L	Ram Kumar	373	0.49	N/A
IJP	Ramu	251	0.33	N/A
Independent	Babu Ram	162	0.21	N/A
Majority		36501	10.34	+5.24
Turnout		75433	57.63	+2.12
INC hold		Swing	+10.77%	
