= Rajni Abbi =

Indian politician and academic

Rajni Abbi (born 1962) is an Indian Politician, a leader of Bharatiya Janata Party and a law professor. She was the mayor of Delhi from 2011 to 2012. She is serving as a proctor at Delhi University.

== Personal life and education ==
She was born in 1962 and did her graduation in English literature from Miranda House College. Later she pursued her legal education from Faculty of Law, Delhi University, and was a gold medalist both in LL.B. and LL.M. She completed her Ph.D. in law from Delhi University and has been teaching there since then.
