= Jagdish Pradhan =

Indian politician (born 1953)

Member of Delhi Legislative Assembly
- In office 23 February 2015 – 24 February 2020
- Preceded by: Hasan Ahmed
- Succeeded by: Haji Yunus
- Constituency: Mustafabad

Personal details
- Born: 4 July 1953 (age 73) New Delhi, India
- Party: Bharatiya Janata Party
- Education: Loni Inter College
- Profession: Politician, businessperson

Jagdish Pradhan is an Indian politician and a former member of the Sixth Legislative Assembly of Delhi. He represented the Mustafabad constituency of New Delhi as a member of the Bharatiya Janata Party.

== Early life and education ==
Jagdish Pradhan was born in New Delhi. He attended the Loni Inter College and has a tenth grade level of education.

== Political career ==
Jagdish Pradhan was an MLA for one term. He represented the Mustafabad constituency as a BJP member.

== Posts held ==
#	From	To	Position	Comments
01	Feb 2015	Feb 2020	Member, Sixth Legislative Assembly of Delhi	

== See also ==
- Bhartiya Janata Party
- Delhi Legislative Assembly
- Government of India
- Mustafabad (Delhi Assembly constituency)
- Politics of India
- Sixth Legislative Assembly of Delhi
