= Harish Khanna (politician) =

Indian politician

Harish Khanna is an Indian politician affiliated with the Aam Aadmi Party. In the 2013 Delhi Legislative Assembly election, he was elected as an MLA from Timarpur constituency in Delhi as an AAP member.
