= Hassan Ahmed (Ghanaian diplomat) =

Ghanaian diplomat

Head of Protocol, Flagstaff House
- President: Nana Akuffo Addo

Personal details
- Born: 1955 (age 70–71) Ghana
- Party: New Patriotic Party
- Children: 4
- Education: Georgetown School of Foreign Affairs
- Occupation: Diplomat

Hassan Ahmed (born 1955) is a Ghanaian diplomat. He has served as Ghana's ambassador to several countries including Iran, Japan and Cuba. He was Head of Office of the UN-AU Hybrid office in Sudan. He is the current Director of Protocol for Nana Akufo-Addo, President of Ghana.

== Working life ==
Hassan Ahmed graduated with a Master's degree from the Georgetown School of Foreign Service. Much of his working life has been spent as a career diplomat. He was employed at the Ministry of Foreign Affairs of Ghana and worked there for 34 years. He spent time in many countries including Saudi Arabia, Denmark, and Cuba. He was appointed Deputy Chief of Ghana's diplomatic mission in Japan. When President Akuffo-Addo served as Minister of Foreign Affairs under the John Agyekum Kufuor administration, Ahmed was the Chief of Protocol at the Ministry of Foreign Affairs. His last diplomatic posting was to the Islamic Republic of Iran. He served as Ghana Ambassador from 2008 to 2012. After retiring from the Ministry of Foreign of Affairs, he took up an international appointment with the United Nations in 2013. The position was with the United Nations-African Union Hybrid Operation in Darfur, Khartoum, Sudan, where he was appointed the Head of Office.

== Director of Protocol ==
Hassan Ahmed resigned from his UN position when President Akuffo-Addo appointed him to the position of Head of Protocol at The Flagstaff House. His appointment by the president was well received as many believed that the team that the president had assembled were people of integrity who would help the president to execute his agenda. As Director of State Protocol, Ahmed has the task of arranging all schedules of visits by the President as well as welcoming dignitaries to the presidency. One of such receptions was given to the Chinese Ambassador to Ghana, Her Excellency Sun Baohong, who paid a courtesy call on Ahmed to exchange ideas on how to improve the bilateral relationship between the two countries. He also accompanies the president on overseas trips.

== Personal life ==
Hassan Ahmed is a Muslim and is married and has three children.

Political offices
Preceded by	Director of Protocol; 2017 -	Incumbent
