= Neeldaman Khatri =

Indian politician

Neeldaman Khatri (born 2 May 1970) is an Indian Politician and a leader of Bharatiya Janata Party. He was elected to Delhi Legislative Assembly from Nerela constituency in Fifth Delhi Assembly. He was born in 1970 in Narela, Delhi and his wife Keshrani Neeldaman Khatri became MCD councilor in 2012.
