= Narender Nath =

Indian politician

Narender Nath is a member of the Indian National Congress party, has been a member of the Indian Legislative Assembly for the Assembly Constituency Shahdara.

He was born 09-08-1945 in Delhi, and is a Medical Graduate working as a physician.

He has been active in Politics since 1971. He was General Secretary, Shahdara Block Congress Committee up to 1977, Member, Metropolitan Council during 1983–1990, Executive Member D.P.C.C during 1990–1994, and Leader of Opposition in M.C.D in 1997–1998, Vice-president D.P.C.C during 1995–2004. He was elected M.L.A in the Second Delhi Legislative Assembly in 1998, Was Minister of Education Technical Education Power Tourism and Languages, Govt. of Delhi during second Assembly. Re -elected M.L.A for the Third Legislative Assembly in December 2003 and in the Fourth Legislative Assembly 2008.
