= Sanjay Goyal =

Indian Administrative Service Officer

- Official Portrait

Commissioner and Secretary, Government of Meghalaya
- Appointed by: President of India

Personal details
- Born: 5 May 1977 (age 49) Kheri District, Uttar Pradesh, India
- Spouse: Shradha Goyal (m. 2005)
- Children: 2
- Education: B.Sc (Chemistry), Delhi University L.L.B, Delhi University L.L.M, Babu Banarasi Das University
- Occupation: IAS officer, Civil Servant, Bureaucrat

Sanjay Goyal is an Indian Administrative Service Officer of 2004 batch from the Assam Meghalaya cadre who currently serves as Commissioner and Secretary in Government of Meghalaya. He is also the Chairman cum Managing Director of Meghalaya Energy Corporation Ltd (MeECL), Chairperson, Meghalaya Board of Revenue, and Resident Commissioner of Meghalaya House at New Delhi.

Sanjay cleared the Union Public Service Commission Civil Services Examination in 2003, with an All India Rank 32.

Postings Held	From	To
Sub Divisional Officer, Ampati Civil Sub Division (now South West Garo Hills District)	2006	2008
District Magistrate & Collector, Jaintia Hills District, Jowai	2008	2009
District Magistrate & Collector, West Garo Hills District, Tura	2009	2012
District Magistrate & Collector, East Khasi Hills District, Shillong	2012	2015
Secretary to Chief Minister, Finance, ERTS, State Pay Commission and MD, MCCL	2015	2017
Inter Cadre Deputation to Uttar Pradesh	2017	2022
Commissioner & Secretary, Government of Meghalaya	2022	Present

In September 2017, Sanjay was relieved from Assam-Meghalaya cadre for an initial period of 3 years (later on given an extension of 2 years), enabling him to go on inter-state deputation to his home cadre, Uttar Pradesh. In Uttar Pradesh, he served as Special Secretary Finance, Managing Director of Madhyanchal Vidyut Vitran Nigam Ltd (an undertaking of Uttar Pradesh Power Corporation Limited), Relief Commissioner and Revenue Secretary, Basic Education Secretary, Divisional Commissioner of Prayagraj Division and Divisional Commissioner of Jhansi Division up till September 2022, after which he was repatriated to his parent cadre.

In April 2021, he was empaneled to hold Joint Secretary/equivalent rank in the Government of India.
