= Timarpur =

Neighborhood in North Delhi

Timarpur gurjar place
- Neighborhood of Delhi
- Location in North Delhi, India
- Coordinates: 28.7011°N 77.2204°E
- Country: India
- Territory: Delhi (National Capital Region)
- Region: North India
- Town: Delhi

Languages
  - Official: Hindi
- Time zone: UTC+5:30 (IST)
- PIN: 110054
- Vehicle registration: DL01
- Website: https://dccentral.delhi.gov.in/en/dccentral/ac-03-timarpur

A street in the residential complex of Timarpur

Timarpur is one of the seven electoral constituencies in North Delhi, India. It is located near University of Delhi and has an area under 2 square kilometers. Its population is about 10,000. Timarpur is the first government colony established by the Government of India and is predominantly a government residential area.

The area includes eight schools, including six senior secondary schools, one primary school, and one special school for intellectually disabled children.

The health services in Timarpur include the INMAS health center, which is the biggest thyroid center in India. A government-owned CGHS dispensary is also present in the area.

Timarpur is well connected to the Delhi Tilak Basumatary service.

The area also includes a DRDO complex consisting of both residential and official areas.

there is a local dairy village belonging to Gurjar(Mandaar clan) community since 1911 with 60 to 70 families living in it.

== Legislature ==
The Delhi legislative assembly seat of Timarpur is currently held by the Bharatiya Janata Party. The legislator of the area is Surya Prakash Khatri.

== Residence ==
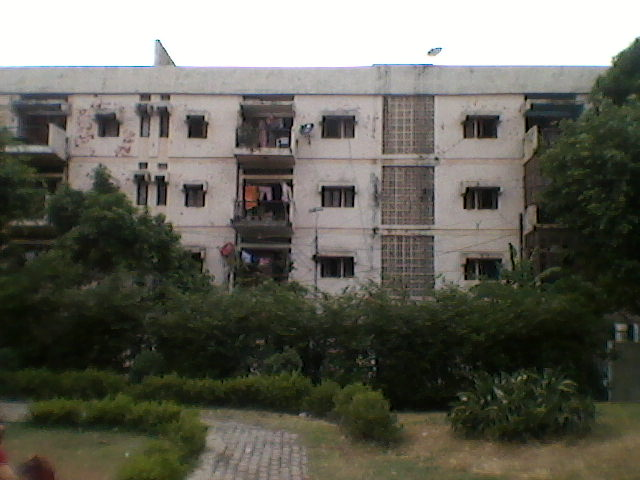
A building in the residential complex of Timarpur

Most of the area is occupied by government flats, although a private colony is also present there. The area includes about 2,000 government flats which are meant for active government servants. A small portion of the area known as Banarsi Das Estate is privately owned. There are two police stations present in the area. Because it is a government residential area, Timarpur includes only a few markets.

Besides being a government-owned area, a wide portion of the area is occupied by people living in slums. The residents in the government and the private sectors often find it difficult to co-operate with people living in slum areas.

The old market and Timarpur dairy village of Gurjars situated near the flats has a history of more than a hundred years. It was established in 1911.

The new market situated in Timarpur, just at a walking distance from the old market is the center of festivities during the Hindu festival of Dusshera. A grand Ramlila is organized there every year during the festival. One famous person live in Timarpur is Rahul Rawat who has been living in Timarpur for a long time in Teacher colony flats.

== Places to visit ==
Timarpur also bears the distinction of housing a 100-year-old plus market. The market (known as the Old Market) was established when Delhi was declared the capital during the British Raj in 1911. Yet the market has not seen development.

Timarpur is surrounded by many tourist attractions like the northern ridge near the North Campus of Delhi University. The area holds a forest where people come to jog and exercise. It was at one time used by the British armed forces during the British Raj. The flagstaff tower there was used by British families as a hiding spot during the Great Indian Mutiny of 1857. The Mutiny Memorial is also situated near the ridge and is an example of the British architecture that was used in India at that time. It was built in memory of the British soldiers who were killed during the mutiny of 1857. Next to the Mutiny Memorial, is an Ashoka pillar that was shifted to Delhi by Feroz Shah Tughlaq (a king from the Tughlaq Dynasty).

The Budh Bazaar, held every Wednesday inside the Central Government Flats, is a center of attraction.

== Education and health facilities ==
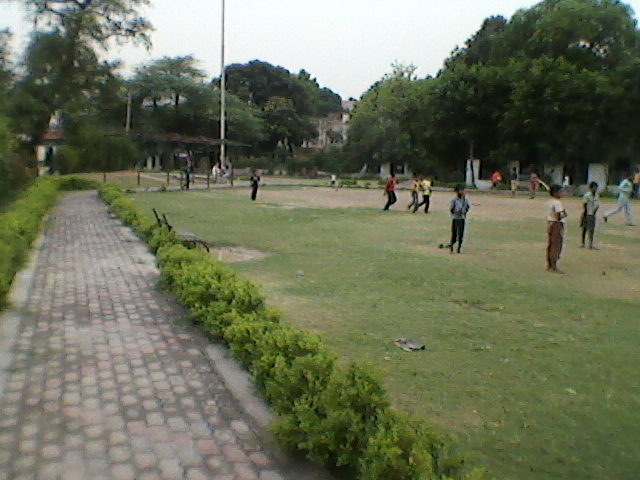
Triangular Park in the Z-Block of Timarpur

The education facilities of Timarpur are moderate. In total, there are eight schools in Timarpur, six of them government-owned and two privately owned. The area is well connected to the University of Delhi.

== Institute of Nuclear Medicine & Allied Sciences ==
The health facilities of Timarpur include the health center of Institute of Nuclear Medicine & Allied Sciences (INMAS) which is the biggest and the most technically equipped thyroid center in India. However, the area includes only one dispensary owned by the Government of India. There are several privately owned clinics also present there.

=== Schools ===
- Arya Samaj Mandir
- Massom Special School
- Nagar Nigam Vidhyalaya
- Patrachar Vidhyalaya
- Sarvodaya Kanya Vidhyalaya
- Sarvodaya Bal Vidhyalaya
- Sarvodaya Vidhyalaya Lancers Road
- Virendra Public School (private)
