= Karan Singh Tanwar =

Indian politician

Karan Singh Tanwar is an Indian politician, Bharatiya Janata Party leader and former member of the Delhi Legislative Assembly. He was jailed during The Emergency in 1975–77 for 19 months. He was a Vice Chairman of New Delhi Municipal Council.
