= Ram Kishan Singhal =

Indian politician

Ram Kishan Singhal is an Indian politician, Bharatiya Janata Party leader and a former member of the Delhi Legislative Assembly. He was born in 1951 in Karnal in Haryana and has been a member of Municipal Corporation of Delhi.
