= 2020 Delhi Legislative Assembly election =

2020 state assembly election in Delhi

- 8 February 2020

All 70 seats in the Delhi Legislative Assembly 36 seats needed for a majority
- Opinion polls
- Turnout: 62.82% (▼4.65%)
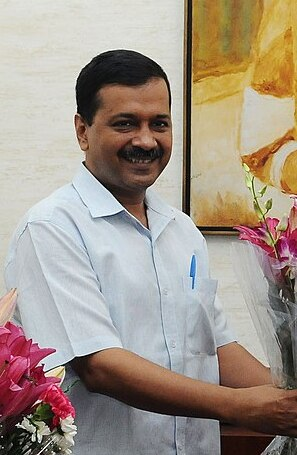

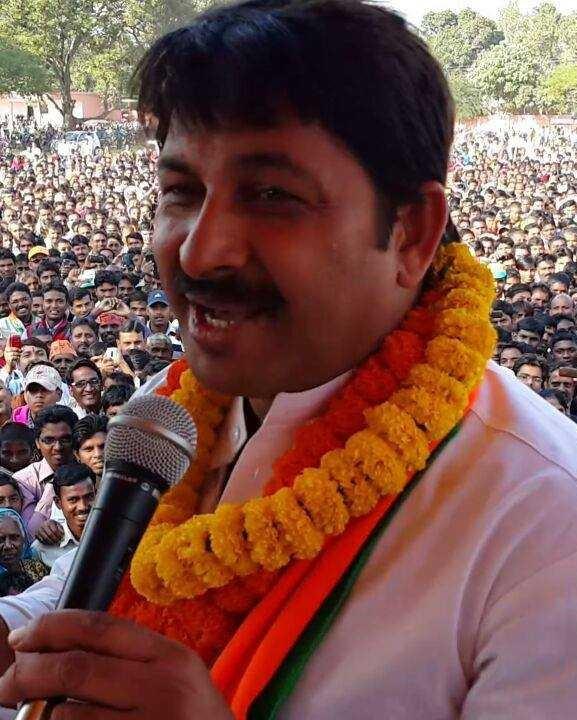
	Majority party	Minority party
Leader	Arvind Kejriwal	Manoj Tiwari
Party	AAP	BJP
Leader's seat	New Delhi	Did not contest
Last election	67	3
Seats won	62	8
Seat change	▼5	▲5
Popular vote	4,974,592	3,692,552
Percentage	53.57%	39.77%
Swing	▼0.71	▲6.57%

- Structure of the Delhi Legislative Assembly after the election
Chief Minister before election
Arvind Kejriwal
AAP
Elected Chief Minister
Arvind Kejriwal
AAP

Legislative Assembly elections were held in Delhi on 8 February 2020 to elect 70 members of the Delhi Legislative Assembly. Voters turnout was recorded at 62.82%, a decline of 4.65% from the previous assembly election in Delhi but 2.2% more than the 2019 Indian general election in Delhi. The term of the assembly elected in 2015 expired on 22 February 2020. The Aam Aadmi Party, led by Arvind Kejriwal won 62 seats to claim an absolute majority in the elections.

== Background ==
The previous Assembly elections were held in February 2015. After the election, the Aam Aadmi Party formed the state government, with Arvind Kejriwal becoming Chief Minister.

== Schedule ==
The election schedule was announced by the Election Commission of India on 6 January 2020 at 3:35 PM IST.

Poll event	Schedule
Notification date	14 January 2020
Last date for filing nomination	21 January 2020
Scrutiny of nomination	22 January 2020
Last date for withdrawal of nomination	24 January 2020
Date of poll	8 February 2020
Date of counting of Votes	11 February 2020

== Parties and alliances ==
Aam Aadmi Party
Party	Flag	Symbol	Leader	Seats
Aam Aadmi Party			Arvind Kejriwal	70

National Democratic Alliance
Party	Flag	Symbol	Leader	Seats
Bharatiya Janata Party			Manoj Tiwari	67
Janata Dal (United)			Shailendra Kumar	2
Lok Janshakti Party			Sant Lal	1 + 4
Total				70

United Progressive Alliance
Party	Flag	Symbol	Leader	Seats
Indian National Congress			Subhash Chopra	66
Rashtriya Janata Dal			Pramod Tyagi	4
Total				70

== List of Candidates ==
List Of Candidates
Constituency		AAP		NDA+		UPA	
No.	Name	Party	Candidate	Party	Candidate	Party	Candidate
1	Narela	AAP	Sharad Chauhan	BJP	Neeldaman Khatri	INC	Siddharth Kundu
2	Burari	AAP	Sanjeev Jha	JD(U)	Shailendra Kumar	RJD	Pramod Tyagi
3	Timarpur	AAP	Dilip Pandey	BJP	Surinder Pal Singh (Bittoo)	INC	Amar Lata Sangwan
4	Adarsh Nagar	AAP	Pawan Kumar Sharma	BJP	Raj Kumar Bhatia	INC	Mukesh Kumar Goel
5	Badli	AAP	Ajesh Yadav	BJP	Vijay Kumar Bhagat	INC	Devender Yadav
6	Rithala	AAP	Mohinder Goyal	BJP	Manish Chaudhary	INC	Pradeep Kumar Pandey
7	Bawana (SC)	AAP	Jai Bhagwan	BJP	Ravinder Kumar	INC	Surender Kumar
8	Mundka	AAP	Dharampal Lakra	BJP	Azad Singh	INC	Naresh Kumar
9	Kirari	AAP	Rituraj Govind	BJP	Anil Jha Vats	RJD	Md Riyazuddin Khan
10	Sultanpur Majra (SC)	AAP	Mukesh Kumar Ahlawat	BJP	Ram Chander Chawriya	INC	Jai Kishan
11	Nangloi Jat	AAP	Raghuvinder Shokeen	BJP	Suman Lata	INC	Mandeep Singh
12	Mangol Puri (SC)	AAP	Rakhi Birla	BJP	Karam Singh Karma	INC	Rajesh Lilothia
13	Rohini	AAP	Rajesh Nama Bansiwala	BJP	Vijender Gupta	INC	Sumesh Gupta
14	Shalimar Bagh	AAP	Bandana Kumari	BJP	Rekha Gupta	INC	J S Nayol
15	Shakur Basti	AAP	Satyendra Kumar Jain	BJP	S. C. Vats	INC	Dev Raj Arora
16	Tri Nagar	AAP	Preeti Tomar	BJP	Tilak Ram Gupta	INC	Kamal Kant Sharma
17	Wazirpur	AAP	Rajesh Gupta	BJP	Mahander Nagpal	INC	Harikishan Jindal
18	Model Town	AAP	Akhilesh Pati Tripathi	BJP	Kapil Mishra	INC	Akanksha Ola
19	Sadar Bazar	AAP	Som Dutt	BJP	Jai Parkash	INC	Satbir Sharma
20	Chandni Chowk	AAP	Parlad Singh Sawhney	BJP	Suman Kumar Gupta	INC	Alka Lamba
21	Matia Mahal	AAP	Shoaib Iqbal	BJP	Ravinder Gupta	INC	Mirza Javed Ali
22	Ballimaran	AAP	Imran Hussain	BJP	Lata	INC	Haroon Yusuf
23	Karol Bagh (SC)	AAP	Vishesh Ravi	BJP	Yogender Chandoliya	INC	Gourav Kumar
24	Patel Nagar (SC)	AAP	Raaj Kumar Anand	BJP	Pravesh Ratn	INC	Krishna Tirath
25	Moti Nagar	AAP	Shiv Charan Goel	BJP	Subhash Sachdeva	INC	Ramesh Popli
26	Madipur (SC)	AAP	Girish Soni	BJP	Kailash Gangwal	INC	Jai Prakash Panwar
27	Rajouri Garden	AAP	Dhanwati Chandela	BJP	Ramesh Khanna	INC	Amandeep Singh Sudan
28	Hari Nagar	AAP	Raj Kumari Dhillon	BJP	Tajinder Pal Singh Bagga	INC	Surinder Kumar Setia
29	Tilak Nagar	AAP	Jarnail Singh	BJP	Rajiv Babbar	INC	Raminder Singh
30	Janakpuri	AAP	Rajesh Rishi	BJP	Ashish Sood	INC	Radhika Khera
31	Vikaspuri	AAP	Mahinder Yadav	BJP	Sanjay Singh	INC	Mukesh Sharma
32	Uttam Nagar	AAP	Naresh Balyan	BJP	Krishan Gahlot	RJD	Shakti Kumar Bishnoi
33	Dwarka	AAP	Vinay Mishra	BJP	Parduymn Rajput	INC	Adarsh Shastri
34	Matiala	AAP	Gulab Singh Yadav	BJP	Rajesh Gahlot	INC	Sumesh Shokeen
35	Najafgarh	AAP	Kailash Gahlot	BJP	Ajeet Singh Kharkhari	INC	Sahab Singh
36	Bijwasan	AAP	Bhupinder Singh Joon	BJP	Sat Prakash Rana	INC	Parveen Rana
37	Palam	AAP	Bhavna Gaur	BJP	Vijay Pandit	RJD	Nirmal Kumar Singh
38	Delhi Cantt	AAP	Virender Singh Kadian	BJP	Manish Singh	INC	Sandeep Tanwar
39	Rajinder Nagar	AAP	Raghav Chadha	BJP	R. P. Singh	INC	Rocky Tuseed
40	New Delhi	AAP	Arvind Kejriwal	BJP	Sunil Kumar Yadav	INC	Romesh Sabharwal
41	Jangpura	AAP	Praveen Kumar	BJP	Impreet Singh Bakshi	INC	Tarvinder Singh Marwah
42	Kasturba Nagar	AAP	Madan Lal	BJP	Ravinder Choudhry	INC	Abhishek Dutt
43	Malviya Nagar	AAP	Somnath Bharti	BJP	Shailender Singh	INC	Neetu Verma Soin
44	R K Puram	AAP	Parmila Tokas	BJP	Anil Kumar Sharma	INC	Priyanka Singh
45	Mehrauli	AAP	Naresh Yadav	BJP	Kusum Khatri	INC	A. A. Mahender Chaudhary
46	Chhatarpur	AAP	Kartar Singh Tanwar	BJP	Brahm Singh Tanwar	INC	Satish Lohia
47	Deoli (SC)	AAP	Prakash Jarwal	BJP	Arvind Kumar	INC	Arvinder Singh Lovely
48	Ambedkar Nagar (SC)	AAP	Ajay Dutt	BJP	Khushiram Chunar	INC	Yaduraj Choudhary
49	Sangam Vihar	AAP	Dinesh Mohaniya	JD(U)	Shiv Charan Lal Gupta	INC	Poonam Azad
50	Greater Kailash	AAP	Saurabh Bhardwaj	BJP	Shikha Roy	INC	Sukhbir Singh Panwar
51	Kalkaji	AAP	Atishi Marlena	BJP	Dharambir Singh	INC	Shivani Chopra
52	Tughlakabad	AAP	Sahi Ram	BJP	Vikram Bidhuri	INC	Shubham Sharma
53	Badarpur	AAP	Ram Singh Netaji	BJP	Ramvir Singh Bidhuri	INC	Pramod Kumar Yadav
54	Okhla	AAP	Amanatullah Khan	BJP	Braham Singh	INC	Parvez Hashmi
55	Trilokpuri (SC)	AAP	Rohit Kumar Mehraulia	BJP	Kiran Vaidya	INC	Vijay Kumar
56	Kondli (SC)	AAP	Kuldeep Kumar	BJP	Raj Kumar	INC	Amrish Singh Gautam
57	Patparganj	AAP	Manish Sisodia	BJP	Ravinder Singh Negi	INC	Laxman Rawat
58	Laxmi Nagar	AAP	Nitin Tyagi	BJP	Abhay Verma	INC	Hari Dutt Sharma
59	Vishwas Nagar	AAP	Deepak Singla	BJP	Om Prakash Sharma	INC	Gurcharan Singh
60	Krishna Nagar	AAP	S. K. Bagga	BJP	Anil Goyal	INC	Ashok Kumar Walia
61	Gandhi Nagar	AAP	Naveen Chaudhary	BJP	Anil Kumar Bajpai	INC	Arvinder Singh Lovely
62	Shahdara	AAP	Ram Niwas Goel	BJP	Sanjay Goyal	INC	Dr. Narender Nath
63	Seemapuri (SC)	AAP	Rajendra Pal Gautam	LJP	Sant Lal	INC	Veer Singh Dhingan
64	Rohtas Nagar	AAP	Sarita Singh	BJP	Jitender Mahajan	INC	Vipin Sharma
65	Seelampur	AAP	Abdul Rehman	BJP	Kaushal Kumar Mishra	INC	Mateen Ahmed
66	Ghonda	AAP	Shri Dutt Sharma	BJP	Ajay Mahawar	INC	Bhisham Sharma
67	Babarpur	AAP	Gopal Rai	BJP	Naresh Gaur	INC	Anveeksha Jain
68	Gokalpur (SC)	AAP	Surendra Kumar	BJP	Ranjeet Singh	INC	S. P. Singh
69	Mustafabad	AAP	Haji Yunus	BJP	Jagdish Pradhan	INC	Ali Mehdi
70	Karawal Nagar	AAP	Durgesh Pathak	BJP	Mohan Singh Bisht	INC	Arbind Singh

NOTE: The NDA has endorsed LJP candidate from Seema Puri (63) (SC). However, the LJP has also fielded candidates in the following Assembly Constituencies—Kirari (9), Bijwasan (36), Laxmi Nagar (58), and Mustafabad (69)—who were not endorsed by the NDA alliance.

== Manifestos ==
=== Aam Aadmi Party ===
The Aam Aadmi Party released a 10-point guarantee card on 19 January 2020.

- Jan Lokpal Bill
- Doorstep delivery of ration
- Pollution free Delhi
- 24 hour piped water
- Garbage free and debris free streets
- Pucca houses for slum-dwellers
- Free bus rides to students
- Underground cables to every household
- World class roads
- Legal protection of street vendors

=== Bharatiya Janata Party ===
The Bharatiya Janata Party released its manifesto on 31 January 2020 with the following key points.

- Housing for all by 2022
- Digitalization of government documents and e-libraries in courts
- Loans for women entrepreneurs
- 1000 crore fund for startup and innovation fund
- Special hostels for students and working professionals from the Northeast
- Resolve Jal Jeevan
- Redevelopment of Old Delhi and Chandni Chowk area
- Empowerment of transgender people
- Free sanitary napkins for women
- Special buses for college students
- Modification of existing infrastructure for divyang
- Double decker DTC buses and increase of frequency
- 24-hour helplines and self-defence training in schools for women
- 5% reservation for ex-servicemen in jobs and DDA flats
- Community centres for residential colonies

=== Indian National Congress ===
The Indian National Congress released its manifesto on 2 February 2020. with 9 key points:

- Strong Lokpal
- Bhagidari
- Yuva Swabhiman Yojna – Unemployment Allowances
- Yaari Startup Incubation Funds
- Homi Bhabha Research Fund
- 25% of budget spent on fighting pollution and improving transport
- Environment Ambassadors
- Jal Sanrakshan Board
- Rice Stubble to Energy Funds
- Bringing non-polluting industries back to Delhi

== Surveys and polls ==
=== Opinion Polls ===
Publishing Date	Polling Agency					Lead
Publishing Date	Polling Agency	AAP	BJP	INC	Others	Lead
2 February 2020	Patriotic Voter	58	11	1	0	47 (10.6%)
5 January 2020	News 24	48–53	15–20	0–2	0	28–38
5 January 2020	TV9 Bharatvarsh	48–60	10–20	0–2	0	28–50
6 January 2020	ABP News – CVoter	59 (53%)	8 (26%)	3 (4.6%)	0 (16%)	51 (27%)
6 January 2020	IANS – CVoter	53–64	03–13	0–6	0-0	41–61
25 January 2020	Newsx-Polstrat	53–56	12–15	2–4	0-0	38–44
3 February 2020	Times Now – IPSOS	54–60 (52%)	10–14 (34%)	0–2 (4%)	0 (10%)	40–50 (18%)
4 February 2020	Graphnile	56	12	0–2	0	44
5 February 2020	ABP News – CVoter	42–56 (45.6%)	10–24 (37.1%)	0–2 (4.4%)	0 (12.9%)	18–46 (8.6%)

=== Exit Polls ===
The exit polls were announced by agencies after the poll ends on 8 February 2020. The exit polls were conducted on all 70 seats of Delhi Legislative Assembly and data was collected up to 4:00 PM. The voting ended at 6:00 PM officially.

Publishing Date	Polling Agency					Lead
Publishing Date	Polling Agency	AAP	BJP+	INC+	Others	Lead
8 February 2020	Jan Ki Baat	55	15	0	0	40
8 February 2020	India Today-Axis My India	59-68	2–11	0	0	48–66
8 February 2020	Patriotic Voter	59	10	1	0	48
8 February 2020	Times Now	47	23	0	0	24
8 February 2020	News X-Neta	55	14	1	0	41
8 February 2020	India News Nation	55	14	1	0	41
8 February 2020	Spick Media	43-55	12 – 21	00–03	0	31–34
8 February 2020	ABP News – CVoter	51-65	3–17	0–2	0	30–58
8 February 2020	Hamari Yojana	55-60	10 – 15	00	00	40–50

== Results ==
62	8
AAP	BJP

Vote Share of different parties in the election.
1. AAP (53.6%)
2. BJP (38.5%)
3. INC (4.26%)
4. JD(U) (0.91%)
5. BSP (0.71%)
6. LJP (0.35%)
7. RJD (0.04%)
8. NOTA (0.46%)
9. Other (1.19%)

=== Results by Party ===
Alliance/ Party		Popular vote			Seats			
Alliance/ Party		Votes	%	±pp	Contested	Won	+/−	%
Aam Aadmi Party		4,974,592	53.57	▼0.73	70	62	▼5	88.57
NDA	Bharatiya Janata Party	3,575,529	38.51	▲6.21	67	8	▲5	11.43
NDA	Janata Dal (United)	84,263	0.91	▲0.91	2	0	0	0
NDA	Lok Janshakti Party	32,760	0.35	▲0.35	1	0	0	0
NDA	Total	3,692,552	39.77	▲7.47	70	8	▲5	11.43
UPA	Indian National Congress	395,958	4.26	▼5.44	66	0	Steady	0
UPA	Rashtriya Janata Dal	3,463	0.04	▲0.04	4	0	Steady	0
UPA	Total	399,421	4.30	▼5.40	70	0	Steady	0
Bahujan Samaj Party		66,141	0.71	▼0.59	70	0	Steady	0
Others		109,552	1.19	▲0.19	388	0	0	0
NOTA		43,109	0.46	▲0.06				
Total		9,285,798	100.00	Steady	668	70	Steady	100
Valid votes		9,285,798	99.89					
Invalid votes		9,995	0.11					
Votes cast / turnout		9,295,793	62.82					
Abstentions		5,502,197	37.18					
Registered voters		14,797,990						

=== Results by districts ===
District	Seats		
District	Seats	AAP	BJP
North Delhi	8	7	1
Central Delhi	7	7	—N/a
North West Delhi	7	7	—N/a
West Delhi	7	7	—N/a
New Delhi	6	6	—N/a
South West Delhi	7	7	—N/a
South East Delhi	7	6	1
South Delhi	5	5	—N/a
East Delhi	6	4	2
Shahdara	5	3	2
North East Delhi	5	3	2
Total	70	62	8

=== Results by constituency ===
Assembly Constituency		Turnout (%)	Winner				Runner-up				Margin
#	Name	Turnout (%)	Candidate	Party	Votes	%	Candidate	Party	Votes	%	Margin
North Delhi District
1	Narela	65.34	Sharad Chauhan	AAP	86262	52.06	Neel Daman Khatri	BJP	68833	41.54	17429
Central Delhi District
2	Burari	61.48	Sanjeev Jha	AAP	139598	62.81	Shailendra Kumar	JD(U)	51440	23.14	88158
3	Timarpur	60.93	Dilip Pandey	AAP	71432	57.6	Surinder Pal Singh	BJP	47288	38.13	24144
North Delhi District
4	Adarsh Nagar	59.86	Pawan Kumar Sharma	AAP	46892	45.2	Raj Kumar Bhatia	BJP	45303	43.66	1589
5	Badli	63.61	Ajesh Yadav	AAP	69357	49.67	Vijay Kumar Bhagat	BJP	40234	28.81	29123
North West Delhi District
6	Rithala	59.80	Mohinder Goyal	AAP	87940	52.63	Manish Chaudhary	BJP	74067	44.33	13873
North Delhi District
7	Bawana(SC)	61.97	Jai Bhagwan	AAP	95715	48.38	Ravinder Kumar	BJP	84189	42.55	11526
North West Delhi District
8	Mundka	59.44	Dharampal Lakra	AAP	90293	53.78	Azad Singh	BJP	71135	42.37	19158
9	Kirari	63.36	Rituraj Govind	AAP	86312	49.77	Anil Jha Vats	BJP	80551	46.51	5654
10	Sultanpur Majra(SC)	63.88	Mukesh Kumar Ahlawat	AAP	74573	66.51	Ram Chander Chawriya	BJP	26521	23.65	48052
West Delhi District
11	Nangloi Jat	56.80	Raghuvinder Shokeen	AAP	74444	49.21	Suman Lata	BJP	62820	41.53	11624
North West Delhi District
12	Mangol Puri(SC)	66.48	Rakhi Birla	AAP	74154	58.53	Karam Singh Karma	BJP	44038	34.76	30116
North Delhi District
13	Rohini	63.31	Vijender Gupta	BJP	62174	53.67	Rajesh Nama 'Bansiwala'	AAP	49526	42.75	12648
North West Delhi District
14	Shalimar Bagh	61.80	Bandana Kumari	AAP	57707	49.41	Rekha Gupta	BJP	54267	46.46	3440
North Delhi District
15	Shakur Basti	67.87	Satyendra Kumar Jain	AAP	51165	51.6	S. C. Vats	BJP	43573	43.94	7592
North West Delhi District
16	Tri Nagar	66.55	Preeti Tomar	AAP	58504	52.38	Tilak Ram Gupta	BJP	47794	42.79	10710
North Delhi District
17	Wazirpur	60.50	Rajesh Gupta	AAP	57331	52.64	Dr. Mahender Nagpal	BJP	45641	41.91	11690
18	Model Town	59.54	Akhilesh Pati Tripathi	AAP	52665	52.58	Kapil Mishra	BJP	41532	41.46	11133
Central Delhi District
19	Sadar Bazar	66.80	Som Dutt	AAP	68790	55.71	Jai Parkash	BJP	43146	34.94	25644
20	Chandni Chowk	61.43	Parlad Singh Sawhney	AAP	50891	65.92	Suman Kumar Gupta	BJP	21307	27.6	29584
21	Matia Mahal	70.43	Shoaib Iqbal	AAP	67282	75.96	Ravinder Gupta	BJP	17041	19.24	50241
22	Ballimaran	71.64	Imran Hussain	AAP	65644	64.65	Lata	BJP	29472	29.03	36172
23	Karol Bagh(SC)	61.16	Vishesh Ravi	AAP	67494	62.23	Yogender Chandoliya	BJP	35734	32.95	31760
New Delhi District
24	Patel Nagar(SC)	61.00	Raaj Kumar Anand	AAP	73463	60.81	Pravesh Ratn	BJP	42528	35.2	30935
West Delhi District
25	Moti Nagar	61.94	Shiv Charan Goel	AAP	60622	53.83	Subhash Sachdeva	BJP	46550	41.34	14072
26	Madipur(SC)	65.79	Girish Soni	AAP	64440	56	Kailash Sankla	BJP	41721	36.26	22719
27	Rajouri Garden	62.01	Dhanwati Chandela	AAP	62212	55.7	Ramesh Khanna	BJP	39420	35.13	22972
28	Hari Nagar	61.86	Raj Kumari Dhillon	AAP	58087	53.67	Tajinder Pal Singh Bagga	BJP	37956	35.07	20131
29	Tilak Nagar	63.96	Jarnail Singh	AAP	62436	62.2	Rajiv Babbar	BJP	34407	34.28	28029
30	Janakpuri	65.85	Rajesh Rishi	AAP	67968	54.43	Ashish Sood	BJP	53051	42.48	14917
South West Delhi District
31	Vikaspuri	59.49	Mahinder Yadav	AAP	133898	55.95	Sanjay Singh	BJP	91840	38.38	42058
32	Uttam Nagar	64.12	Naresh Balyan	AAP	99622	54.57	Krishan Gahlot	BJP	79863	43.75	19759
33	Dwarka	62.21	Vinay Mishra	AAP	71003	52.08	Parduymn Rajput	BJP	56616	41.53	14387
34	Matiala	61.56	Gulab Singh	AAP	139010	53.2	Rajesh Gahlot	BJP	110935	42.45	28075
35	Najafgarh	64.93	Kailash Gahlot	AAP	81507	49.86	Ajeet Singh Kharkhari	BJP	75276	46.05	6231
36	Bijwasan	62.04	Bhupinder Singh Joon	AAP	57271	45.83	Sat Prakash Rana	BJP	56203	45.22	753
37	Palam	63.37	Bhavna Gaur	AAP	92775	59.15	Vijay Pandit	BJP	60010	38.26	32765
New Delhi District
38	Delhi Cantonment	45.48	Virender Singh Kadian	AAP	28971	49.17	Manish Singh	BJP	18381	31.19	10590
39	Rajinder Nagar	58.50	Raghav Chadha	AAP	59135	57.06	Sardar R. P. Singh	BJP	39077	37.7	20058
40	New Delhi	52.45	Arvind Kejriwal	AAP	46578	61.1	Sunil Kumar Yadav	BJP	25061	32.75	21697
South East Delhi District
41	Jangpura	60.66	Praveen Kumar	AAP	45133	50.88	Impreet Singh Bakshi	BJP	29070	32.77	16063
42	Kasturba Nagar	59.87	Madan Lal	AAP	37100	40.45	Ravinder Choudhry	BJP	33935	37	3165
South Delhi District
43	Malviya Nagar	58.92	Somnath Bharti	AAP	52043	57.97	Shailender Singh	BJP	33899	37.76	18144
New Delhi District
44	R K Puram	57.02	Pramila Tokas	AAP	47208	52.45	Anil Kumar Sharma	BJP	36839	40.93	10369
South Delhi District
45	Mehrauli	56.68	Naresh Yadav	AAP	62417	54.27	Kusum Khatri	BJP	44256	38.48	18161
46	Chhatarpur	64.59	Kartar Singh Tanwar	AAP	69411	49.13	Brahm Singh Tanwar	BJP	65691	46.5	3720
47	Deoli(SC)	63.53	Prakash Jarwal	AAP	92575	61.59	Arvind Kumar	BJP	52402	34.86	40173
48	Ambedkar Nagar(SC)	64.29	Ajay Dutt	AAP	62871	62.25	Khushiram Chunar	BJP	34544	34.2	28327
South East Delhi District
49	Sangam Vihar	62.20	Dinesh Mohaniya	AAP	75345	64.58	Shiv Charan Lal Gupta	JD(U)	32823	28.13	42522
New Delhi District
50	Greater Kailash	60.12	Saurabh Bhardwaj	AAP	60372	55.62	Shikha Roy	BJP	43563	40.13	16809
South East Delhi District
51	Kalkaji	57.51	Atishi Marlena	AAP	55897	52.28	Dharambir Singh	BJP	44504	41.63	11393
52	Tughlakabad	60.84	Sahiram	AAP	58905	54.51	Vikram Bidhuri	BJP	45147	41.77	13758
53	Badarpur	59.57	Ramvir Singh Bidhuri	BJP	90082	47.05	Ram Singh Netaji	AAP	86363	45.11	3719
54	Okhla	58.97	Amanatullah Khan	AAP	130367	66.03	Braham Singh	BJP	58540	29.65	71827
East Delhi District
55	Trilokpuri(SC)	66.67	Rohit Kumar Mehraulia	AAP	69947	52.36	Kiran	BJP	57461	43.01	12486
56	Kondli(SC)	67.30	Kuldeep Kumar	AAP	68348	53.11	Raj Kumar	BJP	50441	39.2	17907
57	Patparganj	61.52	Manish Sisodia	AAP	70163	49.33	Ravinder Singh Negi	BJP	66956	47.07	3207
58	Laxmi Nagar	61.74	Abhay Verma	BJP	65735	48.04	Nitin Tyagi	AAP	64855	47.4	880
Shahdara District
59	Vishwas Nagar	62.65	Om Prakash Sharma	BJP	65830	52.57	Deepak Singla	AAP	49373	39.42	16457
East Delhi District
60	Krishna Nagar	67.60	S.K. Bagga	AAP	72111	49.1	Anil Goyal	BJP	68116	46.38	3995
61	Gandhi Nagar	62.69	Anil Kumar Bajpai	BJP	48824	42.64	Naveen Chaudhary	AAP	42745	37.33	6079
Shahdara District
62	Shahdara	66.22	Ram Niwas Goel	AAP	62103	49.53	Sanjay Goyal	BJP	56809	45.31	5294
63	Seemapuri(SC)	68.48	Rajendra Pal Gautam	AAP	88392	65.82	Sant Lal	LJP	32284	24.04	56108
64	Rohtas Nagar	67.83	Jitender Mahajan	BJP	73873	51.94	Sarita Singh	AAP	60632	42.63	13241
North East Delhi District
65	Seelampur	71.42	Abdul Rehman	AAP	72694	56.05	Kaushal Kumar Mishra	BJP	35774	27.58	36920
66	Ghonda	63.94	Ajay Mahawar	BJP	81797	57.55	Shri Dutt Sharma	AAP	53427	37.59	28370
Shahdara District
67	Babarpur	65.77	Gopal Rai	AAP	84776	59.39	Naresh Gaur	BJP	51714	36.23	33062
North East Delhi District
68	Gokalpur(SC)	70.92	Surendra Kumar	AAP	88452	53.22	Ranjeet Singh	BJP	68964	41.5	19488
69	Mustafabad	70.75	Haji Yunus	AAP	98850	53.2	Jagdish Pradhan	BJP	78146	42.06	20704
70	Karawal Nagar	67.55	Mohan Singh Bisht	BJP	96721	50.59	Durgesh Pathak	AAP	88498	46.29	8223

== Aftermath ==
Third Kejriwal ministry of the Delhi government was formed on 16 February 2020, led by Kejriwal as Delhi's chief minister for a third time at Ramlila Maidan.

== Bypolls (2020–2025) ==
Date	S.No	Constituency	MLA before election	Party before election	Elected MLA	Party after election
23 June 2022	39	Rajinder Nagar	Raghav Chadha	Aam Aadmi Party	Durgesh Pathak	Aam Aadmi Party

== See also ==
- 2020 elections in India
- 2019 Indian general election in Delhi
- 2017 Municipal Corporation of Delhi election
