= Shiv Charan Goel =

Indian politician

Member of the Delhi Legislative Assembly for Moti Nagar
- In office 11 February 2020 – 8 February 2025
- Preceded by: Subhash Sachdeva
- Succeeded by: Harish Khurana

Community Center, Block B, New Moti Nagar.

Personal details
- Born: 6 February 1962 (age 64) New Delhi, India
- Citizenship: Indian
- Party: Aam Aadmi Party
- Children: 2
- Occupation: Politician and social worker.

Shiv Charan Goel (born 6 February 1962) is an Indian politician from the Aam Aadmi Party and a member of the Sixth Legislative Assembly of Delhi (Feb 2015 to Jan 2020). He represented the Moti Nagar (Assembly constituency) of Delhi and has been elected twice as the MLA of the constituency. He is currently the Chairman of Acharya Bhikshu Hospital (Rogi Kalyan Samiti) situated in Moti Nagar. He is also a member of several Departments and committees like Special Enquiry Committee of Sports, Standing Committee on Health, Tihar Jail and Rohini Jail, Private Member's and Bills Resolution Committee, Reform of Business Advisory Committee of the Government of Delhi.

== Early life and career ==
Born on 6 February 1962 in New Delhi, he was raised in the capital city and received his primary education from New States Academy, Ashoka Park and did his High school from Swami Shivananda Memorial, East Punjabi Bagh. He also went to West Punjabi Bagh Government Senior Secondary Boys school for his class 11th and 12th.

== Political career ==
In 2015 he contested the Legislative Assembly elections in Delhi from Moti Nagar constituency in West Delhi and won by a margin of 15,200 votes, defeating Subhash Sachdeva of the Bhartiya Janta Party. He was re-elected as the MLA from Moti Nagar in February 2020 against the same opposition. He lost in 2025.

== Posts Held ==
#	From	To	Position	Comments
01	2015	2020	Member, Sixth Legislative Assembly of Delhi	
02	2020	2025	Member, Legislative Assembly of Delhi	

== See also ==
- Sixth Legislative Assembly of Delhi
- Delhi Legislative Assembly
- Government of India
- Politics of India
- Aam Aadmi Party

== Electoral performance ==
=== 2025 ===
Delhi Assembly elections, 2025: Moti Nagar
Party	Candidate	Votes	%	±%
BJP	Harish Khurana	57565		
AAP	Shiv Charan Goel	45908		
INC	Rajender Namdhari	3334		
NOTA	None of the above	689		
Majority		11657		
Turnout		109361		
BJP hold		Swing		

Delhi Assembly elections, 2020: Moti Nagar
Party	Candidate	Votes	%	±%
AAP	Shiv Charan Goel	60,622	53.83	+0.77
BJP	Subhash Sachdeva	46,550	41.34	+1.68
INC	Ramesh Popli	3,152	2.80	−2.58
BSP	Nitya Nand Singh	581	0.52	
Majority		14,072	12.55	−0.86
Turnout		1,12,665	61.94	−7.64
AAP hold		Swing		

State Legislative Assembly
Preceded by ?	Member of the Delhi Legislative Assembly from Moti Nagar Assembly constituency 2020– 2025	Succeeded by Harish Khurana
