= Arvinder Singh Lovely (politician, born 1968) =

Indian politician

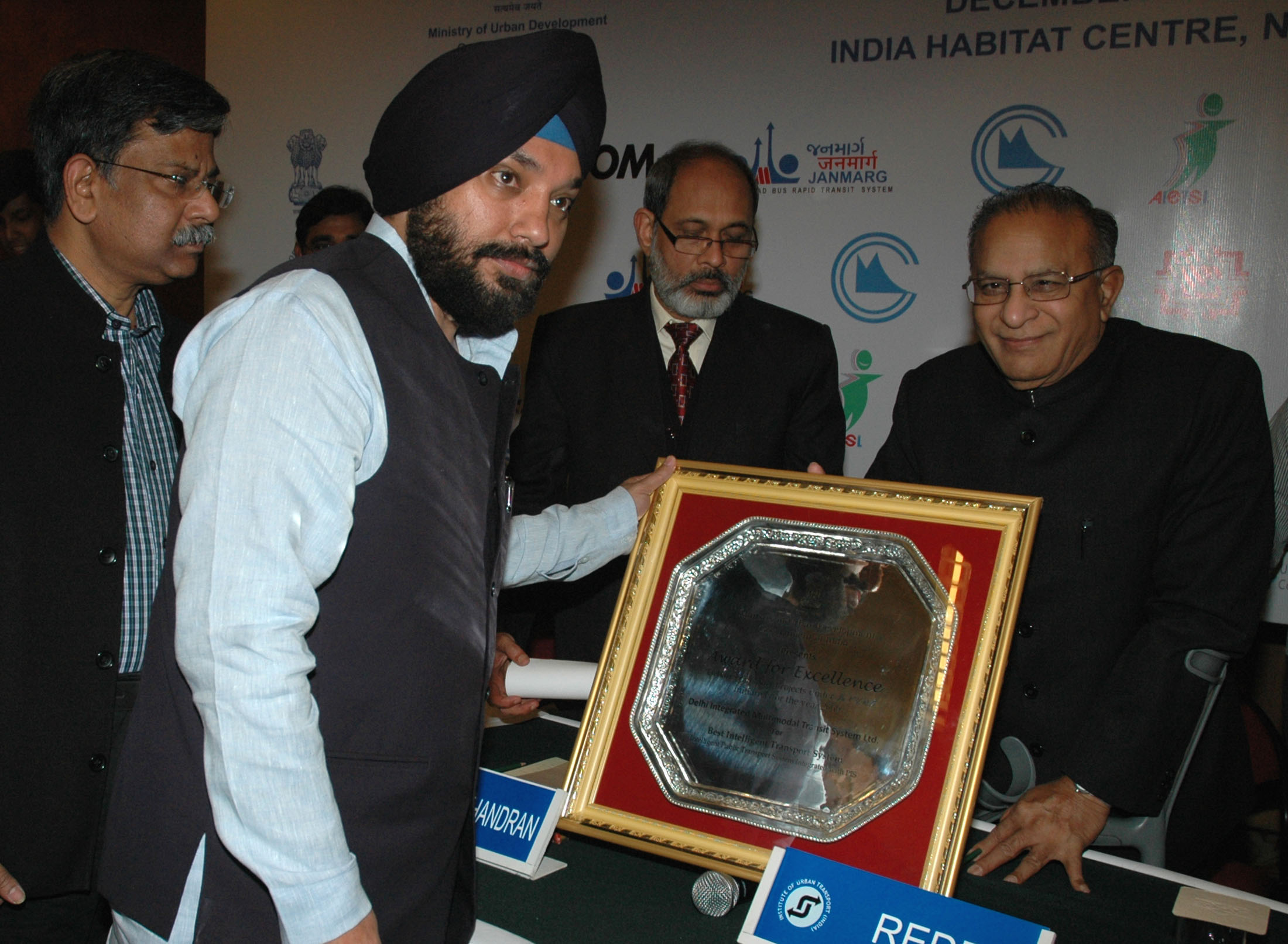
- Arvinder Singh Lovely receiving the National Award for Excellence in Urban Transport from the Union Minister of Urban Development, Shri S. Jaipal Reddy, at the Valedictory Session of the 2nd Urban Mobility India Conference, 2009

Member of the Delhi Legislative Assembly
- Incumbent
- Assumed office 8 February 2025
- Preceded by: Anil Kumar Bajpai
- Constituency: Gandhi Nagar
- In office 25 November 1998 – 10 February 2015
- Preceded by: Darshan Kumar Bahl
- Succeeded by: Anil Kumar Bajpai
- Constituency: Gandhi Nagar

Cabinet Minister, Government of Delhi
- In office 15 December 2003 – 27 November 2013
- Lieutenant Governor: Vijai Kapoor; Banwari Lal Joshi; Najeeb Jung
- Ministries and Departments: Education; Urban Development & Revenue; Transport; Languages; Tourism; Gurudwara Elections; Local Bodies & Gurudwara Administration

President, Delhi Pradesh Congress Committee
- In office 31 August 2023 – 28 April 2024
- Preceded by: Anil Chaudhary
- Succeeded by: Devender Yadav (interim)
- In office 20 December 2013 – 10 February 2015
- Preceded by: Jai Parkash Aggarwal
- Succeeded by: Ajay Maken

Personal details
- Born: 11 December 1968 (age 57) Delhi, India
- Party: Bharatiya Janata Party (2017–2018; 2024–present)
- Other political affiliations: Indian National Congress (1998–2017; 2018–2024)
- Spouse: Gurveen Kaur
- Children: Navjot Singh; Parminder Singh
- Parent: Balwinder Singh (father)

Arvinder Singh Lovely (born 11 December 1968) is an Indian politician from Delhi, currently serving as a Member of the Delhi Legislative Assembly from the Gandhi Nagar constituency. He is a five-term MLA, having represented Gandhi Nagar in the Delhi Assembly from 1998 to 2015 and again since 2025 as a Bharatiya Janata Party (BJP) legislator.

He earlier served as a Cabinet Minister in the Government of Delhi for over a decade (2003–2013) under Chief Minister Sheila Dikshit, handling key portfolios including Transport, Education, Urban Development, Revenue, Tourism, and Gurudwara Elections.

Lovely also served twice as President of the Delhi Pradesh Congress Committee, first from 2013 to 2015 and again from 2023 to 2024.

He was the pro-tem Speaker of the Delhi Assembly and was recently appointed Chairman of the Trans Yamuna Development Board, a position with the status equivalent to that of a Cabinet Minister in the Delhi government.

== Early life and education ==
Lovely was born in Gandhinagar, he is the son of Balwinder Singh. He completed his graduation in political science at SGTB Khalsa College which is affiliated with University of Delhi. He started as students leader and was elected as the chairman of Bhimrao Ambedkar College, Delhi. He married Gurveen Kaur and together they have two sons.

== Career ==
Arvinder Singh Lovely began his political career as a student leader. He was elected General Secretary of the Delhi Pradesh Youth Congress in 1990 and later served as General Secretary of the NSUI from 1992 to 1996.

He was first elected to the Delhi Legislative Assembly in the 1998 Delhi Legislative Assembly election from the Gandhi Nagar constituency at the age of 28, making him the youngest MLA in the Delhi Assembly at that time.

In 2003, at the age of 33, he became the youngest member of the Sheila Dikshit-led Delhi Cabinet, holding several key portfolios during his tenure from 2003 to 2013. These included Urban Development & Revenue, Education, Transport, Tourism, Languages, Gurudwara Elections, Local Bodies & Gurudwara Administration.

Lovely represented Gandhi Nagar for four consecutive terms (1998, 2003, 2008 and 2013) and returned to the Assembly in 2025 for a fifth term after winning the constituency once again. He was nominated as the senior-most member and subsequently appointed as the Pro-tem Speaker for the 2025 session of the Delhi Vidhan Sabha. He was later appointed Chairman of the Trans Yamuna Development Board, a position accorded the status equivalent to that of a Cabinet Minister in the Delhi Government.

In the 2025 Delhi Legislative Assembly election, he contested as a Bharatiya Janata Party candidate from Gandhi Nagar and won with 56,858 votes, defeating his nearest rival Aam Aadmi Party candidate Naveen Chaudhary by a margin of 12,748 votes. He secured a vote share of 53.94%.

Lovely served as President of the Delhi Pradesh Congress Committee twice, from 2013 to 2015 and again from 2023 to 2024.

He left the Indian National Congress in April 2017 to join the BJP, rejoined Congress in February 2018, and eventually returned to the BJP in May 2024.
