= Bhisham Sharma =

Indian politician

Member of Legislative Assembly for Ghonda
- In office 1998–2008
- Succeeded by: Sahab Singh Chauhan

Personal details
- Party: Indian National Congress
- Other political affiliations: Bharatiya Janata Party

Bhisham Sharma is an Indian politician and is member of the Second and Third Legislative Assembly of Delhi. He is a member of the Indian National Congress and represents Ghonda (Assembly constituency) of Delhi.
