= Moti Nagar Assembly constituency =

Constituency of the Delhi legislative assembly in India

Coordinates: 28.66°N 77.14°E

Moti Nagar
- Constituency No. 24 for the Delhi Legislative Assembly

Constituency details
- Country: India
- Region: North India
- State: Delhi
- District: New Delhi
- Lok Sabha constituency: New Delhi
- Reservation: None

Member of Legislative Assembly
- 8th Delhi Legislative Assembly
- Incumbent Harish Khurana
- Party: Bharatiya Janata Party
- Elected year: 2025

Moti Nagar Assembly constituency is one of the seventy Delhi assembly constituencies of Delhi, India. Moti Nagar assembly constituency is a part of New Delhi (Lok Sabha constituency).

== Members of the Legislative Assembly ==
| Year | Member | Party |
|---|---|---|
| 1993 | Madan Lal Khurana | Bharatiya Janata Party |
| 1998 | Avinash Sahni | Bharatiya Janata Party |
| 2003 | Madan Lal Khurana | Bharatiya Janata Party |
| 2004^ | Subhash Sachdeva | Bharatiya Janata Party |
| 2008 | Subhash Sachdeva | Bharatiya Janata Party |
| 2013 | Subhash Sachdeva | Bharatiya Janata Party |
| 2015 | Shiv Charan Goel | Aam Aadmi Party |
| 2020 | Shiv Charan Goel | Aam Aadmi Party |
| 2025 | Harish Khurana | Bharatiya Janata Party |

== Election results ==
=== 2025 ===
Delhi Assembly elections, 2025: Moti Nagar
| Party | Candidate | Votes | % | ±% |
|---|---|---|---|---|
| BJP | Harish Khurana | 57565 | | |
| AAP | Shiv Charan Goel | 45908 | | |
| INC | Rajender Namdhari | 3334 | | |
| NOTA | None of the above | 689 | | |
| Majority | | 11657 | | |
| Turnout | | 109361 | | |
| BJP hold | | Swing | | |

=== 2020 ===
Delhi Assembly elections, 2020: Moti Nagar
| Party | Candidate | Votes | % | ±% |
|---|---|---|---|---|
| AAP | Shiv Charan Goel | 60,622 | 53.83 | +0.77 |
| BJP | Subhash Sachdeva | 46,550 | 41.34 | +1.68 |
| INC | Ramesh Popli | 3,152 | 2.80 | −2.58 |
| BSP | Nitya Nand Singh | 581 | 0.52 | |
| Majority | | 14,072 | 12.55 | −0.86 |
| Turnout | | 1,12,665 | 61.94 | −7.64 |
| AAP hold | | Swing | | |

=== 2015 ===
Delhi Assembly elections, 2015: Moti Nagar
| Party | Candidate | Votes | % | ±% |
|---|---|---|---|---|
| AAP | Shiv Charan Goel | 60,223 | 53.07 | +26.60 |
| BJP | Subhash Sachdeva | 45,002 | 39.66 | −2.76 |
| INC | Raj Kumar Maggo | 6,111 | 5.38 | −19.91 |
| BSP | Avinash Gupta | 666 | 0.58 | −1.00 |
| NOTA | None of the above | 471 | 0.41 | −0.19 |
| Majority | | 15,221 | 13.41 | −2.54 |
| Turnout | | 1,13,378 | 69.58 | |
| AAP gain from BJP | | Swing | +25.22 | |

=== 2013 ===
Delhi Assembly elections, 2013: Moti Nagar
| Party | Candidate | Votes | % | ±% |
|---|---|---|---|---|
| BJP | Subhash Sachdeva | 42,599 | 42.42 | −12.07 |
| AAP | Kuldeep Singh Channa | 26,578 | 26.47 | |
| INC | Sushil Kumar Gupta | 25,393 | 25.29 | −11.67 |
| Independent | Sanjeev Gupta | 2,681 | 2.67 | +2.22 |
| BSP | Avinash Gupta | 1,583 | 1.58 | −4.06 |
| SP | Abdul Waheed | 334 | 0.33 | −0.27 |
| Independent | Siya Ram Garg | 162 | 0.16 | |
| RJP | Daya Nand Singh | 148 | 0.15 | |
| BSMM | Jagdish Chandra | 102 | 0.10 | |
| Independent | Rakesh Khanduri | 92 | 0.09 | |
| NDP | Sanjay Rai | 65 | 0.06 | |
| Independent | Mahaveer Sharma | 42 | 0.04 | |
| Independent | Om Prakash | 37 | 0.04 | |
| NOTA | None | 604 | 0.60 | |
| Majority | | 16,021 | 15.95 | −1.58 |
| Turnout | | 1,00,478 | 68.99 | |
| BJP hold | | Swing | -12.07 | |

=== 2008 ===
Delhi Assembly elections, 2008: Moti Nagar
| Party | Candidate | Votes | % | ±% |
|---|---|---|---|---|
| BJP | Subash Sachdeva | 46,616 | 54.49 | −2.09 |
| INC | Anjali Rai | 31,619 | 36.96 | −3.45 |
| BSP | Virender Kumar Mahajan | 4,823 | 5.64 | +3.87 |
| SP | Lal Babu Pandey | 512 | 0.60 | |
| LJP | Abdul Waheed | 460 | 0.54 | |
| Independent | Sanjeev Gupta | 381 | 0.45 | +0.10 |
| Independent | Mathuresh Lal | 223 | 0.26 | |
| Independent | Manish Kumar Sharma | 203 | 0.24 | |
| DBP | Sunita Devi | 181 | 0.21 | |
| Independent | Mumtaj | 170 | 0.20 | |
| RSMD | Feku Ram | 112 | 0.13 | |
| Independent | Rakesh Sharma | 110 | 0.13 | |
| Independent | Charanjeev Mehta | 77 | 0.09 | |
| Independent | Amit Dutt | 59 | 0.07 | |
| Majority | | 14,997 | 17.53 | +1.36 |
| Turnout | | 85,546 | 61.5 | −0.62 |
| BJP hold | | Swing | -2.09 | |

=== 2004 By Election results ===
Delhi Legislative Assembly By election, 2004: Moti Nagar
| Party | Candidate | Votes | % | ±% |
|---|---|---|---|---|
| BJP | Subhash Sachdeva | 34,908 | 56.58 | −4.77 |
| INC | Ram Maggo | 24,931 | 40.41 | +4.21 |
| BSP | Surya Prakash Navin | 1,092 | 1.77 | |
| Independent | Roshan Lal Kapoor | 180 | 0.29 | |
| Independent | Md Heera | 154 | 0.25 | |
| Independent | Anil Kumar Chadha | 128 | 0.21 | |
| JMM | Balram Thakur | 96 | 0.16 | |
| Independent | Md Salim | 58 | 0.05 | |
| RSBP | Rajkumar Gautam | 55 | 0.09 | |
| Independent | Subhash Chopra | 53 | 0.09 | |
| Independent | Subhash Chander | 25 | 0.04 | |
| Independent | Jinder Sachdeva | 18 | 0.03 | |
| Majority | | 9,977 | 16.17 | −8.98 |
| Turnout | | 61,698 | 62.12 | −0.22 |
| BJP hold | | Swing | -4.77 | |

=== 2003 ===
Delhi Assembly elections, 2003: Moti Nagar
| Party | Candidate | Votes | % | ±% |
|---|---|---|---|---|
| BJP | Madan Lal Khurana | 37,051 | 61.35 | +11.48 |
| INC | Alka Lamba | 21,861 | 36.20 | −8.09 |
| AB | Anil Kumar Chadha | 313 | 0.52 | |
| NCP | Kishore Gohri | 255 | 0.42 | |
| JD(S) | Ram Niwas Chandervansh | 249 | 0.41 | |
| Independent | Sanjeev Gupta | 211 | 0.35 | |
| Independent | Madan Lal | 109 | 0.18 | |
| Independent | Anil Kumar | 83 | 0.14 | |
| JKNPP | Bhola Nath Shukla | 77 | 0.13 | |
| RAM | Gopi Chand | 58 | 0.10 | |
| Independent | Mohd Islam | 51 | 0.08 | |
| Independent | Nand Kishore Jaggi | 44 | 0.07 | |
| RSMD | Mahinder Singh | 31 | 0.05 | |
| Majority | | 15,190 | 25.15 | +19.57 |
| Turnout | | 60,393 | 62.34 | −8.99 |
| BJP hold | | Swing | +11.48 | |

=== 1998 ===
Delhi Assembly elections, 1998: Moti Nagar
| Party | Candidate | Votes | % | ±% |
|---|---|---|---|---|
| BJP | Avinash Sahni | 29,589 | 49.87 | −4.23 |
| INC | Kanwaljit Singh | 26,280 | 44.29 | +4.95 |
| BSP | Moti Ram | 2,640 | 4.45 | +1.03 |
| SS | Subhash Goel | 616 | 1.04 | +0.63 |
| Independent | Ashok Kumar Munna | 127 | 0.21 | |
| Independent | Paramjit Singh | 61 | 0.10 | |
| Independent | Jahangir | 25 | 0.04 | |
| Majority | | 3,309 | 5.58 | −9.18 |
| Turnout | | 59,338 | 53.35 | −17.06 |
| BJP hold | | Swing | -4.23 | |

=== 1993 ===
Delhi Assembly elections, 1993: Moti Nagar
| Party | Candidate | Votes | % | ±% |
|---|---|---|---|---|
| BJP | Madan Lal Khurana | 33,503 | 54.10 | |
| INC | Anjali Ram | 24,365 | 39.34 | |
| BSP | Ram Avhal | 2,115 | 3.42 | |
| JD | Kedar Nath Jha | 907 | 1.46 | |
| Independent | Jathedar Trilochan Singh | 267 | 0.43 | |
| SS | Shiv Dass Puri | 252 | 0.41 | |
| Independent | Narinder Singh | 89 | 0.14 | |
| Independent | Ramesh Khullar | 81 | 0.13 | |
| Independent | Kulbir Singh | 67 | 0.11 | |
| Independent | S S Chauhen | 53 | 0.09 | |
| Independent | Satnam Singh | 48 | 0.08 | |
| Independent | Kedar Nath | 44 | 0.07 | |
| Independent | Rajinder Kumar Garg | 42 | 0.07 | |
| Independent | Usha Singh | 28 | 0.04 | |
| Independent | Kasturi Lal Khanna | 27 | 0.04 | |
| Independent | Rajinder Singh | 20 | 0.03 | |
| Independent | Vijay Kumar Nagpal | 20 | 0.03 | |
| Majority | | 9,138 | 14.76 | |
| Turnout | | 61,928 | 70.41 | |
| BJP hold | | Swing | | |
