= Anoop Kumar Mendiratta =

Judge of Delhi High Court (born 1963)

Hon'ble Justice (Retd.) Anoop Kumar Mendiratta
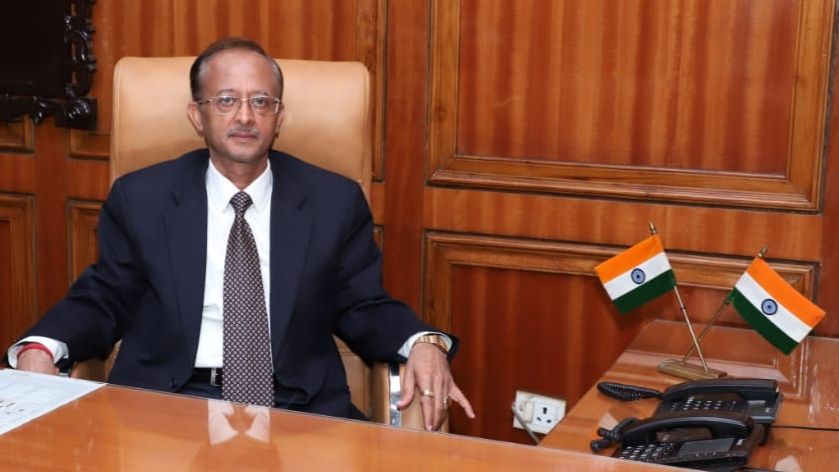

Judge of Delhi High Court
- In office 28 February 2022 – 5 March 2025
- Nominated by: N. V. Ramana
- Appointed by: Ram Nath Kovind

Law Secretary of India
- In office 23 October 2019 – 27 February 2022
- Prime Minister: Narendra Modi
- Minister: Ravi Shankar Prasad; Kiren Rijiju
- Preceded by: Alok Srivastava, IAS

Personal details
- Born: 6 March 1963 (age 63)

Presently Member National Consumer Disputes Redressal Commission with effect from 9 April 2025

Anoop Kumar Mendiratta (born 6 March 1963) is an Indian Judge. He is a former Judge of Delhi High Court. Previously, he has served as Law Secretary of India.

== Career ==
He has served as district and sessions judge at North-East Delhi District Court. As a judge, Mendiratta headed the Motor Accidents Claim Tribunal, and served as a CBI special judge in 2012.

He also served as the Principal Secretary (Law) in the Government of the National Capital Territory of Delhi, during which he had disagreements with Delhi law minister Kailash Gahlot, resulting in his repatriation to his parent judicial cadre.

=== Law Secretary ===
Mendiratta was appointed Secretary (Legal Affairs), heading the Department of Legal Affairs in the Ministry of Law and Justice, on deputation from the judicial service, by the Appointments Committee of the Cabinet, on the advice of a search-cum-selection committee, which interviewed more than 60 people for the job. His appointment marked the first time a serving judge was appointed Law Secretary, breaking the earlier tradition of appointing Indian Legal Service officers to the post, although recruitment rules had always provided for the possibility of a serving district judge being appointed.

=== Judge ===
Mendiratta was appointed Judge of Delhi High Court on 25 February 2022.
