= Mundka Assembly constituency =

Constituency of the Delhi legislative assembly in India

Coordinates: 28.69°N 77.02°E

Mundka
- Constituency No. 8 for the Delhi Legislative Assembly

Constituency details
- Country: India
- Region: North India
- State: Delhi
- District: North West Delhi
- Lok Sabha constituency: North West Delhi
- Established: 2008
- Reservation: None

Member of Legislative Assembly
- 8th Delhi Legislative Assembly
- Incumbent Gajender Drall
- Party: Bharatiya Janata Party
- Elected year: 2025

Mundka Assembly constituency is one of the seventy Delhi assembly constituencies of Delhi in northern India.

Mundka assembly constituency is a part of North West Delhi Lok Sabha constituency. This constituency was created by reorganization by delimitation commission in 2008.

== Assembly segment and councillors ==
After 2016 delimitation, Mundka assembly has 5 wards.

Ward No	Member	Party	Elections
36	Jayender Kumar Dabas	Bharatiya Janata Party	2017 Delhi MCD elections
35	Poonam Dabas	Bharatiya Janata Party	2017 Delhi MCD elections
37	Jyoti Racchoya	Bharatiya Janata Party	2017 Delhi MCD elections
38	Babina Pawanjeet Shokeen	Aam Aadmi Party	2017 Delhi MCD elections
39	Anil Lakra	Aam Aadmi Party	2017 Delhi MCD elections

== Members of the Legislative Assembly ==
Year	Member	Party
2008	Manoj Kumar Shokeen	Bharatiya Janata Party
2013	Rambir Shokeen	Independent
2015	Sukhbir Singh Dalal	Aam Aadmi Party
2020	Dharampal Lakra	Aam Aadmi Party
2025	Gajender Singh Drall	Bharatiya Janata Party

== Election results ==
=== 2025 ===
Delhi Assembly elections, 2025: Mundka
Party	Candidate	Votes	%	±%
BJP	Gajender Drall	89,839	47.07	▲4.70
AAP	Jasbir Karala	79,289	41.54	▼12.24
INC	Dharampal Lakra	10,290	5.39	▲2.36
NOTA	None of the above	1,088	0.30	
Majority		10,550	5.6	▼5.81
Turnout		1,89,765	60.6	▲1.16
BJP gain from AAP		Swing		

=== 2020 ===
Delhi Assembly elections, 2020: Mundka
Party	Candidate	Votes	%	±%
AAP	Dharampal Lakra	90,293	53.78	−3.44
BJP	Master Azad Singh	71,135	42.37	+9.95
INC	Naresh Kumar	5,082	3.03	−5.14
NOTA	None of the above	903	0.54	+0.19
SBP	Chetram	273	0.16	N/A
Majority		19,158	11.41	−13.39
Turnout		1,67,208	59.44	−3.56
AAP hold		Swing	-3.44	

=== 2015 election ===
Delhi Assembly elections, 2015: Mundka
Party	Candidate	Votes	%	±%
AAP	Sukhbir Singh Dalal	94,206	57.24	+41.68
BJP	Master Azad Singh	53,380	32.44	+2.82
INC	Rita Shokeen	13,446	8.17	−4.32
BSP	Om Prakash	778	0.47	−1.37
NOTA	None of the above	576	0.35	−0.13
Majority		40,826	24.80	+20.15
Turnout		1,64,635	63.00	
AAP gain from Independent		Swing	+41.68	

=== 2013 ===
Delhi Assembly elections, 2013: Mundka
Party	Candidate	Votes	%	±%
Independent	Rambir Shokeen	52,564	34.27	
BJP	Master Azad Singh	45,430	29.62	−16.21
AAP	Krishan Kumar	23,872	15.56	
INC	Naresh Kumar	19,157	12.49	−18.92
Independent	Raj Kumar Parihar	2,912	1.90	
BSP	Gurcharan Singh	2,830	1.84	−10.14
DJP	Vijay Kumar Garg	1,397	0.91	
RUC	Alam Khan	860	0.56	
BPC	Karam Chand Lathwal	709	0.46	
AIBSP	Arvind Kataria	552	0.36	
Independent	Jagdish	528	0.34	
SS	Satya Narayan	454	0.30	+0.13
Independent	Reeta	301	0.20	
BSVP	Mukesh Sharma	271	0.18	
RAM	Gauri Shankar	260	0.17	−0.12
RJP	Renu Bharti	193	0.13	
BJD(I)	Meenu	193	0.13	
AIFB	Kamal Goyal	175	0.11	−0.07
NOTA	None	734	0.48	
Majority		7,134	4.65	−9.77
Turnout		153,584	63.28	
Independent gain from BJP		Swing		

=== 2008 ===
Delhi Assembly elections, 2008: Mundka
Party	Candidate	Votes	%	±%
BJP	Manoj Kumar Shokeen	47,355	45.83	
INC	Prem Chander Kaushik	32,458	31.41	
BSP	Jasbir Singh	12,382	11.98	
NCP	Chandi Ram	6,909	6.69	
Independent	Bhagwan Singh	858	0.83	
ABSP	Sharafat Ali	768	0.74	
Independent	Vijay Kumar	555	0.54	
MKUP	Jaideep Singh	350	0.34	
RAM	Nagendra Sharma	297	0.29	
Independent	Md Yasin Khan	251	0.24	
Independent	Prem Narayan	209	0.20	
LPSP	Lal Chand	198	0.19	
Independent	Raj Kumar Parihar	192	0.19	
AIFB	Mahvir	190	0.18	
SS	Vikrant Kapoor	179	0.17	
UPUDF	Md Mehraj	178	0.17	
Majority		14,897	14.42	
Turnout		1,03,329	55.0	
BJP win (new seat)				
