= Devinder Kumar Sehrawat =

Indian politician (born 1965)

Col. Devinder Kumar Sehrawat
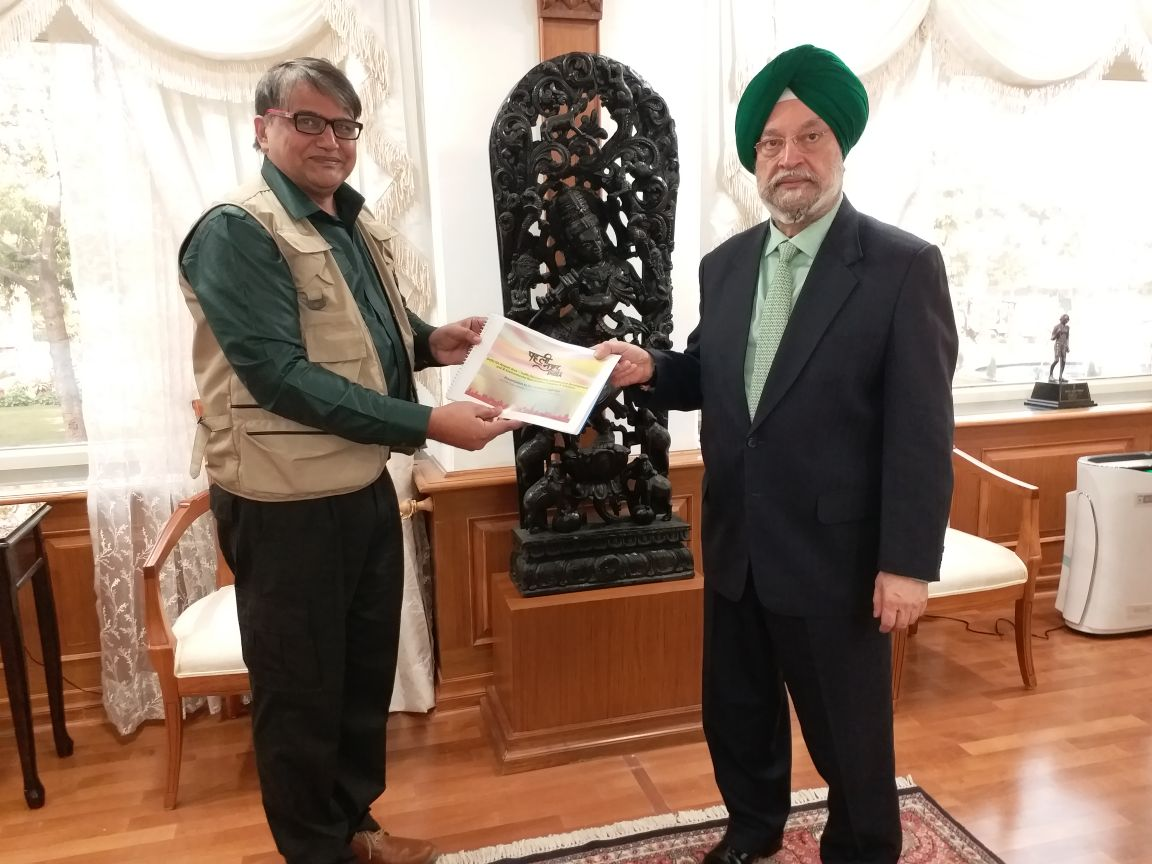
- Left Colonel Devinder Sehrawat and in right Shri Hardeep Puri

Member of Delhi Legislative Assembly
- In office Feb 2015 – Feb 2020
- Preceded by: Sat Prakash Rana
- Succeeded by: Bhupinder Singh Joon
- Constituency: Bijwasan

Personal details
- Born: 30 October 1965 (age 60) New Delhi, India
- Party: Indian National Congress
- Other political affiliations: Aam Aadmi Party, Bharatiya Janata Party
- Spouse: Poonam (wife)
- Children: 1 son & 1 daughter
- Parent: Ram Prakash Sehrawat (father)
- Education: Business Management, BSc
- Alma mater: IIM Ahmedabad & Jawaharlal Nehru University
- Profession: Politician

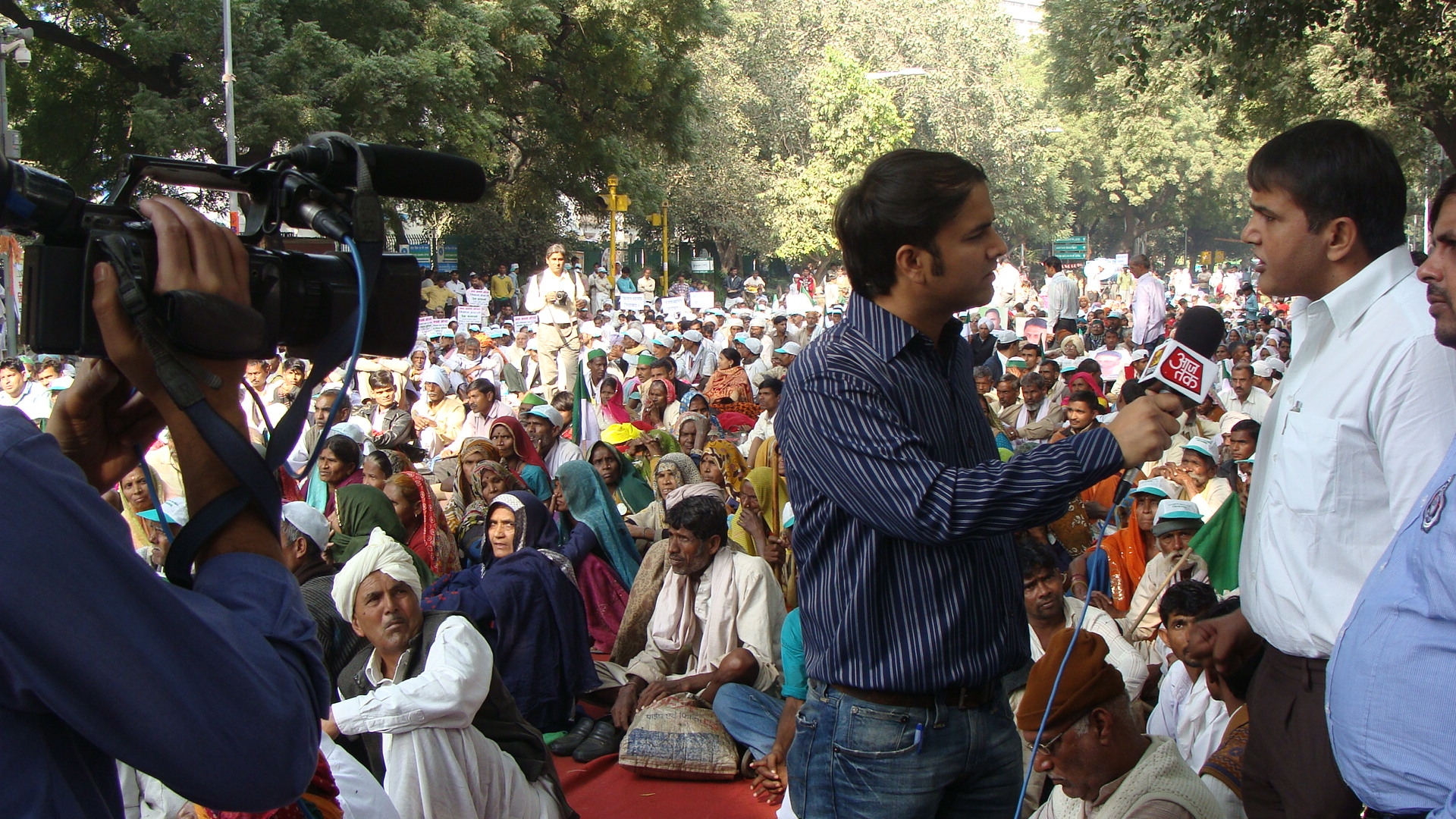
Farmers Rally at Jantar Mantar, Delhi, 25 Nov 2011

Devinder Kumar Sehrawat is a retired colonel of the Indian Armed Forces and a politician, member of the Indian National Congress. He is a farmer leader from the rural belt of Delhi. He was a member of the Sixth Legislative Assembly of Delhi, he represented the Bijwasan constituency of New Delhi.

== Early life and education ==
Devinder Kumar Sehrawat was born in Mahipalpur, Delhi in a jat family. He attended The Air Force School, Subroto Park, Delhi, as a boarding student. He earned a Post Graduate Diploma from the Indian Institute of Management (IIM) Ahmedabad, a Master of Science (MSc) degree from Madras University, and a Bachelor of Science (BSc) from Jawaharlal Nehru University through the National Defence Academy (NDA).

== Military career ==
Devinder Kumar Sehrawat served in the Indian Army for 20 years. He trained at the National Defence Academy (NDA), Pune, where he captained the basketball team and received the book prize for achieving first place in "Overall Common Service Subjects" during his fourth term. Following NDA, he completed his military training at the Indian Military Academy (IMA), Dehradun. At IMA, he earned the Jammu and Kashmir Medal for excelling in "Tactical Training" among his coursemates and held the prestigious position of Academy Under Officer for two terms during his final year.

=== Commission and Early Assignments ===
Sehrawat served in the Indian Army for 20 years. He trained at the NDA in Pune, where he captained the basketball team and excelled academically. He continued his training at the Indian Military Academy (IMA), Dehradun, receiving the Jammu and Kashmir Medal for Tactical Training and serving as academy under officer.

Commissioned into the Infantry in 1987, Sehrawat underwent commando training and specialized in counter-insurgency operations, high-altitude warfare, and logistics. He held key positions, including Deputy Commandant of a Field Ordnance Depot in Udhampur and command of a unit in Kupwara, Jammu and Kashmir, during Operation Parakram. He retired as a colonel.

== Leadership in Farmer Issues ==
Sehrawat has been an advocate for farmers' rights in Delhi, focusing on land acquisition and rural development. His activism includes organizing mass protests, Maha Panchayats, and rallies to address issues such as inadequate compensation for land acquisitions and the lack of ownership rights under the Delhi Land Reforms Act.

Notable movements include:

- Organizing a Maha Panchayat in 2010 to discuss land acquisition for the Indira Gandhi International Airport.
- Leading a farmers’ protest at Jantar Mantar in 2011 to demand better compensation and transparency in land acquisition laws.
- Advocating for amendments to the Land Acquisition, Rehabilitation, and Resettlement Act, 2013, to include farmer-friendly provisions.

== Civil Society and Activism ==
Sehrawat played a key role in the India Against Corruption movement in 2011, which contributed to the push for the Lokpal Bill. He was a founding member of the Aam Aadmi Party (AAP) and served on its national executive committee. He has also worked to preserve Delhi's cultural heritage, including efforts to save the Aravali Ridge and Sultan Garhi structures, and was recognized for his social impact in TOI in March 2013.

He was one of the founder members of the Aam Aadmi Party, AAP and member of its first Executive Committee of the National Council, on formation of the party on 26 November 2012. He held the following responsibilities in the party- Member Land Acquisition Committee, Prabahari State of Haryana.

Efforts to Save the Ridge. He galvanized the villagers in the efforts to save the Aravali Ridge in Vasant Kunj- Mahipalpur-Rangpuri area.

== Political career ==
Sehrawat was elected as Member of Legislative assembly of Delhi in Feb 2015, representing the Bijwasan Constituency. His tenure was marked by initiatives in infrastructure, education, and environmental advocacy:

- Proposing the Citizens Health Safety and Security from Electromagnetic Radiation Due to Mobile Towers Bill, 2015.
- Filing public interest litigations to address waste management and school safety in Delhi.
- Reviving a 400-year-old lake near Vasant Kunj and overseeing the completion of stalled infrastructure projects like the Bijwasan flyover.

In 2019, following the Pulwama attack, Sehrawat resigned from AAP and joined the Bharatiya Janata Party (BJP), where he campaigned for the 2019 Lok Sabha elections.

=== Legislative Achievements ===
He was elected as member of legislative assembly of Delhi in 2015, to represent Bijwasan Constituency:

- He supported the demand of One Rank One Pension, OROP of the Ex-Servicemen of Indian Armed Forces, addressed the Ex Servicemen sitting on Dharna at 'Jantar Mantar', New Delhi on 28 June 2015 and he tabled a resolution in support in support of 'One Rank One Pension', OROP of the veteran community in the Legislative Assembly of Delhi on 25 June 2015. The Government of India, accepted the 'One Rank One Pension' by way of its mention in the president's address to both Houses of Parliament on 9 June 2014.
- Colonel Devinder Sehrawat as member of Legislative Assembly of Delhi, drafted and tabled in the house the 'Citizens Health Safety and Security from Electromagnetic Radiation due to Mobile Towers, Bill 2015.
- In the environmental field, he took up the concerns of the residents of Delhi Airport area regarding 'Waste Management', vide a 'Public Interest Litigation', PIL against SDMC for neglecting waste collection and cleaning of Airport Area.
- He took up the matter of safety of school children of Delhi. After the incidents of death of 2 primary school children, one in Govt School Kapashera and the other in Ryan School in Vasant Kunj. He filed public interest litigation, PIL in the High Court of Delhi, against the negligence of the private school authorities and Government officials and by his personal intervention he got a standard operating procedure issued by the court for the safety of approx. 50 Lakh school children of Delhi

=== Infrastructure development ===
He made a plan and prepared a vision document for development of Bijwasan constituency, which entailed the development of the Delhi Airport area. Infrastructure development plans. Projects in this area were pending for decades, the planned projects for Common Wealth Games, Delhi-2010, had not got implemented. The constituency was one of the most water deficient areas in Delhi. The plan “Pehli Nazar”- The First Look of India, was conceived, with the aim of 'Creating a lasting impression on the foreign visitors' and to safe guard the heath of the residents of Bijwasan Constituency in view of the Use of Ground Water for Drinking Purpose, due to total absence of piped water supply.

Notable Works as MLA

During his tenure as a member of the Legislative Assembly of Delhi, Devinder Kumar Sehrawat undertook several significant infrastructure and development projects in the region. Some of his notable achievements include:

- Infrastructure development:
  - Completion of Northern Bypass: Overseeing the completion of the Northern Bypass from near the CNG Pump on Mahipalpur-Vasant Kunj Road to NH-8 near Aero City Hotel, a project implemented by the Delhi Development Authority at a cost of Rs 90 lakh.
  - Revival of 400-year-old lake: Initiating the revival of a historic lake near Vasant Kunj in the Shankar Vihar Cantonment, with support from the Ministry of Defence.
  - Completion of Bijwasan Flyover and Underpass: Resolving long-standing issues and completing the Bijwasan Flyover and Underpass, which had been stalled for seven years.

=== Urban Development and Public Services ===
  - Removal of Encroachments: Leading efforts to remove encroachments on government school land in Samalka and Gram Sabha land near the DC office, and constructing a 106-room government school and a Baraat Ghar for Kapashera residents.
  - Water Supply: Providing water supply to areas like Raj Nagar, Mahipalpur, Rangpuri Complex, Shahbad Mohammadpur, Dhool Siras, Bamnoli, Bharthal, and Bagdola.
  - Land Allocation: Allocating land for the Dada Bhaiyya Complex in Bijwasan and approving the development of sports complexes in Kapashera and Nangal Dewat.
- Public Amenities:
  - Road Infrastructure: Recarpeting the Mahipalpur-Vasant Kunj Road and installing safety grills on the divider to improve traffic flow.
  - Community Development: Proposing the development of a multi-utility recreation and fitness center, a water body, and a 200-bed hospital in Mahipalpur.

These initiatives significantly improved the quality of life for the residents of the region and showcased Sehrawat's commitment to public service.

He Resigned from Aam Aadmi Party, after Pulwama incident. He joined BJP in May 2019, during Delhi leg of the Lok Sabha elections and actively campaigned for BJP, resulting in second highest margin in Bijwasan constituency amongst the 10 Vidhan Sabha Constituencies under South Delhi Parliamentary seat.

== Posts held ==
| # | From | To | Position | Comments |
|---|---|---|---|---|
| 01 | 2014 | 2019 | Aam Aadmi Party, Member of Legislative Assembly for Bijwasan | |
| 02 | 2021 | 2023 | President in Delhi at Akhil Bhartiya Poorv Sainik Seva Parishad | |

== Honours and recognition ==
- Chief of Army Staff Commendation Card for dedication to Service.
- Awarded best performing MLA of Delhi, during open on Line Survey on internet.
- Awarded environmental and Water resources soldier award by Airport area environment society.
- Netaji Subhash Chander Bose award for environmental preservation work by civil society of Gurugram.
- Recognized by Cooperative ministry of Uttrakahand for service to organic farmers of the state.

== See also ==
- Mahipalpur
- Bijwasan Constituency
- Sixth Legislative Assembly of Delhi
