= Maninder Singh =

Maninder Singh may refer to:

- Maninder Singh (actor), Indian television actor
- Maninder Singh (cricketer), Indian cricket player
- Maninder Singh Dhir, Indian politician
- Maninder Singh (kabaddi), Indian kabaddi player
- Manjinder Singh (general), lieutenant general in the Indian Army
- Maninder Singh (field hockey), Indian field hockey player
