= Praveen Kumar (Delhi politician) =

Indian politician

Member of the Delhi Legislative Assembly for Jangpura
- In office Feb 2015 – 8 February 2025
- Preceded by: Anil Kumar Sharma
- Succeeded by: Tarvinder Singh Marwah

Personal details
- Born: 21 December 1984 (age 41) Bhopal
- Citizenship: Indian
- Party: Aam Aadmi Party
- Parent: P.N.Deshmukh
- Education: B.Sc MBA

Praveen Kumar (born 21 December 1984) is an Indian politician from New Delhi. He is a former member of the 6th Delhi Legislative Assembly and was re-elected to the 7th Delhi Assembly, representing the Aam Aadmi Party from Jangpura Assembly constituency in South Delhi region and South East district of Delhi. It falls under South Delhi Municipal Corporation.

== Allegation ==
=== Office of Profit ===
In March, 2017, a man named Vivek Garg had filed a petition before the President seeking disqualification of 11 AAP lawmakers, including state Transport Minister Kailash Gahlot, claiming that being co-chairpersons of district disaster management authorities in 11 Delhi districts, they were enjoying office of profit. The issue was referred to the Election Commission which gave an opinion in August that holding the office of co-chairperson of a district disaster management authority does not attract disqualification as MLA as there is no remuneration by way of salary, allowances, sitting fee. Nor is there any other facility such as staff car, office space, supporting staff, telephone or residence provided.

=== Petition against distributing oxygen to COVID-19 patients ===
On July 8, the drugs control department had filed complaints under the Drugs and Cosmetics Act before a Dwarka court against BJP MP Gautam Gambhir's foundation and the two AAP MLAs Praveen Kumar and Imran Hussain for allegedly stocking and distributing medical oxygen. Allegations against the Gautam Gambhir Foundation pertain to stocking and distribution of a COVID-19 drug and medical oxygen. The department gave a clean chit to Delhi BJP president Adesh Gupta and Leader of Opposition Ramvir Singh Bidhuri in a private complaint alleging unlawful distribution of medical oxygen by them.

A Bench of Justice Vipin Sanghi and Justice Jasmeet Singh said they could not permit prosecution of good Samaritans for helping society at a time when the authorities had failed to provide oxygen.

== Posts Held ==
#	From	To	Position	Comments
01	2015	Incumbent	Member, Sixth Legislative Assembly of Delhi	

== Electoral performance ==
Delhi Assembly elections, 2020: Jangpura
Party	Candidate	Votes	%	±%
AAP	Praveen Kumar	55,133	50.88	+2.77
BJP	Impreet Singh Bakshi	29,070	32.77	+7.06
INC	Tarvinder Singh Marwah	13,565	15.29	−9.53
NOTA	None of the above	419	0.47	+0.13
BSP	Subhash	247	0.28	−0.13
Majority		16,063	18.18	−4.22
Turnout		88,794	60.66	−3.66
AAP hold		Swing	-4.22	

== See also ==
- Sixth Legislative Assembly of Delhi
- Delhi Legislative Assembly
- Government of India
- Politics of India
- Aam Aadmi Party

State Legislative Assembly
Preceded by ?	Member of the Delhi Legislative Assembly from Jangpura Assembly constituency 2020–	Incumbent
