= Yamuna Vihar Assembly constituency =

Former constituency of the Delhi legislative assembly in India

Coordinates: 28.71°N 77.28°E

Yamuna Vihar
- Former constituency for the Delhi Legislative Assembly

Constituency details
- Country: India
- Region: North India
- State: Delhi
- Established: 1972
- Abolished: 2008

Yamuna Vihar was a constituency of the Delhi Legislative Assembly in northern India. Yamuna Vihar constituency was a part of North East Delhi (Lok Sabha constituency).

The constituency was created pursuant to "Delimitation Order, 1967". Its first election was held in 1972 and it was assigned identification number 25. The constituency ceased to exist in 2008 after the "Delimitation of Parliamentary and Assembly Constituencies Order, 2008" was passed.

== Members of Legislative Assembly ==
Election	Member	Party
1993	Sahab Singh Chauhan	Bharatiya Janata Party
1998	Sahab Singh Chauhan	Bharatiya Janata Party
2003	Sahab Singh Chauhan	Bharatiya Janata Party
