= Bhupinder Singh Joon =

Indian politician

Member of the Delhi Legislative Assembly for Bijwasan
- In office 11 February 2020 – 2025
- Preceded by: Sat Prakash Rana
- Succeeded by: Kailash Gahlot

Personal details
- Party: Bharatiya Janata Party (From 1 February 2025-)
- Other political affiliations: Aam Aadmi Party, Independent
- Education: Birendra Narayan Chakraborty University

Bhupinder Singh Joon is an Indian lawyer and politician from Delhi. He was a member of the Delhi Legislative Assembly.

== Biography ==
Joon studied in Birendra Narayan Chakraborty University. He was elected as a member of the Delhi Legislative Assembly from Bijwasan on 11 February 2020. He defeated his nearest candidate Sat Prakash Rana of Bharatiya Janata Party by 753 votes in the election which is the lowest margin in 2020 Delhi Legislative Assembly election.

Bhupinder Singh Joon resigned from the Aam Aadmi Party on 31 January 2025 ahead of 2025 Delhi Legislative Assembly election and joined Bharatiya Janata Party on 1 February 2025 in the presence of BJP's national vice-president and the in-charge of Delhi Baijayant Panda, and state president Virendra Sachdeva.

== Member of Legislative Assembly (2020 - 2025) ==
Since 2020, he is an elected member of the 7th Delhi Assembly.

Committee assignments of Delhi Legislative Assembly

- Member (2022-2023), Committee on Estimates

== Electoral performance ==
Source:2020 In 2020, Bijwasan legislative assembly constituency had total 2,01,630 electors. Total number of valid vote was 1,24,972. Aam Aadmi Party candidate Bhupinder Singh Joon won and became MLA from this seat. He secured total 57,271 votes. Bharatiya Janata Party candidate Sat Prakash Rana stood second with total 56,518 votes. He lost by 753 votes. This was categorized as the most marginal victory as the number of votes difference was lowest(753).

Delhi Assembly elections, 2020: Bijwasan
Party	Candidate	Votes	%	±%
AAP	Bhupinder Singh Joon	57,271	45.83	−9.16
BJP	Sat Prakash Rana	56,518	45.22	+6.76
INC	Praveen Rana	5,937	4.75	+0.31
NOTA	None of the above	448	0.36	−0.05
Majority		753	0.61	−14.92
Turnout		1,25,097	62.04	−1.38
AAP hold		Swing	-9.16	

State Legislative Assembly
Preceded by ?	Member of the Delhi Legislative Assembly from Bijwasan Assembly constituency 2020–	Incumbent
