= Gajender Drall =

Indian politician

Member of the Delhi Legislative Assembly
- Incumbent
- Assumed office 8 February 2025
- Preceded by: Dharampal Lakra
- Constituency: Mundka

Personal details
- Party: Bharatiya Janata Party

Gajender Drall is an Indian politician from Delhi. He is a member of Bharatiya Janata Party. He has been elected as the Member of the Legislative Assembly representing the Mundka Assembly constituency in 2025 Delhi Legislative Assembly election.

== Political career ==
Drall won the 2025 Delhi Legislative Assembly election from the Mundka Assembly constituency by defeating Jasbir Karala of AAP by a margin of 10,550 votes.

== Electoral performance ==
Delhi Assembly elections, 2025: Mundka
Party	Candidate	Votes	%	±%
BJP	Gajender Drall	89,839	47.07	▲4.70
AAP	Jasbir Karala	79,289	41.54	▼12.24
INC	Dharampal Lakra	10,290	5.39	▲2.36
NOTA	None of the above	1,088	0.30	
Majority		10,550	5.6	▼5.81
Turnout		1,89,765	60.6	▲1.16
BJP gain from AAP		Swing		
