= Jangpura Assembly constituency =

Constituency of the Delhi legislative assembly in India

Coordinates: 28.58°N 77.25°E

Jangpura
- Constituency No. 41 for the Delhi Legislative Assembly

Constituency details
- Country: India
- Region: North India
- State: Delhi
- District: South Delhi
- Lok Sabha constituency: East Delhi
- Reservation: None

Member of Legislative Assembly
- 8th Delhi Legislative Assembly
- Incumbent Tarvinder Singh Marwah
- Party: Bharatiya Janata Party
- Elected year: 2025

Jangpura Assembly constituency is one of the seventy Delhi assembly constituencies of Delhi in northern India. Jangpura assembly constituency is a part of South East Delhi (Lok Sabha constituency). It is a posh neighbourhood in South Delhi district of Delhi divided into Jangpura, Jangpura Extension, Jangpura A and Jangpura B.

== Members of the Legislative Assembly ==
Election	Name	Party
1993	Jag Pravesh Chandra	Indian National Congress
1998	Tarvinder Singh Marwah	Indian National Congress
2003	Tarvinder Singh Marwah	Indian National Congress
2008	Tarvinder Singh Marwah	Indian National Congress
2013	Maninder Singh Dhir	Aam Aadmi Party
2015	Praveen Kumar	Aam Aadmi Party
2020	Praveen Kumar	Aam Aadmi Party
2025	Tarvinder Singh Marwah	Bharatiya Janata Party

== Election results ==
=== 2025 ===
Delhi Assembly elections, 2025: Jangpura
Party	Candidate	Votes	%	±%
BJP	Tarvinder Singh Marwah	38,859	45.44	▲12.67
AAP	Manish Sisodia	38,184	44.65	▼6.23
INC	Farhad Suri	7,350	8.60	▼6.69
NOTA	None of the above	441	0.52	▲0.05
Majority		675	0.79	▼17.39
Turnout		85,511		
BJP hold		Swing		

=== 2020 ===
Delhi Assembly elections, 2020: Jangpura
Party	Candidate	Votes	%	±%
AAP	Praveen Kumar	55,133	50.88	+2.77
BJP	Impreet Singh Bakshi	29,070	32.77	+7.06
INC	Tarvinder Singh Marwah	13,565	15.29	−9.53
NOTA	None of the above	419	0.47	+0.13
BSP	Subhash	247	0.28	−0.13
Majority		16,063	18.18	−4.22
Turnout		88,794	60.66	−3.66
AAP hold		Swing	-4.22	

=== 2015 ===
Delhi Assembly elections, 2015: Jangpura
Party	Candidate	Votes	%	±%
AAP	Praveen Kumar	43,927	48.11	+11.16
BJP	Maninder Singh Dhir	23,477	25.71	+2.10
INC	Tarvinder Singh Marwah	22,662	24.82	−9.96
NOTA	None of the above	314	0.34	−0.35
Majority		20,450	22.40	+20.23
Turnout		91,329	64.30	
AAP hold		Swing	+11.16	

=== 2013 ===
Delhi Assembly elections, 2013: Jangpura
Party	Candidate	Votes	%	±%
AAP	Maninder Singh Dhir	29,701	36.95	
INC	Tarvinder Singh Marwah	27,957	34.78	−22.22
BJP	Pankaj Jain	18,978	23.61	−12.05
JD(U)	Rakesh	1,523	1.89	
NOTA	None	555	0.69	
Majority		1,744	2.17	−19.17
Turnout		80,399	62.30	
AAP gain from INC		Swing		

=== 2008 ===
Delhi Assembly elections, 2008: Jangpura
Party	Candidate	Votes	%	±%
INC	Tarvinder Singh Marwah	37,261	57.00	−11.88
BJP	Manjinder Singh Sirsa	23,310	35.66	+9.08
BSP	Gaje Singh	3,192	4.88	
Majority		13,956	21.34	−20.96
Turnout		65,374	59.60	+8.44
INC hold		Swing	-11.88	

=== 2003 ===
Delhi Assembly elections, 2003: Jangpura
Party	Candidate	Votes	%	±%
INC	Tarvinder Singh Marwah	32,937	68.88	+17.41
BJP	Kuldeep Singh Bhogal	12,710	26.58	−3.28
IND	Rajan Taneja	1,009	2.11	
Majority		20,227	42.30	+21.69
Turnout		47,820	51.16	+1.39
INC hold		Swing	+17.41	

=== 1998 ===
Delhi Assembly elections, 1998: Jangpura
Party	Candidate	Votes	%	±%
INC	Tarvinder Singh Marwah	28,384	51.47	+4.07
BJP	Bir Bahadur	16,465	29.86	−12.66
IND	Tilak Raj Malhotra	8,605	15.60	
Majority		11,919	21.61	+16.73
Turnout		55,144	49.77	−8.75
INC hold		Swing	+4.07	

=== 1993 ===
Delhi Assembly elections, 1993: Jangpura
Party	Candidate	Votes	%	±%
INC	Jag Pravesh Chandra	24,200	47.40	
BJP	Ram Lal Verma	21,709	42.52	
JD	P. Chakraborty	3,382	6.62	
Majority		2,491	4.88	
Turnout		51,052	58.52	
INC win (new seat)				
