= Kailash Gahlot =

Indian politician (born 1974)

Cabinet Minister, Government of Delhi
- In office 14 February 2015 – 17 November 2024
- Lieutenant Governor: Najeeb Jung; Anil Baijal; Vinai Kumar Saxena
- Chief Minister: Arvind Kejriwal; Atishi Marlena
- Ministry and Departments: Finance; Transport; Revenue; Law & Justice; Legislative Affairs; Information & Technology; Administrative Reforms; Planning departments
- Preceded by: President's rule
- Succeeded by: Ashish Sood

Member of the Delhi Legislative Assembly
- In office February 2015 – 17 November 2024
- Preceded by: Ajeet Singh Kharkhari
- Succeeded by: Neelam Pahalwan
- Constituency: Najafgarh

Member of the Delhi Legislative Assembly
- Incumbent
- Assumed office 8 February 2025
- Preceded by: Bhupinder Singh Joon
- Constituency: Bijwasan

Personal details
- Born: 22 July 1974 (age 52) Delhi, India
- Party: Bharatiya Janata Party (2024–present)
- Other political affiliations: Aam Aadmi Party (until 2024)
- Spouse: Moushumi Mishra Gahlot
- Children: 2 daughters
- Education: Sri Venkateswara College (BA); Faculty of Law, University of Delhi (LLB & LLM)
- Profession: Lawyer and Politician

Kailash Gahlot is an Indian politician and lawyer and a member of the Bharatiya Janata Party who had served as the Minister of Transport and Environment in the Delhi government. He was a member of the Legislative Assembly of Delhi, representing the Najafgarh constituency as a member of the Aam Aadmi Party (AAP) until his resignation on 17 November 2024. Gahlot was a cabinet minister in the Arvind Kejriwal-led government, holding multiple key portfolios during his tenure.

On 17 November 2024, Gahlot resigned from his ministerial position and the AAP, citing unfulfilled promises and recent controversies. The following day, he joined the Bharatiya Janata Party (BJP).

== Early life and education ==
Kailash Gahlot was born on 22 July 1974 into a Rajput family of the Gehlot gotra in Sapnavat village. He completed his Bachelor of Arts degree from Sri Venkateswara College, University of Delhi in 1995. He later pursued a Bachelor of Laws and a Master of Laws from the Faculty of Law, University of Delhi in 1995 and 1998, respectively.

Gahlot practiced law in the Delhi High Court and the Supreme Court of India. He served as a member of the Executive Committee of the Delhi High Court Bar Association from 2005 to 2007.

== Political career ==
Gahlot entered politics with the Aam Aadmi Party and was elected as the MLA for the Najafgarh constituency in the 2015 Delhi elections. He served as a member of both the Sixth and Seventh Delhi Legislative Assembly from February 2015 to November 2024. He was elected in 2025 as a BJP candidate.

=== Cabinet Minister ===
Gahlot held several key portfolios in the Delhi government under the Second and Third Kejriwal ministries. These included Transport, Environment, Revenue, Administrative Reforms, Information Technology, Law, Justice and Legislative Affairs, and Finance and Planning.

As Transport Minister, he led the implementation of major initiatives such as the Electric Vehicle Policy, the Pink Pass Scheme for free bus travel for women, and the Mukhyamantri Tirath Yatra Yojana. He also focused on women’s safety in public transport by deploying marshals and increasing the recruitment of women drivers.

Gahlot played a pivotal role in Delhi’s transition to electric buses, overseeing the electrification of bus depots and the addition of over 1,000 e-buses to the city’s fleet, modernizing the capital’s public transport system.

On 17 November 2024, Gahlot resigned from his ministerial position and the Aam Aadmi Party, citing that the party's political ambitions had overtaken its commitment to public welfare. He pointed to unfulfilled promises, including the failure to clean the Yamuna River, which he claimed had become more polluted, as well as controversies surrounding the "Sheeshmahal scam." The following day, he joined BJP, signaling a significant shift in his political career.

Gahlot was elected as MLA from Bijwasan Constituency in 2025 Delhi Assembly Elections.

== Electoral performance ==
Delhi Assembly elections, 2025: Bijwasan
Party	Candidate	Votes	%	±%
BJP	Kailash Gahlot	64,951	49.77	▲4.55
AAP	Surender Bharadwaj	53,675	41.13	▼4.70
INC	Devinder Sehrawat	9,409	7.21	▲2.46
BSP	Kamal Singh	702	0.54	New
NOTA	None of the above	756	0.58	▲0.03
Majority		11,276	8.64	
Turnout		1,30,504		
BJP gain from AAP		Swing	▲4.55	

Delhi Assembly elections, 2020: Najafgarh
Party	Candidate	Votes	%	±%
AAP	Kailash Gahlot	81,507	49.86	▲15.24
BJP	Ajeet Singh Kharkhari	75,276	46.05	▲21.48
INC	Sahab Singh	2,379	1.46	▼3.63
NOTA	None of the above	736	0.45	▲0.12
Majority		6,231	3.81	▲2.84
Turnout		1,63,517	64.93	−4.09
AAP hold		Swing	+15.24	

Delhi Assembly elections, 2015: Najafgarh
Party	Candidate	Votes	%	±%
AAP	Kailash Gahlot	55,598	34.62	+18.77
INLD	Bharat Singh	54,043	33.65	+2.65
BJP	Ajeet Singh Kharkhari	39,462	24.57	−8.70
INC	Jai Kishan Sharma	8,180	5.09	−2.30
BSP	Ram Singh	1,108	4.60	−2.75
NOTA	None	535	0.33	
Majority		1,555	0.97	−5.82
Turnout		1,60,765	69.02	
AAP gain from BJP		Swing	+18.77	

== See also ==
- Aam Aadmi Party
- Delhi Legislative Assembly
- Najafgarh (Delhi Assembly constituency)
- Politics of India
- Sixth Legislative Assembly of Delhi

State Legislative Assembly
Preceded by Ajeet Singh Kharkhari	Member of the Delhi Legislative Assembly from Najafgarh Assembly constituency 2015–	Incumbent
