= Jayender Kumar Dabas =

Indian politician and is councillor

Councillor (Delhi)
- In office 26 April 2017 – 26 December 2023
- Constituency: Rani Khera, Mundka

Chairman, Narela Zone, North MCD
- In office 26 June 2020 – 26 June 2021
- Preceded by: Sunit Chauhan

Member, Delhi Development Authority
- In office 18 June 2018 – 31 December 2018
- Preceded by: Veena Virmani

Member, Standing committee, North MCD
- In office 18 May 2017 – 30 May 2018

Leader of the House, North MCD
- In office 31 July 2017 – 25 May 2018
- Succeeded by: Tilakraj Kataria

President, District Outer Delhi, Bhartiya Janta Party, Delhi Pardesh
- In office 27 October 2014 – 16 December 2016
- Preceded by: Vinay Rawat
- Succeeded by: Vinay Rawat

Personal details
- Born: 1 January 1968 (age 58) Delhi, India
- Party: Bharatiya Janata Party
- Spouse: Sunita Dabas
- Children: 2 sons; Arun Dabas, Tarun Dabas
- Parent: Mahabir Singh (father)
- Profession: Politician

Jayender Kumar Dabas is an Indian politician and ex municipal councillor. He is ex Chairman, Narela Zone, North Delhi Municipal Corporation (NDMC; North DMC). A member of the Bharatiya Janata Party (BJP), he represented Ward 36, Rani Khera, which is in North West Delhi, within the NDMC.

== Early life and education ==
Jayender Kumar Dabas was born on 1 January 1967 in Madanpur Dabas village, North West District of Delhi, to Mahabir Singh, a farmer, and Channo Devi. He was educated to twelfth grade and then completed an industrial training institute (ITI) certificate course at Delhi in 1988.

== Post held ==
He began his socio-political journey as a volunteer in the Rashtriya Swayamsevak Sangh and later worked in the BJP on various posts.

S.No	From	To	Position
01	2023	Present	Loksabha Vistarak West Delhi Lok sabha
02	2020	2021	Chairman, Narela Zone, North MCD
03	2018	2019	Member, Delhi Development Authority
04	2017	2018	Leader of the House, North MCD
05	2017	2018	Member Standing Committee, North MCD
06	2017	2022	Councillor, from ward 36N Rani Khera Of Bharatiya Janata Party (BJP)
07	2014	2016	District President, outer Delhi Bharatiya Janata Party
08	2010	2012	General Secretary, outer Delhi District Bharatiya Janata Party
09	2008	2010	Secretary, Kishan Morcha Delhi State Bharatiya Janata Party
10	2003	2007	General Secretary, Bawana District Bharatiya Janata Party
11	2000	2002	Youth District President, Bawana District Bharatiya Janata Party
12	1992	1994	General Secretary, Bawana Mandal Bharatiya Janata Party
13	1990	1992	Secretary, Kanjhawala Mandal Bharatiya Janata Party

== Electoral politics ==
Jayender Kumar Dabas is a member of the Bharatiya Janata Party (BJP). For his first term as Councillor, he defeated Krishan Rathi of Aam Aadmi Party (AAP) by a margin of 5989 votes in the 2017 Municipal Corporation of Delhi election. Dabas also served as Leader of the House of NMCD from 2017 to 2018, and as a standing committee member for NMCD. He also worked as DDA (Delhi Development Authority) Member. He is Chairman, Narela Zone, NMCD.
