= Acharya Shree Bhikshu Hospital =

Private Hospital in India

- Established: 1996; 30 years ago
- Location: Moti Nagar, New Delhi, India, India; 28°39′43″N 77°08′25″E
- Website: asbh.delhi.gov.in

Acharya Shree Bhikshu Hospital is a government hospital located in Moti Nagar, New Delhi, India. Established in 1996, the hospital is managed by the Government of the National Capital Territory (NCT) of Delhi.

The hospital opened a new block for new mothers and children in November 2023. This block includes pediatricians and gynecologists and has 270 beds. It was constructed by the Public Works Department (PWD) at an estimated cost of around Rs 67.59 crore, as reported by a government official. On 9 September 2019, Delhi Chief Minister Arvind Kejriwal laid the foundation stone for a new hospital block in Moti Nagar.

On 14 December 2023, Delhi Health Minister, Saurabh Bhardwaj made a surprise inspection at four government hospitals in Delhi including Acharya Shree Bhikshu Hospital. During the inspection of Acharya Hospital, Bhardwaj noted that the cleanliness there was extremely poor.

== See also ==
- Safdarjung Hospital
- Dr. Ram Manohar Lohia Hospital
- Sir Ganga Ram Hospital (India)
- Government of Delhi
