= Abdul Rehman (Indian politician) =

Indian politician

Member of the Delhi Legislative Assembly
- In office 12 February 2020 – 10 December 2024
- Preceded by: Mohammad Ishraque
- Succeeded by: Chaudhary Zubair Ahmad
- Constituency: Seelampur

Personal details
- Born: Dasna, Uttar Pradesh, India
- Party: Indian National Congress
- Profession: Politician, Businessman

Abdul Rehman is an Indian politician and is a former member of the Delhi Legislative Assembly. He is a member of the Indian National Congress and represented Seelampur of Delhi.

== Electoral performance ==
Delhi Assembly elections, 2020: Seelampur
Party	Candidate	Votes	%	±%
AAP	Abdul Rehman	72,694	56.05	+4.80
BJP	Kaushal Kumar Mishra	35,619	27.58	+1.27
INC	Chaudhary Mateen Ahmed	20,207	15.61	−5.67
BSP	Mohd. Afzal	352	0.27	−0.29
NOTA	None of the above	311	0.24	−0.05
Majority		37,075	28.47	+4.8
Turnout		1,29,805	71.42	−0.39
AAP hold		Swing	+4.80	

=== 2025 ===
Delhi Assembly elections, 2025: Seelampur
Party	Candidate	Votes	%	±%
AAP	Chaudhary Zubair Ahmad	79,009	59.21	
BJP	Anil Gaur	36,532	27.38	
INC	Abdul Rehman	16,551	12.4	
RPI(A)	Mohd Nazir	107	0.08	
Rashtriya Republican Party	Shabana	177	0.13	
NOTA	None of the above	355	0.27	
Majority		42,477		
Turnout		1,33,440		
AAP hold		Swing		

State Legislative Assembly
Preceded by ?	Member of the Delhi Legislative Assembly from Seelampur Assembly constituency 2020– 2025	Incumbent
