= Ghonda Assembly constituency =

Constituency of the Delhi legislative assembly in India

Coordinates: 28.691°N 77.265°E

Ghonda
- Constituency No. 66 for the Delhi Legislative Assembly

Constituency details
- Country: India
- Region: North India
- State: Delhi
- District: North East Delhi
- Established: 1993
- Reservation: None

Member of Legislative Assembly
- 8th Delhi Legislative Assembly
- Incumbent Ajay Mahawar
- Party: Bhartiya Janata Party
- Elected year: 2025

Ghonda Assembly constituency is one of the seventy Delhi assembly constituencies of Delhi in northern India. Ghonda assembly constituency is a part of North East Delhi (Lok Sabha constituency).

== Members of the Legislative Assembly ==
Election	Name	Party
1993	Lal Bihari Tiwari	Bharatiya Janata Party
1998	Bhisham Sharma	Indian National Congress
2003	Bhisham Sharma	Indian National Congress
2008	Sahab Singh Chauhan	Bharatiya Janata Party
2013	Sahab Singh Chauhan	Bharatiya Janata Party
2015	Shri Dutt Sharma	Aam Aadmi Party
2020	Ajay Mahawar	Bharatiya Janata Party
2025	Ajay Mahawar	Bharatiya Janata Party

== Election results ==
=== 2025 ===
Delhi Assembly elections, 2025: Ghonda
Party	Candidate	Votes	%	±%
BJP	Ajay Mahawar	79,987	56.96	▼0.59
AAP	Gaurav Sharma	53,929	38.41	▲0.82
INC	Bheeshma Sharma	4,883	3.48	▼0.38
BSP	Sunder Lohiya	454	0.32	
Majority		26,058	18.55	
Turnout		1,40,420	61.03	
BJP hold		Swing		

=== 2020 ===
Delhi Assembly elections, 2020: Ghonda
Party	Candidate	Votes	%	±%
BJP	Ajay Mahawar	81,797	57.55	+18.57
AAP	Shri Dutt Sharma	53,427	37.59	−7.36
INC	Bhisham Sharma	5,484	3.86	−10.08
NOTA	None of the above	512	0.36	0.00
Majority		28,370	19.95	+13.98
Turnout		1,42,191	63.94	−2.90
BJP gain from AAP		Swing	+18.57	

=== 2015 ===
Delhi Assembly elections, 2015: Ghonda
Party	Candidate	Votes	%	±%
AAP	Shri Dutt Sharma	60,906	44.95	+25.44
BJP	Sahab Singh Chauhan	52,813	38.98	−0.27
INC	Bhisham Sharma	18,892	13.94	−15.46
BSP	Ranjeet Singh Chaudhary	1,314	0.96	−4.12
JD(U)	Altaf Hussain	770	0.56	−3.13
SS	Naveen Tiwari	129	0.09	N/A
NOTA	None of the above	500	0.36	−0.09
Majority		8,093	5.97	−3.88
Turnout		1,35,586	66.86	
AAP gain from BJP		Swing	+25.31	

=== 2013 ===
Delhi Assembly elections, 2013: Ghonda
Party	Candidate	Votes	%	±%
BJP	Sahab Singh Chauhan	47,531	39.25	+0.79
INC	Bheeshma Sharma	35,599	29.40	−8.42
AAP	Dataram	23,621	19.51	
BSP	Naresh Chand Rathore	6,155	5.08	−18.64
JD(U)	Rohtash Kumar	4,464	3.69	
Independent	Kiran Pal Singh	1,857	1.53	
LPSP	Jai Prakash Singh	264	0.22	
Proutist Bloc	Aflatoon	225	0.19	
RLD	Waseem	217	0.18	
IJP	Kiran Singh	131	0.11	
JKNPP	Md Nazir	129	0.11	
BSMM	Mohinder Pal Singh	109	0.09	
Socialist Party (India)	Rajiv Kumar	86	0.07	
Rashtriya Janmorcha	Padam Chand	84	0.07	
Janshoshit Samaj	Ramesh Chand	77	0.06	
NOTA	None	549	0.45	
Majority		11,932	9.85	+9.21
Turnout		121,139	65.54	
BJP hold		Swing	+0.79	

=== 2008 ===
Major Boundary Changes(Yamuna Vihar constituency merged with Ghonda)

Delhi Assembly elections, 2008: Ghonda
Party	Candidate	Votes	%	±%
BJP	Shahab Singh Chauhan	35,226	38.46	+14.73
INC	Bheeshma Sharma	34,646	37.82	−10.41
BSP	Rohtash Kumar	21,724	23.72	+1.32
Majority		580	0.64	−23.86
Turnout		91,596	57.5	−0.97
BJP hold		Swing	+14.73	

=== 2003 ===
Delhi Assembly elections, 2003: Ghonda
Party	Candidate	Votes	%	±%
INC	Bheeshma Sharma	26,785	48.23	−2.66
BJP	B D Sharma	13,177	23.73	−5.96
BSP	Rohtash Kumar	12,439	22.40	+17.21
NCP	Sunder Lal	829	1.49	
JPJD	Hari Ram	528	0.95	
Independent	Rajendra Kumar	392	0.71	
SP	Surinder Gautam	324	0.58	+0.22
Independent	Anil Kumar Tiwari	287	0.52	
Independent	Prem Singh Rawat	243	0.44	
IJP	Ram Kishan	241	0.43	
Independent	Amar Singh	103	0.19	
Independent	Ombir Singh	92	0.17	
Loktantrik Samajwadi	Dr Bishwas Sandilya	63	0.11	−0.55
Independent	M Iqbal	32	0.06	
Majority		13,608	24.50	+3.30
Turnout		55,535	58.47	+11.02
INC hold		Swing	-2.66	

=== 1998 ===
Delhi Assembly elections, 1998: Ghonda
Party	Candidate	Votes	%	±%
INC	Bheeshma Sharma	25,014	50.89	+19.64
BJP	Sarvesh Sharma	14,594	29.69	−19.11
BSP	Jai Pal Singh	2,551	5.19	+1.62
Independent	Ashok Kumar	1,539	3.13	
Independent	Nathu Singh	1,479	3.01	
Independent	Naresh Chand	1,148	2.34	
Independent	Manoj	689	1.40	
JD	Raj Kumar Bhati	646	1.31	−7.53
Loktantrik Samajwadi	Ved Prakash	323	0.66	
Independent	Puran Singh Sajwan	300	0.61	
SS	Vijender Kumar Sharma	272	0.55	
SP	Napal Yadav	179	0.36	−0.47
JP	Mangal Singh	148	0.30	−0.40
Independent	Babu Khan	92	0.19	
RPI	Mukesh Sharma	81	0.16	
KMM	Awani Kumar Tiwari	45	0.09	
Independent	Bedi Singh	35	0.07	
IC(S)	Ram Shankar	22	0.04	
Majority		10,420	21.20	−3.65
Turnout		49,157	47.45	−18.15
INC hold		Swing	+19.64	

=== 1993 ===
Delhi Assembly elections, 1993: Ghonda
Party	Candidate	Votes	%	±%
BJP	Lal Behari Tiwari	21,614	48.80	
INC	Dhiraj Singh	13,841	31.25	
JD	Balraj Singh	3,915	8.84	
BSP	Kumarji Lal Rajoria	1,583	3.57	
Independent	Jai Prakash Sharma	1,301	2.94	
SP	Surinder Gautam	368	0.83	
JP	Pratap Singh Bisht	311	0.70	
Independent	Sudan Singh	285	0.64	
Independent	Mangal Singh	181	0.41	
Independent	Ziley Singh	150	0.34	
Independent	Om Prakash	121	0.27	
Independent	Madan Mohan	116	0.26	
DBP	Harish Chauhan	108	0.24	
BKD	Ram Lal Tanwar	92	0.21	
Doordarshi Party	Vijay	91	0.21	
Independent	Rajesh Sharma	82	0.19	
Independent	Raj Kumar	71	0.16	
Independent	Gulvir Singh	40	0.09	
Independent	Aashe Ram Sharma	13	0.03	
AIFB	Joginder Prasad	6	0.01	
Majority		7,773	17.55	
Turnout		44,289	65.60	
BJP win (new seat)				
