= Mohammad Ishraque =

Indian politician

MLA, Sixth Legislative Assembly of Delhi
- In office 2015–2020
- Preceded by: Chaudhary Mateen Ahmed
- Succeeded by: Abdul Rehman
- Constituency: Seelampur

Personal details
- Born: 14 July 1961 (age 65) Hapur
- Party: Indian National Congress
- Parent: Noor Ahmed (father)
- Education: Madarsa
- Profession: Politician, businessperson

Mohammad Ishraque is an Indian politician and a member of the Sixth Legislative Assembly of Delhi in India. He represents the Seelampur constituency of New Delhi and is a member of the Indian National Congress.

== Early life and education ==
Mohammad Ishraque was born in Hapur. He has not received any formal education and has attended Madrasa till fifth grade.

== Political career ==
Mohammad Ishraque has been an MLA for one term. He represented the Seelampur constituency and is a member of the Aam Aadmi Party.

== Posts held ==
#	From	To	Position	Comments
01	Feb 2015	Feb 2020	Member, Sixth Legislative Assembly of Delhi	

== See also ==
- Aam Aadmi Party
- Delhi Legislative Assembly
- Government of India
- Politics of India
- Seelampur (Delhi Assembly constituency)
- Sixth Legislative Assembly of Delhi
