= Harish Khurana =

Indian politician

Member of Delhi Legislative Assembly
- Incumbent
- Assumed office 8 February 2025
- Preceded by: Shiv Charan Goel
- Constituency: Moti Nagar

Personal details
- Born: 1974 (age 50–51); Delhi, India
- Political party: Bharatiya Janata Party
- Spouse: Dimple Khurana
- Children: Parth Khurana

Harish Khurana is an Indian politician from Bharatiya Janata Party from Delhi. He was elected as a Member of the Legislative Assembly in the 8th Delhi Assembly from Moti Nagar Assembly constituency. He is a Member of the Bharatiya Janata Party.

Harish Khurana is the son of Delhi third Chief Minister Madan Lal Khurana.

== Early life and education ==
Harish Khurana was born and raised in Delhi, he belongs to a political family of Madan Lal Khurana, who served as the third chief minister of Delhi. He completed his schooling from DAV Public School, Sahibabad and pursued bachelor's in commerce from Ramjas College in University of Delhi in 1995.

== Career ==
He was actively involved in student politics during his college time, where he joined Akhil Bharatiya Vidyarthi Parishad.
