= Rambir Shokeen =

Former MLA from Mundka, Delhi

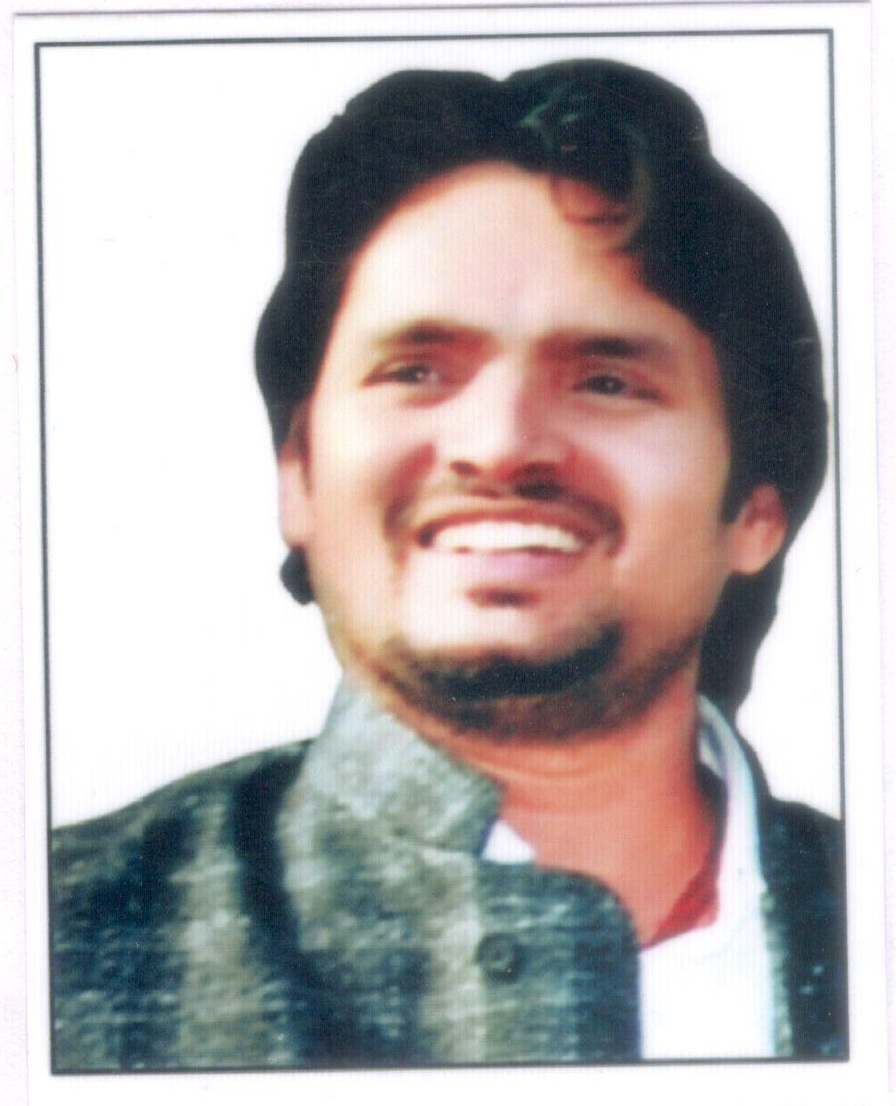

MLA from Mundka Assembly constituency
- In office 2013–2018

Personal details
- Born: 1979 (age 46–47) Delhi, India
- Spouse: Reeta

Rambir Shokeen (Hindi: रामबीर शौकीन) is an Indian politician, He was elected as a Member of the Delhi Legislative Assembly from Mundka constituency in 2013 as an Independent candidate.

== Career ==
According to the Delhi Police, he was a relative and close aide of gangster Neeraj Bawana and was declared a proclaimed offender in a MCOCA case in 2015. He was arrested with arms and ammunition in 2016 and escaped from the Uttar Pradesh Police custody in 2018. After two years on the run, he was again arrested in 2020.

In 2023, he was acquitted of the charges of MCOCA and sentenced to four months of jail for ignoring court summons.

In 2024, the Rouse Avenue district court acquitted him of the Arms Act case citing lack of evidence.
