= Maninder Singh Dhir =

Indian politician (1952–2018)

6th Speaker of Delhi Legislative Assembly
- In office 3 January 2014 – 23 February 2015
- Lieutenant Governor: Najeeb Jung
- Deputy: Bandana Kumari
- Preceded by: Yoganand Shastri
- Succeeded by: Ram Niwas Goel

Member of Delhi Legislative Assembly
- In office 2013–2015
- Preceded by: Tarvinder Singh Marwah
- Succeeded by: Praveen Kumar
- Constituency: Jangpura

Personal details
- Born: 20 April 1952 Delhi, India
- Died: 17 September 2018 (aged 66)
- Party: Aam Aadmi Party
- Other political affiliations: Bharatiya Janata Party

Maninder Singh Dhir (20 April 1952 – 17 September 2018) was an Indian politician who was a member of Bharatiya Janata and Aam Aadmi Party.

Dhir was Speaker of the Delhi Legislative Assembly between December 2013 and February 2014. He was elected to the assembly from Jangpura constituency on an Aam Aadmi Party ticket.

In November 2014, he left AAP and joined BJP on 21 November 2014.
