= Bijwasan Assembly constituency =

Legislative assembly seat in Delhi

Coordinates: 28.536°N 77.054°E

Bijwasan
- Constituency No. 36 for the Delhi Legislative Assembly

Constituency details
- Country: India
- Region: North India
- State: Delhi
- District: South Delhi
- Established: 2008
- Reservation: None

Member of Legislative Assembly
- 8th Delhi Legislative Assembly
- Incumbent Kailash Gahlot
- Party: Bharatiya Janata Party
- Elected year: 2025

Bijwasan Assembly constituency is one of the 70 Delhi Legislative Assembly constituencies in Delhi. This constituency covers part of Bharthal, Dhulsiras, Vasant Kunj, Mahipalpur, Rangpuri, Nangal Dewat, Bijwasan, Samalkha, Bamnauli, Kapashera, Shahbad Mohammadpur, Rajnagar, Part of Dwarka, Delhi|Dwarka.

== Overview ==
Present geographical structure of Bijwasan constituency came into existence in 2008 as a part of the implementation of the recommendations of the Delimitation Commission of India constituted in 2002. Bijwasan is part of South Delhi Lok Sabha constituency along with nine other Assembly segments, namely, Sangam Vihar, Ambedkar Nagar, Chhatarpur, Deoli, Kalkaji, Tughlakabad, Palam, Badarpur and Mehrauli.

== Members of the Legislative Assembly ==
Election	Name	Party
2008	Sat Prakash Rana	Bharatiya Janata Party
2013	Sat Prakash Rana	Bharatiya Janata Party
2015	Devinder Sehrawat	Aam Aadmi Party
2020	Bhupinder Singh Joon	Aam Aadmi Party
2025	Kailash Gahlot	Bharatiya Janata Party

== Election results ==
=== 2025 ===
Delhi Assembly elections, 2025: Bijwasan
Party	Candidate	Votes	%	±%
BJP	Kailash Gahlot	64,951	49.77	▲4.55
AAP	Surender Bharadwaj	53,675	41.13	▼4.70
INC	Devinder Sehrawat	9,409	7.21	▲2.46
BSP	Kamal Singh	702	0.54	New
NOTA	None of the above	756	0.58	▲0.03
Majority		11,276	8.64	
Turnout		1,30,504		
BJP gain from AAP		Swing	▲4.55	

=== 2020 ===
Source:2020 In 2020, Bijwasan legislative assembly constituency had total 2,01,630 electors. Total number of valid vote was 1,24,972. Aam Aadmi Party candidate Bhupinder Singh Joon won and became MLA from this seat. He secured total 57,271 votes. Bharatiya Janata Party candidate Sat Prakash Rana stood second with total 56,518 votes. He lost by 753 votes. This was categorized as the most marginal victory as the number of votes difference was lowest(753).

Delhi Assembly elections, 2020: Bijwasan
Party	Candidate	Votes	%	±%
AAP	Bhupinder Singh Joon	57,271	45.83	−9.16
BJP	Sat Prakash Rana	56,518	45.22	+6.76
INC	Praveen Rana	5,937	4.75	+0.31
NOTA	None of the above	448	0.36	−0.05
Majority		753	0.61	−14.92
Turnout		1,25,097	62.04	−1.38
AAP hold		Swing	-9.16	

=== 2015 ===
Source:2015

Delhi Assembly elections, 2015: Bijwasan
Party	Candidate	Votes	%	±%
AAP	Devinder Kumar Sehrawat	65,006	54.99	+22.67
BJP	Sat Prakash Rana	45,470	38.46	+3.81
INC	Vijay Singh Lochav	5,258	4.44	−13.06
BSP	Yogesh Gaur	641	0.54	−11.06
INLD	Pankaj Kumar	421	0.35	N/A
NOTA	None of the above	496	0.41	−0.25
Majority		19,536	16.53	+14.21
Turnout		1,18,288	63.42	
AAP gain from BJP		Swing	+22.67	

=== 2013 ===
Source:2003

Delhi Assembly elections, 2013: Bijwasan
Party	Candidate	Votes	%	±%
BJP	Sat Prakash Rana	35,988	34.65	−6.68
AAP	Devinder Sehrawat	33,574	32.32	
INC	Vijay Singh Lochav	18,173	17.50	−20.81
BSP	Narender Rana	12,053	11.60	−7.24
SP	Surender Bhardwaj	2,370	2.28	
NOTA	None	688	0.66	
Majority		2,414	2.32	−0.70
Turnout		103,931	63.15	
BJP hold		Swing	-6.68	

=== 2008 ===
Source:2008

Delhi Assembly elections, 2008: Bijwasan
Party	Candidate	Votes	%	±%
BJP	Sat Prakash Rana	27,427	41.33	
INC	Vijay Singh Lochav	25,422	38.31	
BSP	Vinod Kumar Yadav	12,506	18.84	
Independent	Harinder Rana	642	0.97	
LJP	Suresh Chand	370	0.56	
Majority		2,005	3.02	
Turnout		66,367	59.10	
BJP win (new seat)				
