= Sahab Singh Chauhan =

Indian politician (1950–2018)

Member of the Delhi Legislative Assembly
- In office 2008-2014
- Constituency: Ghonda

Member of the Delhi Legislative Assembly
- In office 1993-2008
- Constituency: Yamuna Vihar

Personal details
- Born: 10 January 1950 Village Badarkha, Distt. Bulandshahr (U.P.), India
- Died: 16 - 08 - 2018 Yamuna Vihar Delhi
- Party: BJP
- Spouse: Indrawati Singh
- As of 1 April, 2010

Sahab Singh Chauhan (10 January 1950 – 16 August 2018) was an Indian politician from Bharatiya Janata Party. He was elected to Delhi Legislative Assembly from Yamuna Vihar constituency in the First, Second, Third and from Ghonda constituency in the Fourth and Fifth Delhi Assembly. He lost to Shri Dutt Sharma of the Aam Aadmi Party by around 8000 votes in the 2015 elections.

He also served as the President of the Ghonda Zone, BJP from 1981 to 1987, Secretary of the Shahdara district from 1988 to 1991, General Secretary of the North East Delhi district from 1991 to 1993, and vice-president of the North East Delhi district.
