= Dharampal Lakra =

Indian politician

Member of the Delhi Legislative Assembly for Mundka
- In office Feb 2020 – Feb 2025
- Preceded by: Sukhbir Singh Dalal
- Succeeded by: Gajender Drall

Personal details
- Party: Indian National Congress

Dharampal Lakra is an Indian politician from Delhi. In February 2020 he was elected to the Seventh Legislative Assembly of Delhi, representing the Mundka constituency. He was a member of the Aam Aadmi Party (AAP).

== Political career ==
Lakra was previously a local office bearer of the Indian National Congress, which he quit and joined the AAP in 2014.

== Personal life ==
Lakra is a businessman from Mundka. He has described himself as an agriculturalist and a member of the Food Corporation of India. In the 2020 legislative assembly election, he was noted as the wealthiest candidate with a declared wealth of Rupees 300 crore.

== Electoral performance ==
=== 2025 ===
Delhi Assembly elections, 2025: Mundka
Party	Candidate	Votes	%	±%
BJP	Gajender Drall	89,839	47.07	▲4.70
AAP	Jasbir Karala	79,289	41.54	▼12.24
INC	Dharampal Lakra	10,290	5.39	▲2.36
NOTA	None of the above	1,088	0.30	
Majority		10,550	5.6	▼5.81
Turnout		1,89,765	60.6	▲1.16
BJP gain from AAP		Swing		

Delhi Assembly elections, 2020: Mundka
Party	Candidate	Votes	%	±%
AAP	Dharampal Lakra	90,293	53.78	−3.44
BJP	Azad Singh	71,135	42.37	+9.95
INC	Naresh Kumar	5,082	3.03	−5.14
NOTA	None of the above	903	0.54	+0.19
SBP	Chetram	273	0.16	N/A
Majority		19,158	11.41	−13.39
Turnout		1,67,208	59.44	−3.56
AAP hold		Swing	-3.44	

State Legislative Assembly
Preceded by Sukhbir Singh Dalal	Member of the Delhi Legislative Assembly from Mundka Assembly constituency 2020– 2025	Succeeded by Gajender Drall
