= Ajay Mahawar =

Indian politician

Member of the Delhi Legislative Assembly
- Incumbent
- Assumed office 16 February 2020
- Preceded by: Shri Dutt Sharma
- Constituency: Ghonda

Personal details
- Political party: Bhartiya Janata Party
- Parent: J.P. Mahawar
- Profession: Businesses

Ajay Mahawar is an Indian politician from Delhi. He is a member of the Delhi Legislative Assembly representing the Bharatiya Janata Party from Ghonda Assembly constituency.

== Early life and education ==
Ajay Mahawar is from Ghonda, North East Delhi District. He is the son of J.P. Mahawar. He completed his M.A. in political science in 2015 at Janardan Rai Nagar Rajasthan Vidyapeeth University, Udaipur, Rajasthan.

== Career ==
Mahawar won from Ghonda Assembly constituency representing the Bharatiya Janata Party in the 2025 Delhi Legislative Assembly election. He polled 79.987 votes and defeated his nearest rival, Gaurav Sharma of the Aam Aadmi Party, by a margin of 26,058 votes. He first became MLA winning the 2020 Delhi Legislative Assembly election.

== Electoral performance ==
Delhi Assembly elections, 2020: Ghonda
| Party | Candidate | Votes | % | ±% |
|---|---|---|---|---|
| BJP | Ajay Mahawar | 81,797 | 57.55 | +18.57 |
| AAP | Shri Dutt Sharma | 53,427 | 37.59 | −7.36 |
| INC | Bhisham Sharma | 5,484 | 3.86 | −10.08 |
| NOTA | None of the above | 512 | 0.36 | 0.00 |
| Majority | | 28,370 | 19.95 | +13.98 |
| Turnout | | 1,42,191 | 63.94 | −2.90 |
| BJP gain from AAP | | Swing | +18.57 | |
