= Seelampur Assembly constituency =

Constituency of the Delhi legislative assembly in India

Coordinates: 28.694°N 77.258°E

Seelampur
- Constituency No. 65 for the Delhi Legislative Assembly

Constituency details
- Country: India
- Region: North India
- State: Delhi
- District: North East Delhi
- Lok Sabha constituency: North East Delhi
- Total electors: 1,82,117
- Reservation: None

Member of Legislative Assembly
- 8th Delhi Legislative Assembly
- Incumbent Chaudhary Zubair Ahmad
- Party: Aam Aadmi Party
- Elected year: 2025

Seelampur Assembly constituency is a Delhi Legislative Assembly constituency in Delhi. It is a part of the North East Delhi Lok Sabha constituency. Seelampur was established to relocate a population displaced following the demolition of their homes in North and Central Delhi during the Emergency (India).

== Members of the Legislative Assembly ==
Election	Name	Party
1993	Chaudhary Mateen Ahmed	Janata Dal
1998	Chaudhary Mateen Ahmed	Independent
2003	Chaudhary Mateen Ahmed	Indian National Congress
2008	Chaudhary Mateen Ahmed	Indian National Congress
2013	Chaudhary Mateen Ahmed	Indian National Congress
2015	Mohammad Ishraque	Aam Aadmi Party
2020	Abdul Rehman	Aam Aadmi Party
2025	Chaudhary Zubair Ahmad	Aam Aadmi Party

== Election results ==
=== 2025 ===
Delhi Assembly elections, 2025: Seelampur
Party	Candidate	Votes	%	±%
AAP	Chaudhary Zubair Ahmad	79,009	59.21	
BJP	Anil Gaur	36,532	27.38	
INC	Abdul Rehman	16,551	12.4	
RPI(A)	Mohd Nazir	107	0.08	
Rashtriya Republican Party	Shabana	177	0.13	
NOTA	None of the above	355	0.27	
Majority		42,477		
Turnout		1,33,440		
AAP hold		Swing		

=== 2020 ===
Delhi Assembly elections, 2020: Seelampur
Party	Candidate	Votes	%	±%
AAP	Abdul Rehman	72,694	56.05	+4.80
BJP	Kaushal Kumar Mishra	35,619	27.58	+1.27
INC	Chaudhary Mateen Ahmed	20,207	15.61	−5.67
BSP	Mohd. Afzal	352	0.27	−0.29
NOTA	None of the above	311	0.24	−0.05
Majority		37,075	28.47	+4.8
Turnout		1,29,805	71.42	−0.39
AAP hold		Swing	+4.80	

=== 2015 ===
Delhi Assembly elections, 2015: Seelampur
Party	Candidate	Votes	%	±%
AAP	Mohammad Ishraque	57,302	51.25	+38.26
BJP	Sanjay Jain	29,415	26.31	+1.55
INC	Chaudhary Mateen Ahmed	23,791	21.28	−25.24
BSP	Sandeep Chaudhary	629	0.56	−12.81
NOTA	None of the above	329	0.29	−0.26
Majority		27,887	24.94	+3.18
Turnout		1,11,844	71.81	
AAP gain from INC		Swing	+25.64	

=== 2013 ===
Delhi Assembly elections, 2013: Seelampur
Party	Candidate	Votes	%	±%
INC	Chaudhary Mateen Ahmed	46,452	46.52	−8.13
BJP	Kaushal Kumar Mishra	24,724	24.76	+0.14
BSP	Abdul Rehman	13,352	13.37	−2.00
AAP	Masood Ali Khan	12,969	12.99	
PECP	Nazrin Naaz	635	0.64	
Independent	Mohd. Hasnain	571	0.57	
SP	Bashiruddin	472	0.47	−0.74
Independent	Sarfaraj	120	0.12	
NOTA	None	550	0.55	
Majority		21,728	21.76	+20.75
Turnout		99,864	68.50	
INC hold		Swing	-8.13	

=== 2008 ===
Delhi Assembly elections, 2008: Seelampur
Party	Candidate	Votes	%	±%
INC	Chaudhary Mateen Ahmad	47,820	54.65	−7.99
BJP	Sita Ram Gupta	21,546	24.62	+1.88
BSP	Hazi Afzzal	13,445	15.37	
SP	Masood Ali Khan	1,062	1.21	+1.06
RJD	Mohd Badrul Haq	904	1.03	
JD(S)	Mohd Yusuf	777	0.89	+8.89
Independent	Hafiz Ahmed	467	0.53	
Independent	Ayyub Ali	314	0.36	
RPI(A)	Saleem Khan	226	0.26	
Independent	Md Sabir Siddiqi	209	0.24	
Independent	Aftab Ahmad	198	0.23	
BSP(K)	Nasim Ahmad Hashmi	192	0.22	
LJP	Shakir Hussain	169	0.19	
Independent	Viqar Ahmad Khan	87	0.10	
Independent	Shakila Begum	83	0.09	
Majority		979	1.01	−38.89
Turnout		97,894	58.0	+2.19
INC hold		Swing	-7.99	

=== 2003 ===
Delhi Assembly elections, 2003: Seelampur
Party	Candidate	Votes	%	±%
INC	Chaudhary Mateen Ahmed	34,085	62.64	+49.04
BJP	Sanjay Kumar Jain	12,373	22.74	+2.78
JD(S)	Haji Ikram Hasan	5,323	9.78	
NLP	Mohd Yusuf	1,060	1.95	
Independent	Haider Ali	512	0.94	
Independent	M Hasnain	288	0.53	
SS	Kanhya Lal Otwal	252	0.46	
INL	Mohd Yusuf	212	0.39	
SP	Shafiq	79	0.15	
JKNPP	Sudesh Kumari	73	0.13	
Indian Federal Democratic Party	Pushpa	63	0.12	
RPD	Zahoor Khan	53	0.10	
JD(U)	Mohd Sultan	40	0.07	
Majority		21,712	39.90	+10.18
Turnout		54,413	55.81	+0.93
INC gain from Independent		Swing	+49.04	

=== 1998 ===
Delhi Assembly elections, 1998: Seelampur
Party	Candidate	Votes	%	±%
Independent	Ch Mateen Ahmad	27,376	49.68	
BJP	Data Ram	11,001	19.96	−18.88
INC	Salauddin	7,497	13.60	−2.65
BSP	Mohd Nahid	2,317	4.20	+3.73
JD	Sultan Ahmad	2,148	3.90	−38.64
NLP	Mohd Yusuf	1,411	2.56	
Independent	Abdul Khalid	1,119	2.03	
Independent	Jagdish	829	1.50	
RAS	Dilshad Khan	299	0.54	
Independent	Nisar Ahmed Khan	267	0.48	
SJP(R)	Kamre Alam	195	0.35	
Lok Shakti	Rasid	176	0.32	
RJD	Haji Mohd Umar	160	0.29	
Independent	Sabir Khan	103	0.19	
Independent	Mukesh Kumar	76	0.14	
Loktantrik Samajwadi	Narender Kumar Sharma	55	0.10	
RMMP	Abdul Khalik	41	0.07	
IC(S)	Komal Prasad	40	0.07	
Majority		16,375	29.72	+26.02
Turnout		55,110	54.88	−16.33
Independent gain from JD		Swing		

=== 1993 ===
Delhi Assembly elections, 1993: Seelampur
Party	Candidate	Votes	%	±%
JD	Ch Mateen Ahmad	16,518	42.54	
BJP	Jai Kishan Dassgupta	15,080	38.84	
INC	Sultan Ahmed	6,309	16.25	
JP	Nand Kishore Kashyap	244	0.63	
CPI	Ayub Ali Khan	194	0.50	
BSP	Vijay Singh	183	0.47	
BKD	Gurudayal	99	0.25	
SP	Zahiruddin	60	0.15	
Independent	Mansab	46	0.12	
ESP	Asha Devi	46	0.12	
Doordarshi Party	Sanjay Sharma	23	0.06	
Independent	Hashimi M Y	18	0.05	
Independent	Kanwar Nazar Mohd Chauhan	6	0.02	
Majority		1,438	3.70	
Turnout		38,826	71.21	
JD hold		Swing		
