= Gandhi Nagar, Delhi Assembly constituency =

Constituency of the Delhi legislative assembly in India

Coordinates: 28.666°N 77.274°E

Gandhi Nagar
- Constituency No. 61 for the Delhi Legislative Assembly

Constituency details
- Country: India
- Region: North India
- State: Delhi
- District: East Delhi
- Reservation: None

Member of Legislative Assembly
- 8th Delhi Legislative Assembly
- Incumbent Arvinder Singh Lovely
- Party: BJP
- Elected year: 2025

Gandhi Nagar Assembly constituency is one of the 70 Delhi Legislative Assembly constituencies of Delhi in northern India. Gandhi Nagar assembly constituency is a part of East Delhi (Lok Sabha constituency).

== Members of the Legislative Assembly ==
| Election | Name | Party |
|---|---|---|
| 1993 | Darshan Kumar Bahl | Bharatiya Janata Party |
| 1998 | Arvinder Singh Lovely | Indian National Congress |
| 2003 | Arvinder Singh Lovely | Indian National Congress |
| 2008 | Arvinder Singh Lovely | Indian National Congress |
| 2013 | Arvinder Singh Lovely | Indian National Congress |
| 2015 | Anil Kumar Bajpai | Aam Aadmi Party |
| 2020 | Anil Kumar Bajpai | Bharatiya Janata Party |
| 2025 | Arvinder Singh Lovely | Bharatiya Janata Party |

== Election results ==
=== 2025 ===
Delhi Assembly elections, 2025: Gandhi Nagar
| Party | Candidate | Votes | % | ±% |
|---|---|---|---|---|
| BJP | Arvinder Singh Lovely | 56,858 | 53.94 | ▲11.30 |
| AAP | Naveen Chaudhary | 44,110 | 41.85 | ▲4.52 |
| INC | Kamal Arora | 3,453 | 3.28 | ▼15.86 |
| NOTA | None of the above | 402 | 0.38 | ▲0.10 |
| Majority | | 12,748 | 12.09 | ▲6.78 |
| Turnout | | 1,05,404 | 61.01 | ▼1.28 |
| BJP hold | | Swing | | |

=== 2020 ===
Delhi Assembly elections, 2020: Gandhi Nagar
| Party | Candidate | Votes | % | ±% |
|---|---|---|---|---|
| BJP | Anil Kumar Bajpai | 48,824 | 42.64 | +4.05 |
| AAP | Naveen Chaudhary | 42,745 | 37.33 | −7.91 |
| INC | Arvinder Singh Lovely | 21,913 | 19.14 | +4.73 |
| BSP | Tikraj Singh | 357 | 0.31 | −0.09 |
| NOTA | None of the above | 326 | 0.28 | −0.15 |
| Majority | | 6,079 | 5.31 | −1.34 |
| Turnout | | 1,14,622 | 62.69 | −4.03 |
| BJP gain from AAP | | Swing | +4.05 | |

=== 2015 ===
Delhi Assembly elections, 2015: Gandhi Nagar
| Party | Candidate | Votes | % | ±% |
|---|---|---|---|---|
| AAP | Anil Kumar Bajpai | 50,946 | 45.24 | +28.84 |
| BJP | Jitender | 43,464 | 38.59 | +6.93 |
| INC | Surender Prakash Sharma | 16,228 | 14.41 | −34.06 |
| BSP | Dharmender Kumar | 456 | 0.40 | −0.70 |
| SS | Vijay Singh | 165 | 0.14 | +0.07 |
| NOTA | None of the above | 492 | 0.43 | −0.10 |
| Majority | | 7,482 | 6.65 | −10.16 |
| Turnout | | 1,12,631 | 66.72 | |
| AAP gain from INC | | Swing | +11.81 | |

=== 2013 ===
Delhi Assembly elections, 2013: Gandhi Nagar
| Party | Candidate | Votes | % | ±% |
|---|---|---|---|---|
| INC | Arvinder Singh Lovely | 48,897 | 48.47 | −15.78 |
| BJP | Ramesh Chand Jain | 31,936 | 31.66 | +1.72 |
| AAP | Anil Kumar Bajpai | 16,546 | 16.40 | |
| PECP | Nafis Ahmed | 1,193 | 1.18 | |
| BSP | Om Pal Singh | 1,105 | 1.10 | −3.22 |
| NOTA | None | 531 | 0.53 | |
| Majority | | 16,961 | 16.81 | −17.50 |
| Turnout | | 100,883 | 65.86 | |
| INC hold | | Swing | -15.78 | |

=== 2008 ===
Delhi Assembly elections, 2008: Gandhi Nagar
| Party | Candidate | Votes | % | ±% |
|---|---|---|---|---|
| INC | Arvinder Singh Lovely | 59,795 | 64.25 | −9.28 |
| BJP | Kamal Kumar Jain | 27,870 | 29.94 | +5.69 |
| BSP | Sanjay Gaur | 4,024 | 4.32 | |
| Independent | Sunil Kumar | 555 | 0.60 | |
| Majority | | 31,923 | 34.31 | −14.97 |
| Turnout | | 93,073 | 63.5 | +7.31 |
| INC hold | | Swing | -9.28 | |

=== 2003 ===
Delhi Assembly elections, 2003: Gandhi Nagar
| Party | Candidate | Votes | % | ±% |
|---|---|---|---|---|
| INC | Arvinder Singh Lovely | 35,791 | 73.53 | +31.86 |
| BJP | Tarjeet Singh | 11,806 | 24.25 | −4.56 |
| Majority | | 23,985 | 49.28 | −36.42 |
| Turnout | | 48,677 | 56.19 | −1.39 |
| INC hold | | Swing | -31.86 | |

=== 1998 ===
Delhi Assembly elections, 1998: Gandhi Nagar
| Party | Candidate | Votes | % | ±% |
|---|---|---|---|---|
| INC | Arvinder Singh Lovely | 21,905 | 41.67 | +0.81 |
| BJP | Swinderjit Singh Bajwa | 15,143 | 28.81 | −17.95 |
| Independent | Raghuvir Singh Jain | 8,144 | 15.49 | |
| Independent | Naveen Chaudhary | 5,159 | 9.81 | |
| BSP | Sanjay Kumar Gahlot | 1,468 | 2.79 | +2.38 |
| Majority | | 5,762 | 12.86 | +6.96 |
| Turnout | | 52,570 | 57.58 | −10.66 |
| INC gain from BJP | | Swing | +0.81 | |

=== 1993 ===
Delhi Assembly elections, 1993: Gandhi Nagar
| Party | Candidate | Votes | % | ±% |
|---|---|---|---|---|
| BJP | Darshan Kumar Bahl | 23,093 | 46.76 | |
| INC | Pyare Lal Ghee Waley | 20,176 | 40.86 | |
| JD | Chowdhary Dharam Singh | 3,703 | 7.50 | |
| Majority | | 2,917 | 5.90 | |
| Turnout | | 49,383 | 68.24 | |
| BJP hold | | Swing | | |
