= Shri Dutt Sharma =

Indian politician

MLA, Sixth Legislative Assembly of Delhi
- In office Mar 2015 – Feb 2020
- Preceded by: Sahab Singh Chauhan
- Succeeded by: Ajay Mahawar
- Constituency: Ghonda

Personal details
- Born: 1 July 1960 (age 66) Delhi
- Citizenship: Indian
- Party: Aam Aadmi Party
- Children: 2
- Education: Intermediate examination from CBSE
- Profession: Businessman & politician
- Website: www.mlacare.in

Shri Dutt Sharma is an Indian politician and was a member of the Sixth Legislative Assembly of Delhi. He is a member of the Aam Aadmi Party and represented Ghonda (Assembly constituency) of Delhi from 2015 to 2020. Also, he is the founder of Pt. Yad Ram Secondary Public School Bhajanpura Delhi (Estd. in 1992).

== Early life and education ==
Born on 1 July 1960 in Delhi, Sharma belongs to social and pious family residing in Vill. Gamri, Bhajanpura, Delhi before 17th century.

He passed his Intermediate examination from CBSE (Raghuber Dayal Jan Kalyan School Bhajanpura).

To know his family background, past life and life journey you may visit video interview given to HamareNetaji.com : https://www.youtube.com/watch?v=9csJdFiUOOo

== Political career ==
He joined Aam Aadmi Party on 10 December 2013. He contested Delhi Assembly Election 2015 and defeated Sahib Singh Chauhan (BJP) & Bhisham Sharma (Congress).

He lost to Ajay Mahawar (BJP) by a margin of 28370 votes in the 2020 elections.

== Posts held ==
#	From	To	Position	Comments
01	2015	2020	Member, Sixth Legislative Assembly of Delhi	

Chairman of District Development Committee (North East Delhi) 2015-2020

== See also ==
- Sixth Legislative Assembly of Delhi
- Delhi Legislative Assembly
- Government of India
- Politics of India
- Aam Aadmi Party
