= Anil Kumar Bajpai =

Indian politician (born 1957)

MLA, 06th Legislative Assembly, Delhi
- In office 10 February 2015 – 8 February 2025
- Preceded by: Arvinder Singh Lovely
- Succeeded by: Arvinder Singh Lovely
- Constituency: Gandhi Nagar

Personal details
- Born: 26 February 1957 (age 69) Farrukhabad, Uttar Pradesh, India
- Party: Bharatiya Janata Party
- Spouse: Kalpana Bajpai (wife)
- Parent: Narender Nath Bajpai (father)
- Education: Chaudhary Charan Singh University
- Profession: Businessperson, politician

Anil Kumar Bajpai (born 26 February 1957) is an Indian politician and former member of the Sixth Legislative Assembly of Delhi. He represented the Gandhi Nagar constituency of Delhi and is a member of the Bharatiya Janta Party.

== Early life and education ==
Anil Kumar Bajpai was born in Farrukhabad. He attended the Chaudhary Charan Singh University and attained a Bachelor of Arts degree.

== Political career ==
Anil Kumar Bajpai has been an MLA for one term. He represented the Gandhi Nagar constituency and is a member of the BJP.

== Posts ==
#	From	To	Position	Comments
01	2015	2018	Member, Sixth Legislative Assembly of Delhi	

== See also ==
- Aam Aadmi Party
- Delhi Legislative Assembly
- Government of India
- Politics of India
- Sixth Legislative Assembly of Delhi

State Legislative Assembly	Member of the Delhi Legislative Assembly from Gandhi Nagar Assembly constituency 2020– 2025	Succeeded by Arvinder Singh Lovely
