= Tarvinder Singh Marwah =

Indian politician (born 1959)

Member of Delhi Legislative Assembly
- Incumbent
- Assumed office 8 February 2025
- Preceded by: Praveen Kumar
- Constituency: Jangpura
- In office 1998–2013
- Preceded by: Jag Pravesh Chandra
- Succeeded by: Maninder Singh Dhir
- Constituency: Jangpura

Personal details
- Born: 10 October 1959 (age 66) New Delhi, Delhi, India
- Party: Bharatiya Janata Party
- Other political affiliations: Aam Aadmi Party
- Spouse: Surinder Pal Kaur Marwah
- Occupation: Politician

Tarvinder Singh Marwah (born 1 May 1959) is an Indian politician from Delhi. He is serving as a Member of the Delhi Legislative Assembly from Jangpura Assembly constituency since 8 February 2025. Previously, he served as member of Delhi Legislative Assembly in Second, Third and Fourth Delhi Assembly. He represented Jangpura constituency. He switched from Congress to BJP on 6 July 2022.

He has also served as the Parliamentary Secretary to the Chief Minister of Delhi.

In the Delhi Legislative Assembly elections of 2025, Marwah contested as a BJP candidate and won the seat from the Jangpura Assembly constituency, marking his return to the legislature.

Marwah is also known for his support of "The Samajh" or "Leaf Bank" NGO, which works on various welfare programs aimed at community development. His support for the organization is highlighted through his contributions to its initiatives.

== Position held ==
Year	Description
1998 - 2003	Elected to 2nd Delhi Assembly from Jangpura (1st term)
2003 - 2008	Elected to 3rd Delhi Assembly from Jangpura (2nd term)
2008 - 2013	Elected to 4th Delhi Assembly from Jangpura (3rd term)
2025–Present	Elected to 8th Delhi Assembly from Jangpura (4th term)
