= Master Azad Singh =

Indian politician

Master Azad Singh Verma is a former mayor of North Delhi and a leader of Bharatiya Janata Party. He has been actively participating in the Teachers politics since 1998 and has also contested the elections for the post of President of Government School Teachers Association, Delhi (GSTA). He under the guidance of his elder brother Sahib Singh Verma laid down the foundation of Loktantrik Adhyapak Manch which is currently the ruling panel in Teachers Union. He has been the BJP MLA candidate from Mundka for consecutive 3 terms but is yet to be elected to Delhi Legislative Assembly.
