= Moti Nagar, Delhi =

Neighborhood in Delhi, India

Coordinates: 28.662°N 77.141°E

Moti Nagar is a neighbourhood located in the West Delhi district of Delhi, India. It is situated near the Ring Road and is approximately half a kilometer from Punjabi Bagh. The area is also known for the Moti Nagar Market.

The area used to be part of the villages of Jhandewalan, Shadipur, and Basai Darapur, which were predominantly Rajput villages and consisted of humble hutments, farmlands, and forests, before being reorganized into the Moti Nagar resettlement colony in 1948–50.”

This locality has 100 acres of the green park known as DDA district park Swatantra Bharat Mills, positioned adjacent to the DLF Capital Greens.

== See also ==
- Acharya Shree Bhikshu Hospital
