= Ajeet Singh Kharkhari =

Indian politician

Ajeet Singh Kharkhari (born 22 August 1955 in Delhi) is an Indian politician and a leader of Bharatiya Janata Party. He was elected to Delhi Legislative Assembly from Najafgarh constituency in Fifth Delhi Assembly.
