= Ghonda =

Residential area in Delhi, India

Coordinates: 28°41′N 77°16′E

- Ghonda
- Interactive map of Ghonda
- Country: India
- State: Delhi
- District: Northeast Delhi

Government
  - Body: Municipal Corporation of Delhi

Languages
  - Official: Hindi, English, Gujari
- Time zone: UTC+5:30 (IST)
- PIN: 110053
- Telephone code: 011
- Nearest city: NCR
- Lok Sabha constituency: Northeast Delhi
- Vidhan Sabha constituency: Ghonda
- Civic agency: Municipal Corporation of Delhi

Ghonda is an affluent residential area located in the North East Delhi Legislative Assembly district.

== Politics ==
During the last few decades, residents of Ghonda have generally supported the Bhartiya Janata Party (BJP), who have been in power in the area since the Lok Sabha elections of the Northeast Delhi constituency in 1993. The second most popular political party within Ghonda was historically the Indian National Congress (INC), which performed well in the 1998, 2003, and 2008 local elections. In the 2015 election, the residents of Ghonda elected representatives from the Aam Aadmi Party (AAP), ending the almost-decade long INC and BJP winning streaks. However, in 2020, the constituency again became a BJP stronghold.

Election	Member	Party
1993	Lal Behari Tiwari	Bharatiya Janata Party
1998 & 2003	Bheeshma Sharma	Indian National Congress
2008 & 2013	Sahab Singh Chauhan	Bharatiya Janata Party
2015	Shri Dutt Sharma	Aam Aadmi Party
2020	Ajay Mahawar	Bharatiya Janata Party

== Notable people ==
- Ajay Mahawar is the Member of the Legislative Assembly (MLA) representing the Ghonda area.
- Manoj Tiwari is the member of the National Lok Sabha (Parliament) representing this area.
- A well-known social advocate, Sarfraz Ahmed from Sarai Ghasi, lives in the C block of Yamuna Vihar in Ghonda.

== Schools ==
Notable schools in this area include:

- Nav Jeewan Adarsh Public School
- Pt. Yadram Secondary Public School at Bhajanpura Thana Road

== Attractions ==
- Dilli Darbar Sweets and Chat Corner
- Pahadi Mandir (Shiv Mandir)
- Sanwals Shop K-Block. Main road
- Subhash Vihar Gali No.10
- Gulzar Chicken Biryani, momeen Chawk
- Nav Yuvak Ramlila in Subhash Vihar
- Eid Mela at DDA Ground
- Saree Mahal Emporium (ladies' warehouse)
- Anuradha Saree Emporium (ladies' warehouse)
- Ayurdarshan Healthcare
