= Sat Prakash Rana =

Indian politician

Sat Prakash Rana (born 21 March 1965) is an Indian Politician, leader of the Bharatiya Janata Party and a former member of the Delhi Legislative Assembly from the Bijwasan constituency. He has worked extensively on his constituency facilitating creation of new roads, highways, parks and enriching the environment by organising and participating in large scale planting (and protection) of trees. He has served as an MLA (bijwasan constituency) 3 times and remains the pillar of BJP south-west Delhi.

In the 2020 Delhi Legislative Election Bharatiya Janata Party candidate Sat Prakash Rana stood second with 56,518 votes. He lost by 753 votes. This was categorized as the most marginal victory as the number of votes difference was lowest (753).
