= Subhash Sachdeva =

Indian politician

Subhash Sachdeva (born 25 April 1956) is a leader of Bharatiya Janata Party and a former member of the Delhi Legislative Assembly. He was elected to the assembly first time in 2004 by election from Moti Nagar and was reelected in 2008 and 2013.
