= Dabri =

Dabri may refer to several places:

== India ==
- Dabri, Delhi, a residential colony in South West Delhi
  - Dabri Mor - Janakpuri South metro station
- Dabri Chhoti, a village in Churu district, Rajasthan
- Dabri, Jodhpur, a village located in Osian tehsil of Jodhpur Rural district, Rajasthan
- Bholar Dabri, census town in the state of West Bengal

== Pakistan ==
- Dabri, Pakistan, a village in Punjab, Pakistana

== See also ==
- Dabra, a town in Madhya Pradesh, India
  - Dabra railway station
  - Dabra Assembly constituency
- Dabra, Rajasthan, a village in Rajasthan, India
