= Dashrath Puri =

- Town
- Location in India
- Coordinates: 28.605105°N 77.086397°E
- Country: India
- State: Delhi

Languages
  - Official: Hindi, English
- Time zone: UTC+5:30 (IST)
- PIN: 110045
- Telephone code: 011
- Lok Sabha constituency: West Delhi
- Vidhan Sabha constituency: Dwarka

Dashrath Puri is a small colony consisting of around 1000 houses situated on Main Palam-Dabri Road in South West Delhi, India. Currently, this colony falls under Dwarka (earlier it was under the Nasirpur constituency which was dissolved due to delimitation) and West Delhi (earlier it was under the Outer Delhi parliamentary constituency which was also dissolved due to delimitation). Schools : Jindal Public School Coaching Centre : A.K Institute of Studies, Street No. 4, Dabri Village Pitajis Bridhashram at B-1/1 near Shani Mandir houses old and destitute patients. The Bridhashram also runs free allopathic, homeopathic and dentist OPDs in its dispensary.

== Neighbourhood ==
Dashrath puri is located close to other colonies of New Delhi such as Dabri Village, Janakpuri, Vikaspuri, Dwarka Sub City as well as the Indira Gandhi International Airport. The IT city of India, Gurgaon, is about half an hour from Dashrath Puri.

=== Politics ===
Dashrath Puri's MLA is Pradyuman Rajput of the Bharatiya Janata Party, and its Member of Parliament is Parvesh Verma of the BJP.

=== People ===
Although it is a very small colony people from different parts of India live here. The population mainly consists of people from India Punjab, Haryana, Uttarakhand, Rajasthan, Uttar Pradesh, Bihar, Himachal Pradesh, Tamil Nadu, Kerala, and West Bengal.

== Accessibility ==
- Dashrath puri has a well-connected road network.
- Nearest metro station is Dashrath Puri.
- Nearest railway station is Palam and Delhi Cantt. railway station.
- Major DTC Bus Routes touches Dashrath puri are 721, 761, 778, 801, RL-75, RL-77, RL-79 etc. In addition to this there are other RTVs & Metro feeder vehicles are operating with lower frequencies.
- DTC Bus Route no. 721 to ISBT Kashmiri Gate, 772 and 801 to Uttam Nagar, Janakpuri, Vikaspuri, Peeragarhi, Rohini, Pitam Pura & Azad Pur & RL-77 to New Delhi railway station respectively are the most frequent bus services from Dashrath puri.

=== Metro station ===
Dashrath Puri is a functional metro station in the third phase of the Magenta line from Janakpuri (west) to Botanical Garden Noida.

=== Delhi Metro ===
Dabri Mor - Janakpuri South metro station has been constructed near C2D Janakpuri block near Dabri Mor. It was opened for public on 29 May 2018. It is electrified with 25 KW 50 Hz AC through overhead catenary. Its services are from preceding station Delhi Metro Following station Janakpuri West Terminus Magenta Line Dashrath Puri toward Botanical Garden. On all stations lying in Magenta Line, there are platform doors, that open only when the doors of incoming metro trains are aligned with it when metro comes to halt, enhancing the safety against falling between the gaps.

== See also ==
- Districts of Delhi
- Neighbourhoods of Delhi
