= Mahabal Mishra =

Indian politician

Councillor for Municipal Corporation of Delhi
- In office 1997–1998
- Constituency: Dabri, Delhi

Member of Legislative Assembly, Delhi
- In office 1998–2008
- Preceded by: Vinod Kumar Sharma
- Succeeded by: Constituency Demolished
- Constituency: Nasirpur

Member of Legislative Assembly, Delhi
- In office 2008–2009
- Preceded by: Constituency Established
- Succeeded by: Parduymn Rajput
- Constituency: Dwarka

Member of Parliament, Lok Sabha
- In office 2009–2014
- Preceded by: Constituency Established
- Succeeded by: Parvesh Verma
- Constituency: West Delhi

Personal details
- Born: 31 July 1953 (age 73) New Delhi, India
- Party: Aam Aadmi Party (since 2022); Indian National Congress (1997-2022)
- Spouse: Urmila Mishra (m. 1966)
- Children: 3 (including Vinay Mishra)
- Education: (9th pass); Diploma in Transistor Theory
- Occupation: Politician
- Website: Profile at archive.india.gov.in

Mahabal Mishra (born 31 July 1953) is a former member of parliament of India from West Delhi winning on an Indian National Congress ticket. Before getting elected to Parliament, he was an MLA from Dwarka Assembly constituency in New Delhi. He started his political career as a Delhi councilor from Municipal Corporation of Delhi, representing Dabri, Delhi ward in 1997. In the 1998 Delhi assembly elections, he was elected MLA from Nasirpur assembly constituency. He was re-elected and held his seat in the 2003 and 2008 assembly elections also.
