= Dabri, Delhi =

Dabri
- Neighborhood of Delhi
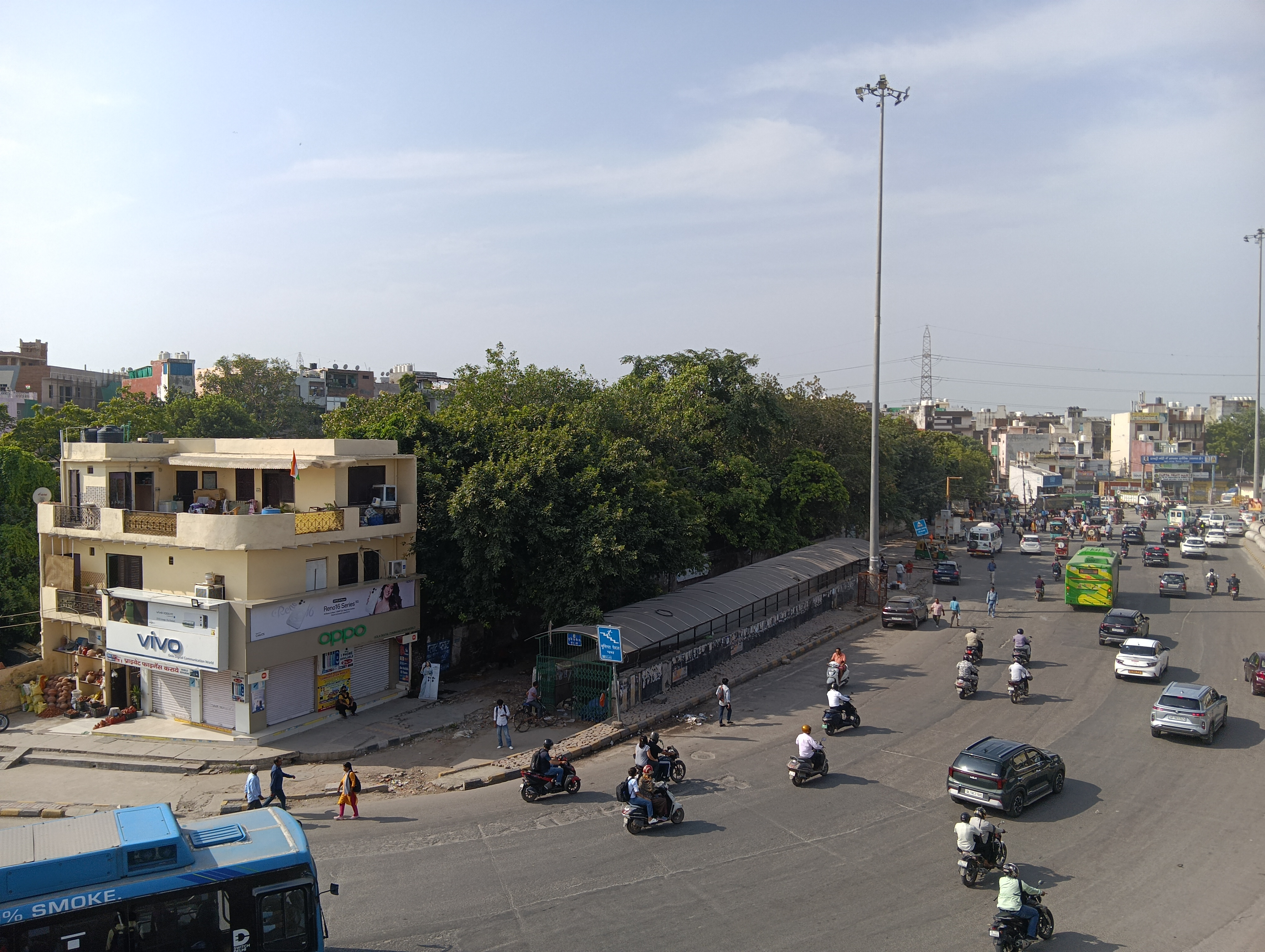

- Location in Delhi, India
- Coordinates: 28.609675°N 77.089542°E
- Country: India
- Union Territory: Delhi
- District: South West Delhi

Government
  - Lok Sabha constituency: West Delhi
  - Vidhan Sabha constituency: Dwarka

Languages
  - Official Languages: Hindi & English
- Time zone: UTC+5:30 (IST)
- PIN: 110045
- Telephone code: 011
- Vehicle registration: DL-4S, DL-4C, DL-9C, DL-9S

Dabri is a village, near Janakpuri in the South West district in the Indian Union Territory of Delhi. Its pincode is 110045. Its nearest metro station is Dabri Mor Janakpuri South metro station. It comes under Dwarka Assembly Constituency.

== Neighbourhood ==
Dabri is very well connected to other colonies of New Delhi such as Janakpuri, Vikaspuri, Palam, Dwarka Sub City, Delhi Cantonment, Uttam Nagar as well as the Indira Gandhi International Airport and Gurgaon (via Dwarka Sub City).

== Geography ==
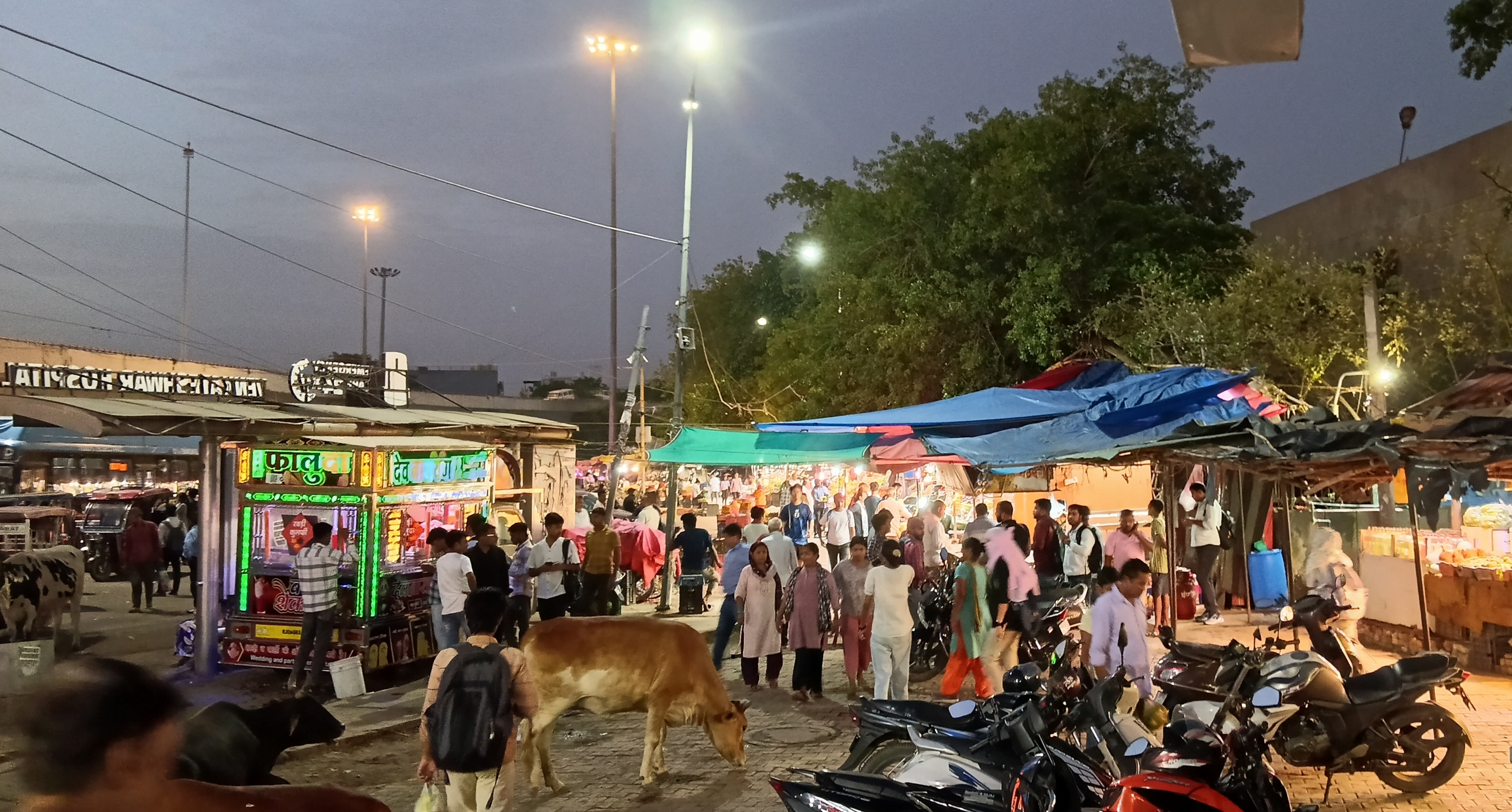
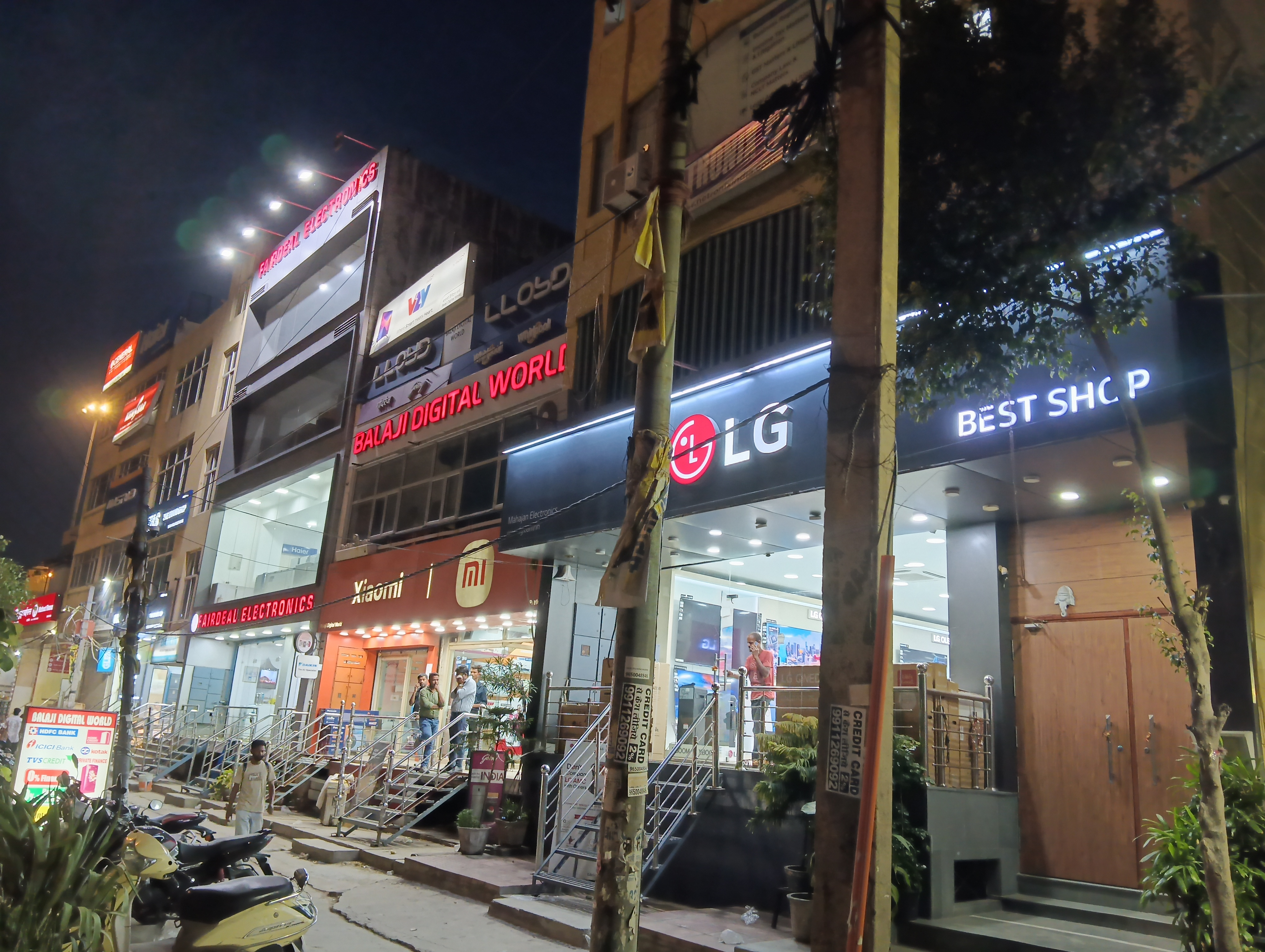
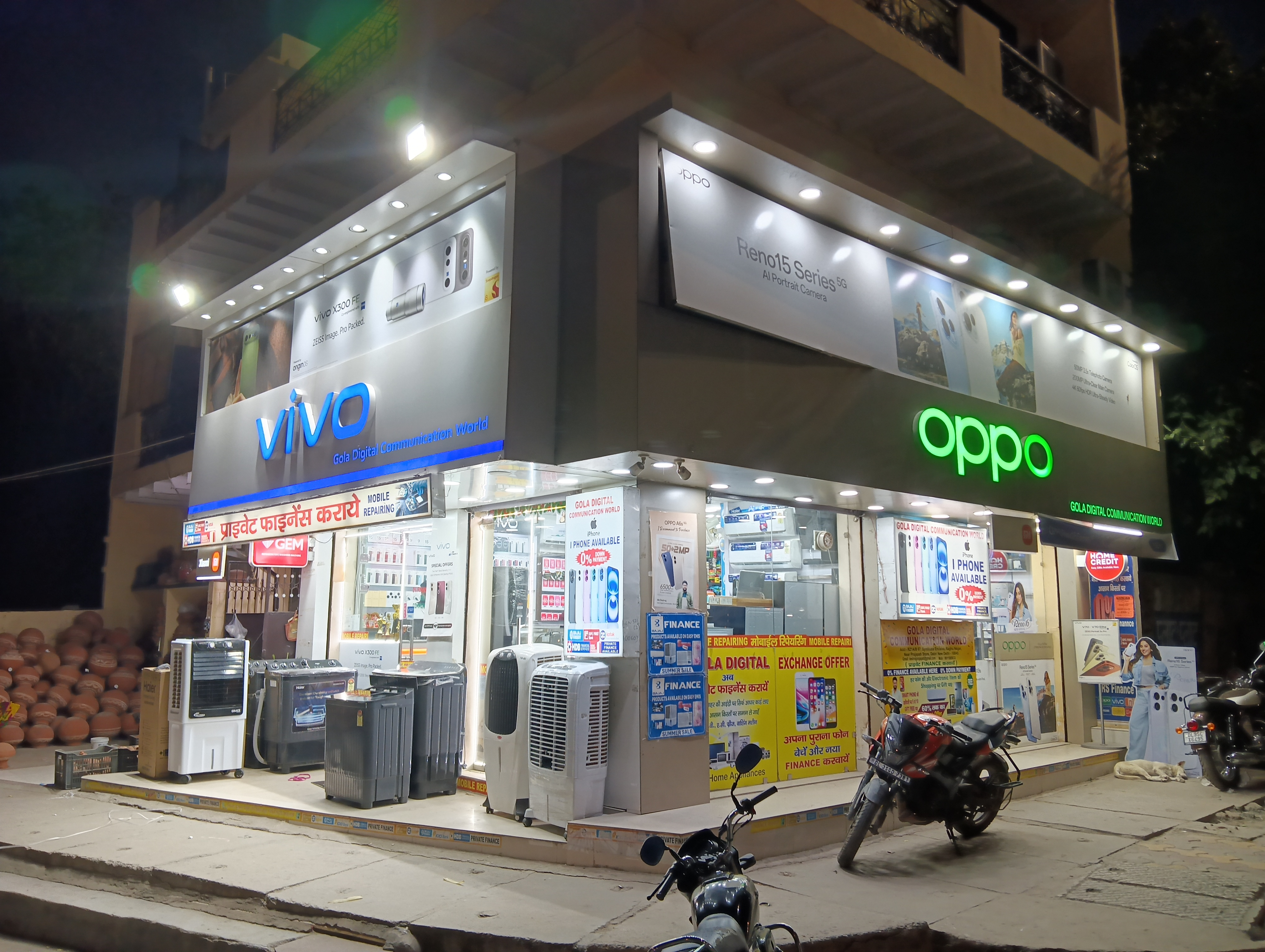
(Clockwise from top left) Dabri marketplace consisting of fruits-vegetables, home appliances-electronics and an Oppo and Vivo mobile outlet.

Dabri is divided into smaller regions: The Main Land Dabri Village further divided into Syndicate Enclave, Raghu Nagar, Dabri Extension Main, Vaishali colony, Dabri Extension East and Sitapuri.

Dabri is a historial Village in Delhi. The village has been fully urbanised now and does not have any agricultural lands after government acquisition for Dwarka and Janakpuri development project under land acquisition Act 1894.

== Politics ==
Dabri's MLA is Parduymn Rajput of BJP and Member of Parliament is Kamaljeet Sehrawat of BJP.

== Accessibility ==
- Dabri has a robust and well connected road network and one of the most well connected colonies in South-West Delhi area.
- Nearest metro station is Dabri Mor metro station which is situated in C2D Janakpuri south block. It was opened on 29 May 2018.
- Nearest railway station is Delhi Cantt and Palam railway station.
- Major DTC Bus Routes connecting Dabri to the rest of the city are 718,721,740A,741,761,775,778,778A,794,801,840,877,947, RL-75, RL-77, RL-79, (+)(-) Outer Mudrika etc. In addition to this there are other RTVs & Metro feeder vehicles operating at lower frequencies.
- DTC Bus Route no. 721, 740 & RL-77 are the most frequent bus services from Dabri to ISBT (Kashmere gate), Nehru Place, ISBT (Anand Vihar), New Delhi railway station respectively.

=== Delhi Metro ===
Dabri Mor - Janakpuri South metro station has been constructed near C2D Janakpuri block near Dabri Mor. It was opened for public on 29 May 2018. It is electrified with 25 KW 50 Hz AC through overhead catenary. Its services are from preceding station Delhi Metro Following station Janakpuri West Terminus Magenta Line Dashrath Puri toward Botanical Garden. On all stations lying in Magenta Line, there are platform doors, that open only when the doors of incoming metro trains are aligned with it when metro comes to halt, enhancing the safety against falling between the gaps.
