= Sagar Pur =

Sagarpur
- town
- Country: India
- State: Delhi
- District: South West Delhi

Government
  - Lok Sabha constituency: West Delhi
  - Vidhan Sabha constituency: Dwarka

Languages
  - Official: Hindi, English, Bhojpuri
- Time zone: UTC+5:30 (IST)
- PIN: 110046
- Telephone code: 011
- Vehicle registration: DL-4S, DL-4C, DL-9C, DL-9S
- Literacy: 82%

Sagarpur situated on Pankha Road, South West Delhi on the way to Janakpuri from Delhi Cantonment. Currently this colony comes under Dwarka (33) Vidhansabha constituency (Earlier it was under Nasirpur constituency (29) which was dissolved due to delimitation) and West Delhi(Earlier it was under Outer Delhi parliamentary constituency which was dissolved due to delimitation).

== Politics ==
Sagarpur has always been crucial to active politics since this colony was made three decades ago. In 1993, when Delhi held its first state election for the 70 MLA seats, the Bharatiya Janata Party (BJP) swept the Indian National Congress party by grabbing 49 seats. Mr. Vinod Kumar Sharma was the first MLA who got elected from Nasirpur Constituency on BJP seat. Indian National Congress leader Mr. Mahabal Mishra won three consecutive elections in 1998, 2003 & 2008 from the seat, and was later elected as the Member of Parliament of the area in Indian general election, 2009 from West Delhi. In 2009 by-elections, Bharatiya Janata Party leader Mr. Pradyumn Rajput won the seat. Currently this seat is occupied by Vinay Mishra from Aam Aadmi Party.

== See also ==
- Districts of Delhi
- Neighbourhoods of Delhi
