= KharKhari Jatmal =

Village in Delhi, India

Kharkhari Jatmal
- Village
- Location of the village within Delhi
- Coordinates: 28°35′N 76°57′E
- Country: India
- Union Territory: Delhi
- District: South West Delhi
- Sub-division: Najafgarh

Population (2011)
  - Total: 1,284
- Time zone: UTC+5:30 (IST)

Kharkhari Jatmal is a village located in the Najafgarh sub-division, South West Delhi district of Delhi. As of the 2011 Census of India, it has a population of 1,284 spread over 239 households.

== Government and politics ==
At the state level, the village comes under the Matiala constituency of the Delhi Legislative Assembly. As of the 2020 Delhi Legislative Assembly election, its representative in the assembly is Gulab Singh of the Aam Aadmi Party.

== See also ==
- Najafgarh
