= Deepak Bharadwaj =

Indian politician (1950–2013)

Deepak Bhardwaj
- Constituency: West Delhi

Personal details
- Born: Sonipat, Haryana, India
- Died: 26 March 2013 Delhi
- Party: Bahujan Samaj Party
- Children: Two
- Occupation: Property dealer, hotelier, school owner

Deepak Bhardwaj (1950–2013) was an Indian politician affiliated to Bahujan Samaj Party (BSP). Bhardwaj contested election for 15th Lok Sabha from the West Delhi Constituency in May 2009. As per media reports, he was the richest candidates for the 15th Lok Sabha elections with declared assets amounting to ₹6.3 billion. At the time of contesting elections he was also facing two criminal cases. Bhardwaj was distantly related to Bollywood actor Shah Rukh Khan.

== Early life ==
Bhardwaj was born at Sonipat, Haryana in 1950 in a Jangid Brahmin family. His family had a few acres of land. After graduating in commerce from Delhi University's School of Open Learning, he became a stenographer with the Delhi government's sales tax office.

== Career ==
In his early career, Deepak Bhardwaj started an automobile parts business while simultaneously working as a real estate broker. He acquired agricultural land for industrial use and for developing farmhouses. After shutting down his automobile business in 1979, Bhardwaj began focusing full-time on real estate.

Bhardwaj was involved in real estate, hospitality, and education. He operated a school in Dwarka and had plans to open two additional schools, one in Dwarka and another in Dhansa, both located in West Delhi. He resided in Lajwanti Garden, West Delhi, and owned a township project in Haridwar as well as a hotel on the Delhi–Gurgaon Expressway.

Bhardwaj stated that real estate was "the surest way of getting rich." In the 2009 Indian general election, he was the richest Lok Sabha candidate, with declared assets exceeding ₹6.3 billion, jointly held with his wife.

Upon filing his nomination for the West Delhi Lok Sabha seat on 16 April 2009, Deepak Bhardwaj drew media attention due to his substantial declared assets, which exceeded ₹603 crore. This disclosure positioned him as the richest candidate in the 2009 general elections. When questioned about his wealth, Bhardwaj stated, "It's a non-issue. I had to declare what I had in my books." The contrast between his financial status and his affiliation with the Bahujan Samaj Party (BSP), sparked public debate. His campaign team viewed the attention positively, with his publicity manager noting, "It’s helped us differentiate him from other candidates. Now everyone knows his name."

Prior to Bhardwaj's affidavit, the richest candidate in Delhi was Kanwar Singh Tanwar, with assets of ₹1.55 billion. Tanwar, a Gurjar born in Fatehpur village in the South Delhi area of Chhatarpur, now he has a mansion there.

== Death ==
Deepak Bhardwaj was shot dead on 26 March 2013 by two unidentified assailants at his 34 acres (14 ha) farmhouse, Nitesh Kunj, located in the Rajokri area of Vasant Kunj, New Delhi. According to Delhi Police, Bhardwaj had been estranged from his family for several months, and the murder was allegedly motivated by a property dispute. His farmhouse situated along National Highway 8 near the Gurgaon Toll Plaza.

The alleged assailants were captured on CCTV footage exiting the farmhouse while brandishing a firearm and fleeing in a grey Škoda car. They were arrested two weeks later. On 10 April 2013, Delhi Police arrested Bhardwaj's younger son, Nitesh Bhardwaj, and his lawyer, Baljeet Singh Sehrawat, in connection with the murder. Investigations revealed that the crime was allegedly orchestrated by Nitesh, who had hired contract killers through Sehrawat, reportedly offering ₹5 crore for the act.

The BSP candidate's son, Nitesh, is related to the actor Shah Rukh Khan. Nitesh's wife is the sister of Gauri Khan, Shah Rukh Khan's wife.
