= Sumesh Shokeen =

Indian politician

Member of the Delhi Legislative Assembly
- In office 2008–2013
- Preceded by: Constituency Established
- Succeeded by: Rajesh Gahlot
- Constituency: Matiala

Personal details
- Born: Delhi, India
- Party: Aam Aadmi Party
- Other political affiliations: Indian National Congress
- Profession: politician

Sumesh Shokeen is an Indian politician and a leader of Aam Aadmi Party. He was elected to Delhi Legislative Assembly from Matiala constituency in Fourth Delhi Assembly.

Sumesh Shokeen joined Aam Aadmi Party in the presence of its national convener Arvind Kejriwal on 18 November 2024 and contested as AAP candidate from Matiala in 2025 Assembly Elections and lost to Sandeep Sehrawat of BJP with a margin of 28,723 votes.
