= Adarsh Shastri =

Indian activist

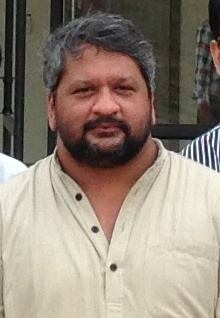

MLA of Delhi Legislative Assembly
- In office 11 February 2015 – 11 February 2020
- Preceded by: Parduymn Rajput
- Succeeded by: Vinay Mishra
- Constituency: Dwarka

Personal details
- Born: 16 October 1973 (age 52) New Delhi, India
- Party: Indian National Congress (2020-Present) Aam Aadmi Party (2013-2020)
- Spouse: Monika Shastri
- Parent(s): Anil Shastri and Manju Shastri
- Education: Lal Bahadur Shastri Institute of Management; Hindu College, Delhi; St. Columba's School, Delhi
- Occupation: Political & Social Activist

Adarsh Shastri (born 16 October 1973) is an Indian politician. He is a former senior official of the Aam Aadmi Party and represented the Delhi assembly constituency of Dwarka. He left AAP and joined Indian National Congress in 2020.

Prior to his political career, Shastri worked in the corporate sector for 17 years, including the post of head of sales at Apple India.

== Early life ==
Adarsh Shastri is the son of Anil Shastri, and Manju Shastri, and is married to Monika Shastri. The couple has twin sons. His father was a former Finance Minister in the Government of India and was elected to the 9th Lok Sabha from Varanasi in 1989. Shastri is an alumnus of St. Columba's School, Delhi and Hindu College, University of Delhi. He has a master's degree in business administration from Lal Bahadur Shastri Institute of Management. He is a grandson of Lal Bahadur Shastri.

== Political career ==
Shastri left his job as the sales head for Apple India in 2013 and joined the Aam Aadmi Party. He did not join Indian National Congress as he felt he would not be able to fit into the party. Shastri was a co-convenor of the overseas wing of the Aam Aadmi Party (AAP), responsible for overseas organisational affairs.

He contested the 2015 Delhi Legislative Assembly election from Dwarka (Delhi Assembly constituency) and got 79,729 votes out of around 135,000 votes polled, defeating the sitting Member of Legislative Assembly, Pradyuman Rajput of the BJP by 39,366 votes.

Shastri led AAP's point-based initiative Delhi Dialogue, along with Ashish Khetan, Meera Sanyal, Preeti Sharma Menon. The AAP government subsequently expanded the concept by constituting the Delhi Dialogue Commission.

Shastri was a member of the AAP's National Manifesto Drafting Committee for the Loksabha Elections 2014, and was also in charge of the Manifesto Drafting Committee and a member of the Candidate Selection Committee of the Uttar Pradesh Chapter of AAP in Loksabha Elections 2014. He also contested Parliamentary Elections 2014 from Allahabad, Uttar Pradesh as a candidate for the AAP.

He left AAP and joined Indian National Congress in 2020.

== Other activities ==
He has been a member of the board of governors of Lal Bahadur Shastri Educational Society.

He is also the national secretary of the Indian Cellular Association, the industry body of the mobile industry. He acted as a mediator between traders and handset makers to curb online discounts to online sellers like Amazon.com, Flipkart and Snapdeal by brands such as Samsung, Apple and Nokia.

== Alumni and associations ==
- National Secretary, Indian Cellular Association (ICA)
- Trustee, Lal Bahadur Shastri National Memorial Trust
- Member of Governing Board, Lal Bahadur Shastri Educational Society
- Member of Governing Body, Lal Bahadur Shastri Seva Niketan
- Member, Associated Chambers of Commerce and Industry of India (ASSOCHAM)
- Member, Advisory Cell of Federation of Indian Chambers of Commerce and Industry (FICCI)
- Member, Advisory Body of Confederation of Indian Industry (CII)
- Member, National Geographic Society, USA
