= Dashrathpuri metro station =

Metro station in Delhi, India

Dashrathpuri

General information
- Location: Ch Harphool Singh Market, Naveen Kunj Society, Dashrath Puri, Delhi, 110045
- Coordinates: 28.6019°N 77.0824°E
- System: Delhi Metro station
- Owner: Delhi Metro
- Operator: Delhi Metro Rail Corporation (DMRC)
- Line: Magenta Line
- Platforms: Island Platform; Platform-1 → Botanical Garden; Platform-2 → Inderlok
- Tracks: 2

Construction
- Structure type: Underground, Double-track
- Platform levels: 2
- Accessible: Yes

Other information
- Status: Staffed, Operational
- Station code: DSHP

History
- Opened: 29 May 2018; 8 years ago
- Electrified: 25 kV 50 Hz AC through overhead catenary

Services
Preceding station	Delhi Metro	Following station
Dabri Mor - Janakpuri South towards Inderlok	Magenta Line	Palam towards Botanical Garden
Route map
Location

The Dashrathpuri metro station opened on 29 May 2018 for public on the Magenta Line of the Delhi Metro. The station is the part of Phase III of Delhi Metro.

== Station layout ==
G	Street Level	Exit/ Entrance
C	Concourse	Fare control, station agent, Ticket/token, shops
P	Platform 1 Eastbound	Towards → Botanical Garden; Next Station: Palam
P	Island platform | Doors will open on the right
P	Platform 2 Westbound	Towards ← Inderlok; Next Station: Dabri Mor - Janakpuri South

== Entry/Exit ==
Dashrathpuri metro station Entry/Exit
Gate No-1	Gate No-2	Gate No-3
Nasirpur Village	Sulabh International	Mahavir Enclave

== Connections ==
=== Bus ===
Delhi Transport Corporation bus routes number 740A, 801, 803, 947, 947A, AC-RL-77, RL-77, serves the station from nearby Dashrath Puri bus stop.

=== Delhi Metro ===
Dabri Mor - Janakpuri South metro station has been constructed near C2D Janakpuri block near Dabri Mor. It was opened for public on 29 May 2018. It is electrified with 25 KW 50 Hz AC through overhead catenary. Its services are from preceding station Delhi Metro Following station Janakpuri West Terminus Magenta Line Dashrath Puri toward Botanical Garden. On all stations lying in Magenta Line, there are platform doors, that open only when the doors of incoming metro trains are aligned with it when metro comes to halt, enhancing the safety against falling between the gaps.

== See also ==
- Delhi
- Palam
- Dashrath puri
- List of Delhi Metro stations
- Transport in Delhi
- Delhi Metro Rail Corporation
- Delhi Suburban Railway
- Delhi Monorail
- Indira Gandhi International Airport
- Delhi Transport Corporation
- South West Delhi
- National Capital Region (India)
- List of rapid transit systems
- List of metro systems
