= Parvesh Verma =

Indian politician (born 1977)

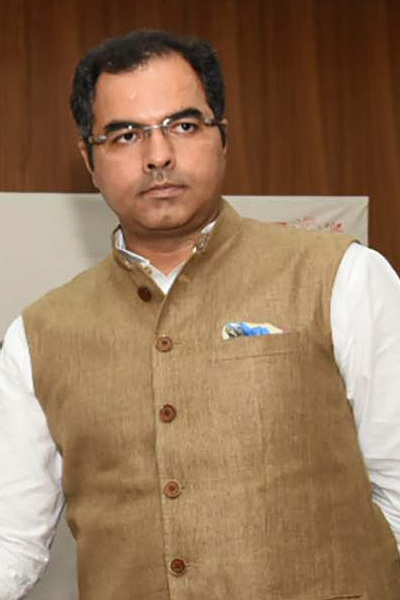
- Verma in 2025

Cabinet Minister Government of Delhi
- Incumbent
- Assumed office 20 February 2025
- Lieutenant Governor: Vinai Kumar Saxena; Taranjit Singh Sandhu
- Chief Minister: Rekha Gupta
- Ministry and Departments: Public Works Department (PWD); Legislative Affairs; Irrigation and Flood Control; Water; Gurudwara Elections

Member of Delhi Legislative Assembly
- Incumbent
- Assumed office 8 February 2025
- Preceded by: Arvind Kejriwal
- Constituency: New Delhi
- In office 8 December 2013 – 14 February 2014
- Preceded by: Yoganand Shastri
- Succeeded by: Naresh Yadav
- Constituency: Mehrauli

Member of Parliament, Lok Sabha
- In office 16 May 2014 – 4 June 2024
- Preceded by: Mahabal Mishra
- Succeeded by: Kamaljeet Sehrawat
- Constituency: West Delhi, Delhi

Personal details
- Born: 7 November 1977 (age 49) Mundka, Delhi, India
- Party: Bharatiya Janata Party
- Spouse: Swati Verma (m. 2002)
- Relations: Vikram Verma (father-in-law); Siddharth Singh Verma (brother)
- Children: 3
- Parents: Sahib Singh Verma (father); Sahib Kaur (mother)
- Education: Delhi University (BCom); Fore School of Management (MBA)

Parvesh Sahib Singh Verma (Hindi pronunciation: [/pərˈveɪʃ ˈsahɪb sɪŋ ˈvərmə/]) (born 7 November 1977) is an Indian politician currently serving as a Cabinet Minister in the Government of National Capital Territory of Delhi. He is also the elected member of the Delhi Legislative Assembly from the New Delhi Assembly constituency, having defeated Aam Aadmi Party's convenor and former Chief Minister Arvind Kejriwal in the 2025 election.

Before entering the Delhi Assembly, Verma served two consecutive terms as a Member of Parliament in the Lok Sabha, representing the West Delhi seat from 2014 to 2024. He won the 2014 general election with the highest victory margin among all Delhi candidates, and in 2019 secured the sixth-highest margin in the entire country—also the largest in Delhi's electoral history.

Verma's political journey began in 2013 when he contested and won the Mehrauli Assembly seat, defeating then–Delhi Assembly Speaker and former Cabinet Minister Yoganand Shastri. He is the son of former Delhi Chief Minister Sahib Singh Verma.

== Early life and education ==
Parvesh Verma was born to Sahib Singh Verma, a former Chief Minister of Delhi, and Sahib Kaur on 7 November 1977 in a Hindu Jat family in Delhi. Hailing from the native village of Mundka in Delhi, he has three sisters and a younger brother.

Verma completed his schooling at a government school and later at Delhi Public School, R. K. Puram. Coming from a nationalist and RSS-influenced family background, he undertook his “Balyakal Swayamsewak” ITC training in 1991 at Hari Nagar School in Delhi. He graduated from Kirori Mal College, University of Delhi, and went on to earn his Master of Business Administration degree from the Fore School of Management.

His uncle, Azad Singh Verma, served as the mayor of the North Delhi Municipal Corporation and contested the Mundka Assembly constituency as a BJP candidate in the 2013 Delhi Legislative Assembly elections.

== Political career ==
Verma expressed his interest in contesting the West Delhi Lok Sabha Constituency in the 2009 general election, reflecting his growing popularity and grassroots support. During the same period, senior party leader Jagdish Mukhi, the then-Member of the Legislative Assembly from Janakpuri, successfully represented the party for West Delhi. A mahapanchayat held on 22 March 2009 in Dwarka highlighted the widespread admiration and support for Verma’s leadership, showcasing strong encouragement from community members and local organisations.

== Personal life ==
Verma is married to Swati Verma, the daughter of former Union Minister and senior BJP leader from Madhya Pradesh, Vikram Verma. They have three children: two daughters and a son. He also runs the NGO Rashtriya Swabhiman. Additionally, Swati Verma’s mother, Neena Vikram Verma, is a multiple-term legislator and the sitting MLA from Dhar, Madhya Pradesh, a fact notable for the family's long-standing political lineage.

== Social Service ==
Verma has been involved in several community and relief activities through Rashtriya Swabhiman and Gramin Swabhiman, two organisations founded by his father, Dr. Sahib Singh Verma. The NGOs have undertaken rehabilitation work in villages affected by natural calamities and supported families of soldiers martyred during the Kargil conflict, with one of the redevelopment projects inaugurated by former President A. P. J. Abdul Kalam. They also organised literacy programmes across Delhi’s rural areas. During the COVID-19 pandemic, Verma helped set up temporary care centres, distributed oxygen concentrators and protective equipment, and extended financial assistance to families that had lost primary earners.

== Delhi politics ==
After serving one year as an MLA and a decade as a Lok Sabha MP, Parvesh Verma contested the 2025 Delhi Legislative Assembly election from the high-profile New Delhi Assembly constituency. Known for his criticism of the Aam Aadmi Party (AAP), he challenged AAP’s national convenor and former Chief Minister Arvind Kejriwal, who had represented the seat since 2013. The constituency, previously held by leaders such as Sheila Dikshit, had not been won by the Bharatiya Janata Party (BJP) since 1993.

Verma won the seat, defeating Arvind Kejriwal and Sandeep Dikshit of the Indian National Congress.

=== Goli Maro chants ===
In the 2020 Delhi elections, Verma, along with others including BJP leader Anurag Thakur, was accused of being one of the leaders who incited communal tension in Delhi using the inflammatory slogan "traitors of the country (Desh ke Gaddaron ko)", to which his audience replied "shoot the bastards (Goli maro salon ko)", which were repeated by him in January 2020 at a BJP rally. On August 26, 2020, an ACMM rejected the petition filed by Communist Party of India Marxist leader Brinda Karat under Section 156(3) of the Code of Criminal Procedure (CrPC), seeking registration of first information report (FIR) against Verma and Thakur , on the ground that the petitioner did not have previous sanction required as per law. On 13 June 2022, the Delhi High Court also dismissed the plea filed by Karat, challenging the trial court’s refusal, on the ground that the complainant had failed to follow the prescribed mechanism under CrPC.

The matter is presently sub-judice before the Supreme Court of India, which has issued notice to Delhi Police in the given matter.

== Cabinet Minister ==
Parvesh Verma was sworn in as a cabinet minister in the Government of Delhi on 20 February 2025 at Ramlila Maidan. He was assigned the portfolios of the Public Works Department (PWD), Water, Irrigation and Flood Control, Gurdwara Elections and Legislative Affairs.

Soon after assuming office, Verma conducted inspections across the Delhi stretch of the Yamuna River, focusing on pollution control and related infrastructure. He also oversaw multiple reviews of road, drainage, and water systems, which received significant media attention. On 24 June 2025, under his leadership, the PWD undertook an exercise to fill more than 3,400 potholes in a single day, an effort publicised as a potential world record.

== Slap Incident ==
On 27 September 2026, Verma was involved in a confrontation with a worker associated with Aam Aadmi Party MLA Jarnail Singh during an inspection of a newly constructed road in the Vikaspuri area of Delhi. Video footage of the incident circulated on social media and appeared to show Verma slapping the man after an argument during the inspection. The man subsequently filed a complaint with the Delhi Police, alleging that Verma had assaulted and threatened him. Verma said that he had been provoked after an alleged verbal exchange involving members of his family, while AAP leaders criticised his conduct and demanded action against him. Police subsequently registered a non-cognisable report in connection with the complaint.

== Electoral performance ==
2025 Delhi Legislative Assembly election: New Delhi
Party	Candidate	Votes	%	±%
BJP	Parvesh Verma	30,088	48.82	▲16.07
AAP	Arvind Kejriwal	25,999	42.18	▼19.92
INC	Sandeep Dikshit	4,568	7.41	▲3.20
NOTA	None of the Above	314	0.51	▼0.01
Majority		4,089	6.82	▼19.69
Turnout		61,636	56.81	▲4.36
BJP gain from AAP		Swing	▲16.07	

2019 Indian general elections: West Delhi
Party	Candidate	Votes	%	±%
BJP	Parvesh Sahib Singh Verma	865,648	60.05	▲11.75
INC	Mahabal Mishra	2,87,162	19.92	▲5.59
AAP	Balbir Jakhar	2,51,873	17.47	▼10.91
BSP	Sita Saran Sen	13,269	0.92	▲0.49
NOTA	None of the Above	8,937	0.62	▲0.03
Majority		5,78,486	40.13	▲20.21
Turnout		14,42,492	60.82	▼5.28
BJP hold		Swing	▲11.75	

2014 Indian general elections: West Delhi
Party	Candidate	Votes	%	±%
BJP	Parvesh Sahib Singh Verma	651,395	48.30	▲8.58
AAP	Jarnail Singh	3,82,809	28.38	New
INC	Mahabal Mishra	1,93,266	14.33	▼39.99
IND.	Jarnail Singh	84,722	6.28	N/A
BSP	Raj Pal Singh	8,707	0.65	▼3.44
NOTA	None of the Above	7,932	0.59	N/A
Margin of victory		2,68,586	19.92	▲5.32
Turnout		13,47,971	66.10	▲13.76
BJP gain from INC		Swing	▼6.02	

2013 Delhi Legislative Assembly election – Mehrauli
Party	Candidate	Votes	Vote %
Bharatiya Janata Party	Parvesh Sahib Singh Verma	37,481	38.72
Aam Aadmi Party	Narinder Singh Sejwal	32,917	34.01
Indian National Congress	Dr. Yoganand Shastri	21,494	22.21
Bahujan Samaj Party	Surender Pawar	3,170	3.27
Nationalist Congress Party	Prem Dutt Sharma	644	0.67
Adarsh Citizen Party	Narender Singh	209	0.22
Independent	Bimlesh Kumar Jha	117	0.12
Independent	Anupam Kumar Sharma	105	0.11
NOTA	None of the Above	657	0.68
Total valid votes	—	96,794	100.00
Majority (margin)	—	4,564	4.72

== See also ==
- Manoj Tiwari
- Mundka
- Gautam Gambhir
- New Delhi
- Rekha Gupta Ministry
