= Dwarka, Delhi Assembly constituency =

Constituency of the Delhi legislative assembly in India

Coordinates: 28.575°N 77.050°E

Dwarka
- Constituency No. 33 for the Delhi Legislative Assembly

Constituency details
- Country: India
- Region: North India
- State: Delhi
- District: West Delhi
- Reservation: None

Member of Legislative Assembly
- 8th Delhi Legislative Assembly
- Incumbent Parduymn Rajput
- Party: Bharatiya Janata Party
- Elected year: 2025

Dwarka Assembly constituency is one of the 70 Delhi Legislative Assembly constituencies of the National Capital Territory in India.

== Overview ==
Dwarka constituency came into existence in 2008 as a part of the implementation of the recommendations of the Delimitation Commission of India constituted in 2002. This constituency covers part of Dwarka, Nasirpur Village, Dashrath Puri, Dabri, Delhi and Sagar Pur mainly. Dwarka is part of West Delhi Lok Sabha constituency along with nine other Assembly segments, namely, Madipur, Rajouri Garden, Hari Nagar, Tilak Nagar, Janakpuri, Vikaspuri, Uttam Nagar, Matiala and Najafgarh.

== Members of the Legislative Assembly ==
Election	Name	Party
2008	Mahabal Mishra	Indian National Congress
2009^	Parduymn Rajput	Bharatiya Janata Party
2013	Parduymn Rajput	Bharatiya Janata Party
2015	Adarsh Shastri	Aam Aadmi Party
2020	Vinay Mishra	Aam Aadmi Party
2025	Parduymn Rajput	Bharatiya Janata Party

== Election results ==
=== 2025 ===
Delhi Assembly elections, 2025: Dwarka
Party	Candidate	Votes	%	±%
BJP	Parduymn Rajput	69,137	49.56	▲7.86
AAP	Vinay Mishra	61,308	43.95	▼8.35
INC	Adarsh Shastri	6,773	4.86	▼0.15
NOTA	None of the above	729	0.30	
Majority		7,829	5.61	
Turnout		1,38,775	62.2	
BJP gain from AAP		Swing		

=== 2020 ===
Delhi Assembly elections, 2020: Dwarka
Party	Candidate	Votes	%	±%
AAP	Vinay Mishra	71,003	52.3	−6.77
BJP	Parduymn Rajput	56,616	41.7	+11.8
INC	Adarsh Shastri	6,757	5.0	−4.28
NOTA	None of the above	578	0.3	0.06
Majority		14,387	10.6	
Turnout		1,35,760	64.1	
AAP hold		Swing		

=== 2015 ===
Delhi Assembly elections, 2015: Dwarka
Party	Candidate	Votes	%	±%
AAP	Adarsh Shastri	79,729	59.07	+26.30
BJP	Parduymn Rajput	40,363	29.90	−7.40
INC	Mahabal Mishra	12,532	9.28	−11.22
BSP	Amit Chauhan	608	0.45	−1.09
NOTA	None of the above	332	0.24	−0.40
Majority		39,366	29.17	+24.63
Turnout		1,34,988	67.76	
AAP gain from BJP		Swing	+22.60	

=== 2013 ===
Delhi Assembly elections, 2013: Dwarka
Party	Candidate	Votes	%	±%
BJP	Parduymn Rajput	42,734	37.30	−17.56
AAP	Ravi Kumar Suryan	37,537	32.77	
INC	Tasveer Solanki	23,487	20.50	−16.99
NYP	Rajnish Kumar Jha	4,398	3.84	
JD(U)	Pramod Kumar	2,751	2.40	
BSP	Rajiv Kumar Gautam	1,760	1.54	
NOTA	None	729	0.64	
Majority		5,197	4.54	−12.83
Turnout		1,14,567	65.51	
BJP hold		Swing	-17.56	

=== 2009 By-election results ===
Delhi Legislative Assembly By-election, 2009: Dwarka
Party	Candidate	Votes	%	±%
BJP	Parduymn Rajput	35,891	54.86	+19.30
INC	Tilottama Chaudhary	24,526	37.49	−14.84
Independent	Madan Mohan	3,178	4.86	
Independent	Mordhwaj Rai	417	0.64	
Independent	Gulfan	332	0.51	
RJSP	Om Prakash Indora	286	0.44	
Independent	Suvash Kumar Chaudhary	234	0.36	
Independent	Rajesh Kumar Hotla	162	0.25	+0.11
BEP(R)	Hari Prakash	151	0.23	
BSKP	Naresh Chandra	85	0.13	
Independent	Mukesh Kumar Tanwar	60	0.09	−0.09
JKNPP	Prof R. N. Singh	51	0.08	
Independent	Anil Singh	45	0.07	0.00
Majority		11,365	17.37	+0.60
Turnout		65,418	46.56	−15.84
BJP gain from INC		Swing	+11.88	

=== 2008 ===
Delhi Assembly elections, 2008: Dwarka
Party	Candidate	Votes	%	±%
INC	Mahabal Mishra	43,608	52.33	
BJP	Parduymn Rajput	29,627	35.56	
BSP	Babu Ram	7,806	9.37	
CPI(M)	Mukesh Kumar Chaudhary	553	0.66	
Independent	Subhash Kumar Chaudhary	400	0.48	
RJD	Jogendra Singh	350	0.42	
SP	Kapil Kumar	225	0.27	
Independent	Rajesh Sinha	159	0.19	
Independent	Mukesh Kumar	150	0.18	
Independent	Om Prakash Indora	125	0.15	
Independent	Ramesh Kumar Hotla	120	0.14	
LJP	Vishnu Pathak	76	0.09	
Independent	Mukesh Kumar	69	0.08	
Independent	Anil Kumar Singh	57	0.07	
Majority		13,981	16.77	
Turnout		83,325	62.4	
INC win (new seat)				

== See also ==
- Dwarka
