= New Delhi Assembly constituency =

Constituency of Delhi, India

Coordinates: 28.635°N 77.204°E

New Delhi
- Constituency No. 40 for the Delhi Legislative Assembly

Constituency details
- Country: India
- Region: North India
- Union Territory: Delhi
- District: New Delhi
- Lok Sabha constituency: New Delhi
- Total electors: 1,46,750
- Reservation: None

Member of Legislative Assembly
- 8th Delhi Legislative Assembly
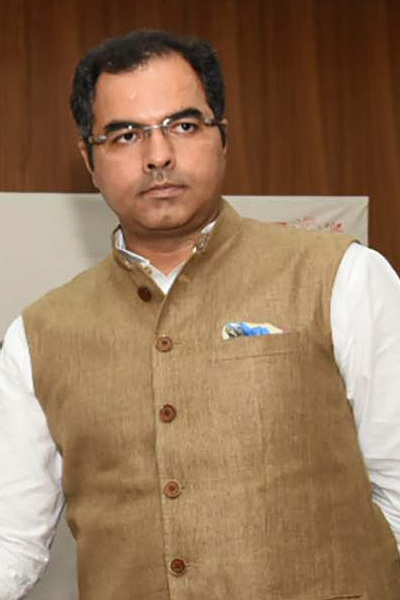
- Incumbent Parvesh Verma
- Party: BJP
- Elected year: 2025

New Delhi Assembly constituency, earlier known as New Delhi Constituency, is one of the seventy Delhi assembly constituencies of Delhi in northern India. New Delhi assembly constituency is a part of New Delhi Lok Sabha constituency. This constituency was created by reorganisation by delimitation commission in 2008. Voter-verified paper audit trail (VVPAT) was used along with EVMs in New Delhi assembly constituency in the 2013 Delhi Legislative Assembly election and 2015 Delhi Legislative Assembly election Delhi elections.

== Members of the Legislative Assembly ==
Most Successful M.L.A.s from New Delhi Vidhan Sabha
1. Sheila Dixit(INC)( 3 Times) (37.5%)
2. Arvind Kejriwal(AAP)( 3 Times) (37.5%)
3. Kirti Azad(BJP)( 1 Time) Parvesh Verma(BJP)( 1 Time) (25.0%)
4. 0.00%
5. 0.00%
6. 0.00%
7. 0.00%
8. 0.00%

Year	Member	Party
Known as Gole Market before delimitation
1993	Kirti Azad	Bharatiya Janata Party
1998	Sheila Dikshit	Indian National Congress
2003	Sheila Dikshit	Indian National Congress
Known as New Delhi after delimitation
2008	Sheila Dikshit	Indian National Congress
2013	Arvind Kejriwal	Aam Aadmi Party
2015	Arvind Kejriwal	Aam Aadmi Party
2020	Arvind Kejriwal	Aam Aadmi Party
2025	Parvesh Verma	Bharatiya Janata Party

== Election results ==
Vote share of winning candidates
2025	48.82%
2020	61.10%
2015	64.34%
2013	53.46%
2008	52.20%

=== 2025 ===
2025 Delhi Legislative Assembly election: New Delhi
Party	Candidate	Votes	%	±%
BJP	Parvesh Verma	30,088	48.82	▲16.07
AAP	Arvind Kejriwal	25,999	42.18	▼19.92
INC	Sandeep Dikshit	4,568	7.41	▲3.20
NOTA	None of the Above	314	0.51	▼0.01
Majority		4,089	6.82	▼19.69
Turnout		61,636	56.81	▲4.36
BJP gain from AAP		Swing	▲16.07	

=== 2020 ===
2020 Delhi Legislative Assembly election: New Delhi
Party	Candidate	Votes	%	±%
AAP	Arvind Kejriwal	46,758	61.10	−3.24
BJP	Sunil Kumar Yadav	25,061	32.75	+3.94
INC	Romesh Sabharwal	3,220	4.21	−1.16
NOTA	None of the Above	395	0.52	−
Majority		21,697	28.35	−7.16
Turnout		76,645	52.45	−12.27
Registered electors		1,48,574		
AAP hold		Swing	-3.24	

=== 2015 ===
2015 Delhi Legislative Assembly election: New Delhi
Party	Candidate	Votes	%	±%
AAP	Arvind Kejriwal	57,213	64.34	+10.88
BJP	Nupur Sharma	25,630	28.81	+7.13
INC	Kiran Walia	4,781	5.37	−16.86
NOTA	None of the Above	465	0.52	−0.04
Majority		31,583	35.51	+4.27
Turnout		89,265	64.72	
Registered electors		1,37,294		
AAP hold		Swing	+10.88	

=== 2013 ===
2013 Delhi Legislative Assembly election: New Delhi
Party	Candidate	Votes	%	±%
AAP	Arvind Kejriwal	44,269	53.46	New
INC	Sheila Dikshit	18,405	22.23	−29.97
BJP	Vijender Gupta	17,952	21.68	−12.17
BSP	Ritu Singh	605	0.73	−7.38
NOTA	None of the above	460	0.56	
Majority		25,864	31.24	+12.89
Turnout		83,059	66.93	
AAP gain from INC		Swing	+41.72	

=== 2008 ===
2008 Delhi Legislative Assembly election: New Delhi
Party	Candidate	Votes	%	±%
INC	Sheila Dikshit	39,781	52.20	
BJP	Vijay Jolly	25,799	33.85	
BSP	Rajiv Singh	6,179	8.11	
Majority		13,982	18.35	
Turnout		76,203	56.22	
INC win (new seat)				
