= Dabri Chhoti =

- village
- Location within Rajasthan Location within India
- Coordinates: 28.84426°N 74.915986°E
- Country: India
- State: Rajasthan
- District: Churu district
- Elevation: 431 m (1,414 ft)

Population (2011)
  - Total: approximately 600

Languages
  - Official: Hindi
- Time zone: UTC+5:30 (IST)
- PIN: 331302
- Telephone code: 911561
- ISO 3166 code: RJ-IN
- Vehicle registration: RJ-04

Dabri Chhoti is a village in Churu district, Rajasthan, India, situated on the road between Taranagar and Sahwa.and sahwa 15 km away from village, on State highway 15. The village is within the municipality (tehsil) of Taranagar (and taranagar 24 km (15 mi) away from village) and the Gram panchayat of Kalwas and kalwas 9 km (5.6 mi) away from village] Water pump on Dabri chhoti bus stand . And 1.5 km (0.93 mi) distance from village to highway
