= Hari Nagar Assembly constituency =

Constituency of the Delhi legislative assembly in India

Coordinates: 28.626°N 77.111°E

Hari Nagar
- Constituency No. 28 for the Delhi Legislative Assembly

Constituency details
- Country: India
- Region: North India
- State: Delhi
- Lok Sabha constituency: West Delhi
- Established: 1951
- Reservation: None

Member of Legislative Assembly
- 8th Delhi Legislative Assembly
- Incumbent Shyam Sharma
- Party: Bharatiya Janata Party
- Elected year: 2025

Hari Nagar/H-Town is one of the 70 Delhi Legislative Assembly constituencies of the National Capital Territory in northern India. It is also known as H-Town.

== Overview ==
Present geographical structure of Hari Nagar constituency came into existence in 2008 as a part of the implementation of the recommendations of the Delimitation Commission of India constituted in 2002.

Hari Nagar is part of West Delhi Lok Sabha constituency along with nine other Assembly segments, namely, Uttam Nagar, Rajouri Garden, Madipur, Tilak Nagar, Janakpuri, Vikaspuri, Dwarka, Matiala and Najafgarh.

== Members of Legislative Assembly ==
Year	Member	Party
1993	Harsharan Singh Balli	Bharatiya Janata Party
1998	Harsharan Singh Balli	Bharatiya Janata Party
2003	Harsharan Singh Balli	Bharatiya Janata Party
2008	Harsharan Singh Balli	Bharatiya Janata Party
2013	Jagdeep Singh	Aam Aadmi Party
2015	Jagdeep Singh	Aam Aadmi Party
2020	Raj Kumari Dhillon	Aam Aadmi Party
2025	Shyam Sharma	Bharatiya Janata Party

== Election results ==
=== 2025 ===
Delhi Assembly elections, 2025: Hari Nagar
Party	Candidate	Votes	%	±%
BJP	Shyam Sharma	50,179	48.7	▲13.63
AAP	Surinder Kumar Setia	43,547	42.3	▼11.37
INC	Prem Sharma	4,252	4.1	▼5.5
Independent	Raj Kumari Dhillon	3,398	3.3	
NOTA	None of the above	713	0.4	
Majority		6,632	6.5	▼12.17
Turnout		1,02,327	60.9	▼0.96
BJP hold		Swing	BJP	

=== 2020 ===
Delhi Assembly elections, 2020: Hari Nagar
Party	Candidate	Votes	%	±%
AAP	Raj Kumari Dhillon	58,087	53.67	−4.75
BJP	Tajinder Bagga	37,956	35.07	
INC	Surinder Kumar Setia	10,394	9.60	+4.08
NOTA	None of the above	592	0.55	+0.03
Majority		20,131	18.67	
Turnout		1,08,375	61.86	−6.44
AAP hold		Swing	-4.75	

=== 2015 ===
Delhi Assembly elections, 2015: Hari Nagar
Party	Candidate	Votes	%	±%
AAP	Jagdeep Singh	65,814	58.42	+19.61
SAD	Avtar Singh Hit	39,318	34.90	+4.94
INC	Chander Prakash	6,221	5.52	−17.53
BSP	Jai Prakash Manav	559	0.49	−1.38
SS	Baljeet Kaur	152	0.13	N/A
NOTA	None of the above	591	0.52	−0.40
Majority		26,496	23.52	+14.67
Turnout		1,11,805	68.30	
AAP hold		Swing	+19.61	

=== 2013 ===
Delhi Assembly elections, 2013: Hari Nagar
Party	Candidate	Votes	%	±%
AAP	Jagdeep Singh	38,912	38.81	
SAD	Shyam Sharma	30,036	29.96	
INC	Harsharan Singh Balli	23,111	23.05	−4.53
Independent	Satpal Singh	4,649	4.64	
BSP	Shubh Karan	1,874	1.87	−6.02
JD(U)	Raj Lakshmi Sharma	464	0.46	
RBHP	Neeraj Kapoor	295	0.29	
NOTA	None	919	0.92	
Majority		8,876	8.85	−26.24
Turnout		1,00,295	66.69	
AAP gain from BJP		Swing		

=== 2008 ===
Delhi Assembly elections, 2008: Hari Nagar
Party	Candidate	Votes	%	±%
BJP	Harsharan Singh Balli	51,364	62.67	+7.81
INC	Ramesh Lamba	22,606	27.58	−15.98
BSP	Prem Sharma	6,464	7.89	
Independent	Sumit Chugh	401	0.49	
JD(U)	Feroz Khan	287	0.35	
Independent	Rajinder Singh	212	0.26	
Independent	Jasvinder Singh	198	0.24	
Independent	Satish Kapoor	175	0.21	
Independent	Gurpreet Singh	133	0.16	
Independent	Chandra Prakash	114	0.14	
Majority		28,758	35.09	−23.79
Turnout		81,954	57.2	−1.41
BJP hold		Swing	+7.81	

=== 2003 ===
Delhi Assembly elections, 2003: Hari Nagar
Party	Candidate	Votes	%	±%
BJP	Harsharan Singh Balli	32,971	54.86	+5.08
INC	O P Wadhwa Advocate	26,180	43.56	−5.18
Independent	Ambika	342	0.57	
NCP	Prakash Chauhan	281	0.47	
Independent	Brij Raj Bhola	138	0.23	
Independent	Devender Singh Yadav	105	0.17	
Independent	Gulshan Kumar	85	0.14	
Majority		6,791	11.30	+10.25
Turnout		60,102	58.61	+6.98
BJP hold		Swing	+5.07	

=== 1998 ===
Delhi Assembly elections, 1998: Hari Nagar
Party	Candidate	Votes	%	±%
BJP	Harsharan Singh Balli	29,136	49.79	−9.56
INC	O P Wadhwa	28,519	48.74	+21.59
SP	Rajinder Singh	333	0.57	
JD	Afroz Khan	242	0.41	−4.73
Independent	Navrung Paul	129	0.22	
Independent	Pankaj Kumar	110	0.19	
Independent	Ashwani Khanna	49	0.08	
Majority		617	1.05	−31.15
Turnout		58,518	51.63	−11.12
BJP hold		Swing	-9.56	

=== 1993 ===
Delhi Assembly elections, 1993: Hari Nagar
Party	Candidate	Votes	%	±%
BJP	Harsharan Singh Balli	31,150	59.35	
INC	Onkar Singh Thapar	14,251	27.15	
JD	Gurcharan Singh Bannar	2,697	5.14	
BSP	Gurudayal	997	1.90	
IC(S)	Jai Dev Vashist	778	1.48	
SS	Satish Kumar Murria	722	1.38	
Independent	Jayant T George	479	0.91	
Independent	Hemat Kumar Bhardwan	328	0.62	
Independent	Om Prakash Baradia	213	0.41	
Independent	Shiv Kumar	156	0.30	
Independent	Kanwaljit Singh	89	0.17	
Independent	Harjeet Singh Romi	79	0.15	
Independent	Deepak Sabharwal	66	0.13	
Independent	D C Baradia	60	0.11	
Doordarshi Party	Raj Pal	57	0.11	
Independent	Om Narain Singh	55	0.10	
Independent	Iqbal Singh	51	0.10	
Independent	Manjit Singh	50	0.10	
Independent	Sunita Sharma	44	0.08	
Independent	Avtar Singh	31	0.06	
Independent	Shubh Chintak Kumar	23	0.04	
Independent	Anjna Kohli	19	0.04	
Independent	Jasbir Singh	15	0.03	
Independent	Chander Prakash	14	0.03	
Independent	Pradeep Sahni	12	0.02	
Independent	D L Bhatia	11	0.02	
Independent	K S Walia	10	0.02	
Independent	Balbir Singh Bir	9	0.02	
Independent	S N Premi	9	0.02	
Independent	Sudarshan Khurana	7	0.01	
Majority		16,899	32.20	
Turnout		52,482	62.75	
BJP hold		Swing		
