= Kamaljeet Sehrawat =

Indian politician

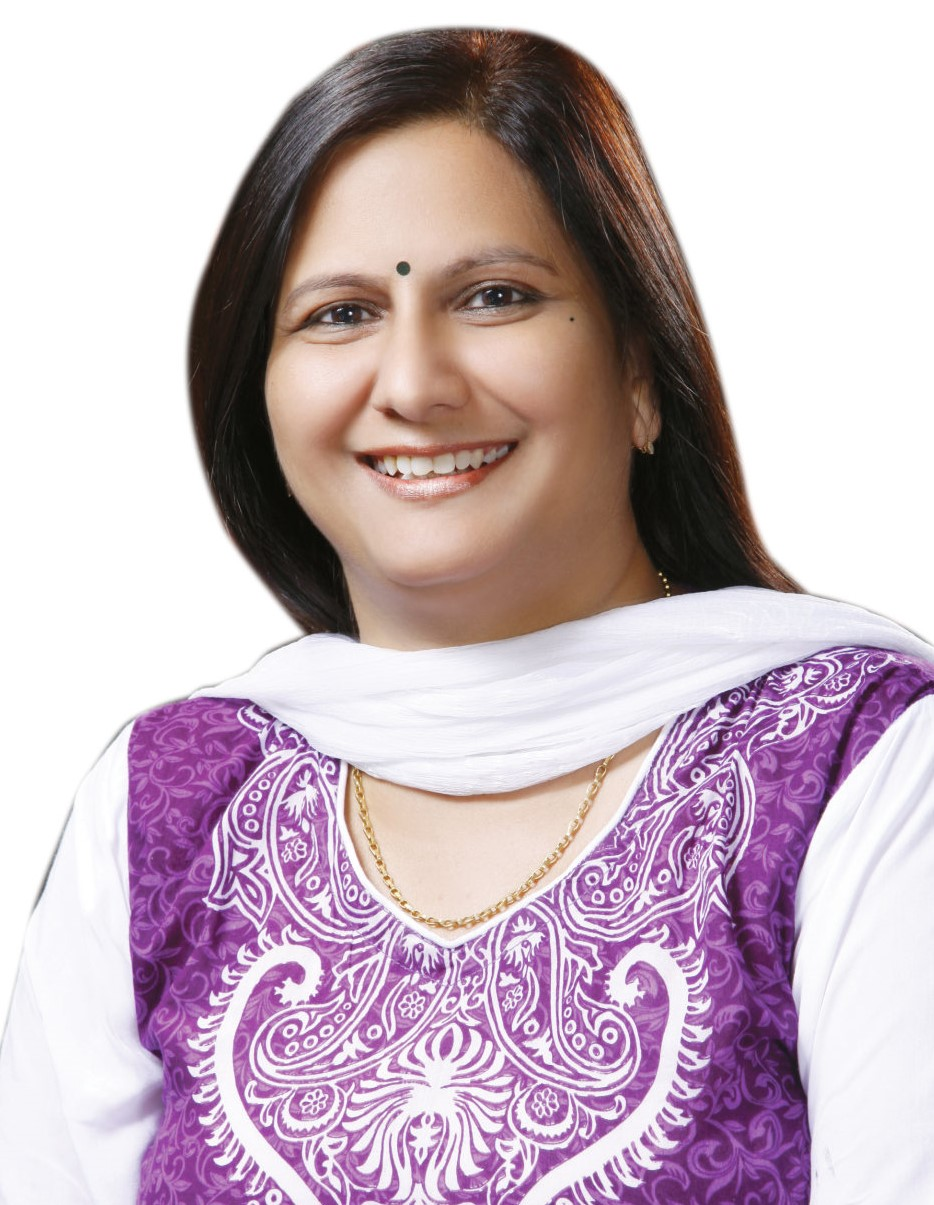

Member of Parliament, Lok Sabha
- Incumbent
- Assumed office 4 June 2024
- Preceded by: Parvesh Verma
- Constituency: West Delhi

Mayor of South Delhi Municipal Corporation
- In office 2018–2019
- Preceded by: Shyam Sharma
- Succeeded by: Narendra Chawla
- Constituency: Councillor, Dwarka B Ward - New Delhi

Personal details
- Born: 29 September 1972 (age 54)
- Party: Bharatiya Janata Party
- Spouse: Rajkumar Sehrawat
- Children: 2
- Education: M.Com, Himachal Pradesh University
- Profession: Politician, Farmer

Kamaljeet Sehrawat (born 29 September 1972) is an Indian politician and social activist. She is a member of the Lok Sabha from West Delhi as a Bharatiya Janta Party representative.

== Political career ==
Sehrawat assumed the role of BJP district vice president in Najafgarh in 2007. She contested the MLA election from the Matiala Assembly constituency in 2008 but lost to Sumesh Shokeen of Indian National Congress by 6,629 votes. From 2009 to 2014, she served as the secretary of the Delhi Pradesh BJP. She ascended to the presidency of the BJP Delhi Mahila Morcha from 2014 to 2016.

In 2014, she was selected as the nominee for mayor of South Delhi Municipal Corporation. Between 2016 and 2017, Sehrawat was BJP’s vice president of Delhi State. In 2022, Sehrawat won Councillor election from Dwarka B ward.

Sehrawat served as the vice president of the BJP's Delhi State from 2016 to 2017, contributing to the party's strategic planning and outreach efforts. Subsequently, she was elected as a member of the Standing Committee in 2018.

Sehrawat was selected as the BJP candidate for the West Delhi in the 2024 Lok Sabha elections.

== Political contributions and initiatives ==
Sehrawat has been actively involved in advocating for women's empowerment and has led various campaigns and programs aimed at improving the status of women in society. Serving as the president of the BJP Delhi Mahila Morcha, she concentrated on increasing women's involvement in politics and ensuring their representation across different levels of governances.

During her tenure as the mayor of the South Delhi Municipal Corporation, Sehrawat launched several initiatives focused on enhancing civic infrastructure and services. These included cleanliness drives, waste management programs, and projects aimed at beautifying the city, all aimed at improving the overall quality of life for residents. Additionally, she emphasized the development of parks, recreational facilities, and green spaces to foster a healthier and more sustainable urban environment.

As the vice president of the BJP's Delhi State, Sehrawat played a significant role in formulating and executing the party's election strategy, rallying support, and expanding its grassroots network.

== Personal life ==
She is married to Raj Kumar Sehrawat.
