= Shyam Sharma (politician) =

Indian politician

Member of Delhi Legislative Assembly
- Incumbent
- Assumed office 2025
- Preceded by: Raj Kumari Dhillon
- Constituency: Hari Nagar

Personal details
- Political party: Bharatiya Janata Party

Shyam Sharma is an Indian politician from Bharatiya Janata Party from Delhi. He was elected as a Member of the Legislative Assembly in the 8th Delhi Assembly from Hari Nagar Assembly constituency.

== Education ==
He passed Matriculation from National Institute of Open Schooling in 2013.
