= Swarana Kanta Sharma =

Judge of the High Court of Delhi

The Honourable Justice Swarana Kanta Sharma न्यायमूर्ति स्वर्ण कांता शर्मा
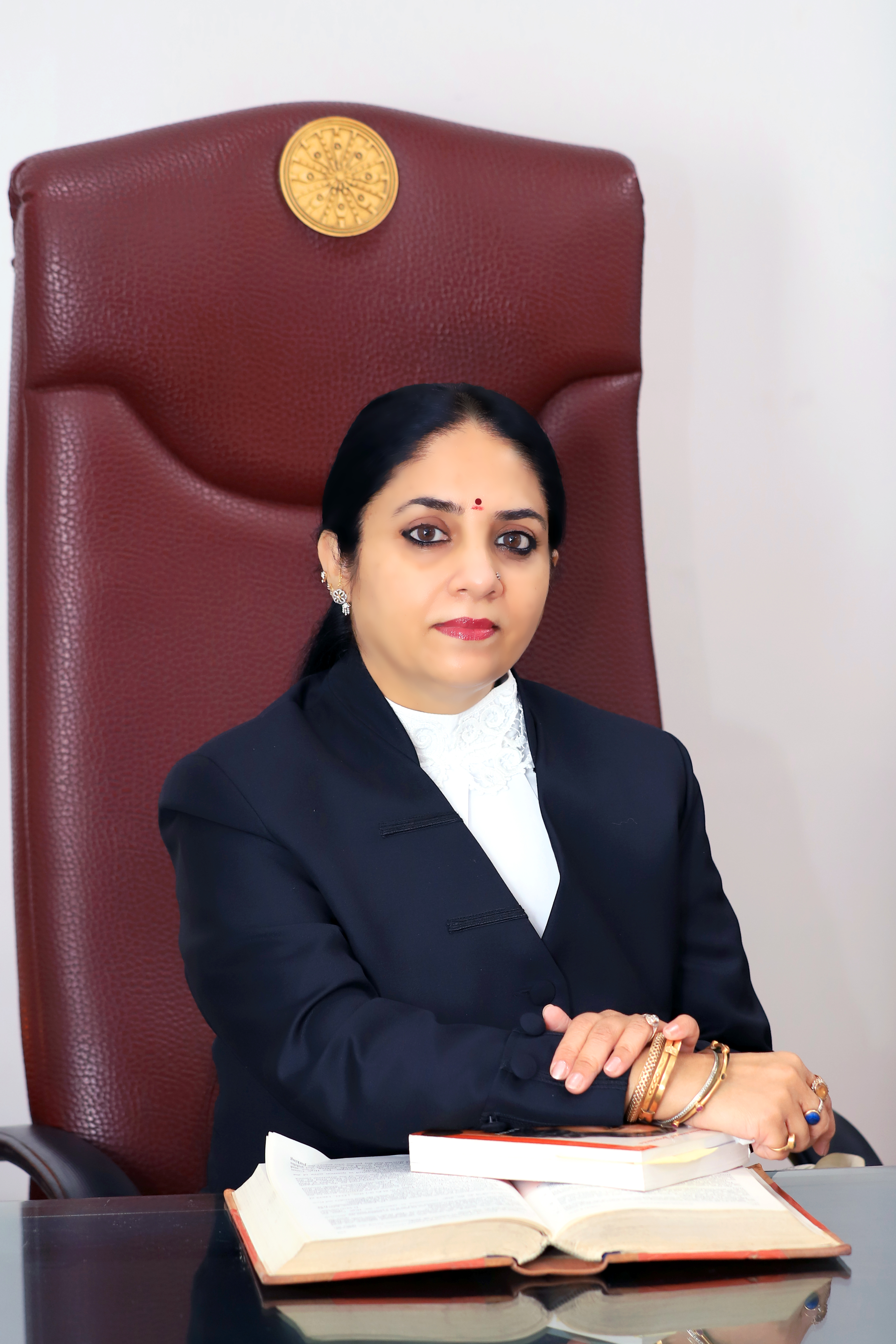
- Official portrait

Judge of Delhi High Court
- Incumbent
- Assumed office 28 March 2022
- Nominated by: N. V. Ramana
- Appointed by: Droupadi Murmu

Judge-cum-Special Judge (CBI) at Rouse Avenue Court
- In office November 2019 – March 2022

Personal details
- Education: University of Delhi (B.A. (Hons.),LL.B.,LL.M.); Commonwealth Education Trust (PhD)
- Occupation: Judge
- Profession: Law

Justice Swarana Kanta Sharma is a judge of the Delhi High Court, in India. She was elevated to the bench on 28 March 2022. She is recognized for her extensive judicial career, starting as a Magistrate at age 24 and becoming a Sessions Judge by age 35.

== Education ==
Sharma holds an LL.B. from Delhi University (1991), an LL.M. (2004), and a Ph.D. in Judicial Education (2025).

== Delhi Liquor scam ==
Sharma came in national limelight during hearing of Aam Aadmi Party leader Arvind Kejriwal and others, where Kejriwal and other accused moved application for recusal before her because she was attended RSS organized meetings. While Sharma initially rejected the application, citing judicial requirements. Later on 14 May 2026, Sharma initiated criminal contempt proceedings against 06 AAP leaders, Arvind Kejriwal, Manish Sisodia, Sanjay Singh, Vinay Mishra, Durgesh Pathak and Saurabh Bharadwaj. She said that they had posted defamatory, contemptuous and vilifying things against her, calling it contemptuous of Court. On 19 May, the Delhi High Court issued notice to these leaders in the given criminal contempt proceedings.
