= Palam metro station =

Metro station in Delhi, India

Palam

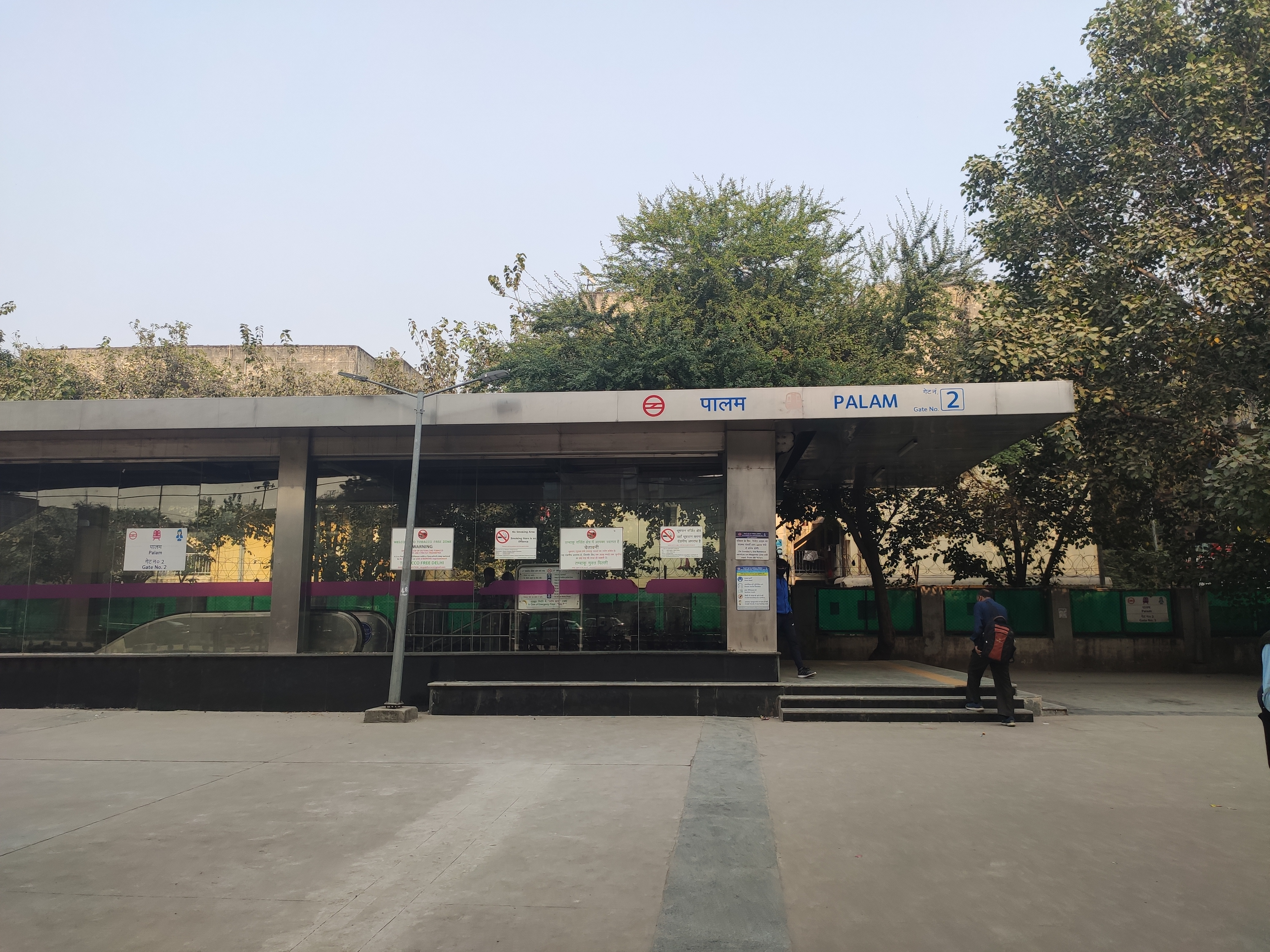

General information
- Location: Block J, Palam Colony, Delhi, 110045
- Coordinates: 28°35′N 77°05′E
- System: Delhi Metro station
- Owner: Delhi Metro
- Operator: Delhi Metro Rail Corporation (DMRC)
- Line: Magenta Line
- Platforms: Island Platform; Platform-1 → Botanical Garden; Platform-2 → Inderlok
- Tracks: 2

Construction
- Structure type: Underground, Double-track
- Platform levels: 2
- Accessible: Yes

Other information
- Status: Staffed, Operational
- Station code: PALM

History
- Opened: 29 May 2018; 8 years ago
- Electrified: 25 kV 50 Hz AC through overhead catenary

Services
Preceding station	Delhi Metro	Following station
Dashrathpuri towards Inderlok	Magenta Line	Sadar Bazar Cantonment towards Botanical Garden
Route map
Location

The Palam metro station is a part of the Magenta Line, connecting Botanical Garden in Noida to Janakpuri West in West Delhi. It was opened to public on 29 May 2018.

== Station layout ==
G	Street Level	Exit/ Entrance
C	Concourse	Fare control, station agent, Ticket/token, shops
P	Platform 1 Eastbound	Towards → Botanical Garden; Next Station: Sadar Bazar Cantonment
P	Island platform | Doors will open on the right
P	Platform 2 Westbound	Towards ← Inderlok; Next Station: Dashrathpuri

== Entry/exit ==
Palam metro station Entry/exits
Gate No-1	Gate No-2	Gate No-3
Towards Manglapuri Bus Terminal	Palam Colony	Towards Palam Police station
	Towards Raj Nagar	Palam Village
	Manglapuri	

== Features ==
Under Phase III, Palam metro station is an underground station which has several first-of-its-kind features. In a first for a Metro station, Palam has parking space for 66 e-rickshaws where around six to seven charging points will be provided. E-rickshaws, apart from the Metro feeders, have emerged as a crucial link in the last-mile connectivity to and from metro stations in the city.

The station also has unique art installations. The passage between exit gates two and three, which has already been opened for public to use as a subway to cross the road, has a rooftop installation depicting the blue sky, while the walls are decked with handmade ceramic tiles.

There is also a heavy use of glass separators to divide the station area. The division at the automatic fare collection (AFC) gates will also help control crowd and facilitate faster entry and exit.

== Gallery ==
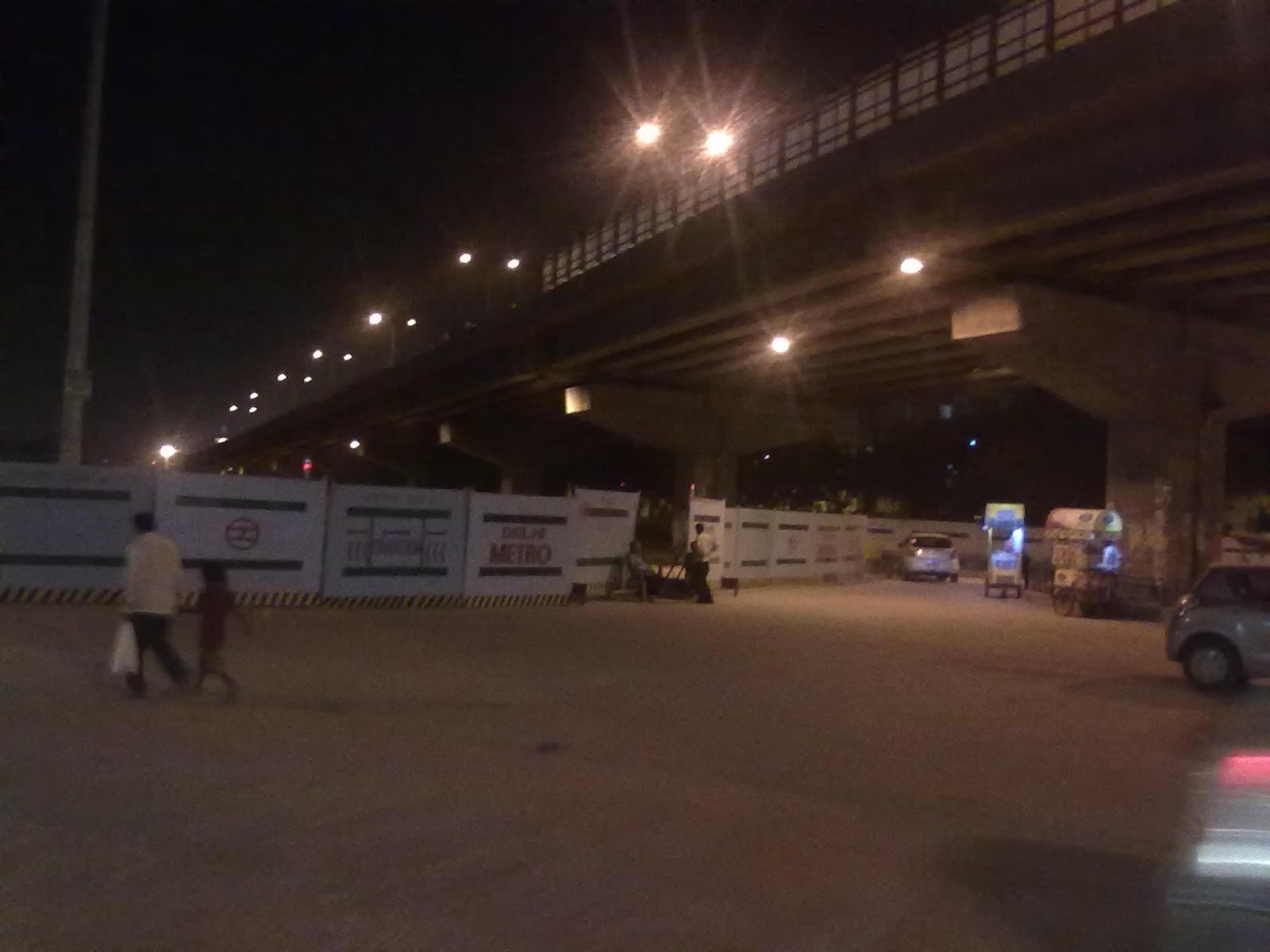
Palam metro station under construction

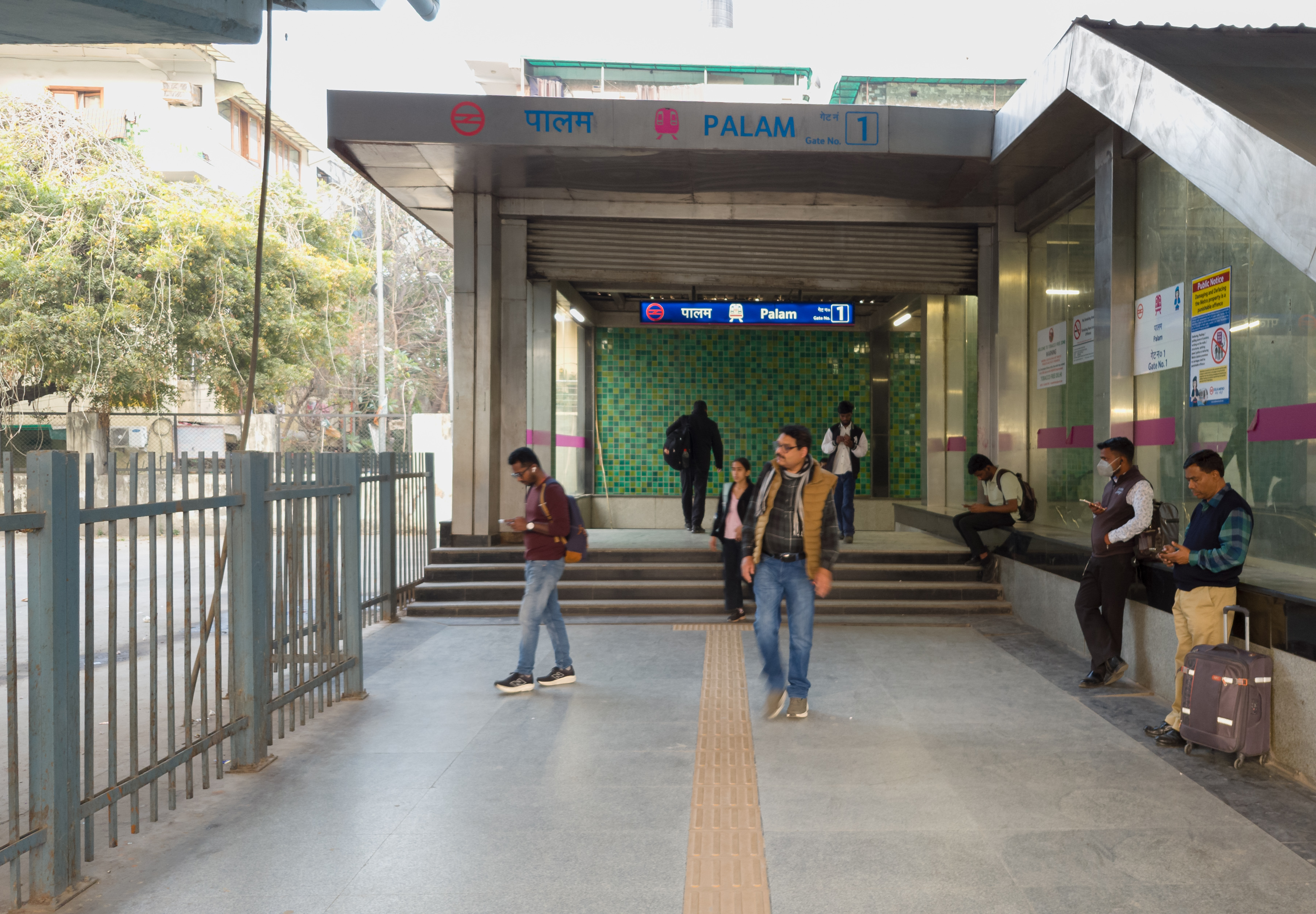
Gate No. 1

== Connections ==
The Janakpuri West – Botanical Garden corridor passing through Palam metro station. The station connects important locations such as the Indira Gandhi International Airport – Domestic Terminal, Hauz Khas, IIT Delhi, Nehru Place, Jamia Milia University and Noida.

=== Rail ===
Palam railway station of Indian Railways is also situated nearby this metro station.

== See also ==
- Delhi
- Palam
- List of Delhi Metro stations
- Transport in Delhi
- Delhi Metro Rail Corporation
- Delhi Suburban Railway
- Delhi Monorail
- Indira Gandhi International Airport
- Delhi Transport Corporation
- South West Delhi
- National Capital Region (India)
- List of rapid transit systems
- List of metro systems
