= Jagdeep Singh (politician) =

Indian politician

Delhi Legislative Assembly
- Constituency: Hari Nagar

Personal details
- Born: 31 May 1971 (age 55)
- Party: Aam Aadmi Party

Jagdeep Singh is an Indian politician belonging to Aam Aadmi Party. He won as an M.L.A from Hari Nagar constituency of Delhi.

== Personal life ==
Jagdeep Singh was born on 31 May 1971 in Ambala Cantonment, Haryana. His father's name is Jagdish Singh. He has passed 12th standard from National Open School, Delhi in 1993 and is a licentiate. He owns an insurance business. Jagdeep Singh is married to Raminder Kaur, who is self-employed. They have a daughter Kirat Kaur and a son named Swaraj Singh. He is a Sikh by religion. His hobby is listening to music. He has three criminal cases filed against him.

== Politics ==
It is believed that Jagdeep Singh won the MLA seat only because of the political disturbance between sitting MLA Harsharan Singh Balli and BJP. Harsharan Singh Balli being the only politician having an influence in Hari Nagar constituency, his absence in the vidhansabha elections got Jagdeep Singh from AAP major victories both times. Jagdeep Singh won the Hari Nagar Assembly constituency in 2013 Delhi Legislative Assembly election by polling 38,912 votes. He defeated the joint of Bharatiya Janata Party (BJP) and Shiromani Akali Dal (SAD), Shyam Sharma of the SAD by a margin of 8,876 votes. He also defeated the four-time sitting MLA from the BJP, Harsharan Singh Balli, who joined the Indian National Congress (INC) after being refused a ticket by the BJP. The middle-class and Sikh dominated Hari Nagar has low cost DDA houses as well as wealthy kothis.

Singh retained the seat in 2015 elections. He almost doubled the votes he received (65,814) and defeated his nearest rival Avtar Singh Hit of the SAD (who contested under the BJP election symbol) by a margin of 26,496. It was described as AAP's "most monumental victory" in Sikh-dominated seats. Hit, a former president of SAD's Delhi unit and also of the Delhi Sikh Gurdwara Management Committee (DSGMC), was considered a weak contender against Singh, due to the delay in his election campaign and low connect with voters; while Singh had the opportunity to win in the absence of Harsharan Singh Balli. Jagdeep Singh admits that had it been Harsharan Singh Balli he was contesting, he would not have the slightest chance of winning.
