= Kalwas =

- village
- Location in Rajasthan, India Kalwas (India)
- Coordinates: 28°46′0″N 74°30′0″E
- Country: India
- State: Rajasthan
- District: Churu

Languages
  - Official: Hindi
- Time zone: UTC+5:30 (IST)
- ISO 3166 code: RJ-IN
- Vehicle registration: RJ-
- Nearest city: Taranagar

Kalwas is a village located in Taranagar subdistrict, Churu district, Rajasthan, India which is situated on the road between Taranagar and Sahawa. As of 2011 it had 528 households and a population of 2,884.
