= Gulab Singh Yadav =

Indian politician

Member of the Delhi Legislative Assembly
- In office 14 February 2015 – 2025
- Preceded by: Rajesh Gahlot
- Succeeded by: Sandeep Sehrawat
- Constituency: Matiala

Personal details
- Born: 30 October 1978 (age 47) Delhi, India
- Party: Aam Aadmi Party
- Education: National Institute of Open Schooling
- Profession: Businessman & politician

Gulab Singh Yadav is an Indian politician and a former MLA from the Matiala (Delhi Assembly) constituency. He represented the Matiala constituency as a member of the Aam Aadmi Party.

== Early life and education ==
Gulab Singh Yadav was born in Delhi. He attended the National Institute of Open Schooling and is educated till twelfth grade.

== Political career ==
Gulab Singh Yadav is a MLA for two terms. He represents the Matiala constituency and is a member of the Aam Aadmi Party political party. On 21 November 2022, he was beaten in a public gathering by his own party workers accusing him of selling the coveted tickets for contesting MCD elections.

== Posts held ==
#	From	To	Position	Comments
01	2015	2025	Member, Sixth Legislative Assembly of Delhi	

== Electoral Performance ==
Delhi Assembly elections, 2013: Matiala
Party	Candidate	Votes	%	±%
BJP	Rajesh Gahlot	70,053	36.10	+1.05
AAP	Gulab Singh Yadav	66,051	34.05	
INC	Sumesh Shokeen	48,358	24.93	−15.21
Independent	Satendra Singh Rana	2,718	1.40	
BSP	Sri Niwas Yadav	2,411	1.24	−13.65
SP	Narender Yadav	743	0.38	−0.32
NOTA	None	636	0.33	
Majority		4,002	2.06	−3.02
Turnout		1,94,228	64.13	
BJP gain from INC		Swing	+1.05	

Delhi Assembly elections, 2015: Matiala
Party	Candidate	Votes	%	±%
AAP	Gulab Singh Yadav	1,27,665	54.93	+20.88
BJP	Rajesh Gahlot	80,661	34.71	−1.40
INC	Sumesh Shokeen	20,284	8.72	−16.21
BSP	Sanjay Kumar	723	0.31	−0.93
NOTA	None of the above	1,102	0.47	+0.14
Majority		47,004	20.22	+18.16
Turnout		2,32,829	67.02	
AAP gain from BJP		Swing	+20.18	

Delhi Assembly elections, 2020: Matiala
Party	Candidate	Votes	%	±%
AAP	Gulab Singh Yadav	139,010	53.20	−1.73
BJP	Rajesh Gahlot	1,10,935	42.45	+7.74
INC	Sumesh Shokeen	7,317	2.81	−5.91
BSP	Sher Singh	774	0.30	−0.01
None of the Above	None of the above	1,602	0.61	+0.14
Majority		28,075	10.75	−9.47
Turnout		2,61,598	61.56	−5.46
AAP hold		Swing		

== See also ==
- Delhi Legislative Assembly
- Matiala (Delhi Assembly constituency)
- Sixth Legislative Assembly of Delhi

State Legislative Assembly
Preceded by Rajesh Gahlot (BJP)	Member of the Delhi Legislative Assembly from Matiala Assembly constituency 2015– 2025	Succeeded by Sandeep Sehrawat (BJP)
