= Matiala Assembly constituency =

Legislative assembly seat in Delhi

Coordinates: 28.610°N 77.051°E

Matiala
- Constituency No. 34 for the Delhi Legislative Assembly

Constituency details
- Country: India
- Region: North India
- State: Delhi
- District: South West Delhi
- Lok Sabha constituency: West Delhi
- Established: 2008
- Reservation: None

Member of Legislative Assembly
- 8th Delhi Legislative Assembly
- Incumbent Sandeep Sehrawat
- Party: Bharatiya Janata Party
- Elected year: 2025

Matiala Assembly constituency is one of the 70 Delhi Legislative Assembly constituencies of the National Capital Territory in northern India. Sandeep Sehrawat of Bhartiya Janta Party is the MLA from Matiala since 2025.

== Overview ==
Present geographical structure of Matiala constituency came into existence in 2008 (Constituency didn't exist before 2008) as a part of the implementation of the recommendations of the Delimitation Commission of India constituted in 2002. Matiala is part of West Delhi Lok Sabha constituency along with nine other Assembly segments, namely, Uttam Nagar, Rajouri Garden, Hari Nagar, Tilak Nagar, Janakpuri, Vikaspuri, Dwarka, Madipur and Najafgarh.

== Members of Legislative Assembly ==
Election	Member	Party
2008	Sumesh Shokeen	Indian National Congress
2013	Rajesh Gehlot	Bharatiya Janata Party
2015	Gulab Singh Yadav	Aam Aadmi Party
2020	Gulab Singh Yadav	Aam Aadmi Party
2025	Sandeep Sehrawat	Bharatiya Janata Party

== Election results ==
=== 2025 ===
Delhi Assembly elections, 2025: Matiala
Party	Candidate	Votes	%	±%
BJP	Sandeep Sehrawat	146,295	52.46	▲10.01
AAP	Sumesh Shokeen	117,572	42.16	▼11.04
INC	Raghuvinder Shokeen	9,685	3.47	▲0.66
NOTA	None of the above	2,018	0.72	
Majority		28,723	10.30	▼0.45
Turnout		278,894		
BJP gain from AAP		Swing		

=== 2020 ===
Delhi Assembly elections, 2020: Matiala
Party	Candidate	Votes	%	±%
AAP	Gulab Singh Yadav	139,010	53.20	−1.73
BJP	Rajesh Gahlot	1,10,935	42.45	+7.74
INC	Sumesh Shokeen	7,317	2.81	−5.91
BSP	Sher Singh	774	0.30	−0.01
None of the Above	None of the above	1,602	0.61	+0.14
Majority		28,075	10.75	−9.47
Turnout		2,61,598	61.56	−5.46
AAP hold		Swing		

=== 2015 ===
Delhi Assembly elections, 2015: Matiala
Party	Candidate	Votes	%	±%
AAP	Gulab Singh Yadav	1,27,665	54.93	+20.88
BJP	Rajesh Gahlot	80,661	34.71	−1.40
INC	Sumesh Shokeen	20,284	8.72	−16.21
BSP	Sanjay Kumar	723	0.31	−0.93
NOTA	None of the above	1,102	0.47	+0.14
Majority		47,004	20.22	+18.16
Turnout		2,32,829	67.02	
AAP gain from BJP		Swing	+20.18	

=== 2013 ===
Delhi Assembly elections, 2013: Matiala
Party	Candidate	Votes	%	±%
BJP	Rajesh Gahlot	70,053	36.10	+1.05
AAP	Gulab Singh Yadav	66,051	34.05	
INC	Sumesh Shokeen	48,358	24.93	−15.21
Independent	Satendra Singh Rana	2,718	1.40	
BSP	Sri Niwas Yadav	2,411	1.24	−13.65
SP	Narender Yadav	743	0.38	−0.32
NOTA	None	636	0.33	
Majority		4,002	2.06	−3.02
Turnout		1,94,228	64.13	
BJP gain from INC		Swing	+1.05	

=== 2008 ===
Delhi Assembly elections, 2008: Matiala
Party	Candidate	Votes	%	±%
INC	Sumesh Shokeen	52,411	40.14	
BJP	Kamaljeet Sehrawat	45,782	35.06	
BSP	Manoj Bhardwaj	19,442	14.89	
Independent	Rao Satvir Singh	8,883	6.80	
BRSP	Nidhi Mahajan	1,224	0.94	
SP	Anita	911	0.70	
Majority		6,629	5.08	
Turnout		130,569	58.5	
INC win (new seat)				
