= Sandeep Sehrawat =

Indian politician

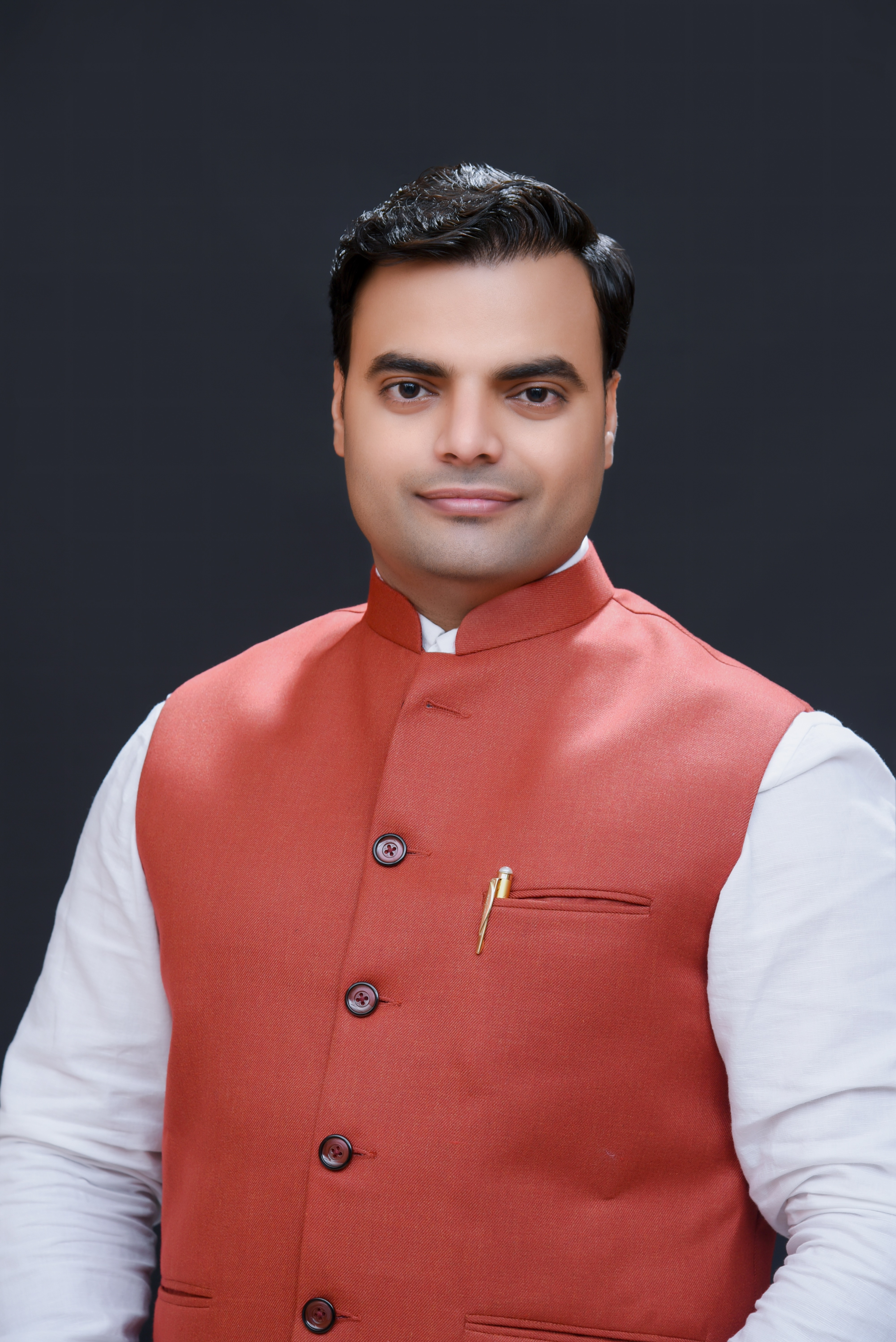

Member of Delhi Legislative Assembly
- Incumbent
- Assumed office 2025
- Preceded by: Gulab Singh Yadav
- Constituency: Matiala

Personal details
- Political party: Bharatiya Janata Party

Sandeep Sehrawat is an Indian politician from Bharatiya Janata Party from Delhi. He was elected as a Member of the Legislative Assembly in the 8th Delhi Assembly from Matiala Assembly constituency.
