= Rajokri =

Rajokri Harjokari
- Urbanized Village
- Location within Delhi Location within India
- Coordinates: 28.5031°N 77.11106°E
- Country: India
- State: Delhi
- District: New Delhi
- Founder: Rao Dal chand

Population (2001)
  - Total: 12,758++

Languages
  - Official: Hindi, English
- Time zone: UTC+5:30 (IST)
- Vehicle registration: DL9(vasant Vihar)
- Website: Na

Rajokri (formerly Harjokri) is a census town in New Delhi District (earlier in South West Delhi district) in the Indian union territory of Delhi. Rajokri village is near Gurgaon border on NH-8.This village is one of the oldest village in Delhi.

== Demographics ==
As of 2001 India census, Rajokri had a population of 12,758. Rajokri is a major Yadav village and forms part of the Ahirwal region. The village population primarily comprises Yadavs, largely of the Jhagdoliya gotra, along with a notable Jatav community that has long been settled in the upper Pahari area of the village. There are many temples, But the most famous temples are Kholi Baba Temple and Lord Shiva Temple/Mahadev Mandir. RIT(Rajokri Institute of Technology) is just opened in 2019, Air Force Station, Kendriya Vidyalaya, Govt girls and boys schools junior government schools and many schools are now opened in Rajokri.

It is the first village of New Delhi on NH-8 while coming from Gurgaon to Delhi. Acharya Narendra Dev College of Delhi University was opened in Rajokri, but could not function here due to some issues. Rajokri houses luxurious and the most expensive farm houses in Delhi. The farm house schemes includes The Green, Westend Greens, Grand Westend Greens etc.

There are 12 brethren village of Yadavs of which Rajokri is a part. These are Sarhol (Chief village of the Brethren), Rajokri, Kapashera, Dundahera, Molahera, Sikanderpur, Nathupur, Chakkarpur, Wazirabad, Kanhai, Samalka and Bijwasan.
