= Rajesh Gahlot =

Indian politician

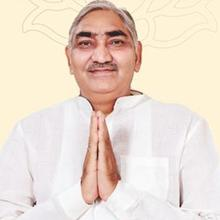
Rajesh Gahlot

Rajesh Gahlot (born 22 September 1964 – 14 August 2025) was an Indian politician and a leader of the Bharatiya Janata Party. He was elected to Delhi Legislative Assembly from Matiala constituency in Fifth Delhi Assembly.

== Electoral performance ==
Delhi Assembly elections, 2013: Matiala
| Party | Candidate | Votes | % | ±% |
|---|---|---|---|---|
| BJP | Rajesh Gahlot | 70,053 | 36.10 | +1.05 |
| AAP | Gulab Singh Yadav | 66,051 | 34.05 | |
| INC | Sumesh Shokeen | 48,358 | 24.93 | −15.21 |
| Independent | Satendra Singh Rana | 2,718 | 1.40 | |
| BSP | Sri Niwas Yadav | 2,411 | 1.24 | −13.65 |
| SP | Narender Yadav | 743 | 0.38 | −0.32 |
| NOTA | None | 636 | 0.33 | |
| Majority | | 4,002 | 2.06 | −3.02 |
| Turnout | | 1,94,228 | 64.13 | |
| BJP gain from INC | | Swing | +1.05 | |

Delhi Assembly elections, 2015: Matiala
| Party | Candidate | Votes | % | ±% |
|---|---|---|---|---|
| AAP | Gulab Singh Yadav | 1,27,665 | 54.93 | +20.88 |
| BJP | Rajesh Gahlot | 80,661 | 34.71 | −1.40 |
| INC | Sumesh Shokeen | 20,284 | 8.72 | −16.21 |
| BSP | Sanjay Kumar | 723 | 0.31 | −0.93 |
| NOTA | None of the above | 1,102 | 0.47 | +0.14 |
| Majority | | 47,004 | 20.22 | +18.16 |
| Turnout | | 2,32,829 | 67.02 | |
| AAP gain from BJP | | Swing | +20.18 | |

Delhi Assembly elections, 2020: Matiala
| Party | Candidate | Votes | % | ±% |
|---|---|---|---|---|
| AAP | Gulab Singh Yadav | 139,010 | 53.20 | −1.73 |
| BJP | Rajesh Gahlot | 1,10,935 | 42.45 | +7.74 |
| INC | Sumesh Shokeen | 7,317 | 2.81 | −5.91 |
| BSP | Sher Singh | 774 | 0.30 | −0.01 |
| None of the Above | None of the above | 1,602 | 0.61 | +0.14 |
| Majority | | 28,075 | 10.75 | −9.47 |
| Turnout | | 2,61,598 | 61.56 | −5.46 |
| AAP hold | | Swing | | |
