= Dabra, Rajasthan =

Coordinates: 24.0692°N 74.8770°E

Dabra
- village
- Interactive map of Dabra
- Country: India
- State: Rajasthan
- District: Didwana Kuchaman
- Tehsil: Didwana

Government
  - Body: Gram panchayat

Languages
  - Official: Hindi
- Time zone: UTC+5:30 (IST)
- ISO 3166 code: RJ-IN
- Vehicle registration: RJ-

Dabda or Dabra is a village in Didwana tehsil of Didwana Kuchaman district in Rajasthan.
