= Vinay Mishra =

Indian businesseman and politician

Delhi Legislative Assembly
- In office 11 February 2020 – 2025
- Preceded by: Adarsh Shastri
- Succeeded by: Parduymn Rajput
- Constituency: Dwarka

Personal details
- Party: Aam Aadmi Party
- Education: Indian Institute of Planning and Management, Delhi

Vinay Mishra is an Indian politician from Delhi belonging to Aam Aadmi Party (AAP). He is a former member of the Delhi Legislative Assembly.

He completed his MBA from the Indian Institute of Planning and Management, Delhi in 2006. He was elected to the Delhi Legislative Assembly from Dwarka on 11 February 2020.

Mishra also worked as in-charge of AAP’s Rajasthan unit.

In the 2025 Delhi Assembly elections, he was runner up to Parduymn Rajput of the BJP in Dwarka constituency.

On 14 May 2026, the Delhi High Court Judge Swarana Kanta Sharma initiated criminal contempt proceedings against 06 AAP leaders, Arvind Kejriwal, Manish Sisodia, Sanjay Singh, Vinay Mishra, Durgesh Pathak and Saurabh Bharadwaj. She said that they had posted defamatory, contemptuous and vilifying things against her, calling it contemptuous of Court. On 19 May, the Delhi High Court issued notice to these leaders in the given criminal contempt proceedings.

== Member of Legislative Assembly (2020 - 2025) ==
From 2020-2025, he was an elected member of the 7th Delhi Assembly.

Committee assignments of Delhi Legislative Assembly

- Member (2022-2023), Public Accounts Committee

== Electoral performance ==
=== 2025 ===
Delhi Assembly elections, 2025: Dwarka
Party	Candidate	Votes	%	±%
BJP	Parduymn Rajput	69,137	49.56	▲7.86
AAP	Vinay Mishra	61,308	43.95	▼8.35
INC	Adarsh Shastri	6,773	4.86	▼0.15
NOTA	None of the above	729	0.30	
Majority		7,829	5.61	
Turnout		1,38,775	62.2	
BJP gain from AAP		Swing		

Delhi Assembly elections, 2020: Dwarka
Party	Candidate	Votes	%	±%
AAP	Vinay Mishra	71,003	52.3	−6.77
BJP	Parduymn Rajput	56,616	41.7	+11.8
INC	Adarsh Shastri	6,757	5.0	−4.28
NOTA	None of the above	578	0.3	0.06
Majority		14,387	10.6	
Turnout		1,35,760	64.1	
AAP hold		Swing		

State Legislative Assembly
Preceded by ?	Member of the Delhi Legislative Assembly from Dwarka Assembly constituency 2020– 2025	Succeeded by Pradyumn Rajput
