= Dabri, Pakistan =

Dabari
- Location within Pakistan
- Coordinates: 32.06°N 74.41°E
- Country: Pakistan
- Province: Punjab
- Elevation: 384 m (1,260 ft)
- Time zone: UTC+05:00 (PST)

Dabari is a village in the Gujranwala District off the Punjab province of Pakistan.

== History ==
A pedestrian subway constructed to facilitate entry and exit to the Dabri Mor metro station was opened today (Tuesday) in the presence of DMRC’s managing director Mangu Singh and other senior officials,” a statement released by the Delhi Metro read.

Senior Metro officials said that the 185-metre-long underground facility will help metro users around Sitapuri, Dashrathpuri, Dabri Mor, Janakpuri C-2 block and Sagarpur, to easily reach the Dabri Mor station on the Magenta Line. Since the subway does not directly connect the Metro station, regular pedestrians who do not use the Metro services will also benefit.

The official said under phase-III, such pedestrian friendly facilities have been planned to increase the footfall and provide easy access to metro stations
