= West Delhi Lok Sabha constituency =

Constituency of the Indian parliament in Delhi

Coordinates: 28.6660°N 77.0670°E

West Delhi DL-6
- Lok Sabha constituency
- Interactive Map Outlining West Delhi Lok Sabha constituency

Constituency details
- Country: India
- Region: North India
- Union Territory: Delhi
- Assembly constituencies: Madipur; Rajouri Garden; Hari Nagar; Tilak Nagar; Janakpuri; Vikaspuri; Uttam Nagar; Dwarka; Matiala; Najafgarh
- Established: 2008
- Reservation: None

Member of Parliament
- 18th Lok Sabha
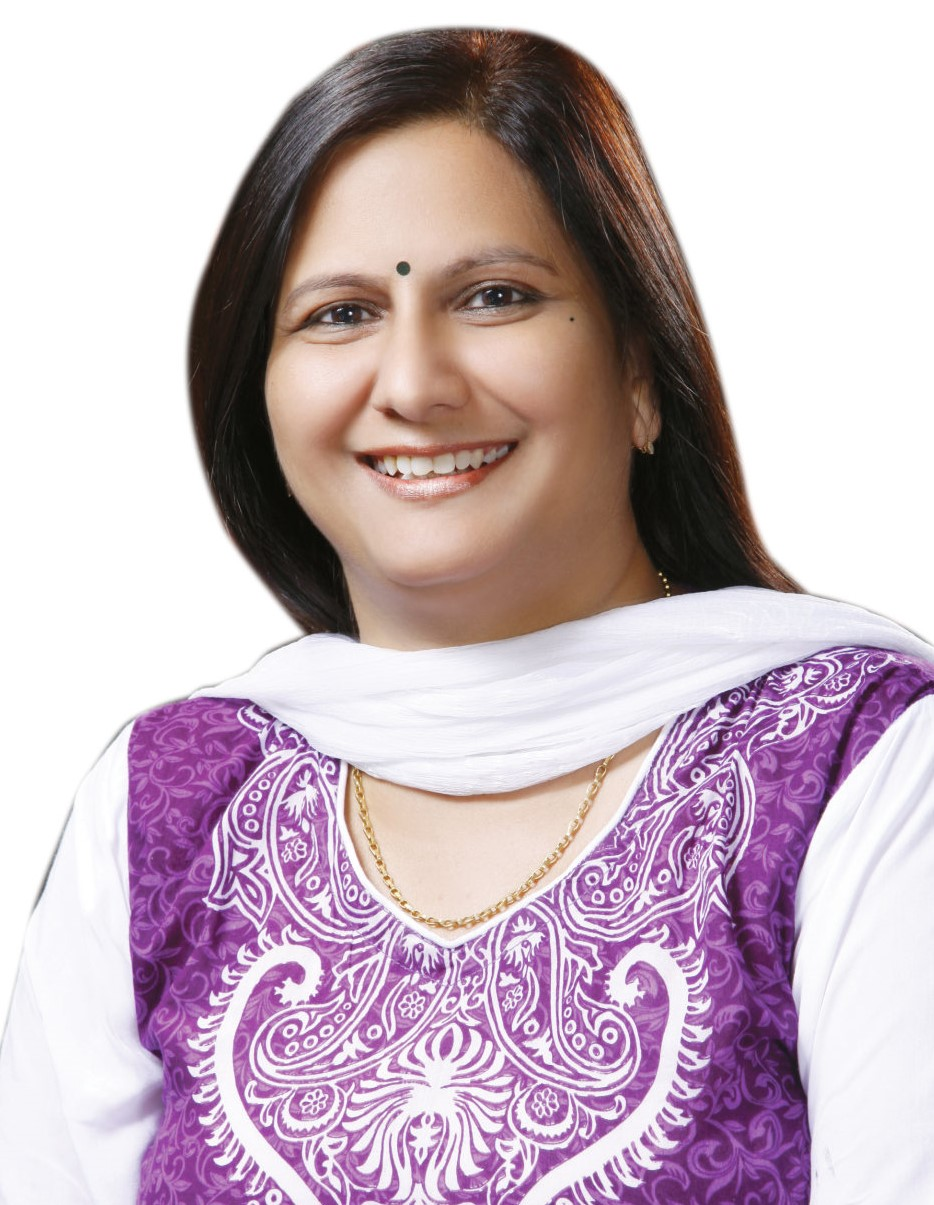
- Incumbent Kamaljeet Sehrawat
- Party: BJP
- Alliance: NDA
- Elected year: 2024

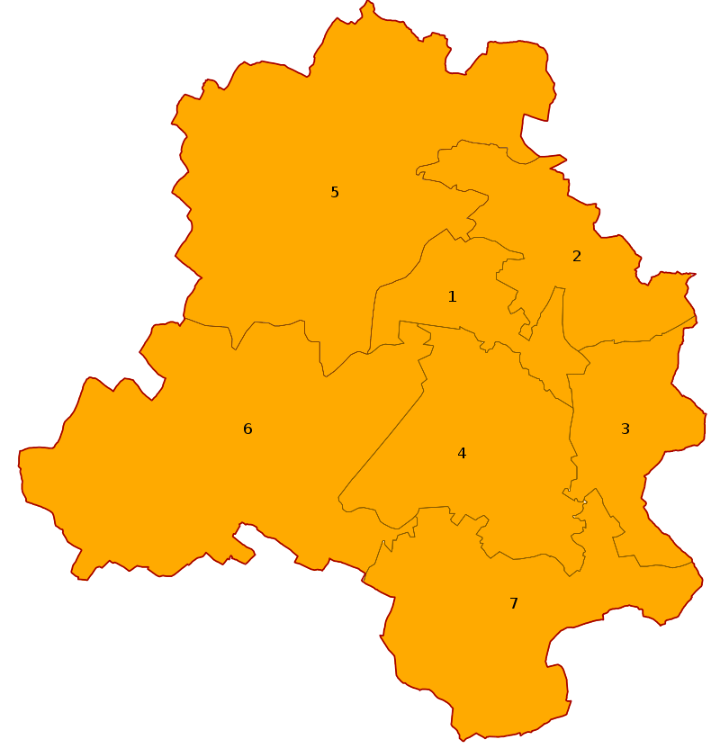
Political Map of Delhi showing Parliamentary constituencies as of 2024 elections.

West Delhi Lok Sabha constituency is one of the seven Lok Sabha (parliamentary) constituencies in the National Capital Territory of Delhi. This constituency came into existence in 2008 as a part of the implementation of the recommendations of the Delimitation Commission of India constituted in 2002. Earlier some parts of the constituency were included in Outer Delhi constituency and some parts were included in the erstwhile South Delhi constituency.

== Assembly segments ==
West Delhi Lok Sabha constituency presently comprises the following ten Vidhan Sabha (legislative assembly) constituencies:

#	Name	District	Member	Party (in 2025)	Leading (in 2024)
26	Madipur (SC)	West Delhi	Kailash Gangwal	BJP	BJP
27	Rajouri Garden	West Delhi	Manjinder Singh Sirsa	BJP	AAP
28	Hari Nagar	West Delhi	Shyam Sharma	BJP	BJP
29	Tilak Nagar	West Delhi	Jarnail Singh	AAP	AAP
30	Janakpuri	West Delhi	Ashish Sood	BJP	BJP
31	Vikaspuri	South West Delhi	Pankaj Kumar Singh	BJP	BJP
32	Uttam Nagar	South West Delhi	Pawan Sharma	BJP	BJP
33	Dwarka	South West Delhi	Parduymn Rajput	BJP	BJP
34	Matiala	South West Delhi	Sandeep Sehrawat	BJP	BJP
35	Najafgarh	South West Delhi	Neelam Pahalwan	BJP	BJP

== Members of Parliament ==
The West Delhi Lok Sabha constituency was created in 2009. The list of Member of Parliament (MP) is as follows:

Year	Member	Party
Till 2009 : Constituency did not exist
2009	Mahabal Mishra	Indian National Congress
2014	Parvesh Verma	Bharatiya Janata Party
2019	Parvesh Verma	Bharatiya Janata Party
2024	Kamaljeet Sehrawat	Bharatiya Janata Party

== Election results ==
=== 2024 ===
2024 Indian general election: West Delhi
Party	Candidate	Votes	%	±%
BJP	Kamaljeet Sehrawat	842,658	55.27	▼4.78
AAP	Mahabal Mishra	6,43,645	42.22	▲24.75
NOTA	None of the above	8,699	0.57	▼0.05
Majority		1,99,013	13.05	▼27.08
Turnout		15,24,751	58.81	▼2.01
BJP hold		Swing		

=== 2019 ===
2019 Indian general elections: West Delhi
Party	Candidate	Votes	%	±%
BJP	Parvesh Sahib Singh Verma	865,648	60.05	▲11.75
INC	Mahabal Mishra	2,87,162	19.92	▲5.59
AAP	Balbir Jakhar	2,51,873	17.47	▼10.91
BSP	Sita Saran Sen	13,269	0.92	▲0.49
NOTA	None of the Above	8,937	0.62	▲0.03
Majority		5,78,486	40.13	▲20.21
Turnout		14,42,492	60.82	▼5.28
BJP hold		Swing	▲11.75	

=== 2014 ===
2014 Indian general elections: West Delhi
Party	Candidate	Votes	%	±%
BJP	Parvesh Sahib Singh Verma	651,395	48.30	▲8.58
AAP	Jarnail Singh	3,82,809	28.38	New
INC	Mahabal Mishra	1,93,266	14.33	▼39.99
IND.	Jarnail Singh	84,722	6.28	N/A
BSP	Raj Pal Singh	8,707	0.65	▼3.44
NOTA	None of the Above	7,932	0.59	N/A
Margin of victory		2,68,586	19.92	▲5.32
Turnout		13,47,971	66.10	▲13.76
BJP gain from INC		Swing	▼6.02	

=== 2009 ===
2009 Indian general elections: West Delhi
Party	Candidate	Votes	%	±%
INC	Mahabal Mishra	479,899	54.32	
BJP	Prof. Jagdish Mukhi	3,50,889	39.72	
BSP	Deepak Bharadwaj	36,089	4.09	
BSKP	Krishan Kumar Sharma	3,309	0.37	
IND.	Har Gobind Arora	2,803	0.32	
Margin of victory		1,29,010	14.60	
Turnout		8,83,437	52.34	
INC win (new seat)				

== See also ==
- List of constituencies of the Lok Sabha
- Karol Bagh (Lok Sabha constituency)
