= Dabri, Jodhpur =

Village in Rajasthan, India

Dabri
- Village
- Gram panchayat Dabri
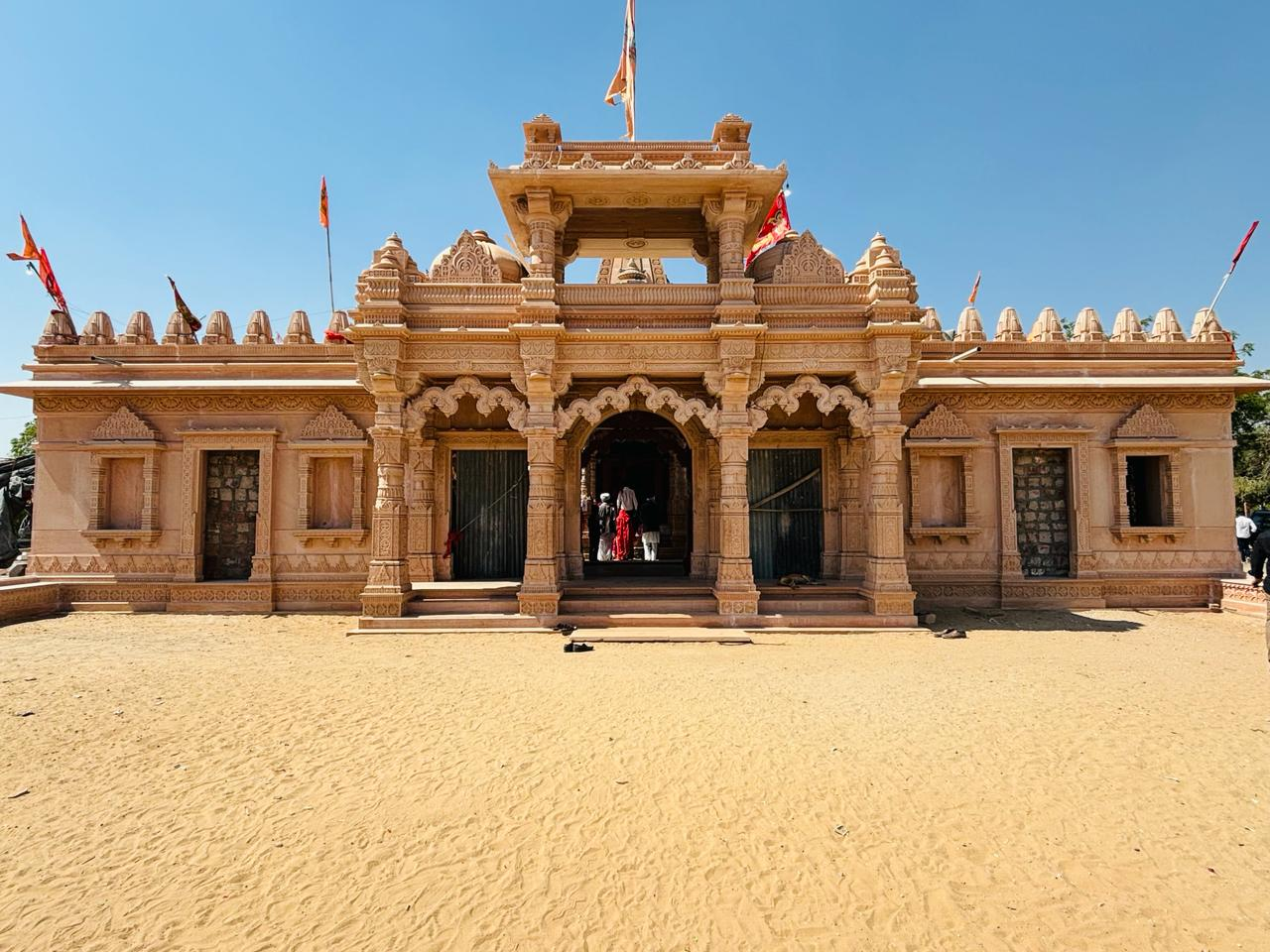
- Shri Hanuman Temple, Dabri
- Interactive map of Dabri
- Coordinates: 26.761712°N 72.750701°E
- Country: india
- State: Rajasthan
- District: Hanumangarh
- Tehsil: Rajasthan
- Gram panchayat: Gram panchayat Dabri

Government
  - Body: panchayat

Area
  - Total: 2,470 ha (6,100 acres)

Population (2011)
  - Total: 3,656
- Pin code: 335503
- Vehicle registration: RJ 49
- Vidhan Sabha Constituency: bhadra Assembly constituency
- Lok Sabha constituency: churu Lok Sabha constituency
- Climate: Dry (Köppen: BSh)
- Temperature: Summer: 50°C (122°F); Winter: 0°C (32°F)

Dabri is a village located in Bhadra Tehsil of Hanumangarh Rural district, Rajasthan, India. The village is situated 160 km north east of the town of Hanumangarh and 28 km East of the town of [Dabri, Bhadra Hanumangarh]].

== Etymology ==
The name Dabri is from Hindi डाबड़ी 'Dabri – long-spun land; field at wide intervals'

== Geography ==
Dabri is located in the Thar Desert at an elevation of 260 metres (853 ft) above sea level. The village is situated 80 km north east of the town of Jodhpur and 20 km west of the town of Osian.
