= Raj Kumari Dhillon =

Indian politician

Member of the Delhi Legislative Assembly
- In office 2020–2025
- Constituency: Hari Nagar

Personal details
- Born: 1962 or 1963 (age 63–64)
- Party: Aam Aadmi Party

Raj Kumari Dhillon is an Indian politician from the Aam Aadmi Party. She was elected as an MLA from Hari Nagar constituency in 2020 at 7th Delhi Legislative Assembly elections defeating BJP candidate Tajinder Bagga. Prior to this, she was a ward councillor from Congress Party.

She was denied Aam Aadmi Party ticket in 2025 Elections and she contested as independent candidate and lost.

== Electoral performance ==
=== 2025 ===
Delhi Assembly elections, 2025: Hari Nagar
Party	Candidate	Votes	%	±%
BJP	Shyam Sharma	50,179	48.7	▲13.63
AAP	Surinder Kumar Setia	43,547	42.3	▼11.37
INC	Prem Sharma	4,252	4.1	▼5.5
Independent	Raj Kumari Dhillon	3,398	3.3	
NOTA	None of the above	713	0.4	
Majority		6,632	6.5	▼12.17
Turnout		1,02,327	60.9	▼0.96
BJP hold		Swing	BJP	

Delhi Assembly elections, 2020: Hari Nagar
Party	Candidate	Votes	%	±%
AAP	Raj Kumari Dhillon	58,087	53.67	−4.75
BJP	Tajinder Bagga	37,956	35.07	
INC	Surinder Kumar Setia	10,394	9.60	+4.08
NOTA	None of the above	592	0.55	+0.03
Majority		20,131	18.67	
Turnout		1,08,375	61.86	−6.44
AAP hold		Swing	-4.75	
