= Vinod Kumar Sharma =

Vinod Kumar Sharma (also known as Vinod Sharma) is an Indian professor who is the first professor of disaster management in India and got Subhash Chandra Bose Aapda Prabandhan Puraskar in 2022. He is known for efforts for bringing disaster risk reduction in India.

== Career ==
He is the founder coordinator of National Center for Disaster Management. Currently he is serving as Senior Professor at Indian Institute of Public Administration. He also served as associate professor at University of Benghazi, University of Sulaymaniyah and Salahaddin University-Erbil, Consultant at University of Delaware and visiting professor at Kyoto University. He is resource person at Lal Bahadur Shastri National Academy of Administration.
