= Dabri Mor - Janakpuri South metro station =

Metro station in Delhi, India

Dabri Mor - Janakpuri South

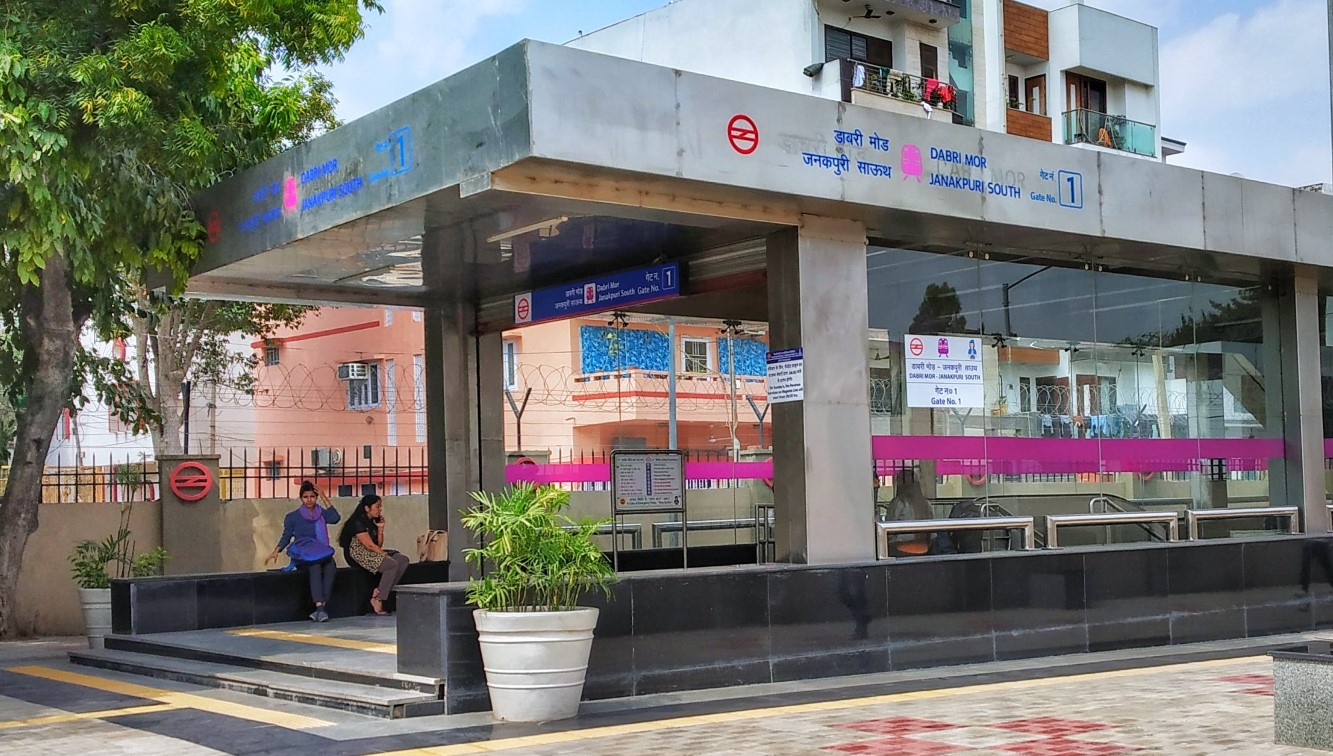

General information
- Location: Block C 2D, Dabri Mor, Janakpuri, Delhi, 110058
- Coordinates: 28°36′57″N 77°05′07″E
- System: Delhi Metro station
- Owner: Delhi Metro
- Operator: Delhi Metro Rail Corporation (DMRC)
- Line: Magenta Line
- Platforms: Island Platform; Platform-1 → Botanical Garden; Platform-2 → Inderlok
- Tracks: 2

Construction
- Structure type: Underground, Double-track
- Platform levels: 2
- Accessible: Yes

Other information
- Status: Staffed, Operational
- Station code: DBMR

History
- Opened: 29 May 2018; 8 years ago
- Electrified: 25 kV 50 Hz AC through overhead catenary

Services
Preceding station	Delhi Metro	Following station
Janakpuri West towards Inderlok	Magenta Line	Dashrathpuri towards Botanical Garden
Route map
Location

The Dabri Mor - Janakpuri South metro station is a station on the Magenta Line of the Delhi Metro. This represents part of the third phase of development of the Delhi Metro. It was opened to the public on 29 May 2018.

== Station layout ==
G	Street level	Exit/Entrance
C	Concourse	Fare control, station agent, Ticket/token, shops
P	Platform 1 Eastbound	Towards → Botanical Garden; Next Station: Dashrathpuri
P	Island platform | Doors will open on the right
P	Platform 2 Westbound	Towards ← Inderlok Change at the next station for Blue Line

== Entry/exit ==
Dabri Mor - Janakpuri South metro station Entry/exits
Gate No-1	Gate No-2	Gate No-3
Pankha Road	Janakpuri C-2	Shri Dada Dev Matri Avum Shishu Chikitsalaya
Arya Hospital	Kendriya Vidyalaya C-2	Dabri Village
Dabri Police Station	BSES Office	Sitapuri Dabri
Mata Chanan Devi Hospital	Sumermal Jain Public School	Syndicate Enclave, Raghu Nagar Dabri
Janakpuri C-1, C-3, C-4	District Park	Dabri Police Station

== Connections ==
=== Bus ===
Delhi Transport Corporation bus routes number 0OMS (-), 0740, 740, 740EXT, 741, 753, 761, 813, 833A, 879, 893, OMS (-), Uttam Nagar Terminal – Gurugram Bus Stand, serves the station from nearby C-2D Janakpuri bus stop.

=== Delhi Metro ===
Dabri Mor - Janakpuri South metro station has been constructed near C2D Janakpuri block near Dabri Mor. It was opened for public on 29 May 2018. It is electrified with 25 KW 50 Hz AC through overhead catenary. Its services are from preceding station Delhi Metro Following station Janakpuri West Terminus Magenta Line Dashrath Puri toward Botanical Garden. On all stations lying in Magenta Line, there are platform doors, that open only when the doors of incoming metro trains are aligned with it when metro comes to halt, enhancing the safety against falling between the gaps.

== See also ==
- Delhi
- Janakpuri
- Dashrath puri
- List of Delhi Metro stations
- Transport in Delhi
- Delhi Metro Rail Corporation
- Delhi Suburban Railway
- Delhi Monorail
- Indira Gandhi International Airport
- Delhi Transport Corporation
- South West Delhi
- National Capital Region (India)
- List of rapid transit systems
- List of metro systems
