= Vikaspuri =

- Neighborhood of Delhi
- Location in India
- Coordinates: 28°38′0″N 77°4′30″E
- Country: India
- State: National Capital Territory of Delhi
- District: West Delhi

Government
  - Body: Municipal Corporation of Delhi

Languages
- Time zone: UTC+5:30 (IST)
- PIN: 110018
- Telephone code: 011
- Lok Sabha constituency: Outer Delhi
- Civic agency: MCD

Vikaspuri is a posh residential area in West Delhi, India. It is home to a few notable figures.

== Notable people ==
- Virat Kohli, Former Captain of Indian Cricket Team
- Daler Mehndi, singer
- Shikhar Dhawan, cricketer
- Millind Gaba, singer
- Aastha Gill, singer

== See also ==
- South West Delhi
- West Delhi
