= Parduymn Rajput =

Indian politician

Member of Delhi Legislative Assembly
- Incumbent
- Assumed office 8 February 2025
- Preceded by: Vinay Mishra
- Succeeded by: Vinay Mishra
- Constituency: Dwarka
- In office 2009 - 2015

Personal details
- Party: Bharatiya Janata Party

Parduymn Rajput (born 12 July 1963) is an Indian Politician and a leader of Bharatiya Janata Party. In Fifth Delhi Assembly, he served as a member of the Delhi Legislative Assembly from Dwarka constituency. He won the 2025 Delhi Legislative Assembly election as a BJP candidate from Dwarka constituency.
