= List of constituencies of the Delhi Legislative Assembly =

Delhi Legislative Assembly
- 8th Delhi Assembly

Type
- Type: Unicameral
- Term limits: 5 years

History
- Founded: 1952–1956; 1993
- Preceded by: Delhi Metropolitan Council
- Seats: 70

Elections
- Voting system: First past the post
- Last election: February 2025

Meeting place
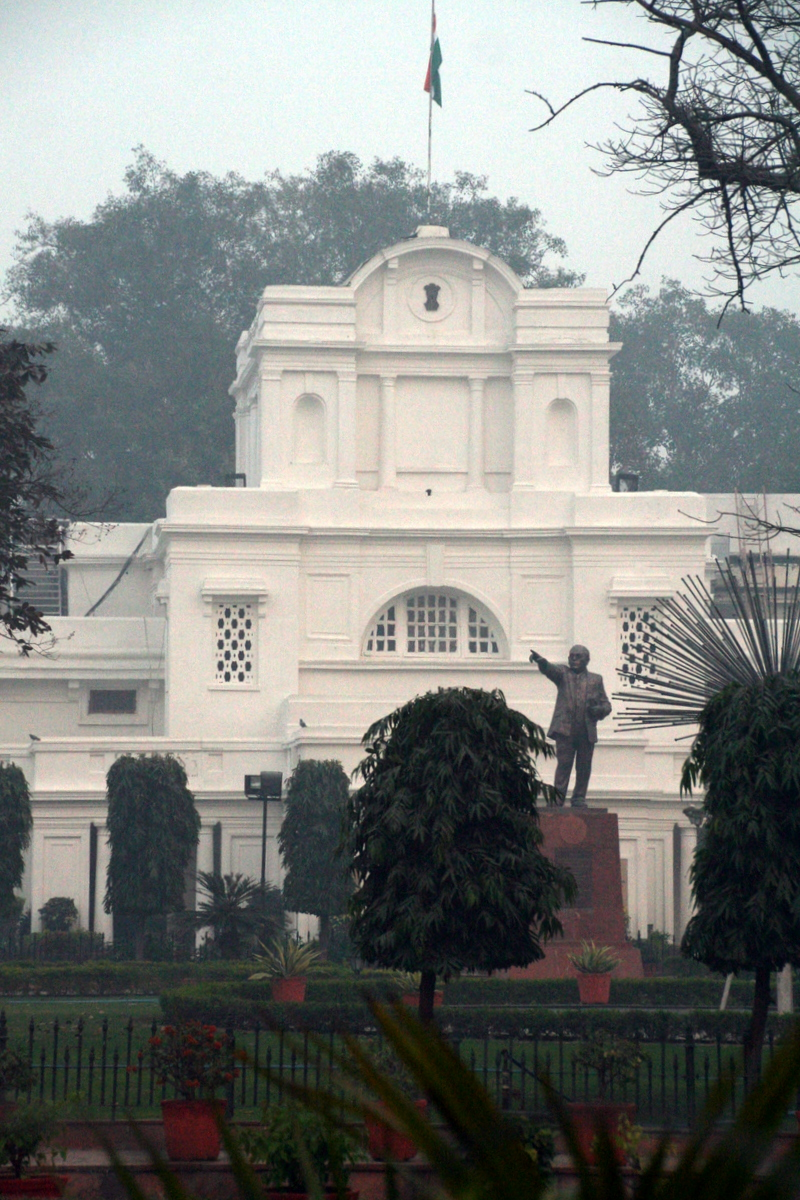
- Old Secretariat, Delhi

Website
- Legislative Assembly of Delhi

Following is the list of the constituencies of the Delhi Legislative Assembly since the delimitation of legislative assembly constituencies in 2008. At present, 12 constituencies are reserved for the candidates belonging to the Scheduled castes.

== Constituencies ==
The constituencies of Delhi with their reservation status indicated by colour

Reservation
Scheduled Castes (SC)

Constituencies of the Delhi Legislative Assembly
No.	Name	Reservation	District	Lok Sabha constituency	Electorate (2020)
1	Narela	None	North Delhi	North West Delhi	253,982
2	Burari	None	North Delhi	North East Delhi	361,703
3	Timarpur	None	North Delhi	North East Delhi	203,599
4	Adarsh Nagar	None	North Delhi	Chandni Chowk	173,416
5	Badli	None	North Delhi	North West Delhi	219,941
6	Rithala	None	North West Delhi	North West Delhi	279,653
7	Bawana	SC	North Delhi	North West Delhi	319,559
8	Mundka	None	North West Delhi	North West Delhi	282,984
9	Kirari	None	North West Delhi	North West Delhi	273,856
10	Sultan Pur Majra	SC	North West Delhi	North West Delhi	175,622
11	Nangloi Jat	None	West Delhi	North West Delhi	266,339
12	Mangol Puri (SC)	None	North West Delhi	North West Delhi	190,728
13	Rohini	None	North Delhi	North West Delhi	183,092
14	Shalimar Bagh	None	North West Delhi	Chandni Chowk	189,373
15	Shakur Basti	None	North Delhi	Chandni Chowk	146,226
16	Tri Nagar	None	North West Delhi	Chandni Chowk	167,978
17	Wazirpur	None	North Delhi	Chandni Chowk	181,241
18	Model Town	None	North Delhi	Chandni Chowk	168,355
19	Sadar Bazar	None	Central Delhi	Chandni Chowk	184,903
20	Chandni Chowk	None	Central Delhi	Chandni Chowk	125,717
21	Matia Mahal	None	Central Delhi	Chandni Chowk	125,793
22	Ballimaran	None	Central Delhi	Chandni Chowk	141,744
23	Karol Bagh	SC	Central Delhi	New Delhi	177,413
24	Patel Nagar (SC)	None	West Delhi	New Delhi	198,185
25	Moti Nagar	None	West Delhi	New Delhi	181,883
26	Madipur	SC	West Delhi	West Delhi	175,048
27	Rajouri Garden	None	West Delhi	West Delhi	180,248
28	Hari Nagar	None	West Delhi	West Delhi	175,191
29	Tilak Nagar	None	West Delhi	West Delhi	156,949
30	Janakpuri	None	West Delhi	West Delhi	189,818
31	Vikaspuri	None	West Delhi	West Delhi	402,599
32	Uttam Nagar	None	West Delhi	West Delhi	284,770
33	Dwarka	None	West Delhi	West Delhi	220,001
34	Matiala	None	West Delhi	West Delhi	424,924
35	Najafgarh	None	West Delhi	West Delhi	251,833
36	Bijwasan	None	West Delhi	South Delhi	201,630
37	Palam	None	West Delhi	South Delhi	247,721
38	Delhi Cantonment	None	New Delhi	New Delhi	129,703
39	Rajinder Nagar	None	New Delhi	New Delhi	177,222
40	New Delhi	None	New Delhi	New Delhi	146,122
41	Jangpura	None	South East Delhi	East Delhi	146,383
42	Kasturba Nagar	None	South East Delhi	New Delhi	153,485
43	Malviya Nagar	None	South Delhi	New Delhi	152,442
44	R K Puram	None	New Delhi	New Delhi	157,876
45	Mehrauli	None	South Delhi	South Delhi	203,804
46	Chhatarpur	None	South Delhi	South Delhi	218,736
47	Deoli	SC	South Delhi	South Delhi	236,728
48	Ambedkar Nagar	SC	South Delhi	South Delhi	157,223
49	Sangam Vihar	None	South East Delhi	South Delhi	189,041
50	Greater Kailash	None	South East Delhi	New Delhi	180,653
51	Kalkaji	None	South East Delhi	South Delhi	185,910
52	Tughlakabad	None	South East Delhi	South Delhi	177,672
53	Badarpur	None	South East Delhi	South Delhi	321,556
54	Okhla	None	South East Delhi	South East Delhi	335,147
55	Trilokpuri	SC	East Delhi	East Delhi	200,540
56	Kondli	SC	East Delhi	East Delhi	191,383
57	Patparganj	None	East Delhi	East Delhi	231,461
58	Laxmi Nagar	None	East Delhi	East Delhi	221,792
59	Vishwas Nagar	None	Shahdara	East Delhi	200,047
60	Krishna Nagar	None	East Delhi	East Delhi	217,431
61	Gandhi Nagar	None	East Delhi	East Delhi	182,831
62	Shahdara	None	Shahdara	East Delhi	189,407
63	Seemapuri	SC	Shahdara	East Delhi	196,306
64	Rohtas Nagar	None	Shahdara	East Delhi	210,943
65	Seelampur	None	North East Delhi	North East Delhi	181,756
66	Ghonda	None	North East Delhi	North East Delhi	222,398
67	Babarpur	None	Shahdara	North East Delhi	217,243
68	Gokalpur	SC	North East Delhi	North East Delhi	234,779
69	Mustafabad	None	North East Delhi	North East Delhi	262,750
70	Karawal Nagar	None	North East Delhi	North East Delhi	283,203
