= List of leaders of the opposition in the Delhi Legislative Assembly =

Leader of the Official Opposition of the National Capital Territory of Delhi

Leader of the Opposition of Delhi Legislative Assembly
- Seal of the Government of Delhi

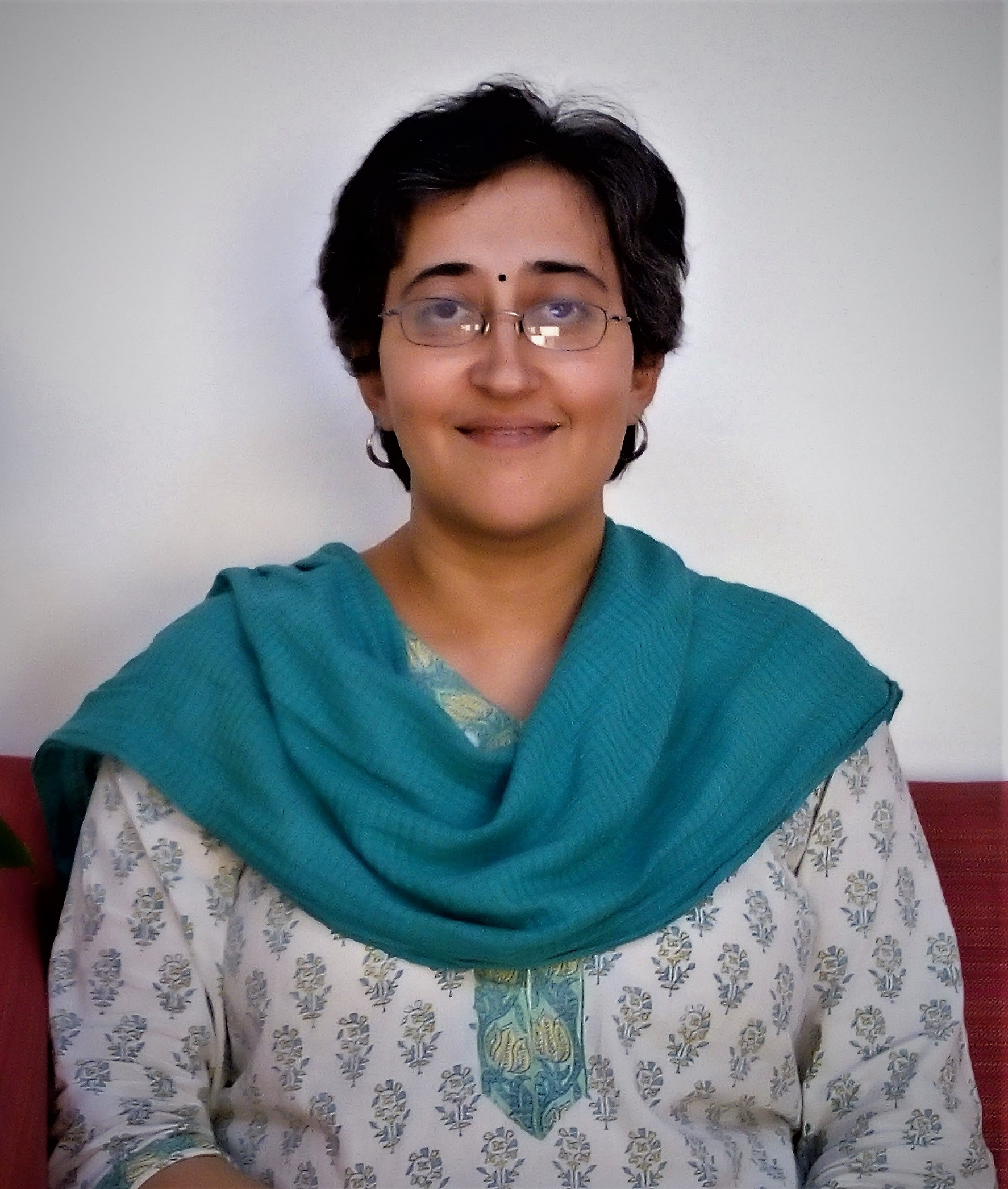
- Incumbent; Atishi Marlena since 23 February 2025
- Style: The Honourable
- Type: Leader of the Opposition
- Member of: Delhi Legislative Assembly
- Residence: B-63, Kalkaji, South Delhi
- Seat: Old Secretariat, New Delhi
- Nominator: Members of the Official Opposition of the Legislative Assembly
- Appointer: Speaker of the Assembly
- Term length: 5 years Till the Assembly continues
- Inaugural holder: Deep Chand Bandhu (1993-1998)
- Deputy: Deputy Leader of Opposition

The leader of the opposition in the Delhi Legislative Assembly is the politician who leads the official opposition in the Delhi Legislative Assembly. The current leader of the opposition is former Chief Minister Atishi Marlena, the first female in Delhi assembly to hold this office.

== Eligibility ==
Official Opposition is a term used in Delhi Legislative Assembly to designate the political party which has secured the second largest number of seats in the assembly. In order to get formal recognition, the party must have at least 10% of total membership of the Legislative Assembly. A single party has to meet the 10% seat criterion, not an alliance. Many of the Indian state legislatures also follow this 10% rule while the rest of them prefer single largest opposition party according to the rules of their respective houses.

== Role ==
The opposition's main role is to question the government of the day and hold them accountable to the public. The opposition is equally responsible in upholding the best interests of the people of the country. They have to ensure that the Government does not take any steps, which might have negative effects on the people of the country.

The role of the opposition in legislature is basically to check the excesses of the ruling or dominant party, and not to be totally antagonistic. There are actions of the ruling party which may be beneficial to the masses and opposition is expected to support such steps.

In legislature, opposition party has a major role and must act to discourage the party in power from acting against the interests of the country and the common man. They are expected to alert the population and the Government on the content of any bill, which is not in the best interests of the country.

== List of leaders of the opposition of Delhi ==
| # | Portrait | Name | Constituency | Term | | | Assembly (Election) | Party |
|---|---|---|---|---|---|---|---|---|
Vacant (no opposition with at least 10% seats)
State Reorganization
| 1 | | Deep Chand Bandhu | Wazirpur | 1993 | 1998 | 5 years | 1st (1993 election) | Indian National Congress |
| 2 | | Madan Lal Khurana | Moti Nagar | 1998 | 2003 | 5 years | 2nd (1998 election) | Bharatiya Janata Party |
| 3 | | Jagdish Mukhi | Janakpuri | 2003 | 2008 | 5 years | 3rd (2003 election) | Bharatiya Janata Party |
| 4 | | Vijay Kumar Malhotra | Greater Kailash | 2008 | 2013 | 5 years | 4th (2008 election) | Bharatiya Janata Party |
| 5 | | Harsh Vardhan | Krishna Nagar | 2 December 2013 | 16 May 2014 | 165 days | 5th (2013 election) | Bharatiya Janata Party |
| 6 | Vacant | VACANT | Vacant | 16 April 2015 | 11 February 2020 | 4 years, 276 days | 6th ( 2015 election ) | Bharatiya Janata Party |
| 7 | | Ramvir Singh Bidhuri | Badarpur | 24 February 2020 | 4 June 2024 | 4 years, 101 days | 7th (2020 election) | Bharatiya Janata Party |
| (6) | | Vijender Gupta | Rohini | 5 August 2024 | 8 February 2025 | 187 days | 7th (2020 election) | Bharatiya Janata Party |
| 8 | | Atishi Marlena Singh | Kalkaji | 23 February 2025 | Incumbent | 1 year, 196 days | 8th (2025 elections) | Aam Aadmi Party |

== Deputy leaders of opposition ==
| # | Portrait | Name | Constituency | Term | | | Assembly (Election) | Party |
|---|---|---|---|---|---|---|---|---|
Vacant (no opposition with at least 10% seats)
State Reorganization
| 1 | ? | ? | ? | 1993 | 1998 | 5 years | 1st (1993 election) | Indian National Congress |
| 2 | ? | ? | ? | 1998 | 2003 | 5 years | 2nd (1998 election) | Bharatiya Janata Party |
| 3 | ? | ? | ? | 2003 | 2008 | 5 years | 3rd (2003 election) | Bharatiya Janata Party |
| 4 | ? | ? | ? | 2008 | 2013 | 5 years | 4th (2008 election) | Bharatiya Janata Party |
| 5 | ? | ? | ? | 2 December 2013 | 16 May 2014 | 165 days | 5th (2013 election) | Bharatiya Janata Party |
| 6 | ? | ? | ? | 16 April 2015 | 11 February 2020 | 4 years, 276 days | 6th ( 2015 election ) | Bharatiya Janata Party |
| 7 | | Om Prakash Sharma | Vishwas Nagar | 24 February 2020 | 8 February 2025 | 4 years, 350 days | 7th (2020 election) | Bharatiya Janata Party |
| 9 | | Anil Jha Vats | Kirari | 23 February 2025 | Incumbent | 4 months | 8th (2025 election) | Aam Aadmi Party |

== See also ==
- Government of Delhi
- Lieutenant Governors of Delhi
- Chief Minister of Delhi
- Delhi Legislative Assembly
- Speaker of the Delhi Legislative Assembly
- Cabinet of Delhi
- Chief Justice of Delhi
- Leader of the Opposition in the Parliament of India
- List of current Indian opposition leaders
