= 8th Delhi Assembly =

Eighth Legislative Assembly of Delhi

8th Delhi Legislative Assembly
←	7th Delhi Assembly	9th Delhi Assembly	→

Overview
- Legislative body: Delhi Legislative Assembly
- Meeting place: Old Secretariat, Vikram Nagar, Civil Lines, Delhi
- Term: 20 February 2025 –
- Election: 2025 Delhi Legislative Assembly election
- Government: BJP
- Opposition: AAP
- Website: delhiassembly.delhi.gov.in
- Government (48) BJP (48) Opposition (22) AAP (22)
- Members: 70
- Speaker: Vijender Gupta
- Deputy Speaker: Mohan Singh Bisht
- Chief Minister: Rekha Gupta
- Deputy Chief Minister: Parvesh Verma
- Leader of the Opposition: Atishi Marlena
- Deputy Leader of the Opposition: Anil Jha Vats

The 8th Delhi Legislative Assembly was constituted on 20 February 2025 after the 2025 Delhi Legislative Assembly elections were concluded earlier on 5 February 2025 and the results were announced on 8 February 2025. It is the legislative arm of the Government of Delhi.

== History ==
=== Election and government formation ===
Elections for 70 assembly seats in Delhi were concluded on 5 February 2025 and results were announced on 8 February 2025. The Bharatiya Janata Party emerged as the single largest party by winning 48 out of 70 seats and formed a government in Delhi after 27 years.

== Office bearers ==
Office	Holder	Since
Speaker	Vijender Gupta	20 February 2025
Deputy Speaker	Mohan Singh Bisht	20 February 2025
Leader of the House (Chief Minister)	Rekha Gupta	20 February 2025
Leader of the Opposition	Atishi Marlena	25 February 2025

== Members of Legislative Assembly ==
District	No.	Constituency	Name	Party	Remarks
North Delhi	1	Narela	Raj Karan Khatri	Bharatiya Janata Party	
Central Delhi	2	Burari	Sanjeev Jha	Aam Aadmi Party	
Central Delhi	3	Timarpur	Surya Prakash Khatri	Bharatiya Janata Party	
North Delhi	4	Adarsh Nagar	Raj Kumar Bhatia	Bharatiya Janata Party	
North Delhi	5	Badli	Deepak Chaudhary	Bharatiya Janata Party	
North West Delhi	6	Rithala	Kulwant Rana	Bharatiya Janata Party	
North Delhi	7	Bawana (SC)	Ravinder Indraj Singh	Bharatiya Janata Party	Cabinet minister
North West Delhi	8	Mundka	Gajender Drall	Bharatiya Janata Party	
North West Delhi	9	Kirari	Anil Jha Vats	Aam Aadmi Party	
North West Delhi	10	Sultanpur Majra (SC)	Mukesh Kumar Ahlawat	Aam Aadmi Party	
West Delhi	11	Nangloi Jat	Manoj Kumar Shokeen	Bharatiya Janata Party	
North West Delhi	12	Mangol Puri (SC)	Raj Kumar Chauhan	Bharatiya Janata Party	
North Delhi	13	Rohini	Vijender Gupta	Bharatiya Janata Party	Speaker
North West Delhi	14	Shalimar Bagh	Rekha Gupta	Bharatiya Janata Party	Chief Minister
North Delhi	15	Shakur Basti	Karnail Singh	Bharatiya Janata Party	
North West Delhi	16	Tri Nagar	Tilak Ram Gupta	Bharatiya Janata Party	
North Delhi	17	Wazirpur	Poonam Sharma	Bharatiya Janata Party	
North Delhi	18	Model Town	Ashok Goel	Bharatiya Janata Party	
Central Delhi	19	Sadar Bazar	Som Dutt	Aam Aadmi Party	
Central Delhi	20	Chandni Chowk	Punardeep Sawhney	Aam Aadmi Party	
Central Delhi	21	Matia Mahal	Aaley Mohammad Iqbal	Aam Aadmi Party	
Central Delhi	22	Ballimaran	Imran Hussain	Aam Aadmi Party	
Central Delhi	23	Karol Bagh (SC)	Vishesh Ravi	Aam Aadmi Party	
New Delhi	24	Patel Nagar (SC)	Pravesh Ratn	Aam Aadmi Party	
West Delhi	25	Moti Nagar	Harish Khurana	Bharatiya Janata Party	
West Delhi	26	Madipur (SC)	Kailash Gangwal	Bharatiya Janata Party	
West Delhi	27	Rajouri Garden	Manjinder Singh Sirsa	Bharatiya Janata Party	Cabinet minister
West Delhi	28	Hari Nagar	Shyam Sharma	Bharatiya Janata Party	
West Delhi	29	Tilak Nagar	Jarnail Singh	Aam Aadmi Party	
West Delhi	30	Janakpuri	Ashish Sood	Bharatiya Janata Party	Cabinet minister
South West Delhi	31	Vikaspuri	Pankaj Kumar Singh	Bharatiya Janata Party	Cabinet minister
South West Delhi	32	Uttam Nagar	Pawan Sharma	Bharatiya Janata Party	
South West Delhi	33	Dwarka	Pradyuman Rajput	Bharatiya Janata Party	
South West Delhi	34	Matiala	Sandeep Sehrawat	Bharatiya Janata Party	
South West Delhi	35	Najafgarh	Neelam Pahalwan	Bharatiya Janata Party	
South West Delhi	36	Bijwasan	Kailash Gahlot	Bharatiya Janata Party	
South West Delhi	37	Palam	Kuldeep Solanki	Bharatiya Janata Party	
New Delhi	38	Delhi Cantonment	Virender Singh Kadian	Aam Aadmi Party	
New Delhi	39	Rajinder Nagar	Umang Bajaj	Bharatiya Janata Party	
New Delhi	40	New Delhi	Parvesh Sahib Singh Verma	Bharatiya Janata Party	Cabinet Minister
South East Delhi	41	Jangpura	Tarvinder Singh Marwah	Bharatiya Janata Party	
South East Delhi	42	Kasturba Nagar	Neeraj Basoya	Bharatiya Janata Party	
South Delhi	43	Malviya Nagar	Satish Upadhyay	Bharatiya Janata Party	
New Delhi	44	R. K. Puram	Anil Kumar Sharma	Bharatiya Janata Party	
South Delhi	45	Mehrauli	Gajender Yadav	Bharatiya Janata Party	
South Delhi	46	Chhatarpur	Kartar Singh Tanwar	Bharatiya Janata Party	
South Delhi	47	Deoli (SC)	Prem Chauhan	Aam Aadmi Party	
South Delhi	48	Ambedkar Nagar (SC)	Ajay Dutt	Aam Aadmi Party	
South East Delhi	49	Sangam Vihar	Chandan Kumar Choudhary	Bharatiya Janata Party	
New Delhi	50	Greater Kailash	Shikha Roy	Bharatiya Janata Party	
South East Delhi	51	Kalkaji	Atishi Marlena	Aam Aadmi Party	Leader of Opposition
South East Delhi	52	Tughlakabad	Sahi Ram	Aam Aadmi Party	
South East Delhi	53	Badarpur	Ram Singh Netaji	Aam Aadmi Party	
South East Delhi	54	Okhla	Amanatullah Khan	Aam Aadmi Party	
East Delhi	55	Trilokpuri (SC)	Ravikant Ujjain	Bharatiya Janata Party	
East Delhi	56	Kondli (SC)	Kuldeep Kumar	Aam Aadmi Party	
East Delhi	57	Patparganj	Ravinder Singh Negi	Bharatiya Janata Party	
East Delhi	58	Laxmi Nagar	Abhay Verma	Bharatiya Janata Party	
Shahdara	59	Vishwas Nagar	Om Prakash Sharma	Bharatiya Janata Party	
East Delhi	60	Krishna Nagar	Anil Goyal	Bharatiya Janata Party	
East Delhi	61	Gandhi Nagar	Arvinder Singh Lovely	Bharatiya Janata Party	Pro tem Speaker
Shahdara	62	Shahdara	Sanjay Goyal	Bharatiya Janata Party	
Shahdara	63	Seemapuri (SC)	Veer Singh Dhingan	Aam Aadmi Party	
Shahdara	64	Rohtas Nagar	Jitender Mahajan	Bharatiya Janata Party	
North East Delhi	65	Seelampur	Chaudhary Zubair Ahmad	Aam Aadmi Party	
North East Delhi	66	Ghonda	Ajay Mahawar	Bharatiya Janata Party	
Shahdara	67	Babarpur	Gopal Rai	Aam Aadmi Party	
North East Delhi	68	Gokalpur	Surendra Kumar	Aam Aadmi Party	
North East Delhi	69	Mustafabad	Mohan Singh Bisht	Bharatiya Janata Party	Deputy Speaker
North East Delhi	70	Karawal Nagar	Kapil Mishra	Bharatiya Janata Party	Cabinet Minister
