= Vishesh Ravi =

Indian politician

Member of the Delhi Legislative Assembly
- Incumbent
- Assumed office Feb 2020
- Preceded by: Surender Pal Ratawal
- Constituency: Karol Bagh
Titles
- Chairman: N.C. Joshi Hospital
- Chairman: Committee on Salary and Other Allowances of Members of Delhi Legislative Assembly
- Member: A & U Tibbia College and Hospital
- Member: Committee on Public Accounts, Delhi Legislative Assembly

Personal details
- Party: Aam Aadmi Party

Vishesh Ravi is an Indian politician and member of the Aam Aadmi Party. He was elected to the Delhi Legislative Assembly from Karol Bagh constituency in the December 2013 elections, when he defeated Surendra Pal of the Bharatiya Janata Party. He has been elected four times consecutively to the Delhi Legislative Assembly (years: 2013, 2015, 2020, 2025).

In 2015, he represented the Government of NCT of Delhi at a conference held in Moscow, at the BRICS Youth Forum.

In 2017, he attended the Indo-Pak Peace Conference held in Dubai. He is recognized for his dedication to public service and was awarded "Best MLA in Delhi Legislative Assembly" in 2017.

On 1 February 2017, Ravi got married in a mass community wedding at the Shri Guru Ravidas Vishram Dham Temple where 8 couples were married in one day.

He tested COVID-19 positive in 2020, during the first wave while serving the people of his constituency. After overcoming COVID-19 he also donated his COVID-19 Convalescent Plasma (CCP) to a 93 year old ex-air force marshal.

== Member of Legislative Assembly (2020 - present) ==
Since 2020, he is an elected member of the 7th Delhi Assembly and 8th Delhi Assembly.

Committee assignments of Delhi Legislative Assembly

- Member (2022-2023), Public Accounts Committee

== Electoral performance ==
Delhi Assembly elections, 2025: Karol Bagh
Party	Candidate	Votes	%	±%
AAP	Vishesh Ravi	52,297		
BJP	Dushyant Kumar Gautam	44867		
INC	Rahul Dhanak	4252		
BSP	Ranjeet Kumar Gangwal	626		
NOTA	None of the above	548		
Majority		7430		
Turnout				
		Swing		

Delhi Assembly elections, 2020: Karol Bagh
Party	Candidate	Votes	%	±%
AAP	Vishesh Ravi	67,494	62.23	+2.43
BJP	Yogender Chandoliya	35,734	32.95	+2.31
INC	Gourav Kumar	3,365	3.10	−5.01
BSP	Lekhraj Jatav	783	0.72	+0.22
NOTA	None of the above	447	0.41	+0.05
SS	Gaurav	192	0.18	
Majority		31,760	29.28	+0.12
Turnout		1,08,514	61.16	−7.28
AAP hold		Swing	+2.43	

State Legislative Assembly
Preceded by Surender Pal Ratawal	Member of the Delhi Legislative Assembly from Karol Bagh Assembly constituency 2013 - present	Incumbent
