= Sanjeev Jha =

Indian politician (born 1979)

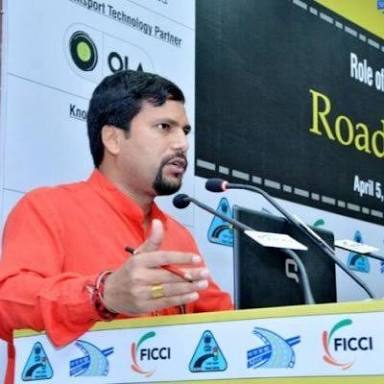

Member of Delhi Legislative Assembly
- Incumbent
- Assumed office 14 February 2015
- Preceded by: President's rule
- Constituency: Burari
- In office 28 December 2013 – 14 February 2014
- Preceded by: Krishan Tyagi
- Succeeded by: President's rule
- Constituency: Burari

Personal details
- Born: 1 August 1979 (age 47) Madhubani, Bihar, India
- Party: Aam Aadmi Party
- Spouse: Gulshan Jha
- Children: 1
- Source: [Onkar Roy Sanjeev Jha - Profile]

Sanjeev Jha is an Indian politician belonging to the Aam Aadmi Party. He is now a member of the Delhi Legislative Assembly (MLA) from Burari Constituency. Sanjeev is also the incharge of Chhattisgarh and Spokesperson of the Aam Aadmi Party.

== Early life and education ==
Sanjeev Jha was born on 1 August 1979 in Sundarpur Bhitthi, a village in the Madhubani district of Bihar. He was the fourth of the six children born to Late Sh. Sushil Jha and Gayatri Devi. Jha’s family belonged to Bihar. His father was an employee of Bharat Sanchar Nigam Limited (BSNL). Sanjeev did his schooling at M. Y. N. High School Shambhuar in Madhubani. He subsequently attended R. K. College in Madhubani District to study BA (Hons.) in 2001.

== Activism ==
In early 2007 he participated in various environmental movements with many social workers and along with that he started teaching poor children in East Delhi Slum area.

In 2010 he joined the anti-corruption movement launched by Anna Hazare and Arvind Kejriwal and formed IAC YUVA MANCH. The IAC demanded the enactment of the Jan Lokpal Bill, which would result in a strong ombudsman. He was at the forefronts when the city erupted in protests after the Nirbhaya gang rape.

== Political career ==
In early 2012 Sanjeev Jha played a key role in the formation of CHATRA YUVA SANGHARSH SAMITI (CYSS). Following the creation of the Aam Aadmi Party (AAP) in late 2012, Sanjeev Jha was elected as a Member of the Legislative Assembly in the December 2013 Delhi Assembly election, when he defeated Shri Krishan Tyagi, a Bharatiya Janata Party candidate, by 10,351 votes in the Burari constituency of North East Delhi. He had also served as Chairman of District Development Committee (Central District).

In the February 2015 Delhi Assembly election, which resulted in a landslide victory for AAP, he was again elected from Burari, defeating Gopal Jha of the Bharatiya Janata Party by over 67,950 votes (Second highest margin in Delhi). Later on, he was appointed Spokesperson & Prabhari of State Bihar and Jharkhand by Aam Aadmi Party. In 2016 Delhi Govt. appointed him Parliamentary Secretary of Transport. In 2018 he had also served as General Secretary of ruling party till Jan. 2020 in Legislative Assembly along with Chairman of District Development Committee (Central District), Public Account Committee, Standing Committee on Education by Delhi Legislative Assembly. He was subsequently appointed Member of State Transport Authority and nominated Member of North MCD.

In 2020 Delhi Legislative Assembly election, he again defeated Shailendra Kumar, a JDU candidate, by 88,158 votes. He was appointed Prabhari of State Chhattisgarh (2022).

In 2025 Delhi Legislative Assembly election, he again defeated JDU candidate Shailendra Kumar by a reduced margin of 20,601 votes.

== Rioting and conviction ==
Jha, along with another Aam Aadmi Party MLA Akhilesh Pati Tripathi, was convicted of rioting and inciting attacks on the Burari police station in North Delhi in 2015. The court observed that the duo provoked the crowd, urging them to attack police personnel with statements such as, "policewalo ko sabak sikhane ka samay aa gaya hai" (the time has come to teach the police a lesson). The incident resulted in injuries to multiple police officers. Jha was subsequently sentenced to three months of imprisonment and fined ₹10,000.

== Member of Legislative Assembly (2020 - present) ==
Since 2020, he is an elected member of the 7th Delhi Assembly and 8th Delhi Assembly.

Committee assignments of Delhi Legislative Assembly

- Member (2022-2023), Public Accounts Committee

== Electoral performance ==
Delhi Assembly elections, 2013: Burari
Party	Candidate	Votes	%	±%
AAP	Sanjeev Jha	60,164	37.07	
BJP	Shri Krishan	49,813	30.69	+0.59
INC	Deepak Tyagi	31,649	19.50	−5.90
LJP	Vinod Nagar	6,462	3.98	−12.74
BSP	Kamal Sharma	3,664	2.26	−9.73
Independent	Surinder Routela	2,700	1.66	
NOTA	None	665	0.41	
Majority		10,351	6.38	+1.68
Turnout		1,62,530	65.96	
AAP gain from BJP		Swing		

Delhi Assembly elections, 2015: Burari
Party	Candidate	Votes	%	±%
AAP	Sanjeev Jha	1,24,724	63.82	+26.75
BJP	Gopal Jha	56,774	29.05	−1.64
INC	J. S. Chauhan	6,750	3.45	−16.05
BSP	Ranbir Kumar	2,343	1.19	−1.07
SUCI(C)	Manager Chaurasiya	930	0.47	+0.27
SS	Dharampal Singh	561	0.28	N/A
None of the Above	None of the above	413	0.21	−0.20
Majority		67,950	34.77	+28.39
Turnout		1,95,481	67.78	
AAP hold		Swing	+26.75	

Delhi Assembly elections, 2020: Burari
Party	Candidate	Votes	%	±%
AAP	Sanjeev Jha	139,598	62.81	−1.01
JD(U)	Shailendra Kumar	51,440	23.14	N/A
SS	Dharam Veer	18,044	8.12	+7.83
RJD	Pramod Tyagi	2,278	1.02	N/A
UKD	Ranjeet Singh	1,244	0.56	N/A
BSNP	Anil Kumar Yadav	1,210	0.54	N/A
None of the Above	None of the above	1,206	0.54	+0.33
Majority		88,158	39.67	+4.90
Turnout		2,22,391	61.48	−6.28
AAP hold		Swing	-1.01	

=== 2025 ===
Delhi Assembly elections, 2025: Burari
Party	Candidate	Votes	%	±%
AAP	Sanjeev Jha	121,181	47.57	▼15.24
JD(U)	Shailendra Kumar	100,580	39.48	▲16.34
INC	Mangesh Tyagi	19,920	7.82	New
NCP	Ratan Tyagi	3,852	1.51	
NOTA	None of the above	2,548	1.00	
Majority		20,601	8.09	
Turnout		253,548		
AAP hold		Swing		
