= Anil Jha Vats =

Indian politician (born 1974)

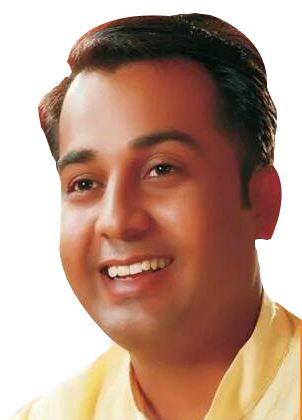

Deputy Leader of the Opposition in Delhi Legislative Assembly
- Incumbent
- Assumed office 23 February 2025
- Speaker: Vijender Gupta
- Leader of Opposition: Atishi Marlena
- Preceded by: Om Prakash Sharma

Member of Delhi Legislative Assembly
- Incumbent
- Assumed office 8 February 2025
- Preceded by: Rituraj Govind
- Constituency: Kirari
- In office 29 November 2008 – 10 February 2015
- Preceded by: Constituency established
- Succeeded by: Rituraj Govind
- Constituency: Kirari

Personal details
- Born: 24 August 1974 (age 51) Delhi, India
- Party: Aam Aadmi Party
- Other political affiliations: Bhartiya Janata Party
- Spouse: Poonam Parashar Jha
- Children: 2
- Occupation: Politician

Anil Jha Vats (born 24 August 1974) is an Indian politician from Delhi. He is the Deputy Leader of the Opposition in the Delhi Legislative Assembly and a three-time member of the Delhi Legislative Assembly from Kirari Assembly constituency. He won the 2025 Delhi Legislative Assembly election representing the Aam Aadmi Party. He was earlier a member of the Bharatiya Janata Party.

== Early life and education ==
Vats was born in Madhubani district in Bihar in 1974. He is the son of Anand Mohan Jha. He did his schooling from S.B. Mills Senior Secondary School, Shivaji Marg, Delhi in 1993. He did his BA at Satyawati College in 1996. He later did his post-graduation in arts at the Faculty of Arts, Delhi University in 2000. He also did a BA in library science from IGNOU in 2002. He is pursuing PhD from Department Of Buddhist studies Delhi University

== Career ==
Vats started his political career as a student leader and won the college union elections to become the president of Satyawati College. Later, he was elected as the president of Delhi University Students Union for the year 1997–98.

He first became an MLA winning the 2008 Delhi Legislative Assembly election from Kirari Assembly constituency and retained the seat in the 2013 Delhi Legislative Assembly election. He also served as the vice president of the BJP Delhi unit. He became an MLA for the third time winning the Kirari seat in the 2025 Delhi Legislative Assembly election on the Aam Aadmi Party ticket. He polled 105,780 votes and defeated his nearest rival, Bajrang Shukla of the Bharatiya Janata Party, by a margin of 21,871 votes. In the 2020 Assembly election, he lost the Kirari seat on the BJP ticket to Rituraj Govind of the AAP.
