= Akhilesh Pati Tripathi =

Indian politician (born 1984)

Member of Delhi Legislative Assembly
- In office Dec 2013 – Feb 2025
- Preceded by: Kanwar Karan Singh
- Succeeded by: Ashok Goel
- Constituency: Model Town

Personal details
- Party: Aam Aadmi Party

Akhilesh Pati Tripathi (born 20 January 1984) is an Indian politician and a former member of the Sixth Legislative Assembly of Delhi (M.L.A.). He was a member of Aam Aadmi Party and represented Model Town (Assembly constituency) of Delhi.

== Personal life ==
Akhilesh Pati Tripathi was born on 20 January 1984 in Mehdawal, Sant Kabir Nagar district, Uttar Pradesh. His father, Abhay Nandan Tripathi, was a schoolteacher.

Tripathi attended school in Mehdawal and graduated from ECC College, Allahabad. He completed his Master of Arts (MA) in History from Ram Manohar Lohia Avadh University, Faizabad, Uttar Pradesh, in 2008. He married Pratima Tripathi Pandey on 26 April 2016 and has two children.

In 2009, Tripathi moved to Delhi with aspirations to become an IAS officer. He passed the preliminary and main IAS exams twice but could not clear the interview round. Before entering politics, Tripathi worked as a private teacher. He currently resides in Azadpur, Delhi.

== Politics ==
Tripathi was a volunteer in the 2011 Indian anti-corruption movement led by Anna Hazare, where he campaigned alongside Arvind Kejriwal, encouraging youth to join the agitation. Initially opposed by his family, who wanted him to focus on his IAS exams, they later supported his decision. He subsequently joined the Aam Aadmi Party (AAP), which emerged from the movement.

In the December 2013 Delhi assembly elections, Tripathi won the Model Town seat, defeating Congress's Kanwar Karan Singh and BJP’s Ashok Goel by 7,875 votes. He promised a commercial area for traders and raised issues like the slums' ration mafia, which allegedly attacked him, leading to a hospital stay. Tripathi also highlighted the rape and murder of a girl in Rana Pratap Bagh and was arrested after BJP and Congress alleged his involvement in the rape-murder, then released after 12 days.

In January 2014, during a protest against Delhi Police, Tripathi was allegedly beaten by the police and hospitalized. The police denied these allegations.

After being renominated by AAP for the 2015 elections, Tripathi raised issues of women's safety and a citizen's fund for development. A day before the election, he was allegedly attacked by Congress workers caught distributing alcohol in Lalbagh slum, resulting in his hospitalization. He was admitted in Babu Jagjivan Ram Hospital's ICU and later shifted to LNJP Hospital in Daryaganj. Tripathi won re-election, defeating BJP’s Vivek Garg by 16,706 votes.

== Controversies and convictions ==
=== Assault convictions ===
Tripathi, along with another AAP MLA Sanjeev Jha, were convicted of rioting and inciting attacks on the Burari police station in North Delhi in 2015. The court found that both leaders provoked the crowd, urging them to attack police personnel with statements such as "policewalo ko sabak sikhane ka samay aa gaya hai" (the time has come to teach the police a lesson). The attack left multiple police personnel injured. Tripathi was sentenced to six months of imprisonment and fined ₹10,000.

Tripathi has also faced multiple allegations of assault in subsequent years. In July 2022, he was accused of assaulting residents of Model Town when they approached him to complain about local problems. Later, in December 2022, Tripathi was booked after a Delhi Jal Board (DJB) employee alleged that the MLA, along with a group of men, assaulted him at a sewage pumping station in Kalyan Vihar during an inquiry about sewage clearance. The employee required medical treatment following the incident and was admitted to BJRM Hospital.

In 2023, Akhilesh Pati Tripathi was convicted in a case involving the assault of a student, who was the son of an ex-councillor and a political rival. The incident occurred in 2020, just a day before the 2020 Delhi Legislative Assembly election. The student, who belonged to the Scheduled Caste (SC) category, alleged that Tripathi not only physically assaulted him but also directed casteist slurs at him during the altercation.

=== Cash for ticket case ===
In November 2022, Tripathi was implicated in a corruption case where he was accused of demanding ₹90 lakh from a woman in exchange for a party ticket for the 2022 Delhi Municipal Corporation election. A complaint was lodged by a man who alleged that Tripathi and another AAP MLA, Rajesh Gupta, had demanded the bribe in exchange for fielding his wife as the AAP candidate for Kamla Nagar Ward No. 69. The Anti-Corruption Branch (ACB) arrested three individuals connected to the case, including Tripathi’s brother-in-law and personal assistant. The Department of Vigilance, citing strong evidence including CCTV footage, recommended prosecution against Tripathi, the Lieutenant Governor referred the matter to the Delhi Assembly Speaker for sanction.

== Electoral performance ==
=== 2025 ===
Delhi Assembly elections, 2025
Party	Candidate	Votes	%	±%
BJP	Ashok Goel	52,108	54.1	▲12.64
AAP	Akhilesh Pati Tripathi	38,693	40.17	▼12.41
INC	Kanwar Karan Singh	3,908	4.06	▼0.02
NOTA	None of the above	685	0.4	
Majority		13,145	14.0	▲2.88
Turnout		95,633	53.8	▼5.74
BJP hold		Swing		

Delhi Assembly elections, 2020: Model Town
Party	Candidate	Votes	%	±%
AAP	Akhilesh Pati Tripathi	52,665	52.58	+0.20
BJP	Kapil Mishra	41,532	41.46	+5.10
INC	Akanksha Ola	4,085	4.08	−4.54
NOTA	None	841	0.84	+0.18
Majority		11,133	11.12	−4.94
Turnout		1,00,242	59.54	−8.32
AAP hold		Swing	+0.20	

State Legislative Assembly
Preceded by ?	Member of the Delhi Legislative Assembly from Model Town Assembly constituency 2020– 2025	Succeeded by Ashok Goel
