= Rajesh Gupta =

Indian politician (born 1978)

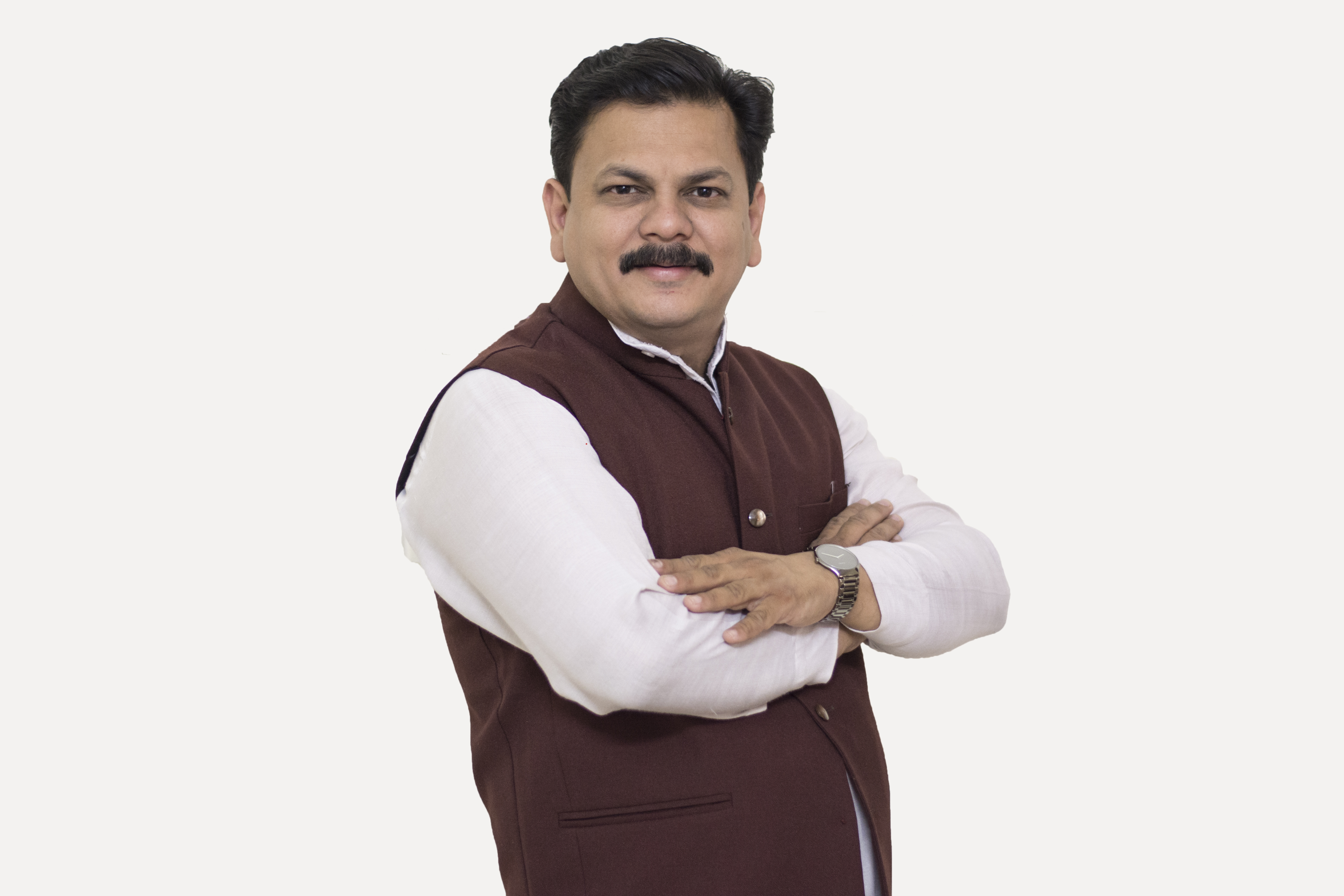

Member of the Delhi Legislative Assembly for Wazirpur
- In office Feb 2015 – 8th Feb 2025
- Preceded by: Mahender Nagpal
- Succeeded by: Poonam Sharma

Personal details
- Party: Bharatiya Janata Party
- Other political affiliations: Aam Aadmi Party 2015-2025
- Website: http://rajeshgupta.info

Rajesh Gupta (born 2 November 1978) is an Indian politician and former member of the Sixth Legislative Assembly of Delhi (MLA). He was also the MLA for second time from the same constituency, Wazirpur. He has also been the Parliamentary Secretary of Health in the state. Mr. Gupta also served as vice president of Delhi, Karnataka state prabhari and national spokesperson of Aam Aadmi Party and represented Wazirpur (Assembly constituency) of Delhi from 2015 to 2025.

== Early life ==
Rajesh Gupta was born and brought up in Delhi by his father Damodar Prasad Gupta and mother Asha Gupta.

His father was a successful businessman who ran shoes mfg. units in Delhi and nanded, Maharashtra. He originally hailed from sohna, Gurugram, Haryana.

His mother was a housewife born in Agra (UP) and raised in Mumbai, Maharashtra.

Rajesh Gupta is a graduate in history, completed his sr. secondary from Tyagi Public School. As a teenager, he was into theatre arts and performed street plays, nukkad nataks and stage plays. He went to New York, USA to be enrolled in New York Film Academy however he came back during the anti-corruption movement and left his family shoe business and a potential career in theatrics against the wishes of his guru Arvind Gaur of a well-known Asmita theatre to join Anna andolan and later joined Aam Aadmi Party.

== Career ==
Gupta actively participated in Anti-Corruption Protest led by Anna Hazare in 2011. He also took part in the campaigning during the 2013 Assembly elections.

In first AAP government in Delhi, he worked with then minister Satinder Jain and earn his name as a dedicated and trustworthy support of Arvind Kejriwal which eventually ask his to contest state assembly election which he won and was elected as Wazirpur MLA in the 2015 Delhi Elections. He secured 61,208 votes and defeated former MLA Mahander Nagpal of BJP and won by a margin of 22,044 votes.

He was the chairman of Committee on Estimate and Committee on Petition repeated times and was member of several committees.

He was also the vice president of Aam Aadmi Party, Delhi and prabhari (in charge) of Karnataka state AAP and in charge of North West loksabha Delhi

Mr. Gupta is a spokesperson of Aam Aadmi Party, who appears on T.V debates regularly.

In 2024 general elections, he was the member of AAP-Congress coordination committee and was also in charge of New Delhi loksabha.

Mr. Gupta ranked at top positions in Delhi Vidhsabha for his fearless debates, for raising maximum number of questions in vidhansabha for his constituency, for equal distribution of his MLA led fund, minimum criminal records and attendance by Praja foundation and other NGOs.

He gained popularity by running and cycling at five in the morning, visiting water UGRs and common people houses to solve drinking water crisis issue and was praised by his party top leadership as well as his opponents.

He Joined Bharatiya Janata Party on 29 November 2025 in the presence of Delhi BJP president Virendra Sachdeva, which was seen as a big jolt to AAP, as he was known to be very close to top party leaders like Arvind Kejriwal and Manish Sisodia.

== Controversies ==
In November 2022, Gupta, along with fellow AAP MLA Akhilesh Pati Tripathi, was implicated in a corruption case. He was accused of demanding ₹90 lakh from a man in exchange for a party ticket for the 2022 Delhi Municipal Corporation election. The complainant, a long-time AAP supporter, alleged that both MLAs had sought the bribe to fld [sic?] his wife as the AAP candidate for Kamla Nagar Ward No. 69. The Anti-Corruption Branch (ACB) arrested three individuals connected to the case, including Tripathi’s brother-in-law and personal assistant.

The matter came to light when the complainant, who had been associated with AAP since 2014, approached the ACB, alleging that Tripathi demanded ₹90 lakh to secure a ticket for his wife. The complainant paid ₹35 lakh to Tripathi and was also pressured to pay ₹20 lakh to Gupta. After the complainant found his wife’s name missing from the candidate list, Tripathi’s brother-in-law, Om Singh, assured him that they would secure a ticket in the next election. Based on strong evidence, including CCTV footage, the Department of Vigilance recommended prosecution against the accused with the matter referred to the Delhi Assembly Speaker for sanction.

== Electoral performance ==
=== 2025 ===
Delhi Assembly elections, 2025: Wazirpur
Party	Candidate	Votes	%	±%
BJP	Poonam Sharma	54,721	51.24	▲9.33
AAP	Rajesh Gupta	43,296	40.54	▼12.1
INC	Ragini Nayak	6,348	5.94	▲2.73
NOTA	None of the above	652	0.61	
Majority		11,425	10.70	▼0.03
Turnout		1,06,136	55.9	▼4.6
BJP gain from AAP		Swing		

Delhi Assembly elections, 2020: Wazirpur
Party	Candidate	Votes	%	±%
AAP	Rajesh Gupta	57,331	52.64	−2.21
BJP	Mahander Nagpal	45,641	41.91	+6.81
INC	Harikishan Jindal	3,501	3.21	−4.29
BSP	Mustqim Ahmed	889	0.82	−0.24
NOTA	None of the above	477	0.44	+0.02
Majority		11,690	10.73	−9.02
Turnout		1,09,654	60.50	−7.92
AAP hold		Swing	-2.21	

State Legislative Assembly
Preceded by ?	Member of the Delhi Legislative Assembly from Wazirpur Assembly constituency 2020– 2025	Succeeded by Poonam Sharma
