= Surinder Pal =

Surinder Pal may refer to:

- Surinder Pal Singh Cheema - retired Vice Admiral of Indian Navy, former FOC-in-C of Western and Southern Naval Commands.
- Surendra Pal - Indian Television actor.
- Surinder Pal Ratawal - Indian politician, member of Bharatiya Janata Party.
