= Ashk Ali Tak =

Indian politician (1956–2025)

Member of Parliament, Rajya Sabha
- In office 5 July 2010 – 4 July 2016
- Succeeded by: Om Prakash Mathur
- Constituency: Rajasthan

Personal details
- Born: 7 July 1956
- Died: 5 October 2025 (aged 69) Jaipur, Rajasthan, India
- Political party: Indian National Congress

Ashk Ali Tak (7 July 1956 – 5 October 2025) was an Indian politician from Rajasthan. He was Member of Parliament, Rajya Sabha from Rajasthan. Tak was elected in 2010. He was also member of Rajasthan Legislative Assembly from March 1985 to 15 October 1985, and December 1989 to March 1990. Tak was first Deputy Chief Whip in Rajasthan Legislative Assembly. He died in Jaipur on 5 October 2025, at the age of 69.

== Sources ==
- "Archived".
