= Om Prakash Mathur =

Indian politician and Governor of Kerala (born 1952)

- Mathur in 2026

Governor of Kerala
- Incumbent
- Assumed office 23 October 2026
- Appointed by: Droupadi Murmu
- Chief Minister: V. D. Satheesan
- Preceded by: Rajendra Arlekar

18th Governor of Sikkim
- In office 31 July 2024 – 19 October 2026
- Appointed by: Droupadi Murmu
- Chief Minister: Prem Singh Tamang
- Preceded by: Lakshman Prasad Acharya
- Succeeded by: Dushyant Kumar Gautam

Member of Parliament, Rajya Sabha
- In office 5 July 2016 – 4 July 2022
- Preceded by: Ashk Ali Tak
- Succeeded by: Randeep Surjewala
- Constituency: Rajasthan
- In office 10 April 2008 – 9 April 2014
- Constituency: Rajasthan

State President of Bharatiya Janata Party, Rajasthan
- In office 7 January 2008 – 13 July 2009
- Preceded by: Mahesh Chandra Sharma
- Succeeded by: Arun Chaturvedi

Personal details
- Born: 2 January 1952 (age 74) Bali, Rajasthan, India
- Party: Bharatiya Janata Party
- Education: University of Rajasthan (BA)

Om Prakash Mathur (born 2 January 1952) is an Indian politician who is the Governor of Kerala, since 23 October 2026. He previously served as the 18th Governor of Sikkim from July 2024 to October 2026. A veteran organisational leader of the Bharatiya Janata Party (BJP), he represented Rajasthan in the Rajya Sabha for two terms (2008–2014 and 2016–2022) and served as president of the Rajasthan BJP from 2008 to 2009.

== Early life and education ==
Mathur was born on 2 January 1952 in Bedal village near Falna in Bali tehsil of Pali district, Rajasthan. He completed his Bachelor of Arts degree from the University of Rajasthan in Jaipur.

== Political career ==
Mathur began his public life in 1972 as a pracharak (full-time worker) of the Rashtriya Swayamsevak Sangh (RSS) and later worked with the Bharatiya Kisan Sangh. Entering the Bharatiya Janata Party under the mentorship of former Rajasthan Chief Minister Bhairon Singh Shekhawat, he served as the General Secretary (Organisation) of the Rajasthan unit of the BJP from 1990 to 2002.

Between 2002 and 2008, Mathur held central organisational responsibilities for the BJP in Uttarakhand, Madhya Pradesh, and Gujarat. He was appointed a National Secretary of the BJP in 2005 and promoted to National General Secretary in 2006. On 7 January 2008, he was appointed State President of the Rajasthan BJP, serving in the post until 13 July 2009. In April 2008, he was elected to the Rajya Sabha from Rajasthan for his first six-year term, serving until April 2014.

Mathur subsequently served as the BJP's central election in-charge for the 2014 Maharashtra Legislative Assembly election and as state in-charge for Uttar Pradesh from 2014 to 2017, overseeing the party's campaign in the 2017 Uttar Pradesh Legislative Assembly election. He was appointed a National Vice President of the BJP in 2015. On 29 May 2016, he was nominated by the BJP for a second term in the Rajya Sabha from Rajasthan and was elected in the biennial elections held on 11 June 2016, serving from 5 July 2016 to 4 July 2022. In September 2022, he was appointed BJP state in-charge for Chhattisgarh ahead of the 2023 Chhattisgarh Legislative Assembly election.

== Governorships ==
=== Governor of Sikkim (2024–2026) ===
On 27 July 2024, President Droupadi Murmu appointed Mathur as the Governor of Sikkim, succeeding Lakshman Prasad Acharya. He was sworn in as the 18th Governor of Sikkim on 31 July 2024.

In June 2025, Mathur flagged off the first batch of pilgrims for the Kailash Mansarovar Yatra through the Nathu La pass following a five-year suspension of the route. On 20 October 2025, he visited Indian Army personnel stationed at the Doka La pass to mark Diwali. He demitted office on 19 October 2026 upon the swearing-in of his successor, Dushyant Kumar Gautam.

=== Governor of Kerala (2026- ) ===
On 12 October 2026, President Murmu transferred Mathur and appointed him as the 29th Governor of Keralam, succeeding Rajendra Arlekar, who was appointed Governor of Tamil Nadu. He was sworn in on 23 October 2026 at the Lok Bhavan Auditorium in Thiruvananthapuram by Chief Justice of the Kerala High Court Soumen Sen.
