= Krishan Tyagi =

Indian politician

Member of Delhi Legislative Assembly
- In office 2008–2013
- Succeeded by: Sanjeev Jha
- Constituency: Burari

Personal details
- Born: Delhi
- Party: Bharatiya Janata Party

Krishan Tyagi is politician and was MLA for Burari, New Delhi.

== See also ==
- Delhi Government
