= Naseeb Singh =

Indian politician

Member of Legislative Assembly for Vishwas Nagar
- In office 1998–2013
- Preceded by: Madan Lal Gaba
- Succeeded by: Om Prakash Sharma

Personal details
- Born: 1 January 1967 (age 59) Delhi
- Party: Bhartiya Janta Party
- Other political affiliations: Indian National Congress uptill 2024
- Height: 1.85 m (6 ft 1 in)
- Children: 3 (2 daughters, 1 son)
- Relatives: Captain Bhika Ram (grandfather)
- Education: Delhi University (BA)
- Profession: Politician

Naseeb Singh is an Indian politician who has been a member of the Second, Third and Fourth Legislative Assembly of Delhi. He is a member of Bhartiya Janta Party and former member of Indian National Congress and represented the Vishwas Nagar (Assembly constituency) of Delhi from 1998 to 2013.
