= Poonam Sharma =

Indian politician

Member of the Delhi Legislative Assembly
- Incumbent
- Assumed office 2025
- Preceded by: Rajesh Gupta
- Constituency: Wazirpur

Personal details
- Political party: Bharatiya Janata Party

Poonam Sharma is an Indian politician from Bharatiya Janata Party from Delhi. She was elected as a Member of the Legislative Assembly in the 8th Delhi Assembly from Wazirpur Assembly constituency, winning by 11,425 votes against Rajesh Gupta of the Aam Aadmi Party.
