= Ashok Goel (politician) =

Indian politician

Member of the Delhi Legislative Assembly
- Incumbent
- Assumed office 8 February 2025
- Preceded by: Akhilesh Pati Tripathi
- Constituency: Model Town

Personal details
- Political party: Bharatiya Janata Party

Ashok Goel is an Indian politician from Delhi who is affiliated with Bharatiya Janata Party. He was elected as a Member of the Legislative Assembly in the 8th Delhi Assembly from Model Town Assembly constituency.
