= Rituraj Govind =

Indian politician

Member of the Delhi Legislative Assembly for Kirari
- In office 2015–2025
- Preceded by: Anil Jha Vats
- Succeeded by: Anil Jha Vats

Personal details
- Party: AAP
- Children: 2

Rituraj Govind Jha is an Indian politician who served as a member of the Sixth Legislative Assembly of Delhi. He is a member of the AAP and a former MLA who represented Kirari (Assembly constituency) of Delhi.

== Early life and education ==
He comes from Chakdaulat - a small village in Bihar but he claims he is from Bihar to attract east side people voter residents in Delhi. He completed his schooling from Himalaya Public School, Karnal and Hotel Management from The Monarch International College of Hotel Management.

== See also ==
- Sixth Legislative Assembly of Delhi
- Delhi Legislative Assembly
- Government of India
- Politics of India
- Aam Aadmi Party

== Electoral performance ==
Delhi Assembly elections, 2020: Kirari
Party	Candidate	Votes	%	±%
AAP	Rituraj Govind	86,312	49.77	−11.89
BJP	Anil Jha Vats	80,658	46.51	+13.35
Independent	Kaushal Mishra	1,830	1.06	N/A
BSP	Rabindra Kumar Singh	1,557	0.90	−0.38
NOTA	None of the above	1,068	0.62	+0.09
Majority		5,654	3.26	−25.24
Turnout		1,73,502	63.36	−1.94
AAP hold		Swing	-11.89	

State Legislative Assembly
Preceded by ?	Member of the Delhi Legislative Assembly from Kirari Assembly constituency 2020–	Incumbent
