= Deep Chand Bandhu =

Indian politician (1931–2003)

Cabinet Minister, Government of Delhi
- In office December 2001 – September 2003
- Lieutenant Governor: Vijai Kapoor
- Chief Minister: Sheila Dikshit
- Ministry and Departments: Industry; Environment; Forest & Wild Life; Labour; Employment; Election

Member of the Delhi Legislative Assembly
- In office December 1993 – September 2003
- Preceded by: Constituency Established
- Succeeded by: Mange Ram Garg
- Constituency: Wazirpur

President of Delhi Pradesh Congress Committee
- In office 1994–1996
- Preceded by: H. K. Gaggal
- Succeeded by: Tajdar Babar

Personal details
- Born: 1931 Kondal, Palwal district, Haryana
- Died: 17 September 2003 (aged 71–72) New Delhi, India
- Party: Indian National Congress
- Education: D.A.V. College, Jalandhar

Deep Chand Bandhu (1931 – 17 September 2003) was an Indian politician affiliated with the Indian National Congress. He was a member of Delhi Legislative Assembly from 1993 to 2003 representing the Wazirpur Constituency and served as a minister in the Delhi government for several portfolios including Industry, Environment, Forest & Wild Life, Labour, Employment and Election from 2001 to 2003. He also served as the President of the Delhi Pradesh Congress Committee from 1994 to 1996.

== Early life and education ==
Bandhu was born in 1931 in Kondal village of the present-day Palwal district of Haryana. He belonged to Jat community. Many of his ancestors were freedom fighters, including Raja Nahar Singh who fought against the British in the Indian Rebellion of 1857. Bandhu had a post-graduate degree and was fascinated by the culture and history of India. He began his career as a teacher in Delhi after completing a teacher training course in 1949 from D.A.V. College, Jalandhar. Starting from 1952, he served as General Secretary and President of the Delhi Teachers Association until 1971. For five years, he also served as the President of All India Teachers Association.

== Political career ==
Bandhu's political career started with his election as a municipal councillor in 1971, following which he was designated as the Chairman of the Rural Areas Committee of the Delhi Municipal Corporation. Over the next two decades, he held several roles within the corporation, including Deputy Mayor in 1984. In 1985, he became the Chairman of the Standing Committee, which is considered the most significant committee of the corporation. He served as Chairman of the Appointments, Promotions, Disciplinary, and Allied Matters Committee while holding the role of Leader of the House within the corporation from 1985 and 1990.

After his tenure in the Municipal Corporation, he entered the Legislative Assembly in 1993, winning the election as a Member of the Legislative Assembly from Wazirpur Constituency. He was then chosen to serve as the Congress Legislature Party's chief whip, a position he held up until 1998. Following the 1998 elections, he was again elected as an MLA from the same constituency, obtaining the public's approval once more. Later, he received a nomination for the position of Deputy Leader of the Congress Legislature Party.

In 1972, Bandhu was put forward to join the Delhi Pradesh Congress Committee. He received a nomination for General Secretary two years later. He then joined the All India Congress Committee as a member in 1975. He was elected vice president of the Delhi Pradesh Congress Committee in 1987 and served in that capacity till 1994. He became the President of the Delhi Pradesh Congress Committee from 1994 to 1996. He also served on the Central Parliamentary Election Committee in 1996 as one of its members.

In 2001, The Government of Delhi assigned Bandhu the Minister of Industry, Environment, Forest & Wild Life, Labour, Employment, and Election.

== Electoral performance ==
Delhi Assembly elections, 1993: Wazirpur
Party	Candidate	Votes	%	±%
INC	Deep Chand Bandhu	26,150	43.13	
BJP	Mange Ram Garg	25,671	42.34	
JD	Umesh Khari	7,176	11.84	
BSP	Phool Chand Yada	780	1.29	
Independent	Rajendra Prasad	254	0.42	
DPP	Rajender	198	0.33	
SOP(RP)	Arvind Kumar	104	0.17	
Independent	Mukesh	82	0.14	
Independent	Ashwini Kumar	45	0.07	
Independent	Adishwar Jain	37	0.06	
Independent	Brij Mohan	36	0.06	
SP	Shankar Sharma	33	0.05	
Independent	Jagdev	33	0.05	
Independent	Desh Deepak Suri	31	0.05	
Majority		479	0.79	
Turnout		60,630	67.85	
INC win (new seat)				

Delhi Assembly elections, 1998: Wazirpur
Party	Candidate	Votes	%	±%
INC	Deep Chand Bandhu	36,010	59.69	+16.56
BJP	Shyam Lal Garg	21,132	35.03	−7.31
BSP	Rajender Prasad	1,450	2.40	+1.11
JD	Umesh Khari	1,413	2.34	
Independent	Chhimma Prasad	140	0.23	
RJD	Surender Kumar (Sajan)	54	0.09	
Independent	Brij Mohan Sharma	47	0.08	
Independent	Gyan Tyagi	44	0.07	
Independent	Sandeep Singh	32	0.05	
Independent	Uttam Kumar	9	0.01	
Majority		14,878	24.66	
Turnout		60,331	54.48	−13.37
INC hold		Swing		

1996 Indian general election: East Delhi
Party	Candidate	Votes	%	±%
BJP	Baikunth Lal Sharma	5,38,655	48.73	+8.46
INC	Deep Chand Bandhu	3,86,156	34.93	+2.88
JD	Chaudhari Kesari Singh	48,455	4.38	−16.70
AIIC(T)	Jitender Kumar	38,401	3.47	
Majority		1,52,499	13.80	+5.58
Turnout		11,05,410	50.54	+2.31
BJP hold		Swing	+8.46	

== Death ==
Bandhu died on 17 September 2003, at the age of 72, due to an infection in his intestine, coupled with multi-organ failure. Bandhu had been admitted to Apollo Hospital earlier that day as a result of the infection he had acquired. Immediately upon his admission to the ICU, he was placed on a ventilator to treat his rapidly worsening condition. He was cremated at Nigambodh crematorium the next day with all due state honors. Several senior members of the Congress and the Opposition attended the burial and offered their condolences, as did Sheila Dikshit, the chief minister. Dikshit praised Bandhu for his life-long service to people and the Congress party, and stated that his demise was a loss to both the government and the party.

=== Bungalow ===
The bungalow in which Bandhu died has gained notoriety for its alleged association with ill fortune, purportedly impacting the lives of its occupants. It was observed that those who lived there were unable to complete their terms in office. Many politicians and bureaucrats refused to reside in the bungalow, citing issues with its Vastu shastra. In 1952, the first Chief Minister of Delhi, Chaudhary Brahm Prakash, moved into the bungalow, but he was unable to finish his tenure. The same was the case with Madan Lal Khurana, who moved in 1993 and resigned in 1996 due to the Hawala scandal. Choudhary Mange Ram, an executive councillor and previous resident, also left office prematurely. Bandhu, who also lived in the bungalow, was unable to complete his tenure due to illness, leading to the bungalow being referred to as a "jinxed abode." After his death, the bungalow remained unoccupied for nearly a decade, leading the government to turn it into a guest house. The bungalow is located at 33 Shamnath Marg in North Delhi's Civil Lines area, and was once a prestigious address until Bandhu's death.

== Legacy ==
The Deep Chand Bandhu Hospital in Ashok Vihar, Delhi was inaugurated by Chief Minister Sheila Dikshit as a tribute to Bandhu's hard work and service towards the welfare of the people.
