= Burari Assembly constituency =

Legislative assembly seat in Delhi

Coordinates: 28.758°N 77.194°E

Burari
- Constituency No. 2 for the Delhi Legislative Assembly

Constituency details
- Country: India
- Region: North India
- State: Delhi
- District: Central Delhi
- Lok Sabha constituency: North East Delhi
- Established: 2008
- Reservation: None

Member of Legislative Assembly
- 8th Delhi Legislative Assembly
- Incumbent Sanjeev Jha
- Party: Aam Aadmi Party
- Elected year: 2025

Burari Assembly constituency is one of the seventy Delhi assembly constituencies of Delhi in northern India. Its center is the city of Burari. Burari assembly constituency is a part of North East Delhi Lok Sabha constituency. This constituency was created by reorganization by delimitation commission in 2008.

== Members of Legislative Assembly ==
Year	Member	Party
2008	Krishan Tyagi	Bharatiya Janata Party
2013	Sanjeev Jha	Aam Aadmi Party
2015	Sanjeev Jha	Aam Aadmi Party
2020	Sanjeev Jha	Aam Aadmi Party
2025	Sanjeev Jha	Aam Aadmi Party

== Election results ==
=== 2025 ===
Delhi Assembly elections, 2025: Burari
Party	Candidate	Votes	%	±%
AAP	Sanjeev Jha	121,181	47.57	▼15.24
JD(U)	Shailendra Kumar	100,580	39.48	▲16.34
INC	Mangesh Tyagi	19,920	7.82	New
NCP	Ratan Tyagi	3,852	1.51	
NOTA	None of the above	2,548	1.00	
Majority		20,601	8.09	
Turnout		253,548		
AAP hold		Swing		

=== 2020 ===
Delhi Assembly elections, 2020: Burari
Party	Candidate	Votes	%	±%
AAP	Sanjeev Jha	139,598	62.81	−1.01
JD(U)	Shailendra Kumar	51,440	23.14	N/A
SS	Dharam Veer	18,044	8.12	+7.83
RJD	Pramod Tyagi	2,278	1.02	N/A
UKD	Ranjeet Singh	1,244	0.56	N/A
BSNP	Anil Kumar Yadav	1,210	0.54	N/A
None of the Above	None of the above	1,206	0.54	+0.33
Majority		88,158	39.67	+4.90
Turnout		2,22,391	61.48	−6.28
AAP hold		Swing	-1.01	

=== 2015 ===
Delhi Assembly elections, 2015: Burari
Party	Candidate	Votes	%	±%
AAP	Sanjeev Jha	1,24,724	63.82	+26.75
BJP	Gopal Jha	56,774	29.05	−1.64
INC	J. S. Chauhan	6,750	3.45	−16.05
BSP	Ranbir Kumar	2,343	1.19	−1.07
SUCI(C)	Manager Chaurasiya	930	0.47	+0.27
SS	Dharampal Singh	561	0.28	N/A
None of the Above	None of the above	413	0.21	−0.20
Majority		67,950	34.77	+28.39
Turnout		1,95,481	67.78	
AAP hold		Swing	+26.75	

=== 2013 ===
Delhi Assembly elections, 2013: Burari
Party	Candidate	Votes	%	±%
AAP	Sanjeev Jha	60,164	37.07	
BJP	Shri Krishan	49,813	30.69	+0.59
INC	Deepak Tyagi	31,649	19.50	−5.90
LJP	Vinod Nagar	6,462	3.98	−12.74
BSP	Kamal Sharma	3,664	2.26	−9.73
Independent	Surinder Routela	2,700	1.66	
NOTA	None	665	0.41	
Majority		10,351	6.38	+1.68
Turnout		1,62,530	65.96	
AAP gain from BJP		Swing		

=== 2008 ===
Delhi Assembly elections, 2008: Burari
Party	Candidate	Votes	%	±%
BJP	Shri Krishan	32,006	30.10	
INC	Deepak Tyagi	27,016	25.40	
LJP	Vinod Nagar	17,777	16.72	
BSP	Anand Mohan Joshi	12,753	11.99	
NCP	Ram Kishore Tyagi	4,695	4.41	
RJD	Manoj Kumar	2,583	2.43	
JD(U)	Inder Singh	1,397	1.31	
Independent	Sandeep Kumar	1,020	0.96	
Independent	Dharmender Singhal	899	0.84	
BSKP	Ganesh Pal	771	0.72	
IJP	Munna Rawat	716	0.67	
Independent	Kamla Rani	579	0.54	
Independent	Sadhna Sharma	519	0.49	
RWS	Bhagwan Singh	441	0.41	
Independent	Ragini Sharma	437	0.41	
ABHM	Deen Dayal Singh	414	0.39	
RMEP	Lal Bahadur Singh	414	0.39	
SS	Babli	367	0.35	
NLHP	Hari Kishan	324	0.30	
Independent	Jai Ram Maurya	318	0.30	
Independent	Nafe Singh	272	0.26	
SP	Suraj Pal Singh	266	0.25	
Independent	Shivji Shah	221	0.21	
Independent	Rakesh Kumar	151	0.14	
Majority		4,990	4.70	
Turnout		106,346	55.9	
BJP win (new seat)				
