= Burari, Delhi =

Burari, बुराड़ी
- Neighborhood of Delhi
- Location within Delhi
- Coordinates: 28.75916°N 77.19380°E
- Country: India
- Union Territory: Delhi
- District: Central

Government
  - Type: Democracy
  - Body: State legislative assemblies of India

Area
  - Total: 11.2 km^{2} (4.3 sq mi)

Population (2026)
  - Total: 218,000 to 251,000
  - Density: 19,500/km^{2} (50,400/sq mi)

Languages
  - Official: Hindi, English
- Time zone: UTC+5:30 (IST)
- PIN: 110084

Burari is a residential area in the Central district of Delhi, India. The locality is bounded by the Outer Ring Road to the south and the Yamuna River to the east. It includes settlements such as Sant Nagar, Nathupura, Amrit Vihar, Baba Colony, I.P Colony, Pradhan Enclave, Uttarakhand Enclave, Bengali Colony and Kaushik Enclave. The nearest metro stations are Burari Metro Station on the Pink Line and Guru Teg Bahadur Nagar Metro Station on the Yellow Line, which provides connectivity to other parts of Delhi. Burari is also an Assembly constituency of the Delhi Legislative Assembly and includes Municipal Corporation of Delhi wards in the area.

== Geography ==
The neighbouring areas are Wazirabad, Bhalswa, Mukundpur, Jharoda, Nangli Poona, Swaroop Nagar, Gopalpur Village, Hiranki, Mukherjee Nagar.

== History ==
The Burari deaths occurred here in 2018, when 11 people of a family committed mass suicide for alleged cultist reasons.

== Languages and demographics ==
Historical population
Year	Pop.	±%
2001	69,333	—
2011	146,190	+110.9%
Source: Government of India

Hinduism	93.31%
Islam	3.62%
Sikhism	1.45%
Christianity	1.38%
Jainism	0.16%
Buddhism	0.04%
Others	0.04%
Religions in Burari (2011)

In 2011, Burari had a population of 146,190, with 78,103 males and 68,086 females. It had grown by 110.9% from 2001, when it had a population of 69,333. The average literacy rate of Burari is 88.98%, with male literacy at 94.17 and female literacy at 83.05 percent. The ratio between males and females is 872 females per 1000 males. The most prominent religion in Burari is Hinduism, with 93.3% of people being Hindu. The second most is Islam, but with only about 4%. The official language of this area is Hindi but other official languages include English and Urdu.
