= Model Town Assembly constituency =

Constituency of the Delhi legislative assembly in India

Coordinates: 28.718°N 77.192°E

Model Town
- Constituency No. 18 for the Delhi Legislative Assembly

Constituency details
- Country: India
- Region: North India
- State: Delhi
- District: North Delhi
- Established: 1993
- Reservation: None

Member of Legislative Assembly
- 8th Delhi Legislative Assembly
- Incumbent Ashok Goel
- Party: Bharatiya Janata Party
- Elected year: 2025

Model Town Assembly constituency is one of the 70 constituencies of Delhi Legislative Assembly in northern India. Model Town assembly constituency is a part of Chandni Chowk (Lok Sabha constituency). Model town is one of the posh areas in the North Delhi region. It is divided into parts viz. Model town 1 Model town 2 & Model town 3.

== Members of the Legislative Assembly ==
Year	Member	Party
1993	Charti Lal Goel	Bharatiya Janata Party
1998	Kanwar Karan Singh	Indian National Congress
2003	Kanwar Karan Singh	Indian National Congress
2008	Kanwar Karan Singh	Indian National Congress
2013	Akhilesh Pati Tripathi	Aam Aadmi Party
2015	Akhilesh Pati Tripathi	Aam Aadmi Party
2020	Akhilesh Pati Tripathi	Aam Aadmi Party
2025	Ashok Goel	Bharatiya Janata Party

== Election results ==
Vote share of winning candidates
2025	54.10%
2020	52.58%
2015	52.38%
2013	39.84%
2008	46.87%
2003	45.17%
1998	55.75%
1993	44.29%

=== 2025 ===
Delhi Assembly elections, 2025
Party	Candidate	Votes	%	±%
BJP	Ashok Goel	52,108	54.1	▲12.64
AAP	Akhilesh Pati Tripathi	38,693	40.17	▼12.41
INC	Kanwar Karan Singh	3,908	4.06	▼0.02
NOTA	None of the above	685	0.4	
Majority		13,145	14.0	▲2.88
Turnout		95,633	53.8	▼5.74
BJP hold		Swing		

=== 2020 ===
Delhi Assembly elections, 2020: Model Town
Party	Candidate	Votes	%	±%
AAP	Akhilesh Pati Tripathi	52,665	52.58	+0.20
BJP	Kapil Mishra	41,532	41.46	+5.10
INC	Akanksha Ola	4,085	4.08	−4.54
NOTA	None	841	0.84	+0.18
Majority		11,133	11.12	−4.94
Turnout		1,00,242	59.54	−8.32
AAP hold		Swing	+0.20	

=== 2015 ===
Delhi Assembly elections, 2015: Model Town
Party	Candidate	Votes	%	±%
AAP	Akhilesh Pati Tripathi	54,628	52.38	+12.54
BJP	Vivek Garg	37,922	36.36	−3.33
INC	Kanwar Karan Singh	8,992	8.62	−16.20
BSP	Jeetender	601	0.58	−0.74
NOTA	None	690	0.66	−0.11
Majority		16,706	16.02	+7.87
Turnout		1,04,312	67.88	
AAP hold		Swing	+12.54	

=== 2013 ===
Delhi Assembly elections, 2013: Model Town
Party	Candidate	Votes	%	±%
AAP	Akhilesh Pati Tripathi	38,492	39.84	
BJP	Ashok Goel	30,617	31.69	−11.67
INC	Kanwar Karan Singh	23,983	24.82	−22.05
BSP	Chander Pal	1,279	1.32	−6.18
JD(U)	Alihadi	473	0.49	
Independent	Harish Arora	314	0.33	
Independent	Ram Prakash	309	0.32	
PECP	Meena Begum	176	0.18	
Independent	Lalit Kumar	92	0.10	
Independent	Raju Prasad	82	0.08	
Independent	Devi Dass Sharma	52	0.05	
NOTA	None of the Above	741	0.77	
Majority		7,875	8.15	
Turnout		96,835	68.53	+10.00
AAP gain from INC		Swing		

=== 2008 ===
Delhi Assembly elections, 2008: Model Town
Party	Candidate	Votes	%	±%
INC	Kanwar Karan Singh	39,935	46.87	+1.70
BJP	Bhola Nath Vij	36,936	43.36	+6.83
BSP	Solomon George	6,388	7.50	+2.51
Independent	Sahansar Pal	586	0.69	
SP	Satya Narayain Yadav	333	0.39	+0.05
LJP	Javed Aalam Khan	223	0.26	
RALP	Jai Veer	222	0.26	
MBP	Sunil Tiwari	222	0.26	
Independent	Vinod Kumar	201	0.24	
Independent	Manoj Kaushik	75	0.09	
Independent	Baij Nath Singh	74	0.09	
Majority		2,997	3.51	
Turnout		85,197	58.53	+7.20
INC hold		Swing		

=== 2003 ===
Delhi Assembly elections, 2003: Model Town
Party	Candidate	Votes	%	±%
INC	Kanwar Karan Singh	24,660	45.17	−10.58
BJP	Ashok Aggarwal	19,944	36.53	−0.17
LJP	Vinod Nagar	6,277	11.50	
BSP	Makhan Lal	2,727	4.99	+1.90
Independent	Shambhu Nath Mishra	308	0.56	
AIFB	Satish Jha	254	0.47	
SP	Ram Adhar	183	0.34	
RSP(U)	Sanjay Gandhi	153	0.28	
JPJD	Rajender Kumar Sharma	90	0.16	
Majority		4,716	8.64	−
Turnout		54,596	51.33	−0.56
INC hold		Swing		

=== 1998 ===
Delhi Assembly elections, 1998: Model Town
Party	Candidate	Votes	%	±%
INC	Kanwar Karan Singh	32,315	55.75	+15.80
BJP	Bhola Nath Vij	21,276	36.70	−7.59
BSP	M L Ram	1,791	3.09	+0.64
JD	Suresh kumar Sonkar	1,023	1.76	−8.98
Independent	Tara Shankar	399	0.69	
Independent	Pt Makhan Lal	361	0.62	
Independent	Ram Adhar	261	0.45	
SS	Manoranjan Sehgal	203	0.35	−0.48
Independent	Deepak Kakkar	183	0.32	
Independent	Jagdish	65	0.11	
Independent	Vinod Kumar Jain	24	0.04	
Independent	Surendra Singh	23	0.04	
Independent	Jai Prakash	17	0.03	
Independent	Harjinder Singh Gehlot	14	0.02	
Independent	Amit	12	0.02	
Majority		11,039	19.05	
Turnout		57,967	51.89	−11.77
INC gain from BJP		Swing		

=== 1993 ===
Delhi Assembly elections, 1993: Model Town
Party	Candidate	Votes	%	±%
BJP	Chatri Lal Goel	23,870	44.29	
INC	Kanwar Karan Singh	21,532	39.95	
JD	Suresh Kumar Sonkar	5,789	10.74	
BSP	Pati Ram	1,319	2.45	
SS	Ashish Bhasin	445	0.83	
Independent	Tanvir	213	0.40	
Independent	Mahendra	158	0.29	
Independent	Shyam Pal	124	0.23	
Independent	Parshu Ram	120	0.22	
Independent	Shushil Goel	96	0.18	
SP	Harphhol Singh Kashyap	43	0.08	
Independent	Chander Shekher	36	0.07	
Independent	Kamlesh Kumar	29	0.05	
Independent	Jagdish	23	0.04	
Independent	Surendra Singh	23	0.04	
Independent	Mohd Nisar Khan	22	0.04	
BMD	Suresh	21	0.04	
Independent	Shri Pal Gupta	19	0.04	
Independent	Ajay Narula	11	0.02	
Majority		2,338	4.34	
Turnout		53,893	63.67	
BJP win (new seat)				
