= Jharoda Majra Burari =

- Town
- Location in India
- Coordinates: 28.7296°N 77.2086°E
- Country: India
- State: Delhi
- District: North Delhi

Population (2011)
  - Total: 13,301

Languages
  - Official: Hindi, English
- Time zone: UTC+5:30 (IST)
- PIN: 110084

Jharoda Majra Burari is a census town in North Delhi District in the National Capital Territory of Delhi, India. It is a municipal corporation in New Delhi. It is divided into three areas: Jharoda part 01, Jharoda part 02, and Jharoda part 03

== Demographics ==
As of 2001 India census, Jharoda Majra Burari had a population of 13,301. Males constitute 56% of the population and females 44%. Jharoda Majra Burari has an average literacy rate of 66%, higher than the national average of 59.5%: male literacy is 72%, and female literacy is 57%. In Jharoda Majra Burari, 17% of the population is under 6 years of age. Asia's Largest Yamuna Bio Diversity Park is Between Jharoda Majra Burari And Sangam Vihar.
