= Nangli Poona =

Nangli Poona Nangli Poona Nangli Puna
- Village/Neighbourhood
- NANGLI POONA VILLAGE
- Location in Delhi, India
- Coordinates: 28.7741°N 77.1456°E
- Country: India
- Union Territory: Delhi
- District: North West Delhi
- Subdivision: Narela

Government
  - Type: Village Panchayat
  - Body: Municipal Corporation of Delhi

Population (2011)
  - Total: 3,840

Languages
  - Official: Haryanvi, Hindi, English
- Time zone: UTC+5:30 (IST)
- PIN: 110036
- Civic agency: North Delhi Municipal Corporation

Nangli Poona is a small village in northwest Delhi near Jain mandir. The area is in Burari constituency.

== Location ==
Nangli Poona is on the road to Panipat and on the GT Karnal Road in the west and Yamuna River in the east. Nangli is a Marathi word which means relocated/relocation, and the suffix Poona suggests connection to Poona, the capital of Maratha kingdom in the 18th century which is the same as the Marathas of Pune belt (rane).

A cursory glance of the village shows a striking resemblance of Maratha architecture. The short structured build of the inhabitants, high cheekbones, deep eyes, dark complexion, and sharp nose points towards Maratha ancestry.

Historically, Nangli Poona remained a agrarian settlement for centuries. Due to its location on the Delhi-Panipat route (modern GT Karnal Road), it developed importance as a roadside village connected with trade and movement between Delhi and northern India. Over time, urbanization expanded around the area, especially after Delhi's growth in the late 20th and early 21st centuries.

According to Census 2011 data, Nangli Poona had a population of around 3,840 people and roughly covered 257 hectares of land. The village is now increasingly integrated into the urban landscapes of Delhi, with nearby educational projects, transport infrastructure, and industrial activity contributing to its transformation.

This village has received several leaders such as the likes of CHAUDHARY SHIVLAL RANA SARPANCH who have taken this village to better prospects. His lineage still continues to serve this village as he did.

Ashok Leyland opened its dealership in the area in May 2024.
