= Dushyant Kumar Gautam =

Indian politician (born 1957) and Governor of Sikkim

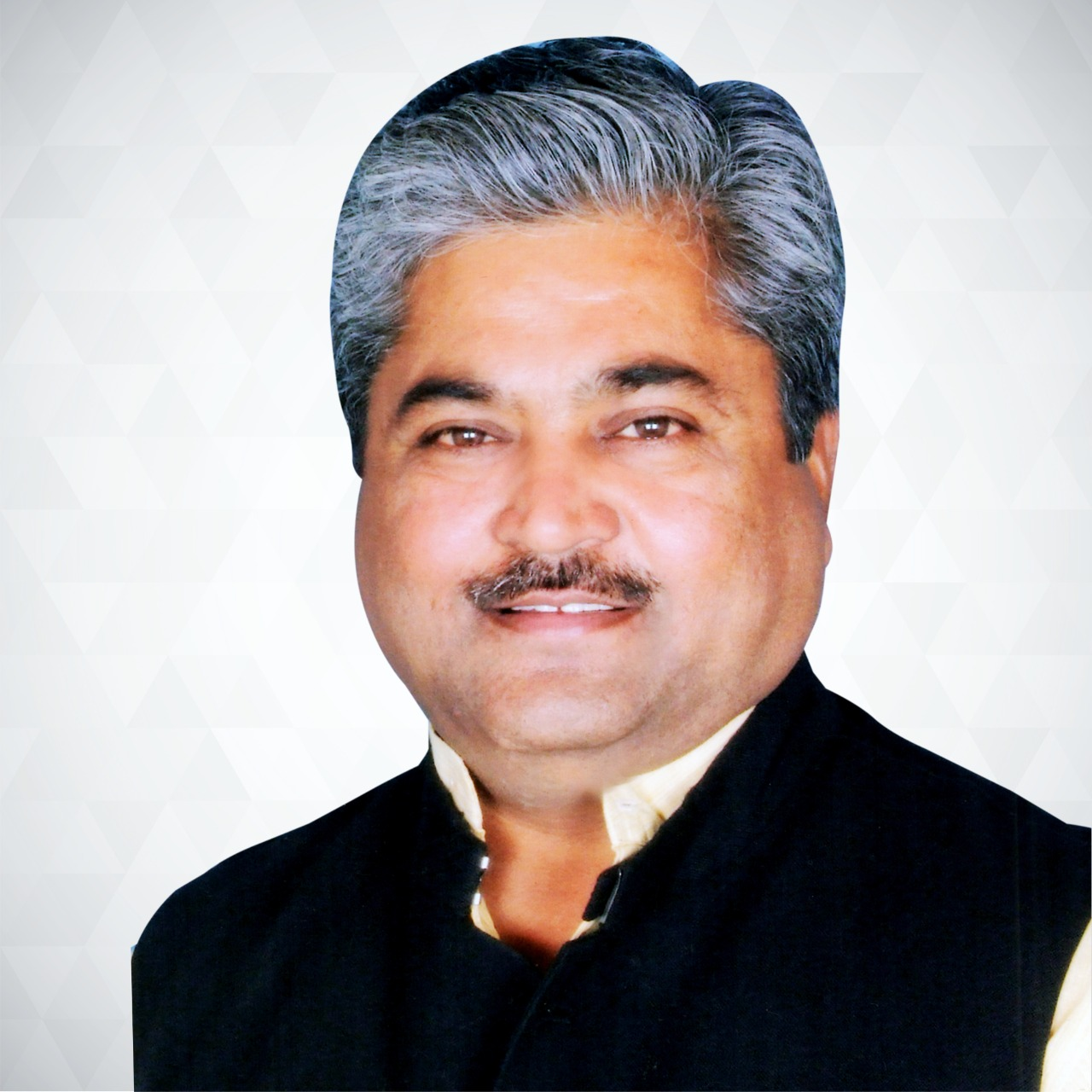

21st Governor of Sikkim
- Incumbent
- Assumed office 19 October 2026
- Preceded by: Om Prakash Mathur

General Secretary of the Bharatiya Janata Party
- In office September 2020 – August 2026
- President: J. P. Nadda

Member of Parliament, Rajya Sabha
- In office 19 March 2020 – 1 August 2022
- Succeeded by: Krishan Lal Panwar
- Constituency: Haryana

Personal details
- Born: 29 December 1957 (age 68) Delhi, India
- Party: Bharatiya Janata Party
- Education: Delhi University
- Profession: Politician

Dushyant Kumar Gautam is Governor of Sikkim, an Indian politician and a National General Secretary of the Bhartiya Janata Party. He was elected to the Rajya Sabha, the upper house of Indian Parliament, from Haryana as a member of the BJP. He has been associated with the Scheduled Caste Morcha of the BJP for quite a long time. He has also contested the MCD and Delhi Legislative Assembly election from Kondli (SC) and Karol Bagh (SC) unsuccessfully in the 2008 & 2013 and 2025 elections, getting 21,594 & 29,373 and 44,867 votes, respectively. He served as Member of the Rajya Sabha of Haryana for the remaining 2.5 years term during 2020-2022 of former INLD leader Ram Kumar Kashyap who resigned after being elected an MLA from Indri Assembly Constituency of Karnal district in 2019 Haryana Legislative Assembly.

== Early life and education ==
Dushyant Kumar Gautam was born on 29 December 1957 in Malkaganj, Delhi, India, in Chamar family to Padam Singh Gautam and Javitri Devi. He completed a Bachelor of Arts degree at the University of Delhi in 1978 through its Correspondence College, according to his election affidavit.

== Political career ==
Gautam served as a municipal councilor in Vasant Vihar, Delhi, from 1997 to 2002. He subsequently became active in the BJP's organizational activities and was associated with the party's Scheduled Caste Morcha. He was appointed as the national president of the SC Morcha unit of the party in 2014.

=== Rajya Sabha ===
In March 2020, Gautam was elected unopposed to the Rajya Sabha from Haryana as a BJP candidate. During his parliamentary tenure, he served on the Parliamentary Standing Committee on Labor.

=== Bharatiya Janata Party ===
Gautam served as a national general secretary of the BJP from September 2020. In August 2026, he was dropped from the party's national office-bearer team during an organizational reshuffle.

=== 2025 Delhi Assembly election ===
Gautam contested the 2025 Delhi Legislative Assembly election from the Karol Bagh constituency as a BJP candidate. He received 44,867 votes and was defeated by Aam Aadmi Party candidate Vishesh Ravi, who received 52,297 votes.

=== Governor of Sikkim ===
On 12 October 2026, President of India Droupadi Murmu appointed Dushyant Kumar Gautam as the 21st Governor of Sikkim, succeeding Om Prakash Mathur. The appointment will take effect from the date he assumes charge of the office.

== See also ==
- Chamar
- Ravidassia
- Jatav
