= Mange Ram Garg =

Indian politician (died 2019)

Mange Ram Garg (1935/1936 – 21 July 2019) was a leader of Bharatiya Janata Party and a member of Delhi Legislative Assembly. A confectioner by profession, Garg joined active politics comparatively late but took massive strides in the ensuing years. He registered his first political win of note in 2003 when he won from the Wazirpur assembly constituency. In the next Assembly election - in 2008, Garg lost to Hari Shanker Gupta of Indian National Congress by about 3,000 votes. He was entrusted with many significant responsibilities of BJP in Delhi during his political life. Under him, BJP registered strong performances in local municipal body elections.

He pledged his organs to Dadhichi Deh Dan Samiti. Accordingly, his mortal remains were taken to Lady Hardinge Medical College after his death.
