= Mahander Nagpal =

Indian politician

Mahander Nagpal (born 18 April 1959) is an Indian politician from Bharatiya Janata Party and a former member of the Delhi Legislative Assembly. He was elected as a Councillor of Municipal Corporation of Delhi in 1997. In 2013 he was elected to Delhi assembly from Wazirpur.

== See also ==
- 2015 Delhi Legislative Assembly election
- 5th Delhi Assembly
