= Mukand Pur =

Mukund Pur
- census town
- Location in India
- Country: India
- Union Territory: Delhi
- District: North Delhi

Government
  - Body: BJP

Population (2011)
  - Total: 57,135

Languages
  - Official: Hindi
- Time zone: UTC+5:30 (IST)
- Pin Code: 110042

Mukund Pur is a census town in North Delhi district in the Indian territory of Delhi. Mukund Pur is situated in North Delhi, in the Burari constituency. The small town has one of the highest population densities among areas of Delhi. Mukundpur falls under the Burari Vidhan Sabha constituency. Its PIN code is 110042, and a majority of residents speak Bhojpuri.

Infrastructure Bhalswa Mukundpur Lake is a water body located in North Delhi near Mukundpur area. It is surrounded by developing infrastructure and forest land, playing an important role in local ecology and urban development.
