= Karol Bagh Assembly constituency =

Constituency of the Delhi legislative assembly in India

Coordinates: 28.65°N 77.19°E

Karol Bagh
- Constituency No. 23 for the Delhi Legislative Assembly

Constituency details
- Country: India
- Region: North India
- State: Delhi
- District: New Delhi
- Lok Sabha constituency: New Delhi
- Reservation: SC

Member of Legislative Assembly
- 8th Delhi Legislative Assembly
- Incumbent Vishesh Ravi
- Party: AAP
- Elected year: 2025

Karol Bagh is one of the 70 legislative assembly constituencies of Delhi in northern India. The Karol Bagh assembly constituency is a part of New Delhi (Lok Sabha constituency).

== Members of the Legislative Assembly ==
Year	Member	Party
1993	Surendra Pal Ratawal	Bharatiya Janata Party
1998	Moti Lal Bokolia	Indian National Congress
2003	Surendra Pal Ratawal	Bharatiya Janata Party
2008	Surendra Pal Ratawal	Bharatiya Janata Party
2013	Vishesh Ravi	Aam Aadmi Party
2015	Vishesh Ravi	Aam Aadmi Party
2020	Vishesh Ravi	Aam Aadmi Party
2025	Vishesh Ravi	Aam Aadmi Party

== Election results ==
=== 2025 ===
Delhi Assembly elections, 2025: Karol Bagh
Party	Candidate	Votes	%	±%
AAP	Vishesh Ravi	52,297		
BJP	Dushyant Kumar Gautam	44867		
INC	Rahul Dhanak	4252		
BSP	Ranjeet Kumar Gangwal	626		
NOTA	None of the above	548		
Majority		7430		
Turnout				
		Swing		

=== 2020 ===
Delhi Assembly elections, 2020: Karol Bagh
Party	Candidate	Votes	%	±%
AAP	Vishesh Ravi	67,494	62.23	+2.43
BJP	Yogender Chandoliya	35,734	32.95	+2.31
INC	Gourav Kumar	3,365	3.10	−5.01
BSP	Lekhraj Jatav	783	0.72	+0.22
NOTA	None of the above	447	0.41	+0.05
SS	Gaurav	192	0.18	
Majority		31,760	29.28	+0.12
Turnout		1,08,514	61.16	−7.28
AAP hold		Swing	+2.43	

=== 2015 ===
Delhi Assembly elections, 2015: Karol Bagh
Party	Candidate	Votes	%	±%
AAP	Vishesh Ravi	67,429	59.80	+24.74
BJP	Yogender Chandoliya	34,549	30.64	−2.70
INC	Madan Khorwal	9,144	8.10	−20.63
BSP	Yogesh	559	0.50	−0.67
NOTA	None of the above	411	0.36	−0.49
Majority		32,880	29.16	+27.45
Turnout		1,12,819	68.48	
AAP hold		Swing	+13.72	

=== 2013 ===
Delhi Assembly elections, 2013: Karol Bagh
Party	Candidate	Votes	%	±%
AAP	Vishesh Ravi	35,818	35.06	
BJP	Surender Pal Ratawal	34,068	33.34	−12.37
INC	Madan Khorwal	29,358	28.73	−12.96
BSP	Jawahar Singh	1,200	1.17	−7.74
SP	Ranjan Khatumaria	491	0.48	
LJP	Gyan Chand	171	0.17	−0.20
Independent	Parveen Kumar	119	0.12	
Independent	Manoj Kumar	110	0.11	
Independent	Kiran	66	0.06	
NOTA	None	768	0.75	
Majority		1,750	1.71	−2.31
Turnout		1,02,316	67.34	
AAP gain from BJP		Swing		

=== 2008 ===
Delhi Assembly elections, 2008: Karol Bagh
Party	Candidate	Votes	%	±%
BJP	Surender Pal Rathawal	38,746	45.71	−1.14
INC	Madan Khorwal	35,338	41.69	−3.31
BSP	Veena Singh	7,555	8.91	+3.45
CPI(M)	Nathu Prasad	1,496	1.77	
Independent	Ram Babu	429	0.51	
NCP	Rajesh Kumar Gihara	375	0.44	+0.02
LJP	Gyan Chand	312	0.37	
AIMF	Vijay Kumar	208	0.25	
Independent	Yogesh	167	0.20	
Independent	Madan Lal Suryawanshi	130	0.15	
Majority		3,408	4.02	+2.17
Turnout		84,756	59.6	+5.30
BJP hold		Swing	-1.14	

=== 2003 ===
Delhi Assembly elections, 2003: Karol Bagh
Party	Candidate	Votes	%	±%
BJP	Surender Pal Ratawal	21,812	46.85	+0.39
INC	Durgesh Mohanpura	20,953	45.00	−5.91
BSP	Y R Dhuriya	2,544	5.46	+4.33
SS	Yogesh Narayan	293	0.63	+0.57
AITC	Dev Dass	289	0.62	
NCP	Sunil Kumar Alias Sunil Sawaria	197	0.42	
Independent	Raju	165	0.35	
Independent	Suresh Kumar	164	0.35	
Independent	Mahender Kumar	58	0.12	
Independent	Mohan Kumar	49	0.38	
Independent	Narender Kumar	38	0.08	
Majority		859	1.85	+2.60
Turnout		46,562	54.30	+1.86
BJP gain from INC		Swing	+0.39	

=== 1998 ===
Delhi Assembly elections, 1998: Karol Bagh
Party	Candidate	Votes	%	±%
INC	Moti Lal Bokolia	26,466	50.91	+21.17
BJP	Surender Pal Ratawal	24,154	46.46	−5.27
BSP	Rohtash	588	1.13	+0.35
JD	Ajay Harit	300	0.58	−12.28
Independent	Krishan Kumar Rajora	262	0.50	
Lok Shakti	Partap Singh	117	0.23	
Independent	Jitendra Kumar	59	0.11	
SS	Madan Lal Suryavanshi	29	0.06	
Independent	Harish Chandra	15	0.03	
Majority		2,312	4.45	−17.54
Turnout		51,990	52.44	+0.71
INC gain from BJP		Swing	+21.17	

=== 1993 ===
Delhi Assembly elections, 1993: Karol Bagh
Party	Candidate	Votes	%	±%
BJP	Surender Pal Ratawal	26,794	51.73	
INC	Sunderwati Naval Prabhakar	15,405	29.74	
JD	Shyam Babu	7,182	13.86	
Independent	Karan Singh Tanwar	665	1.28	
Independent	Trilok Chand Sanwariya	590	1.14	
BSP	Kamal Kishore	403	0.78	
Independent	Partap Singh	203	0.39	
Independent	Roop Kishore	100	0.19	
Independent	Desh Raj	97	0.19	
Independent	Chain Sukh	96	0.19	
Independent	Sarwan Kumar	63	0.12	
Independent	Lakshman Kumar	50	0.10	
Independent	Vinod Kumar	43	0.08	
Independent	Puran Chand	42	0.08	
Independent	Kishan Bharti	37	0.07	
Independent	Vijay Kumar	30	0.06	
Majority		11,389	21.99	
Turnout		51,800	62.06	
BJP hold		Swing		
