= Kirari Assembly constituency =

Constituency of the Delhi legislative assembly in India

Coordinates: 28.700°N 77.048°E

Kirari
- Constituency No. 9 for the Delhi Legislative Assembly

Constituency details
- Country: India
- Region: North India
- State: Delhi
- District: North West Delhi
- Established: 2008
- Reservation: None

Member of Legislative Assembly
- 8th Delhi Legislative Assembly
- Incumbent Anil Jha Vats
- Party: AAP
- Elected year: 2025

Kirari Assembly constituency is one of the seventy Delhi assembly constituencies of Delhi in northern India. Kirari assembly constituency is a part of North West Delhi (Lok Sabha constituency). This constituency was created by reorganization by delimitation commission in 2008. The geographical area of Kirari Assembly Constituency is roughly 2820 acres. There are 106 unauthorized colonies and three villages in this area. Each colony & village is lawfully maintained & locally governed by a functional R.W.A, headed by their respective R.W.A Presidents.

There is also an active registered organization namely Kirari R.W.A Federation, working in Kirari Assembly Constituency area which works as an umbrella organization for all the functional as well as dysfunctional R.W.As of Kirari area. The federation is centrally governed by the federal cabinet. The head of the federation is known as Federal President. The current federal president of Kirari R.W.A Federation is Mr. Ajay Vats.

== Members of the Legislative Assembly ==
Year	Member	Party
2008	Anil Jha Vats	Bharatiya Janata Party
2013	Anil Jha Vats	Bharatiya Janata Party
2015	Rituraj Govind	Aam Aadmi Party
2020	Rituraj Govind	Aam Aadmi Party
2025	Anil Jha Vats	Aam Aadmi Party

== Election results ==
=== 2025 ===
Delhi Assembly elections, 2025: Kirari
Party	Candidate	Votes	%	±%
AAP	Anil Jha Vats	105,780	52.25	
BJP	Bajrang Shukla	83,909	41.45	
INC	Rajesh Gupta	6864	3.39	
BSP	Jagbir Singh	2128	1.05	
ASP(KR)	Malik Niaz Ahmad	885	0.43	
Independent	Prakash Shrivastav	588	0.29	
Independent	Rakesh	473	0.23	
Rashtriya Manav Party	Sudesh Sharma	212	0.10	
PECP	Afsana Sarwar	208	0.10	
NOTA	None of the above	1366		
Majority		21,871		
Turnout		2,02,413		
AAP hold		Swing		

=== 2020 ===
Delhi Assembly elections, 2020: Kirari
Party	Candidate	Votes	%	±%
AAP	Rituraj Govind	86,312	49.77	−11.89
BJP	Anil Jha Vats	80,658	46.51	+13.35
Independent	Kaushal Mishra	1,830	1.06	N/A
BSP	Rabindra Kumar Singh	1,557	0.90	−0.38
NOTA	None of the above	1,068	0.62	+0.09
Majority		5,654	3.26	−25.24
Turnout		1,73,502	63.36	−1.94
AAP hold		Swing	-11.89	

=== 2015 ===
Delhi Assembly elections, 2015: Kirari
Party	Candidate	Votes	%	±%
AAP	Rituraj Govind	97,727	61.66	+44.52
BJP	Anil Jha Vats	52,555	33.16	−18.99
INC	Pratyush Kanth	2,086	1.31	−12.05
BSP	D. N. Bhagat Kushwaha	2,021	1.27	−10.94
NCP	Abhinav Prajapati	224	0.14	−0.34
SS	Rajinder Kumar	173	0.10	N/A
NOTA	None of the above	840	0.53	+0.14
Majority		45,172	28.50	−6.51
Turnout		1,58,505	65.27	
AAP gain from BJP		Swing	+35.03	

=== 2013 ===
Delhi Assembly elections, 2013: Kirari
Party	Candidate	Votes	%	±%
BJP	Anil Jha Vats	72,283	52.15	+19.42
AAP	Rajan Prakash	23,757	17.14	
INC	Amit Malik	18,515	13.36	−3.52
BSP	Pushp Raj	16,922	12.21	+0.61
NOTA	None	534	0.39	
Majority		48,526	35.01	24.62
Turnout		138,662	64.21	
BJP hold		Swing	+19.42	

=== 2008 ===
Delhi Assembly elections, 2008: Kirari
Party	Candidate	Votes	%	±%
BJP	Anil Jha Vats	30,005	32.73	
NCP	Pushpraj	20,481	22.34	
INC	Shabnam	15,472	16.88	
BSP	Ram Pal Singh	10,633	11.60	
Majority		9,524	10.39	
Turnout		91,669	57.9	
BJP win (new seat)				
