= Vishwas Nagar Assembly constituency =

Constituency of the Delhi legislative assembly in India

Coordinates: 28.662°N 77.296°E

Vishwas Nagar
- Constituency No. 59 for the Delhi Legislative Assembly

Constituency details
- Country: India
- Region: North India
- State: Delhi
- District: Shahdara
- Lok Sabha constituency: East Delhi
- Established: 1951
- Reservation: None

Member of Legislative Assembly
- 8th Delhi Legislative Assembly
- Incumbent Om Prakash Sharma
- Party: Bharatiya Janata Party
- Elected year: 2025

Vishwas Nagar Assembly constituency is a Delhi Legislative Assembly constituency, which is situated in Shahdara. Vishwas Nagar, Shahdara is a locality in North East Delhi.

== Members of the Legislative Assembly ==
Election	Name	Party
1993	Madan Lal Gaba	Bharatiya Janata Party
1998	Naseeb Singh	Indian National Congress
2003	Naseeb Singh	Indian National Congress
2008	Naseeb Singh	Indian National Congress
2013	Om Prakash Sharma	Bharatiya Janata Party
2015	Om Prakash Sharma	Bharatiya Janata Party
2020	Om Prakash Sharma	Bharatiya Janata Party
2025	Om Prakash Sharma	Bharatiya Janata Party

== Election results ==
=== 2025 ===
Delhi Assembly elections, 2025: Vishwas Nagar
Party	Candidate	Votes	%	±%
BJP	Om Prakash Sharma	72,141	57.7	▲5.13
AAP	Deepak Singla	47,099	37.67	▼1.75
INC	Rajiv Chaudhary	3,627	2.9	▼3.39
NOTA	None of the above	1,047	0.84	▲0.16
Majority		25,042		
Turnout				
BJP hold		Swing		

=== 2020 ===
Delhi Assembly elections, 2020: Vishwas Nagar
Party	Candidate	Votes	%	±%
BJP	Om Prakash Sharma	65,830	52.57	▲7.42
AAP	Deepak Singla	49,373	39.42	▲2.16
INC	Gurcharan Singh Raju	7,881	6.29	▼9.74
NOTA	None of the above	854	0.68	▲0.29
BSP	Dileep Gautam	739	0.59	▼0.07
Majority		16,457	13.15	▲5.26
Turnout		1,25,335	62.65	▼6.31
BJP hold		Swing	+7.42	

=== 2015 ===
Delhi Assembly elections, 2015: Vishwas Nagar
Party	Candidate	Votes	%	±%
BJP	Om Prakash Sharma	58,124	45.15	+7.15
AAP	Dr Atul Gupta	47,966	37.26	+11.49
INC	Naseeb Singh	20,634	16.03	−15.35
BSP	Girish Choudhary	854	0.66	−0.76
NOTA	None	499	0.39	−0.11
Majority		10,158	7.89	+1.28
Turnout		1,28,869	68.96	
BJP hold		Swing	+7.16	

=== 2013 ===
Delhi Assembly elections, 2013: Vishwas Nagar
Party	Candidate	Votes	%	±%
BJP	Om Prakash Sharma	44,801	38.00	−3.01
INC	Naseeb Singh	37,002	31.38	−19.71
AAP	Dr Atul Gupta	30,388	25.77	
Independent	Usha Suryan	3,221	2.73	
BSP	Sudesh Kumar Jain	1,652	1.40	−4.70
Independent	Shaukat Ali	166	0.14	
Independent	Vijay Kumar Sharma	87	0.07	
NOTA	None	591	0.50	
Majority		7,799	6.61	−3.47
Turnout		117,999	67.09	
BJP gain from INC		Swing	-3.01	

=== 2008 ===
Delhi Assembly elections, 2008: Vishwas Nagar
Party	Candidate	Votes	%	±%
INC	Naseeb Singh	48,805	51.09	−10.46
BJP	Om Prakash Sharma	39,176	41.01	+7.09
BSP	Narendra Kumar Pandey	5,823	6.10	+2.51
DBP	Deepak Gupta	528	0.55	
Independent	Sudesh Kumar Jain	350	0.37	
Independent	Ram Kumar	172	0.18	
Independent	Kamar Ahmad	144	0.15	
Independent	Ram Singh	143	0.15	
Independent	Mohd Shah	92	0.10	
RSSHP	Sanjay Sharma	89	0.09	
SS	Mahender Kumar Verma Advocate	86	0.09	
Independent	Brahmjit	68	0.07	
Independent	Girjesh Bahadur Singh	51	0.05	
Majority		9,629	10.08	−17.55
Turnout		95,527	58.7	−5.68
INC hold		Swing	-10.46	

=== 2003 ===
Delhi Assembly elections, 2003: Vishwas Nagar
Party	Candidate	Votes	%	±%
INC	Naseeb Singh	48,897	61.55	+13.37
BJP	Madan Lal Gaba	26,948	33.92	−13.53
BSP	Rakesh Tyagi	2,852	3.59	+1.21
Independent	Vijay Sharma	265	0.33	
Independent	Ramesh Kumar	101	0.13	+0.09
ABHM	Narendra Kumar Agarwal	97	0.12	−0.01
IJP	Mangal Singh	88	0.11	
SP	Nasruddin	86	0.11	
Independent	Amar Chand Jain	56	0.07	
BRP	Virender Kushwaha	53	0.07	
Majority		21,949	27.63	+26.90
Turnout		79,443	53.02	+7.63
INC hold		Swing	+13.37	

=== 1998 ===
Delhi Assembly elections, 1998: Vishwas Nagar
Party	Candidate	Votes	%	±%
INC	Naseeb Singh	30,380	48.18	+9.65
BJP	Dr Ved Vyas Mahajan	29,924	47.45	−3.02
BSP	Narender Kumar	1,500	2.38	+1.52
Independent	Surinder Kumar	621	0.98	
Independent	Jai Chand	159	0.25	
RPI	J P Sugan	157	0.25	
BKD(J)	Mahmood Khan	86	0.14	+0.04
ABHM	Rajan Moudgil	81	0.13	
IC(S)	Ajay	73	0.12	
AIRKC	Satish Garg	56	0.09	
Independent	Ramesh Kumar	23	0.04	
Majority		456	0.73	−11.21
Turnout		63,060	45.39	−20.14
INC gain from BJP		Swing	-9.65	

=== 1993 ===
Delhi Assembly elections, 1993: Vishwas Nagar
Party	Candidate	Votes	%	±%
BJP	Madan Lal Gaba	27,711	50.47	
INC	Abjit Singh Gulati	21,151	38.53	
JD	Ram Singh Thekedar	4,519	8.23	
BSP	Kamal Jeet	471	0.86	
DBP	Surinder Kumar Ralli	451	0.82	
Independent	Om Prakash	105	0.19	
Independent	Braham Jeet	81	0.15	
Doordarshi Party	Daulat Ram	67	0.12	
Independent	Jitender Kumar	67	0.12	
BKD(J)	Ajab Singh Bagri	53	0.10	
RMEP	Sant Tara Singh	46	0.08	
Independent	Prakash Bisht	38	0.07	
Independent	Vinod Kumar Bansal	28	0.05	
Independent	Manjeet Singh	25	0.05	
SP	Sunil Mehta	24	0.04	
PRC	Kishori Lal	21	0.04	
Independent	Ram Kumar	19	0.03	
Independent	Satish Chand	18	0.03	
Independent	Gurmeet Singh	6	0.01	
Majority		6,560	11.94	
Turnout		54,901	65.53	
BJP hold		Swing		
