= Surender Pal Ratawal =

Indian politician

Member of Delhi Legislative Assembly
- In office 1993–1998
- Constituency: Karol Bagh

Minister for Social Welfare and Tourism, Government of Delhi
- In office 1993–1998

Personal details
- Born: October 2, 1948 Delhi, India
- Party: Bharatiya Janata Party
- Known for: Three-time MLA from Karol Bagh; BJP leader in Delhi

Surender Pal Ratawal (born 2 October 1948) is an Indian politician and Bharatiya Janata Party leader from Delhi. He was thrice elected to Delhi Legislative Assembly from Karol Bagh (1993, 2003 and 2008). He also served as the Minister for Social Welfare and Minister for Tourism in the Government of Delhi from 1993 to 1998. He was the only NDA candidate who lost in the 1998 Indian general election in Delhi.
