= Rohini Assembly constituency =

Constituency of the Delhi legislative assembly in India

Coordinates: 28.741°N 77.090°E

Rohini
- Constituency No. 13 for the Delhi Legislative Assembly

Constituency details
- Country: India
- Region: North India
- State: Delhi
- District: North West Delhi
- Reservation: None

Member of Legislative Assembly
- 8th Delhi Legislative Assembly
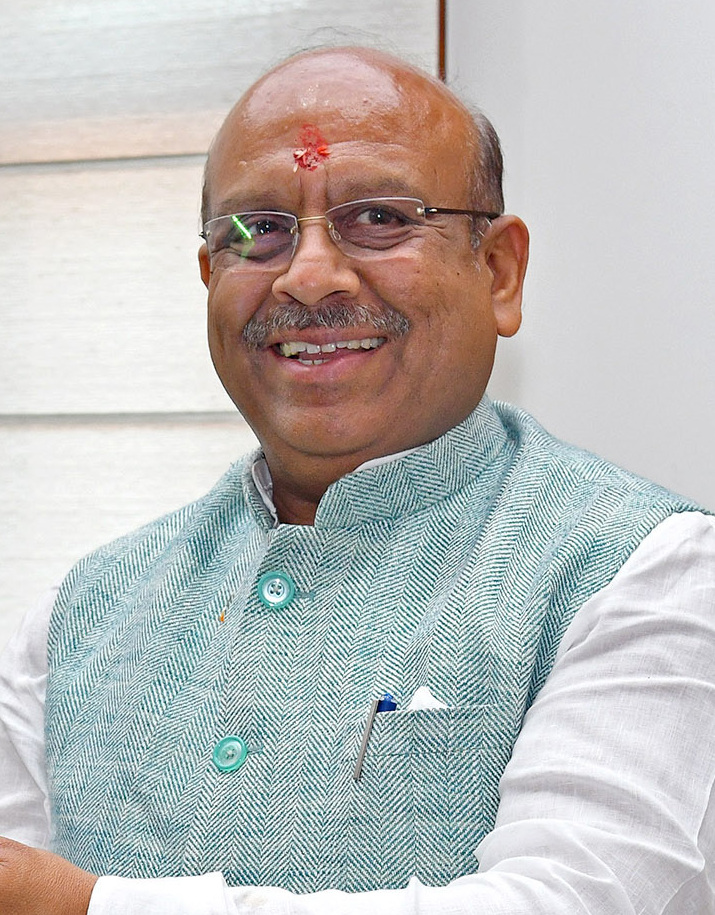
- Incumbent Vijender Gupta
- Party: BJP
- Elected year: 2025

Rohini Assembly constituency is one of the seventy Delhi assembly constituencies of Delhi in northern India. Rohini assembly constituency is a part of North West Delhi (Lok Sabha constituency). This constituency was created by reorganization by Delimitation Commission of India in 2008.

== Members of the Legislative Assembly ==
Year	Member	Party
2008	Jai Bhagwan Aggarwal	Bharatiya Janata Party
2013	Rajesh Garg	Aam Aadmi Party
2015	Vijender Gupta	Bharatiya Janata Party
2020	Vijender Gupta	Bharatiya Janata Party
2025	Vijender Gupta	Bharatiya Janata Party

== Election results ==
=== 2025 ===
Delhi Assembly elections, 2025
Party	Candidate	Votes	%	±%
BJP	Vijender Gupta	70,365	65.01	▲11.34
AAP	Pradeep Mittal	32,549	30.07	▼12.68
INC	Sumesh Gupta	3,765	3.48	▲1.79
NOTA	None of the above	1,031	0.60	
Majority		37,816	35.3	▲24.38
Turnout		1,07,202	62.5	▼0.81
BJP hold		Swing		

=== 2020 ===
Delhi Assembly elections, 2020: Rohini
Party	Candidate	Votes	%	±%
BJP	Vijender Gupta	62,174	53.67	+3.84
AAP	Rajesh Nama 'Bansiwala'	49,526	42.75	−2.61
INC	Sumesh Gupta	1,963	1.69	−1.14
Independent	Rajesh Garg	977	0.84	N/A
NOTA	None of the Above	782	0.68	+0.22
Majority		12,648	10.92	+6.45
Turnout		1,15,907	63.31	−5.46
BJP hold		Swing	+3.84	

=== 2015 ===
Delhi Assembly elections, 2015: Rohini
Party	Candidate	Votes	%	±%
BJP	Vijender Gupta	59,867	49.83	+7.99
AAP	C. L. Gupta	54,500	45.36	+1.82
INC	Sukhbir Sharma	3,399	2.83	−9.86
DMKP	Raju	1,406	1.17	
BSP	Deepak Kumar	349	0.29	−0.65
Independent	Sarabjit Singh	66	0.05	
NOTA	None of the Above	557	0.46	−0.30
Majority		5,367	4.47	+2.77
Turnout		1,20,271	68.86	+0.93
BJP gain from AAP		Swing	+7.99	

=== 2013 ===
Delhi Assembly elections, 2013: Rohini
Party	Candidate	Votes	%	±%
AAP	Rajesh Garg	47,890	43.54	N/A
BJP	Jai Bhagwan Aggarwal	46,018	41.84	−20.72
INC	K. K. Wadhwa	13,954	12.69	−20.97
BSP	Arun Kumar Chadha	1,039	0.94	−1.63
Independent	Rahul Kumar	241	0.22	N/A
NOTA	None of the Above	838	0.76	N/A
Majority		1,872	1.70	−27.20
Turnout		1,10,346	68.15	
AAP gain from BJP		Swing		

=== 2008 ===
Delhi Assembly elections, 2008: Rohini
Party	Candidate	Votes	%	±%
BJP	Jai Bhagwan Aggarwal	56,793	62.56	
INC	Vijender Jindal	30,019	33.66	
BSP	O P Malhotra	2,293	2.57	
Independent	Labhu Ram Garg	402	0.45	
SS	Jhankar Priye Chaturvedi	332	0.37	
BJSH	Sanjay Singh	243	0.27	
Independent	Naresh Kumar Goyal	107	0.12	
Majority		25,774	28.90	
Turnout		89,189	58.7	
BJP win (new seat)				
