= Vijender Gupta =

7th Speaker of Delhi Legislative Assembly since 2025

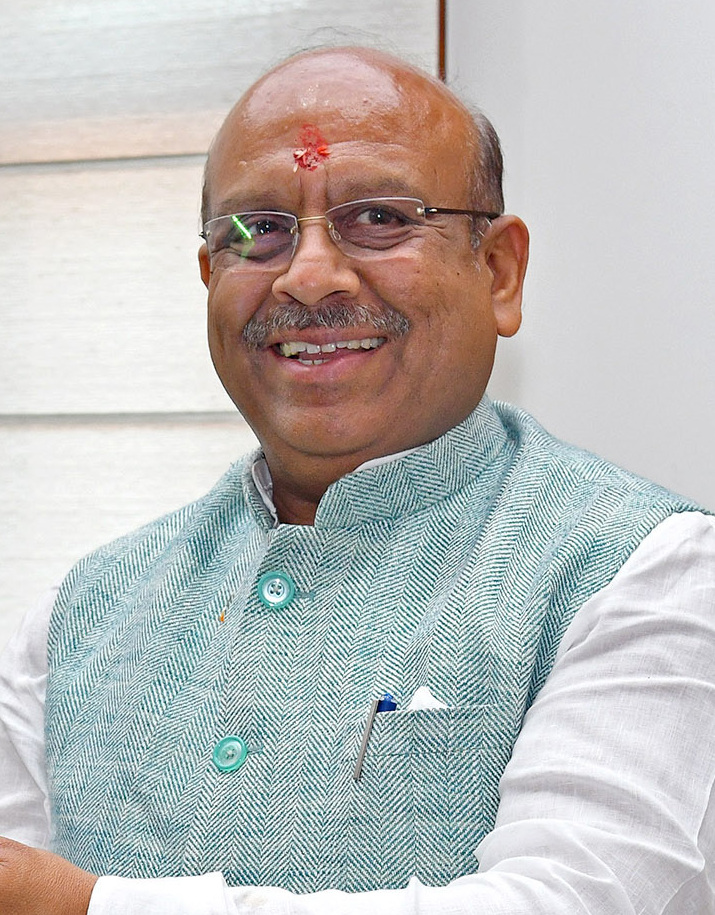
- Gupta in 2025

8th Speaker of the Delhi Legislative Assembly
- Incumbent
- Assumed office 20 February 2025
- Lieutenant Governor: Vinai Kumar Saxena
- Deputy: Mohan Singh Bisht
- Preceded by: Ram Niwas Goel

Leader of the Opposition in Delhi Legislative Assembly
- In office 5 August 2024 – 8 February 2025
- Preceded by: Ramvir Singh Bidhuri
- Succeeded by: Atishi Marlena
- In office 16 April 2015 – 11 February 2020
- Preceded by: Harsh Vardhan
- Succeeded by: Ramvir Singh Bidhuri

Member of Delhi Legislative Assembly
- Incumbent
- Assumed office 10 February 2015
- Preceded by: Rajesh Garg
- Constituency: Rohini

President of Bharatiya Janata Party, Delhi
- In office 15 May 2010 – 16 February 2013
- Preceded by: Om Prakash Kohli
- Succeeded by: Vijay Goel

Personal details
- Born: 14 August 1963 (age 62) Delhi, India
- Party: Bharatiya Janata Party (since 1980)
- Spouse: Shobha Gupta (m. 1987)
- Children: 2
- Profession: Politician

Vijender Gupta (born 14 August 1963) is an Indian politician of BJP party from Delhi. He is currently 7th speaker of Delhi Legislative Assembly since 2025. He holds the position of Member of Legislative Assembly from Rohini constituency and also a member of BJP's National Executive. In Delhi state elections 2015, he was one of the three BJP candidates to win and was also the president of Delhi state unit of BJP.

== Personal life ==
Gupta married Dr. Shobha Vijender, who founded a pioneering NGO named "SAMPURNA" on 1 November 1987.

== Political career ==
An alumnus of Shri Ram College of Commerce and a three time councillor and now three time MLA from Rohini, Gupta is a former vice president of Delhi University Students Union.

He started his political career as secretary of Janta Vidyarthi Morcha in 1980. He was quickly elevated to Joint Convener of Janta Vidyarthi Morcha in 1983. In 1995 he was appointed President of Bhartiya Janta Yuva Morcha in Keshav Puram District.

His electoral journey started in 1997 when he was elected as Councilor of Municipal Corporation of Delhi. He served as Chairman of Law & General Purpose Committee, Municipal Corporation of Delhi from 1997 to 1998 and Deputy Chairman of High Powered House Tax Committee from 2001 to 2002. He has been elected three times in the Municipal elections from Rohini that too with the highest margin in Delhi. To his credit, Gupta developed Rohini as a model municipal unit.

He was elevated to Secretary of BJP Delhi in 2002. Gupta had also contested the 2009 Lok Sabha election from the Chandni Chowk constituency against Kapil Sibal of the Congress but lost. Gupta was nominated BJP Delhi president on 15 May 2010. He contested the 2013 Delhi Legislative Assembly election from New Delhi but lost to Arvind Kejriwal.

In Delhi state elections 2015, he contested again from Rohini and won. He was one of the three BJP candidates to pull a win. Vijender Gupta was appointed the leader of opposition (LoP) in the Delhi assembly on 16 April 2015.

He defeated Aam Aadmi Party Candidate of Rohini Rajesh Nama 'Bansiwala' in 2020 Delhi Legislative Assembly election by a margin of more than 12,000 votes.

In 2025 Delhi Legislative Assembly election, he won his seat again with a margin of more than 37000 votes, highest among all 48 BJP candidates who had won the election.

On Feb 20, he was elected as speaker of Delhi Legislative Assembly.

State Legislative Assembly
Preceded by ?	Member of the Delhi Legislative Assembly from Rohini Assembly constituency 2020–	Incumbent
