= Wazirpur Assembly constituency =

Constituency of the Delhi legislative assembly in India

Coordinates: 28.698°N 77.163°E

Wazirpur
- Constituency No. 17 for the Delhi Legislative Assembly

Constituency details
- Country: India
- Region: North India
- State: Delhi
- District: Chandni Chowk
- Established: 1993
- Reservation: None

Member of Legislative Assembly
- 8th Delhi Legislative Assembly
- Incumbent Poonam Sharma
- Party: Bharatiya Janata Party
- Elected year: 2025

Wazirpur Assembly constituency is one of the seventy Delhi assembly constituencies of Delhi in northern India. Wazirpur assembly constituency is a part of Chandni Chowk (Lok Sabha constituency).

== Members of the Legislative Assembly ==
Year	Name	Party
1993	Deep Chand Bandhu	Indian National Congress
1998	Deep Chand Bandhu	Indian National Congress
2003	Mange Ram Garg	Bharatiya Janata Party
2008	Hari Shankar Gupta	Indian National Congress
2013	Mahander Nagpal	Bharatiya Janata Party
2015	Rajesh Gupta	Aam Aadmi Party
2020	Rajesh Gupta	Aam Aadmi Party
2025	Poonam Sharma	Bharatiya Janata Party

== Election results ==
=== 2025 ===
Delhi Assembly elections, 2025: Wazirpur
Party	Candidate	Votes	%	±%
BJP	Poonam Sharma	54,721	51.24	▲9.33
AAP	Rajesh Gupta	43,296	40.54	▼12.1
INC	Ragini Nayak	6,348	5.94	▲2.73
NOTA	None of the above	652	0.61	
Majority		11,425	10.70	▼0.03
Turnout		1,06,136	55.9	▼4.6
BJP gain from AAP		Swing		

=== 2020 ===
Delhi Assembly elections, 2020: Wazirpur
Party	Candidate	Votes	%	±%
AAP	Rajesh Gupta	57,331	52.64	−2.21
BJP	Mahander Nagpal	45,641	41.91	+6.81
INC	Harikishan Jindal	3,501	3.21	−4.29
BSP	Mustqim Ahmed	889	0.82	−0.24
NOTA	None of the above	477	0.44	+0.02
Majority		11,690	10.73	−9.02
Turnout		1,09,654	60.50	−7.92
AAP hold		Swing	-2.21	

=== 2015 ===
Delhi Assembly elections, 2015: Wazirpur
Party	Candidate	Votes	%	±%
AAP	Rajesh Gupta	61,208	54.85	+24.01
BJP	Mahander Nagpal	39,164	35.10	−1.15
INC	Hari Shankar Gupta	8,371	7.50	−16.55
BSP	Ram Dhani	1,185	1.06	−1.20
Independent	Rajesh Kumar	547	0.49	
NOTA	None	468	0.42	−0.23
Majority		22,044	19.76	+14.34
Turnout		1,11,591	68.42	
AAP gain from BJP		Swing		

=== 2013 ===
Delhi Assembly elections, 2013: Wazirpur
Party	Candidate	Votes	%	±%
BJP	Mahander Nagpal	37,306	36.25	−5.28
AAP	Praveen Kumar (actor)	31,732	30.84	
INC	Hari Shanker Gupta	24,750	24.05	−21.02
Independent	Gagan	3,609	3.51	
BSP	Pramod Sachdeva	2,323	2.26	−8.11
Independent	Subhash C Saini	1,008	0.98	
DMDK	Ishvari	362	0.35	
Independent	Sunil Kumar	314	0.31	
SP	H D Ansari	228	0.22	
CPI(ML)L	Mannu Kumar @ Munna Yadav	172	0.17	
BJD(I)	Bihari Lal	162	0.16	
Independent	Karey Singh	150	0.15	
RBHP	Raj Kumari	128	0.12	
NOTA	None of the Above	665	0.65	
Majority		5,574	5.42	
Turnout		102,986	67.05	+10.36
BJP gain from INC		Swing		

=== 2008 ===
Delhi Assembly elections, 2008: Wazirpur
Party	Candidate	Votes	%	±%
INC	Hari Shanker Gupta	39,977	45.07	+3.98
BJP	Mange Ram Garg	36,837	41.53	−3.76
BSP	Janesh Kumar Bhadana	9,199	10.37	+0.38
RJD	Inderjeet Yadav	860	0.97	
Independent	Sunil Kumar	668	0.75	
Independent	Ram Avadh	437	0.49	
Independent	Yogesh	183	0.21	
Independent	Yoginder	170	0.19	
Independent	Ravi Jain	151	0.17	
Independent	Munna Ram	130	0.15	
Independent	Dharam Pal	95	0.11	
Majority		3,140	3.54	
Turnout		88,707	56.69	−2.42
INC gain from BJP		Swing		

=== 2003 ===
Delhi Assembly elections, 2003: Wazirpur
Party	Candidate	Votes	%	±%
BJP	Mange Ram Garg	27,052	45.29	+10.26
INC	Rattan Chand Jain	24,545	41.09	−18.60
BKRP	Kalpu Ram	325	0.54	
NCP	Adarsh Bhalla	242	0.41	
Independent	Satya Pal Singh	208	0.35	
Independent	Padam Chand Patni (Jain)	162	0.27	
Independent	Bishan Lal	158	0.26	
RSP(U)	Pradeep Kumar	150	0.25	
Independent	Satyanarayan Bansal	136	0.23	
Independent	Mohan Lal	134	0.22	
Independent	Asha Singh	121	0.20	
JP	Kunji Lal Sonkar	105	0.18	
Independent	Jitender Pal	82	0.14	
Independent	Yogesh	71	0.12	
JPJD	Manish Sharma	64	0.11	
SP	Keshair Jahan	60	0.10	
IJP	Devinder Kumar	57	0.10	
JKNPP	Rafakat Ali Khan	51	0.09	
RMEP	Manoj Kumar	42	0.07	
Majority		2,507	4.20	
Turnout		59,730	59.11	+4.64
BJP gain from INC		Swing		

=== 1998 ===
Delhi Assembly elections, 1998: Wazirpur
Party	Candidate	Votes	%	±%
INC	Deep Chand Bandhu	36,010	59.69	+16.56
BJP	Shyam Lal Garg	21,132	35.03	−7.31
BSP	Rajender Prasad	1,450	2.40	+1.11
JD	Umesh Khari	1,413	2.34	
Independent	Chhimma Prasad	140	0.23	
RJD	Surender Kumar (Sajan)	54	0.09	
Independent	Brij Mohan Sharma	47	0.08	
Independent	Gyan Tyagi	44	0.07	
Independent	Sandeep Singh	32	0.05	
Independent	Uttam Kumar	9	0.01	
Majority		14,878	24.66	
Turnout		60,331	54.48	−13.37
INC hold		Swing		

=== 1993 ===
Delhi Assembly elections, 1993: Wazirpur
Party	Candidate	Votes	%	±%
INC	Deep Chand Bandhu	26,150	43.13	
BJP	Mange Ram Garg	25,671	42.34	
JD	Umesh Khari	7,176	11.84	
BSP	Phool Chand Yada	780	1.29	
Independent	Rajendra Prasad	254	0.42	
DPP	Rajender	198	0.33	
SOP(RP)	Arvind Kumar	104	0.17	
Independent	Mukesh	82	0.14	
Independent	Ashwini Kumar	45	0.07	
Independent	Adishwar Jain	37	0.06	
Independent	Brij Mohan	36	0.06	
SP	Shankar Sharma	33	0.05	
Independent	Jagdev	33	0.05	
Independent	Desh Deepak Suri	31	0.05	
Majority		479	0.79	
Turnout		60,630	67.85	
INC win (new seat)				
