= Om Prakash Sharma (Delhi politician) =

Indian politician (born 1953)

Member, Delhi Legislative Assembly
- Incumbent
- Assumed office 8 December 2013
- Preceded by: Naseeb Singh
- Constituency: Vishwas Nagar

Personal details
- Born: 20 March 1953 (age 72); Delhi, India
- Political party: Bharatiya Janata Party
- Spouse: Geeta Sharma
- Parent: Sh. Shiv Lal Sharma (father)
- Education: Delhi University (BA)

Om Prakash Sharma (born 20 March 1953) is an Indian politician and MLA from Vishwas Nagar in Delhi. He served as the deputy leader of opposition of Delhi from 2020 to 2025.

Generally known as O.P. Sharma, he is a leader of the Bharatiya Janata Party and a member of the Delhi Legislative Assembly. He was one of three BJP MLAs elected in the 2015 Delhi Legislative Assembly election. He was the only BJP MLA who was able to retain his seat from 2013 Election from Vishwasnagar constituency beating his nearest candidate, Naseeb Singh (INC), by 7,000 votes.

He was born in the staff quarters of corporation employees at Kashmere Gate. Sharma's father was working in the Municipal Corporation of Delhi. The eldest of three sons, Sharma graduated from Satyawati College where he was college president. He also contested the Delhi University students’ union election and was an executive member of the team which Arun Jaitley headed as president. He started his political career from Delhi University. Then he worked as an employee of the municipal corporation. After his father died, he became an inspector in the house tax department. He quit the job within a year and started taking care of sweets shops his family owns. Now he is well known Politician in Bharatiya Janata Party, Delhi.

== Controversies and legal cases ==
In the year of 2016, OP Sharma was suspended from 2 sessions due to his use of certain derogatory remarks against AAP's Chandni Chowk MLA Alka Lamba. He was also arrested following an attack on a CPI leader and journalists outside Patiala House Courts where Kanhaiya Kumar the former JNUSU president was being produced.

On 9 January 2017, Sharma's office in Karkarduma in east Delhi was burgled, days after Deputy Chief Minister Manish Sisodia's office located around the same area was broken into. A computer, LCD TV, DVRs from CCTV cameras, and files were stolen from Sharma's office, the same items that were stolen in the Sisodia burglary.

== Electoral performance ==
Delhi Assembly elections, 2020: Vishwas Nagar
Party	Candidate	Votes	%	±%
BJP	Om Prakash Sharma	65,830	52.57	▲7.42
AAP	Deepak Singla	49,373	39.42	▲2.16
INC	Gurcharan Singh Raju	7,881	6.29	▼9.74
NOTA	None of the above	854	0.68	▲0.29
BSP	Dileep Gautam	739	0.59	▼0.07
Majority		16,457	13.15	▲5.26
Turnout		1,25,335	62.65	▼6.31
BJP hold		Swing	+7.42	

State Legislative Assembly
Preceded by ?	Member of the Delhi Legislative Assembly from Vishwas Nagar Assembly constituency 2020–	Incumbent
