= Dwarka (disambiguation) =

Dwarka, Dwaraka or Dvaraka may refer to:

== Places ==
=== India ===
- Dvārakā, also Dvaravati, ancient city in Gujarat, the capital of the Yadus in the Mahabharata

- Dvārakā–Kamboja route, an ancient trade-route and a branch of the Silk Road
- Dvaravati sila, sacred coral stone (shaligrama) from the Gomti river in Dwarka

- Dwarka, Gujarat, also known as Dvaraka

- Dwarka, Gujarat Assembly constituency, an assembly constituency of Gujarat
- Dwarkadhish Temple, a Hindu temple dedicated to the god Krishna
- Dwarka Sharada Peetham, a monastery in Gujarat

- Devbhumi Dwarka district, a district of Gujarat
- Dwarka River, a tributary of the Bhagirathi
- Bet Dwarka, an island near the city of Dvaraka (Gujarat)
- Dwarka, Delhi, Sub City of Delhi, also known as Dvaraka

- Dwarka, Delhi Assembly constituency, an assembly constituency of Delhi
- Dwarka Baoli, a stepwell in Delhi

- Dwaraka Nagar, a locality in Visakhapatnam

- Dwaraka Nagar, Kadapa, a village in Andhra Pradesh

- Dwaraka Tirumala, a town in Andhra Pradesh

- Dwaraka Tirumala mandal, a tehsil in Andhra Pradesh
- Venkateswara Temple, Dwaraka Tirumala, a vaishnavite temple

=== Other ===
- Derweze, Turkmenistan, also known as Dvaraka
- Dvaravati, also known as Dvaraka, a kingdom of the Mon people from the 7th to 11th-centuries in what is now central Thailand

- Dvaravati art

== Transport ==
=== Delhi Metro ===
- Dwarka metro station
- Dwarka Mor metro station
- Dwarka Sector 8 metro station
- Dwarka Sector 9 metro station
- Dwarka Sector 10 metro station
- Dwarka Sector 11 metro station
- Dwarka Sector 12 metro station
- Dwarka Sector 13 metro station
- Dwarka Sector 14 metro station
- Dwarka Sector 21 metro station
- Yashobhoomi Dwarka Sector - 25 metro station

=== Other ===
- Dwarka Express, an express train of the Indian Railways
- Dwarka Expressway, expressway between Dwarka, Delhi and Haryana in India
- Puri Okha Dwarka Express, an express train of the Indian Railways
- Dwarka railway station, a railway station in Gujarat, India
- Dwaraka bus station, a bus station complex in Visakhapatnam, India
- Jamnagar & Dwaraka Railway, metre gauge railway in Gujarat during 19th century
- MV Dwarka, a passenger/cargo ship of British India Steam Navigation Company

== People ==
- Dwarka Divecha, an Indian cinematographer and actor
- Dwarka Nath Das, an Indian politician from Assam
- Dwarka Nath Mitra, an Indian lawyer and judge of the Calcutta High Court
- Dwarka Nath Tiwary, an Indian politician from Bihar
- Dwarka Prasad Mishra, an Indian politician; chief minister of Madhya Pradesh
- Dwarkanath, an Indian male given name
  - Dwarkanath Kotnis, Indian physician during the Second Sino-Japanese War
  - Dwarkanath Tagore, Indian industrialist and founder of the Jorasanko branch of the Tagore family

== Entertainment ==
- Dwaraka (film), a 2017 Indian Telugu-language film

== Other uses ==
- Operation Dwarka, a naval operation by the Pakistan Navy during the Indo-Pakistani war of 1965
- INS Dwarka, a forward operating base of the Indian Navy
