= Indraprastha metro station =

Metro station in Delhi, India

Indraprastha

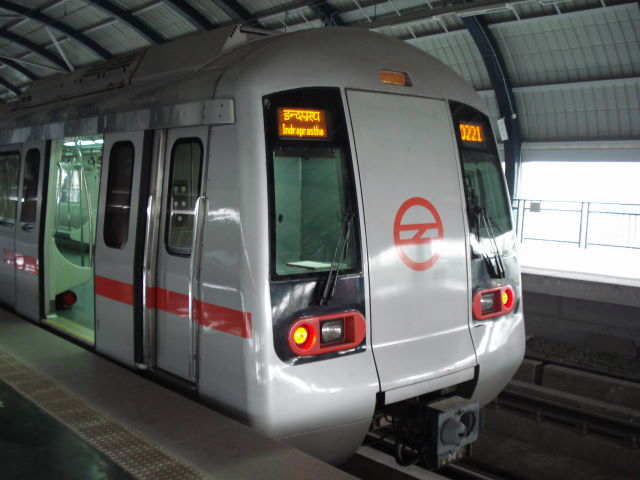
- Southbound Train at Indraprastha

General information
- Coordinates: 28°37′14″N 77°15′00″E
- System: Delhi Metro station
- Owner: Delhi Metro
- Line: Blue Line Magenta Line
- Platforms: Side platform; Platform-1 → Noida Electronic City / Vaishali; Platform-2 → Dwarka Sector 21
- Tracks: 2

Construction
- Structure type: Elevated
- Parking: Available
- Accessible: Yes

Other information
- Station code: IDPT

History
- Opened: 11 November 2006; 19 years ago
- Electrified: 25 kV 50 Hz AC through overhead catenary

Services
| Preceding station | Delhi Metro | Following station |
|---|---|---|
| Supreme Court towards Dwarka Sector 21 | Blue Line | Yamuna Bank towards Noida Electronic City or Vaishali |
Future Service
| Delhi Sachivalaya–I.G. Stadium towards Inderlok | Magenta Line | Bharat Mandapam towards Botanical Garden |
Route map
Location

The Indraprastha metro station is located on the Blue Line of the Delhi Metro.

== Station layout ==
| L2 | Side platform | Doors will open on the left |
| L2 | Platform 1 Eastbound | Towards → Noida Electronic City / Vaishali; Next Station: Yamuna Bank |
| L2 | Platform 2 Westbound | Towards ← Dwarka Sector 21; Next Station: Supreme Court |
| L2 | Side platform | Doors will open on the left |
| L1 | Concourse | Fare control, station agent, Metro Card vending machines, crossover |
| G | Street level | Exit/Entrance |

== Facilities ==
List of available ATM at Indraprastha metro station: State Bank of India, Canara Bank.

== See also ==
- List of Delhi Metro stations
- Transport in Delhi
