= Dwarka Sector 12 metro station =

Metro station in Delhi, India

Dwarka Sector 12 द्वारका सेक्टर 12

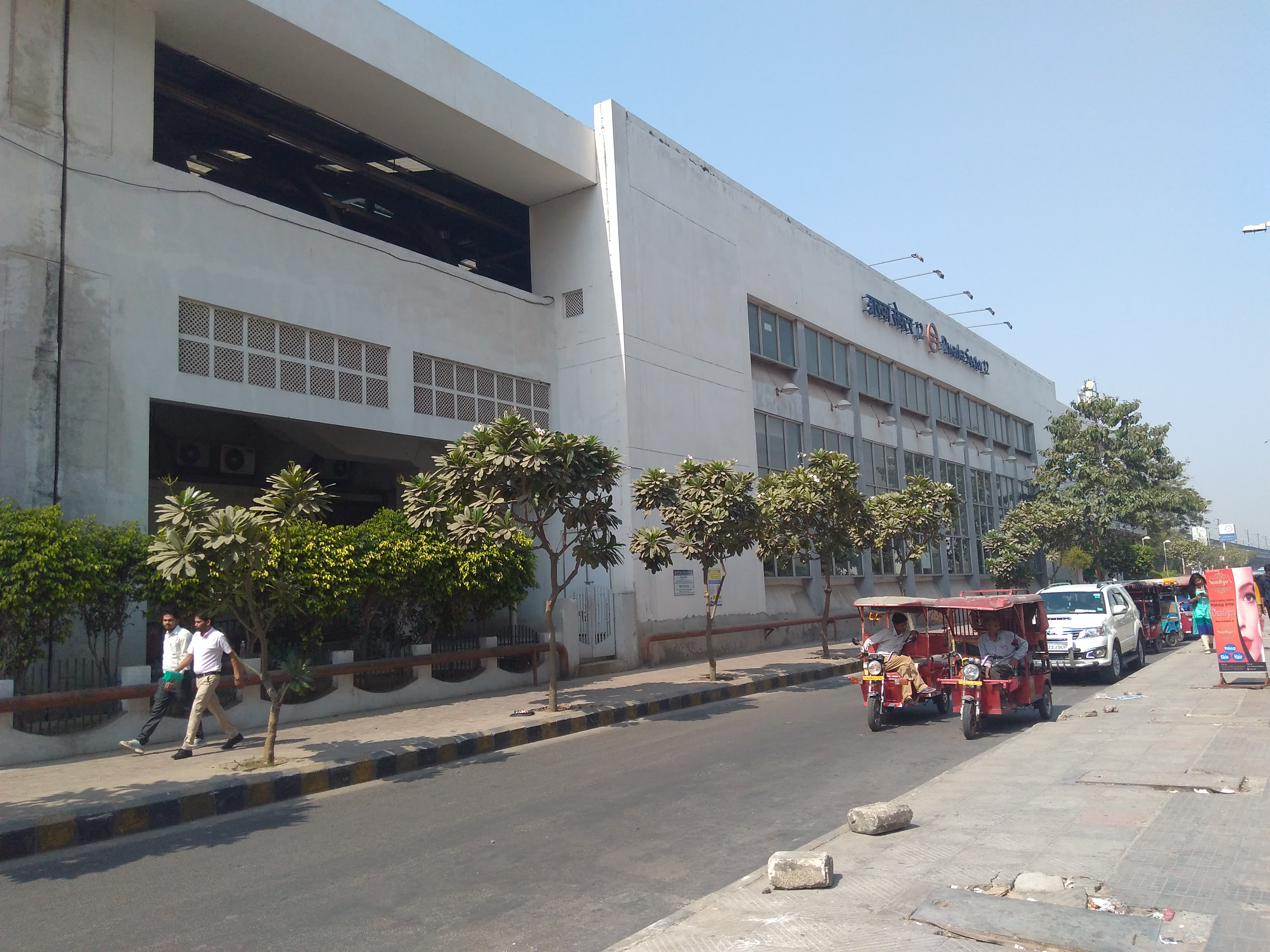

General information
- Location: Block B, Sector 12 Dwarka, New Delhi, 110078
- Coordinates: 28°35′32″N 77°02′26″E
- System: Delhi Metro station
- Owner: Delhi Metro
- Operator: Delhi Metro Rail Corporation (DMRC)
- Line: Blue Line
- Platforms: Side platform; Platform-1 → Noida Electronic City / Vaishali; Platform-2 → Dwarka Sector 21
- Tracks: 2

Construction
- Structure type: Elevated, Double-track
- Platform levels: 2
- Parking: Available
- Accessible: Yes

Other information
- Station code: DSW

History
- Opened: 1 April 2006; 20 years ago
- Electrified: 25 kV 50 Hz AC through overhead catenary

Passengers
- Jan 2015: 5,395/day 167,235/ Month average

Services
Preceding station	Delhi Metro	Following station
Dwarka Sector 11 towards Dwarka Sector 21	Blue Line	Dwarka Sector 13 towards Noida Electronic City or Vaishali
Route map
Location

The Dwarka Sector 12 metro station is located on the Blue Line of the Delhi Metro. It is the busiest metro station in Dwarka. Presence of several schools, banks, and business centres makes the metro station a centre of commute point. City Centre is located just in front of the metro station. E-rickshaw services are streamlined and easily available.

== The station ==
=== Station layout ===
L2	Side platform | Doors will open on the left
L2	Platform 1 Eastbound	Towards → Noida Electronic City / Vaishali; Next Station: Dwarka Sector 13
L2	Platform 2 Westbound	Towards ← Dwarka Sector 21; Next Station: Dwarka Sector 11
L2	Side platform | Doors will open on the left
L1	Concourse	Fare control, station agent, Metro Card vending machines, crossover
G	Street Level	Exit/Entrance

=== Facilities ===
ATM is available. An "ananda" dairy shop is also open. List of available ATM at Dwarka Sector 12 metro station Punjab National Bank, State Bank of India, Canara Bank.

== Entry/Exit ==
Dwarka Sector 12 metro station Entry/exits
Gate No-1	Gate No-2

== See also ==
- Delhi
- List of Delhi Metro stations
- Transport in Delhi
- Delhi Metro Rail Corporation
- Delhi Suburban Railway
- Delhi Monorail
- Delhi Transport Corporation
- West Delhi
- New Delhi
- Dwarka, Delhi
- National Capital Region (India)
- List of rapid transit systems
- List of metro systems
