= Dwarka Sector 11 metro station =

Metro station in Delhi, India

Dwarka Sector 11 द्वारका सेक्टर 11

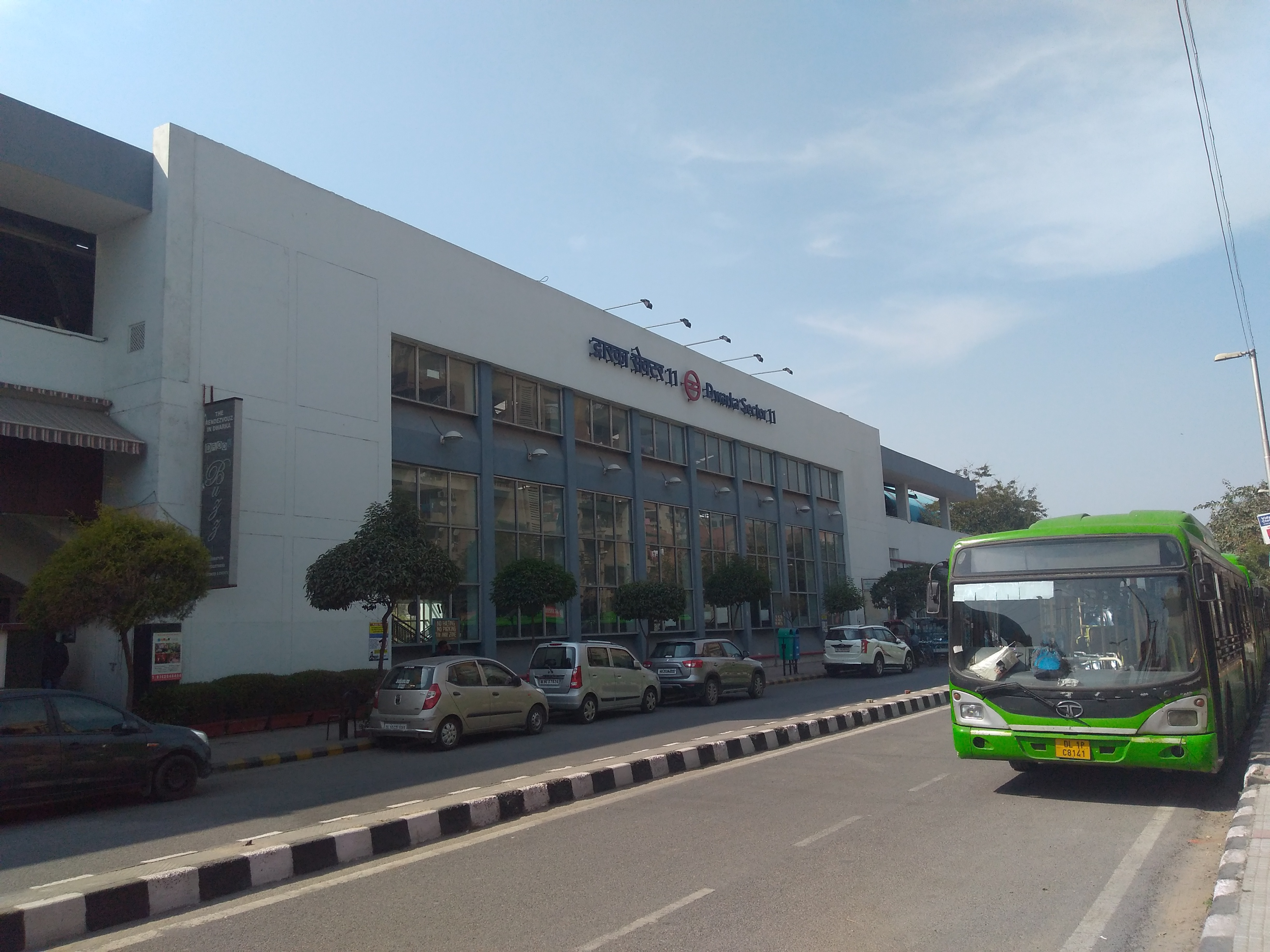

General information
- Location: Sector 11 Dwarka, New Delhi, 110075
- Coordinates: 28°35′11″N 77°02′58″E
- System: Delhi Metro station
- Owner: Delhi Metro
- Operator: Delhi Metro Rail Corporation (DMRC)
- Line: Blue Line
- Platforms: Side platform; Platform-1 → Noida Electronic City / Vaishali; Platform-2 → Dwarka Sector 21
- Tracks: 2

Construction
- Structure type: Elevated, Double-track
- Platform levels: 2
- Parking: Available
- Accessible: Yes

Other information
- Station code: DSE

History
- Opened: 1 April 2006; 20 years ago
- Electrified: 25 kV 50 Hz AC through overhead catenary

Passengers
- Jan 2015: 4,004/day 124,120/ Month average

Services
Preceding station	Delhi Metro	Following station
Dwarka Sector 10 towards Dwarka Sector 21	Blue Line	Dwarka Sector 12 towards Noida Electronic City or Vaishali
Route map
Location

The Dwarka Sector 11 metro station is located on the Blue Line of the Delhi Metro.

== The station ==
=== Station layout ===
L2	Side platform | Doors will open on the left
L2	Platform 1 Eastbound	Towards → Noida Electronic City / Vaishali; Next Station: Dwarka Sector 12
L2	Platform 2 Westbound	Towards ← Dwarka Sector 21; Next Station: Dwarka Sector 10
L2	Side platform | Doors will open on the left
L1	Concourse	Fare control, station agent, Metro Card vending machines, crossover
G	Street Level	Exit/Entrance

=== Facilities ===
List of available ATM at Dwarka Sector 11 metro station are Punjab National Bank, Canara Bank.

== Entry/Exit ==
Dwarka Sector 11 metro station Entry/exits
Gate No-1	Gate No-2

== Connections ==
=== Bus ===
Delhi Transport Corporation bus routes number 728, 770B, 833STL, RL-77A, RL-77EXT serves the station from Rajkiya Pratibha Vikas Vidyalay stop nearby.

== See also ==
- Delhi
- List of Delhi Metro stations
- Transport in Delhi
- Delhi Metro Rail Corporation
- Delhi Suburban Railway
- Delhi Monorail
- Delhi Transport Corporation
- West Delhi
- New Delhi
- Dwarka, Delhi
- National Capital Region (India)
- List of rapid transit systems
- List of metro systems
