= Dwarka Sector 9 metro station =

Metro station in Delhi, India

Dwarka Sector 9 द्वारका सेक्टर 9

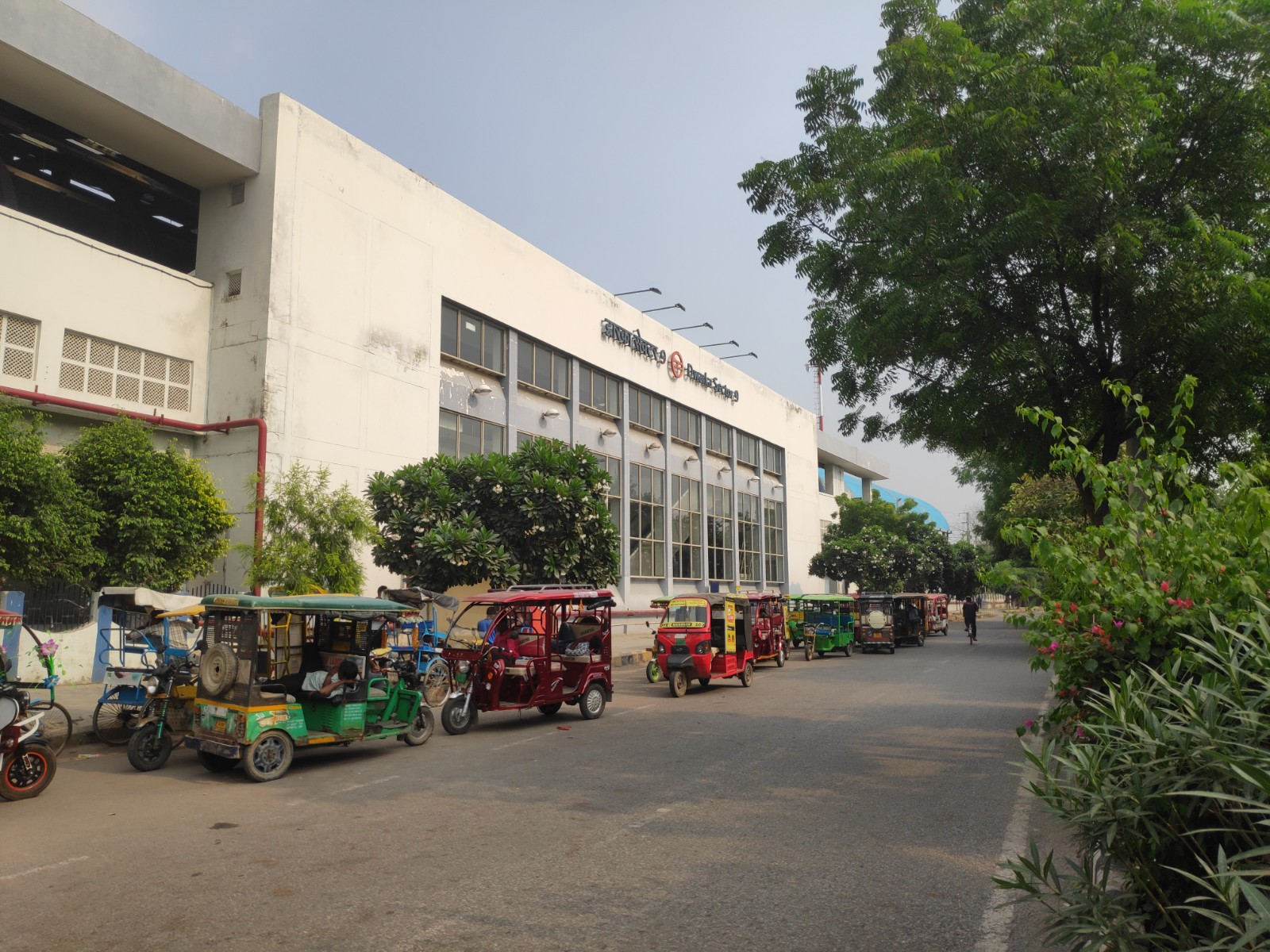

General information
- Location: Dwarka Sector 9, Dwarka, New Delhi, 110075
- Coordinates: 28°34′27″N 77°03′55″E
- System: Delhi Metro station
- Owner: Delhi Metro
- Operator: Delhi Metro Rail Corporation (DMRC)
- Line: Blue Line
- Platforms: Side platform; Platform-1 → Noida Electronic City / Vaishali; Platform-2 → Dwarka Sector 21
- Tracks: 2

Construction
- Structure type: Elevated
- Platform levels: 2
- Parking: Available
- Accessible: Yes

Other information
- Station code: DSN

History
- Opened: 1 April 2006; 20 years ago
- Electrified: 25 kV 50 Hz AC through overhead catenary

Passengers
- Jan 2015: 7,592/day 235,347/ Month average

Services
Preceding station	Delhi Metro	Following station
Dwarka Sector 8 towards Dwarka Sector 21	Blue Line	Dwarka Sector 10 towards Noida Electronic City or Vaishali
Route map
Location

The Dwarka Sector 9 metro station is located on the Blue Line of the Delhi Metro.

== The station ==
=== Station layout ===
L2	Side platform | Doors will open on the left
L2	Platform 1 Eastbound	Towards → Noida Electronic City / Vaishali; Next Station: Dwarka Sector 10
L2	Platform 2 Westbound	Towards ← Dwarka Sector 21; Next Station: Dwarka Sector 8
L2	Side platform | Doors will open on the left
L1	Concourse	Fare control, station agent, Metro Card vending machines, crossover
G	Street Level	Exit/Entrance

=== Facilities ===
List of available ATM at Dwarka Sector 9 metro station are Punjab National Bank, State Bank of India, IndusInd Bank.

== See also ==
- Delhi
- List of Delhi Metro stations
- Transport in Delhi
- Delhi Metro Rail Corporation
- Delhi Suburban Railway
- Delhi Monorail
- Delhi Transport Corporation
- West Delhi
- New Delhi
- Dwarka, Delhi
- National Capital Region (India)
- List of rapid transit systems
- List of metro systems
