= Dwarka Sector 14 metro station =

Metro station in Delhi, India

Dwarka Sector 14 द्वारका सेक्टर 14

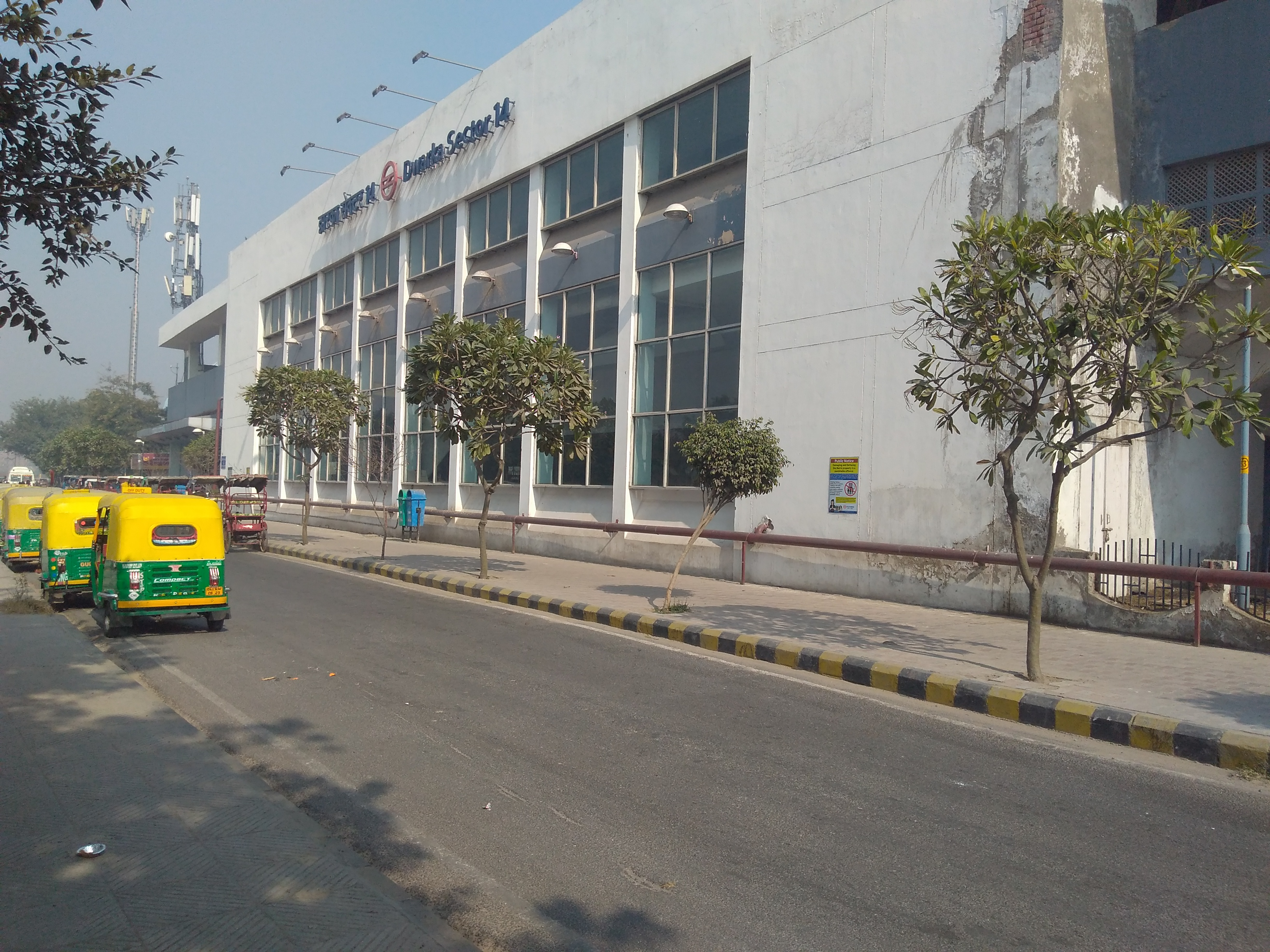

General information
- Location: Sector 14 Dwarka, New Delhi, 110078
- Coordinates: 28°36′08″N 77°01′34″E
- System: Delhi Metro station
- Owner: Delhi Metro
- Operator: Delhi Metro Rail Corporation (DMRC)
- Line: Blue Line
- Platforms: Side platform; Platform-1 → Noida Electronic City / Vaishali; Platform-2 → Dwarka Sector 21
- Tracks: 2

Construction
- Structure type: Elevated, Double-track
- Platform levels: 2
- Parking: Available
- Accessible: Yes

Other information
- Station code: DSFN

History
- Opened: 1 April 2006; 20 years ago
- Electrified: 25 kV 50 Hz AC through overhead catenary

Passengers
- Jan 2015: 5,871/day 182,010/ Month average

Services
Preceding station	Delhi Metro	Following station
Dwarka Sector 13 towards Dwarka Sector 21	Blue Line	Dwarka-Kakrola towards Noida Electronic City or Vaishali
Route map
Location

The Dwarka Sector 14 metro station is located on the Blue Line of the Delhi Metro. It is the nearest metro station to National Law University, Delhi one of the national law schools in India and Guru Gobind Singh Indraprastha University, NAAC 'A' accredited university established by Government of NCT of Delhi.

Nearest metro station to Kakrola village as well.

== The station ==
=== Station layout ===
L2	Side platform | Doors will open on the left
L2	Platform 1 Eastbound	Towards → Noida Electronic City / Vaishali; Next Station: Dwarka-Kakrola Change at the next station for Grey Line
L2	Platform 2 Westbound	Towards ← Dwarka Sector 21; Next Station: Dwarka Sector 13
L2	Side platform | Doors will open on the left
L1	Concourse	Fare control, station agent, Metro Card vending machines, crossover
G	Street Level	Exit/Entrance

=== Facilities ===
List of available ATM at Dwarka Sector 14 metro station: Canara Bank, Punjab National Bank.

== Entry/Exit ==
Dwarka Sector 14 metro station Entry/exits
Gate No-1	Gate No-2
Eros Metro Mall	Vegas Mall

== Connections ==
=== Bus ===
Delhi Transport Corporation bus routes number OLA120, RL-75 serves the station from outside metro station stop.

== Gallery ==
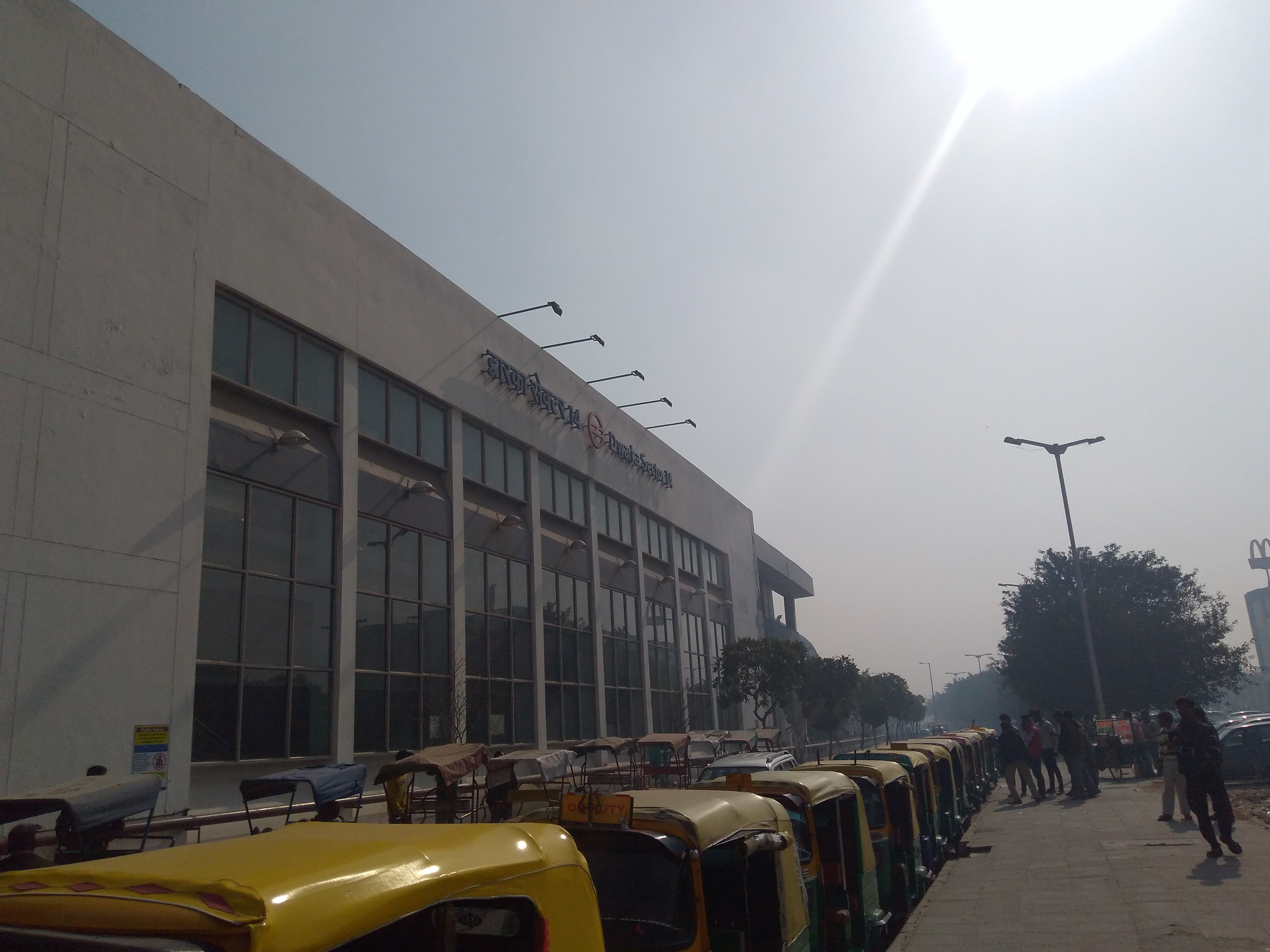

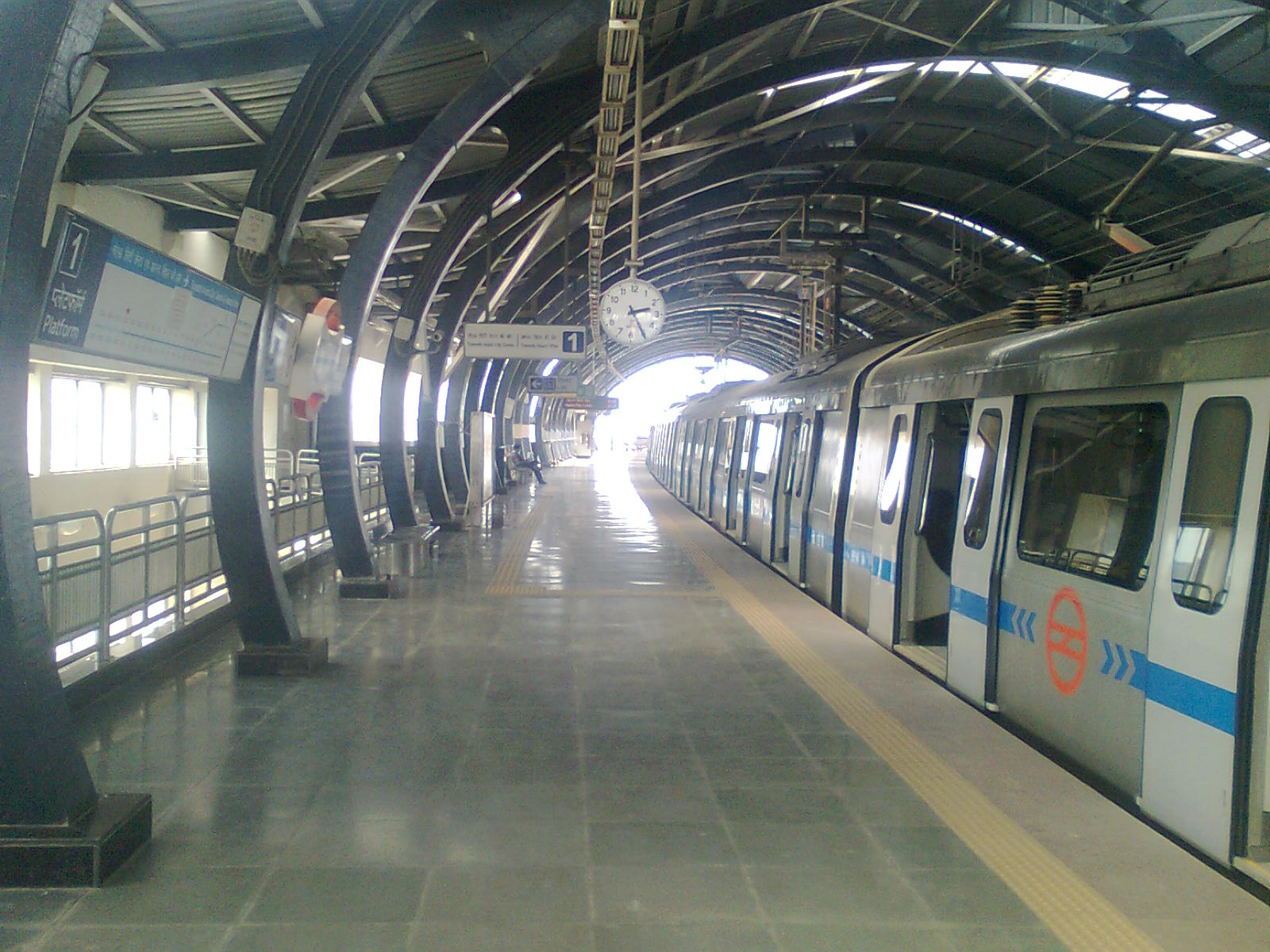

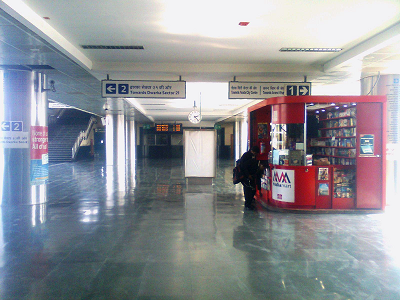
Inside premises

== See also ==
- Delhi
- List of Delhi Metro stations
- Transport in Delhi
- Delhi Metro Rail Corporation
- Delhi Suburban Railway
- Delhi Monorail
- Delhi Transport Corporation
- West Delhi
- New Delhi
- Dwarka, Delhi
- National Capital Region (India)
- List of rapid transit systems
- List of metro systems
