= Dwarka Sector 13 metro station =

Metro station in Delhi, India

Dwarka Sector 13 द्वारका सेक्टर 13

General information
- Location: Sector 13, Dwarka, New Delhi, 110078
- Coordinates: 28°35′50″N 77°02′00″E
- System: Delhi Metro station
- Owner: Delhi Metro
- Operator: Delhi Metro Rail Corporation (DMRC)
- Line: Blue Line
- Platforms: Side platform; Platform-1 → Noida Electronic City / Vaishali; Platform-2 → Dwarka Sector 21
- Tracks: 2

Construction
- Structure type: Elevated, Double-track
- Platform levels: 2
- Parking: Available
- Accessible: Yes

Other information
- Station code: DSTN

History
- Opened: 1 April 2006; 20 years ago
- Electrified: 25 kV 50 Hz AC through overhead catenary

Passengers
- Jan 2015: 3,457/day 107,172/ Month average

Services
Preceding station	Delhi Metro	Following station
Dwarka Sector 12 towards Dwarka Sector 21	Blue Line	Dwarka Sector 14 towards Noida Electronic City or Vaishali
Route map
Location

The Dwarka Sector 13 metro station is located on the Blue Line of the Delhi Metro. Opposite the Radisson Blu Hotel.

== The station ==
=== Station layout ===
L2	Side platform | Doors will open on the left
L2	Platform 1 Eastbound	Towards → Noida Electronic City / Vaishali; Next Station: Dwarka Sector 14
L2	Platform 2 Westbound	Towards ← Dwarka Sector 21; Next Station: Dwarka Sector 12
L2	Side platform | Doors will open on the left
L1	Concourse	Fare control, station agent, Metro Card vending machines, crossover
G	Street Level	Exit/Entrance

=== Facilities ===
List of available ATM at Dwarka Sector 13 metro station Punjab National Bank, Punjab & Sind Bank, Canara Bank.

== Entry/Exit ==
Dwarka Sector 13 metro station Entry/exits
Gate No-1	Gate No-2
Abhinav Global School (350 metres)	Metro View Apartment

== See also ==
- Delhi
- List of Delhi Metro stations
- Transport in Delhi
- Delhi Metro Rail Corporation
- Delhi Suburban Railway
- Delhi Monorail
- Delhi Transport Corporation
- West Delhi
- New Delhi
- Dwarka, Delhi
- National Capital Region (India)
- List of rapid transit systems
- List of metro systems
