= Dwarka Sector 10 metro station =

Metro station in Delhi, India

Dwarka Sector 10 द्वारका सेक्टर 10

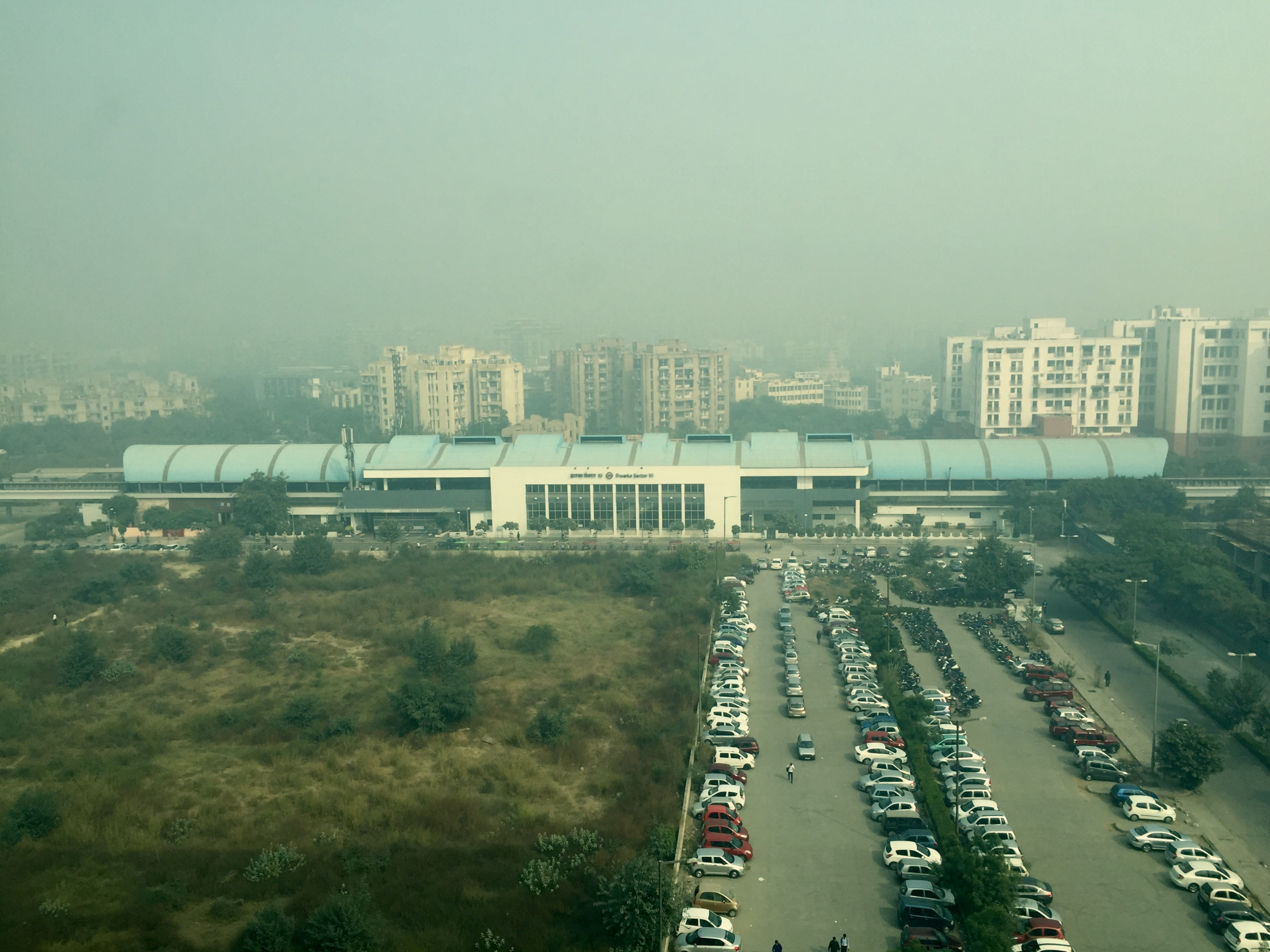

General information
- Location: Sector 10, Dwarka, Delhi
- Coordinates: 28°34′52″N 77°03′27″E
- System: Delhi Metro station
- Owner: Delhi Metro
- Operator: Delhi Metro Rail Corporation (DMRC)
- Line: Blue Line
- Platforms: Side platform; Platform-1 → Noida Electronic City / Vaishali; Platform-2 → Dwarka Sector 21
- Tracks: 2

Construction
- Structure type: Elevated, Double-track
- Platform levels: 2
- Parking: Available
- Accessible: Yes

Other information
- Station code: DST

History
- Opened: 1 April 2006; 20 years ago
- Electrified: 25 kV 50 Hz AC through overhead catenary

Passengers
- Jan 2015: 7,894/day 244,713/ Month average

Services
Preceding station	Delhi Metro	Following station
Dwarka Sector 9 towards Dwarka Sector 21	Blue Line	Dwarka Sector 11 towards Noida Electronic City or Vaishali
Route map
Location

The Dwarka Sector 10 (known as PNB Dwarka Sector 10 for sponsorship reasons) metro station is located on the Blue Line of the Delhi Metro.

== The station ==
=== Station layout ===
L2	Side platform | Doors will open on the left
L2	Platform 1 Eastbound	Towards → Noida Electronic City / Vaishali; Next Station: Dwarka Sector 11
L2	Platform 2 Westbound	Towards ← Dwarka Sector 21; Next Station: Dwarka Sector 9
L2	Side platform | Doors will open on the left
L1	Concourse	Fare control, station agent, Metro Card vending machines, crossover
G	Street Level	Exit/Entrance

=== Facilities ===
List of available ATM at Dwarka Sector 10 metro station are Punjab National Bank, State Bank of India, Canara Bank.

== Connections ==
Delhi Transport Corporation bus routes number 728A, 728E, 770B, 775A, 840STL serves the station from Dwarka District Court stop nearby.

== See also ==
- Delhi
- List of Delhi Metro stations
- Transport in Delhi
- Delhi Metro Rail Corporation
- Delhi Suburban Railway
- Delhi Monorail
- Delhi Transport Corporation
- West Delhi
- New Delhi
- Dwarka, Delhi
- National Capital Region (India)
- List of rapid transit systems
- List of metro systems
