= Dwarka Sector 8 metro station =

Metro station in Delhi, India

Dwarka Sector 8 द्वारका सेक्टर 8

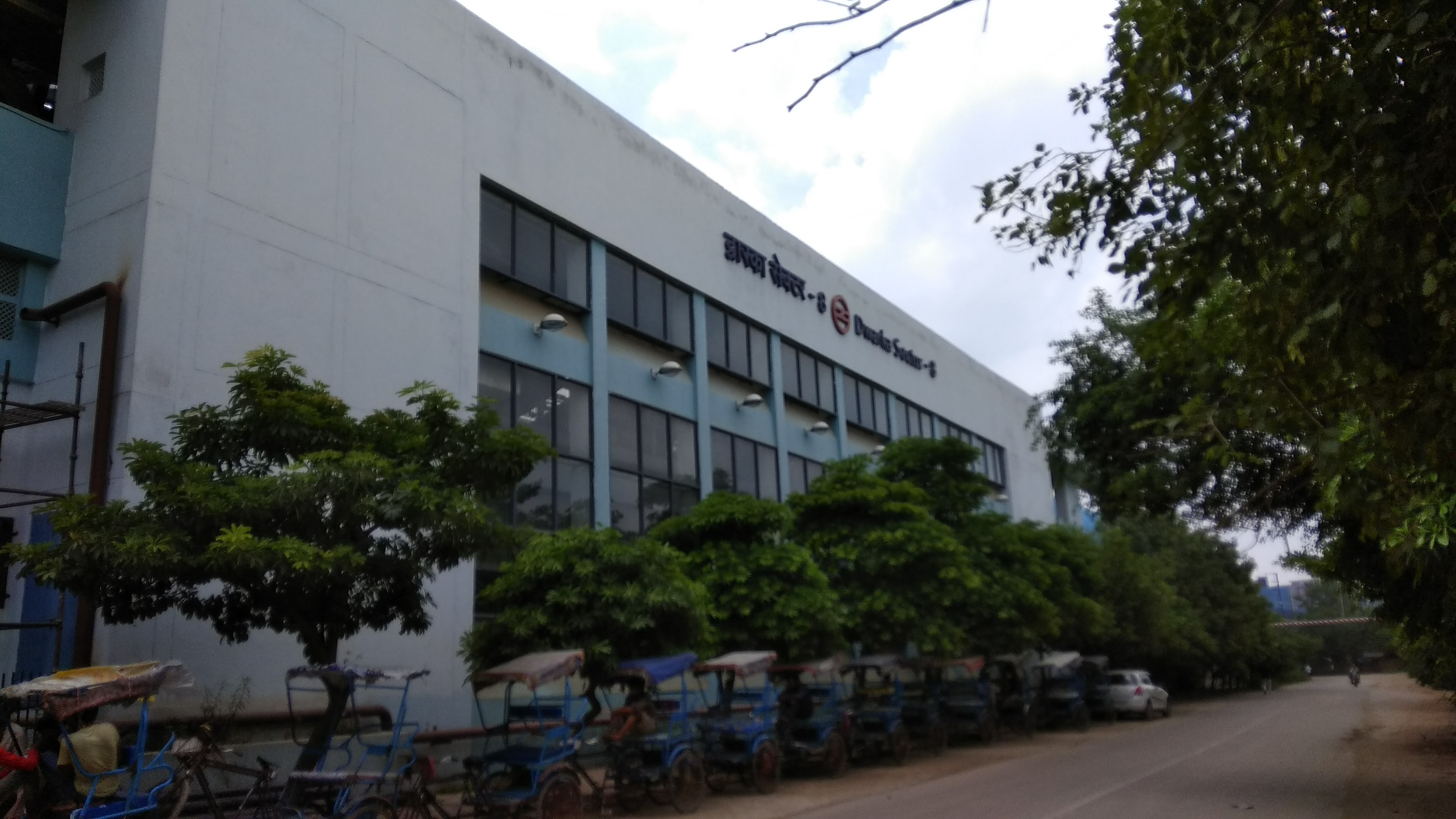
- Dwarka Sec.-8 metro station

General information
- Location: Sector 8 Dwarka, New Delhi, 110077
- Coordinates: 28°33′56″N 77°04′01″E
- System: Delhi Metro station
- Owner: Delhi Metro
- Operator: Delhi Metro Rail Corporation (DMRC)
- Line: Blue Line
- Platforms: Side platform; Platform-1 → Noida Electronic City / Vaishali; Platform-2 → Dwarka Sector 21
- Tracks: 2

Construction
- Structure type: Elevated
- Platform levels: 2
- Parking: Available
- Accessible: Yes

Other information
- Station code: DSET

History
- Opened: 30 October 2010; 15 years ago
- Electrified: 25 kV 50 Hz AC through overhead catenary

Passengers
- Jan 2015: 3,966/day 122,944/ Month average

Services
Preceding station	Delhi Metro	Following station
Dwarka Sector 21 Terminus	Blue Line	Dwarka Sector 9 towards Noida Electronic City or Vaishali
Route map
Location

The Dwarka Sector 8 metro station is located on the Blue Line of the Delhi Metro. This station was built as an extension to Sector 21 in order to serve Dwarka residents better and provide interchange with the Delhi Airport Express. The station was inaugurated on 30 October 2010, after the completion of successful trials and approval from the railway inspector.

== The station ==
=== Station layout ===
L2	Side platform | Doors will open on the left
L2	Platform 1 Eastbound	Towards → Noida Electronic City / Vaishali; Next Station: Dwarka Sector 9
L2	Platform 2 Westbound	Towards ← Dwarka Sector 21; Change at the next station for Airport Express
L2	Side platform | Doors will open on the left
L1	Concourse	Fare control, station agent, Metro Card vending machines, crossover
G	Street Level	Exit/Entrance

=== Facilities ===
List of available ATM at Dwarka Sector 8 metro station: Canara Bank.

== See also ==
- Delhi
- List of Delhi Metro stations
- Transport in Delhi
- Delhi Metro Rail Corporation
- Delhi Suburban Railway
- Delhi Monorail
- Delhi Transport Corporation
- West Delhi
- New Delhi
- Dwarka, Delhi
- National Capital Region (India)
- List of rapid transit systems
- List of metro systems
