= Kaushambi metro station =

Metro station in Delhi, India

Kaushambi

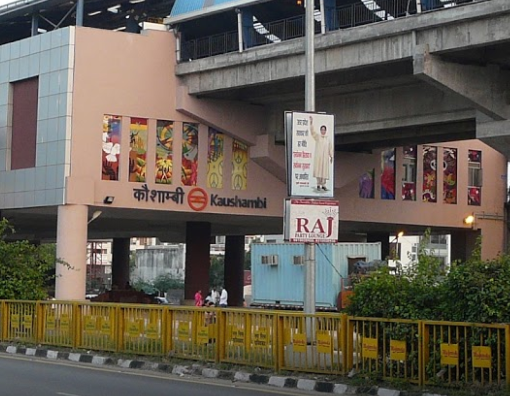

General information
- Location: Kaushambi, Ghaziabad, Uttar Pradesh 201010
- Coordinates: 28°38′44″N 77°19′27″E
- System: Delhi Metro station
- Owner: Delhi Metro
- Line: Blue Line
- Platforms: Side platform; Platform-1 → Vaishali; Platform-2 → Dwarka Sector 21
- Tracks: 2

Construction
- Structure type: Elevated
- Platform levels: 2
- Parking: Available
- Accessible: Yes

Other information
- Station code: KSHI

History
- Opened: 14 July 2011; 15 years ago
- Electrified: 25 kV 50 Hz AC through overhead catenary

Passengers
- Jan 2015: 19,412/day 601,780/ Month average

Services
| Preceding station | Delhi Metro | Following station |
|---|---|---|
| Anand Vihar towards Dwarka Sector 21 | Blue Line | Vaishali Terminus |
Route map
Location

Kaushambi is an elevated metro station located on the branch line of the Blue Line of the Delhi Metro in Delhi. Built as part of a 2.57 km extension from Anand Vihar station, it was originally expected to open in March 2011. After multiple delays, the station finally opened on 14 July 2011, with 200 parking spaces to cater to commuters in the vicinity.

== Station layout ==
| L2 | Side platform | Doors will open on the left |
| L2 | Platform 1 Eastbound | Towards → Vaishali |
| L2 | Platform 2 Westbound | Towards ← Dwarka Sector 21; Next Station: Anand Vihar Change at the next station for Pink Line |
| L2 | Side platform | Doors will open on the left |
| L1 | Concourse | Fare control, station agent, Metro Card vending machines, crossover |
| G | Street level | Exit/Entrance |

== Facilities ==
=== ATM ===
- RBL Bank
- HDFC Bank
- Punjab National Bank

=== F&B ===
An F&B counter operated by IRCTC is situated in the station premises.

=== Restaurants ===
The station is considered among the most commercially well utilized metro stations in Delhi. The ground area below the station contains restaurants such as Domino's, McDonald's, Mr. Brown Bakery, Sree Rathnam & Maini's Green Leaf.

== See also ==
- List of Delhi Metro stations
- Transport in Delhi
- Delhi Metro Rail Corporation
- Delhi Suburban Railway
- List of rapid transit systems in India
