= Khora =

Coordinates: 28.371°N 77.202°E

Khora Colony Khora Colony
- Located in Ghaziabad district, Uttar Pradesh, India

- Location in Uttar Pradesh, India Khora Colony (India)
- Country: India
- State: Uttar Pradesh
- District: Ghaziabad
- Administrative Division: Meerut division

Area
  - Total: 10 km^{2} (3.9 sq mi)
- Elevation: 212 m (696 ft)

Population (2011)
  - Total: 190,005
  - Density: 19,000/km^{2} (49,000/sq mi)
- Time zone: UTC+5:30 (IST)
- PIN: 201020
- Telephone code: 0120
- Vehicle registration: up14
- Lok Sabha Constituency: Sahibabad
- Nearest city: Indirapuram
- MLA: Sunil Kumar Sharma
- Website: www.npploni.in

Khora is a locality in Ghaziabad city in the Ghaziabad district of Uttar Pradesh, India. Its official census population is approximately 190,000 residents (2011), but reports suggest a population closer to 1,500,000 residents inside the city's area of 10 square kilometers. It is located on the NH-24 highway, near Gaziabad and Delhi, and is within the National Capital Region of India. It is bound on the west and southwest by the village of Ghazipur, on the north and northwest by Hindon Canal, on the northeast by Indirapuram (Ghaizabad), and on the east and southeast by Noida. The Chairman of Khora is Mohini Sharma

== Accessibility ==
It is connected by road to NH 24, and by rail to Anand Vihar Railway Station, While Anand Vihar is closer, the Ghaziabad Junction railway station (9 km) and Hazrat Nizamuddin Railway Station (10 km) are also proximate. It is also linked to Vaishali Station and Kaushambi Station by metro.

== Census (2011) ==
As per provisional reports of Census India, population of Khora in 2011 is 190,005; of which male and female are 102,574 and 87,431 respectively. Hinduism is majority religion in Khora city with 84.18 % followers. Islam is second most popular religion in city of Khora with approximately 14.91 % following it. In Khora city, Christianity is followed by 0.22 %, Jainism by 0.06 %, Sikhism by 0.16 % and Buddhism by 0.16 %. Around 0.01 % stated 'Other Religion', approximately 0.39 % stated 'No Particular Religion'. Literate Population of Khora is 135,994; of which 79,636 are Male and 56,358 are Female. Child Population(0-6) is 27,026; of which male and female are 14,587 and 12,439 respectively.
