= Kaushambi, Ghaziabad =

Kaushambi (Ghaziabad)
- Suburb
- Location in Uttar Pradesh, India
- Coordinates: 28°38′31″N 77°19′25″E
- Country: India
- State: Uttar Pradesh
- District: Ghaziabad

Government
  - Body: Uttar Pradesh Legislative Assembly
  - MLA: Sunil Kumar Sharma (BJP)
  - Municipal Councilor: Kusum Goyal

Languages
  - Official: Hindi
- Time zone: UTC+5:30 (IST)
- Postal code: 201010
- Vehicle registration: UP-14

Kaushambi, is a part of the planned city of Ghaziabad in Delhi NCR and state of Uttar Pradesh, is an industrially planned and well developed region, under Vasundhara Zone of Ghaziabad Municipal Corporation. Situated at the sidelines of the Delhi-U.P. border opposite side of Anand vihar in Delhi that provides quick access to the capital city. Although not large, the city holds a conglomerate of various facilities, such as a shopping complex, movie theaters, city parks, company offices, computer education, robotics training and housing societies. Being part of the most populous state of India, it receives a good number of visitors and locals. The ex Chief Minister of Delhi, Arvind Kejriwal, resided in Girnar Apartments of Kaushambi before shifting to Delhi when Aam Aadmi Party won the 2015 Delhi Elections.

== Climate ==
Kaushambi features a humid sub-tropical climate, with a variation of all seasons having a good impact all over the year. Since the city is on the outskirts of Ghaziabad, its temperature and climate is similar to that of Delhi.

== Transport ==
=== Delhi Metro ===
Transportation infrastructure is quite varied in the area as it has the feasibility of Delhi Metro with the Kaushambi Metro Station being situated there. It is an elevated metro station located on the branch line of the Blue Line of the Delhi Metro in Ghaziabad. It is part of a 2.57 km extension from Anand Vihar station. It was made functional on 14 July 2011 with 200 parking spaces to cater to commuters in the vicinity.

=== Railways ===
The railway station closest to Kaushambi, is the Anand Vihar Railway Terminal which handles all the east-bound trains from Delhi. It situated just adjacent to the Anand Vihar Metro Station. The terminal being at a distance of less than 2 km, is mostly used by the locals of the Kaushambi area.

The Delhi-Meerut RRTS, the first Rapid Rail Transit System of the country which will connect Delhi, Ghaziabad and Meerut has the Anand Vihar RRTS Station in close vicinity, and the station will be bridged with the UPSRTC Bus Stand at Kaushambi.

=== Roadways ===
Anand Vihar ISBT (Interstate Bus-Terminal) is the main source of roadways travelling for Kaushambi. It is situated in the same complex which holds the Anand Vihar Railway Terminal and the Anand Vihar Metro Station. Buses for travelling locally and for interstate travel can easily be boarded from there. Buses for further traveling can be boarded from the Kaushambi Bus Terminal. If traveling within Kaushambi or adjacent cities, the area has a unique form of road transportation popularly called 'Vikram', which are 8 seater auto-rickshaws that give you a possibility for local traveling for a minimum fare. The city is also connected with two National Highways, NH58 and NH24, which provide direct connectivity to the neighboring states.

=== Airways ===
The city has Hindon Airbase as a prominent airfield, but the base is reserved for the military. All domestic and international air travel are directed towards Indira Gandhi International Airport.

=== Hotels ===
The place has a lot of hotels for the people visiting the NCR region. Some of the well-known hotels in the area are:

- Hotel Anand Retreat
- Hotel Rousha Inn
- Hotel Mukund
- Hotel Sri Sri Residency
- Hotel Central Park
- Radisson Blu Kaushambi
- Park Crown Banquet Kaushambi
- Grand Milan Banquet Hall Kaushambi
- Rajpath Residency
- Hotel Samrat
