= Sector 62, Noida =

- City Area
- National Capital Region Territory
- Location within Uttar Pradesh
- Coordinates: 28.62°N 77.37°E
- Country: India
- Region: North India
- State: Uttar Pradesh
- City: Noida

Government
  - Body: Government of Uttar Pradesh
- Elevation: 200 m (660 ft)

Languages
  - Official: Hindi, English
- Time zone: UTC+5:30 (IST)
- PIN: 201309
- Area code: 0120
- Vehicle registration: UP-16

Sector 62, is a prime mixed-use location of Noida city. It is one of the best-planned sectors of Noida where residential and commercial areas are segregated effectively. Noida is a part of National Capital Region of India.

== Geography ==
It is located in Gautam Buddh Nagar district of Uttar Pradesh state India. It is about 20 km southeast of New Delhi, 24 kilometres (15 mi) northwest of the district headquarters, Greater Noida and 455 kilometres (283 mi) northwest of the state capital, Lucknow, 18 km from Connaught Place of New Delhi. It is bound on the west and south-west by the Yamuna River, on the north and north-west by the city of Delhi, on the north-east by the cities of Delhi and Ghaziabad, India and on the north-east, east and south-east by the Hindon River. Sector 62 falls under the catchment area of the Yamuna river and is located on the old river bed. It is famous for its modern lifestyle.

== Education ==
Sector 62, houses some of the local Universities like Symbiosis Center For Management Studies, National Institute of Biologicals, Indian Academy of Highway Engineering, ICAI, IMS, IIM Lucknow's Noida campus, Jaypee Institute of Information Technology, J.S.S Academy of Technical Education and many more. It is also home to many centers of higher learning, including MAF Academy, Symbiosis Law School and . Bank of India staff training college is also situated in this sector..

== Economy ==
Sector 62 is also a major hub for multinational firms outsourcing IT services e.g.Kronos, Barco Electronics, Amazon, Innovaccer, Landis +Gyr, Pine Labs, Vinculum Group, Samsung, Barclays Shared Services, TechMahindra, Ericsson, CRMNEXT, IBM, Miracle, Steller IT park, Unitech Infospace, Candor Techspaces, Correnthum Tower, I-thum Tower, Embassy Group, under construction Iconic Corenthum. Etc. Some of the largest software and business process outsourcing companies have their offices in this sector. It houses branches of almost all major Indian banks like State Bank of India, ICICI Bank, HDFC Bank, IndusInd Bank, Union Bank of India, Bank of Baroda, Kotak Mahindra, Yes Bank etc.

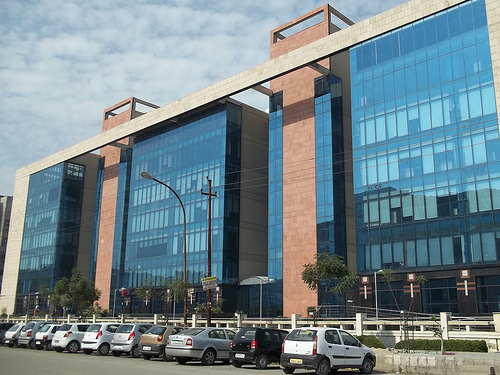
IT Park

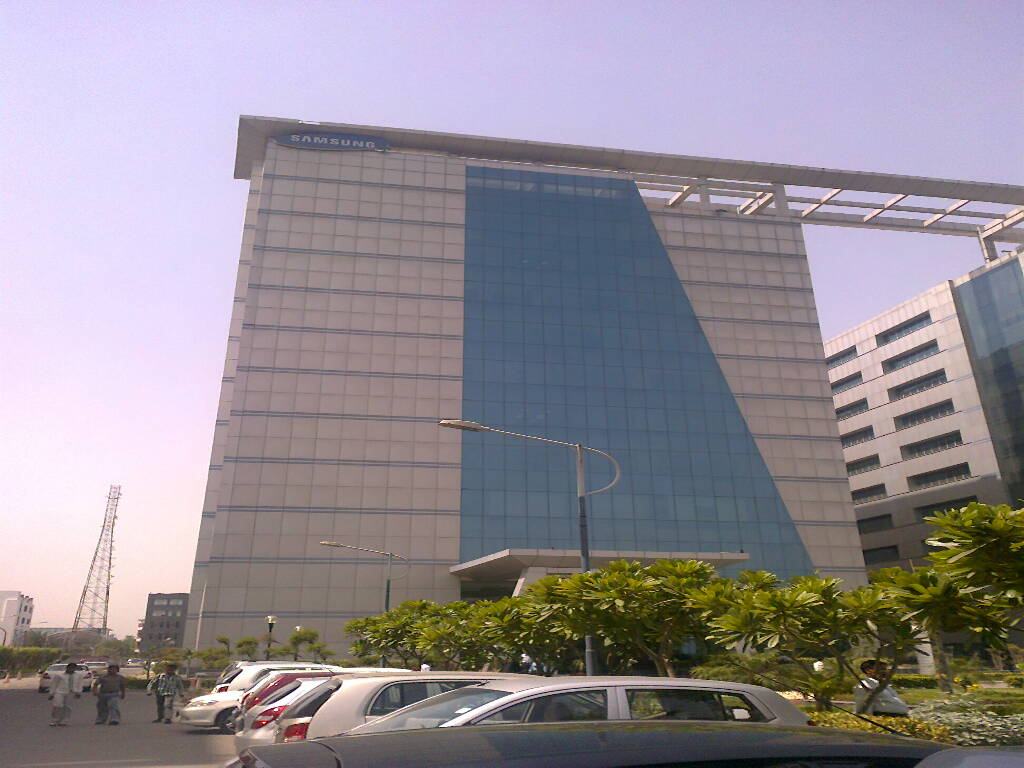
Logix Cyber Park

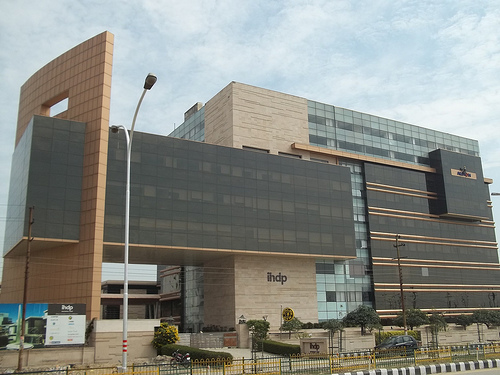
IT Park

== Transport ==
Sector 62 has good road connectivity. Blue Line Metro service has now been extended to this sector. It is connected to East Delhi with the help of National Highway 24. Nearest Metro stations are Noida Sector 62, Noida Electronic City and Noida City Center.

== Hospital ==
Fortis hospital is one of the biggest hospitals in Delhi NCR. There are several clinics in the markets of B and C blocks. This area also has Patanjali stores, Health Village, etc.

== See also ==
- Buddh International Circuit
- Greater Noida
- Gurgaon
- Noida
- Uttar Pradesh
