= Blue Line (Delhi Metro) =

Line on the Delhi Metro system

Blue Line (Line 3 & Line 4)
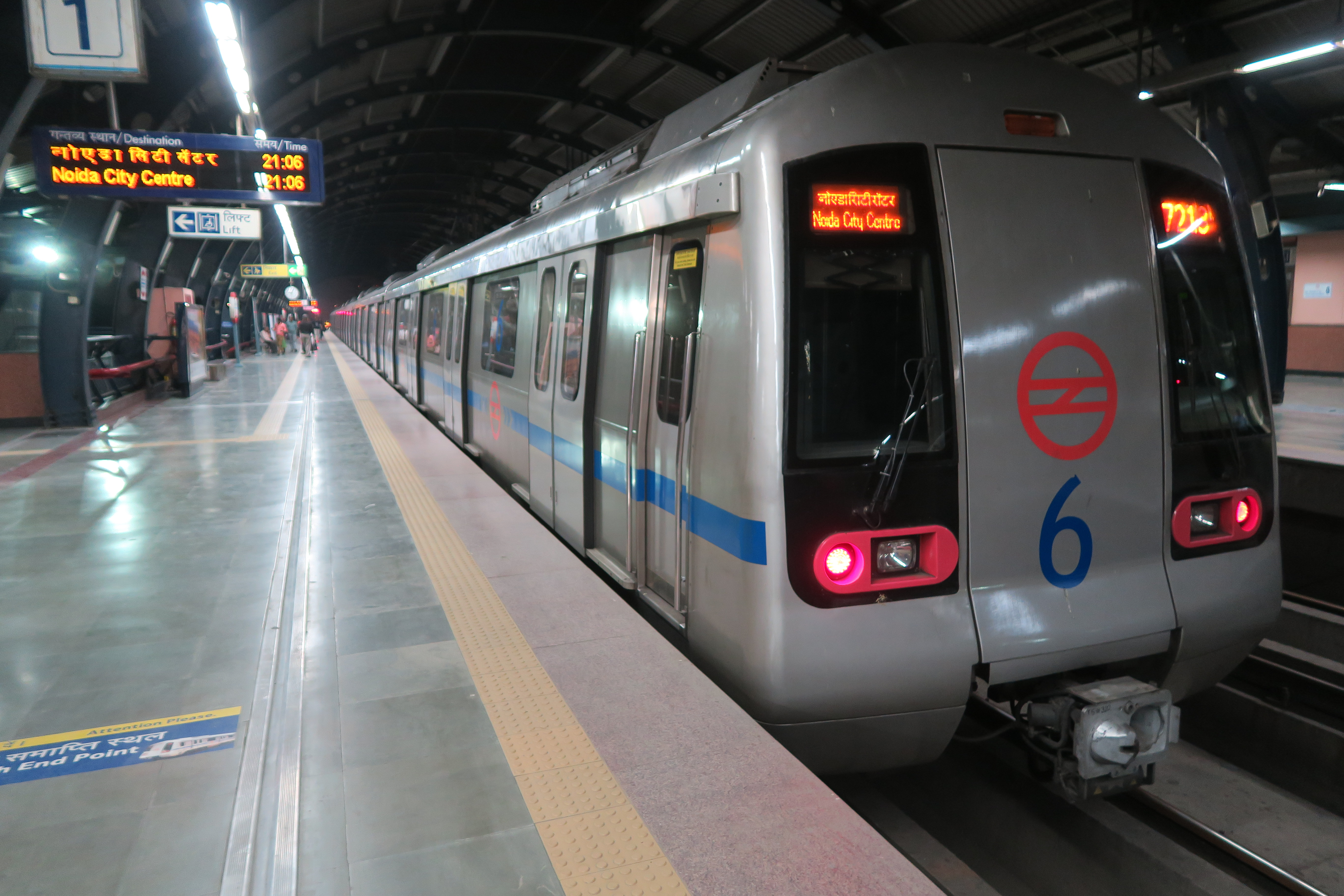
- Fleet of Blue line manufactured by Mitsubishi-ROTEM

Overview
- Status: Operational
- Locale: Delhi, Noida, Ghaziabad
- Termini: Line 3 (Main Line): Noida Electronic City and Dwarka Sector 21; Line 4 (Branch): Vaishali and Yamuna Bank
- Stations: Line 3 (Main Line): 50; Line 4 (Branch): 8

Service
- Type: Rapid transit
- System: Delhi Metro
- Operator: Delhi Metro Rail Corporation

History
- Opened: Line 3 (Main Line): 31 December 2005, Line 4 (Branch): 6 January 2010
- Last extension: 9 March 2019

Technical
- Line length: Line 3 (Main Line): 56.11 km (34.87 mi), Line 4 (Branch): 8.51 km (5.29 mi)
- Character: At-grade, Underground, and Elevated
- Track gauge: 1,676 mm (5 ft 6 in) broad gauge
- Electrification: 25 kV 50 Hz AC from overhead catenary

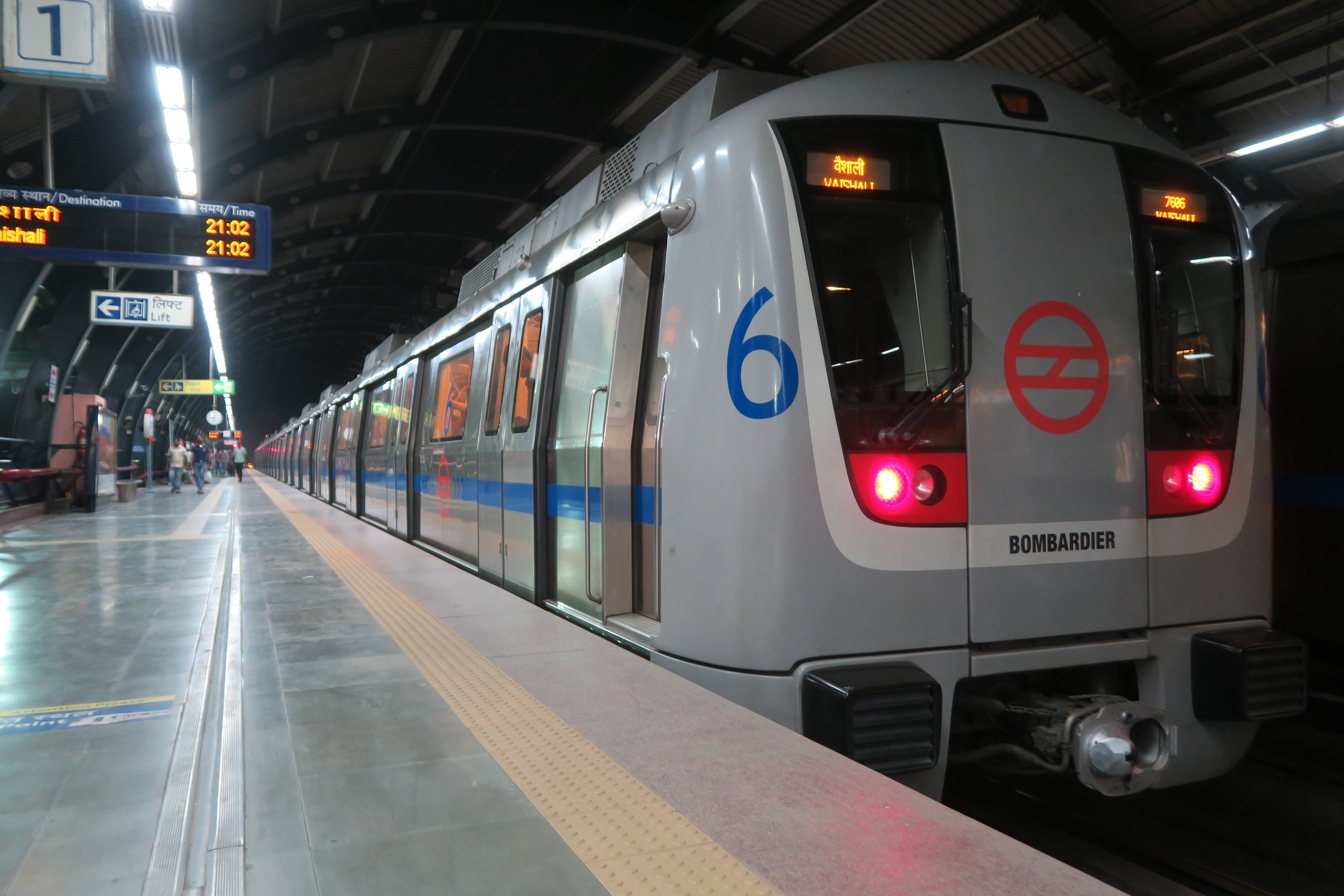
Fleets of Blue Line manufactured by Bombardier

The Blue Line (Line 3 & Line 4) is a rapid transit metro line of the Delhi Metro in Delhi, India. Predominantly elevated, it consists of a Main Line (Line 3) with 50 stations from Noida Electronic City to Dwarka Sector 21, spanning a length of 56.11 kilometres (34.87 miles), and a Branch Line (Line 4) consisting of eight stations from Vaishali to Yamuna Bank, with a length of 8.51 kilometres (5.29 miles).

The Main Line (Line 3) held the title of the longest line in the Delhi Metro network until August 6, 2021, when the inauguration of the unfinished section between Shree Ram Mandir Mayur Vihar and Trilokpuri - Sanjay Lake stations on the Pink Line extended it to a 59 km (36.66 mi)-long corridor, surpassing Line 3.

== History ==
Line 3
Blue Line - Main Line
Phase	Extension date	Termini		Length	Stations
I	31 December 2005	Dwarka-Kakrola	Barakhamba Road	22.74 km (14.13 mi)	22
I	1 April 2006	Dwarka-Kakrola	Dwarka Sector 9	6.47 km (4.02 mi)	6
I	11 November 2006	Barakhamba Road	Indraprastha	2.80 km (1.74 mi)	3
II	10 May 2009	Indraprastha	Yamuna Bank	2.17 km (1.35 mi)	1
II	12 November 2009	Yamuna Bank	Noida City Centre	12.85 km (7.98 mi)	10
II	30 October 2010	Dwarka Sector 9	Dwarka Sector 21	2.28 km (1.42 mi)	2
III	9 March 2019	Noida City Centre	Noida Electronic City	6.80 km (4.23 mi)	6
Total		Noida Electronic City	Dwarka Sector 21	56.11 km (34.87 mi)	50

Line 4
Blue Line - Branch Line
Phase	Extension date	Termini		Length	Stations
II	6 January 2010	Yamuna Bank	Anand Vihar	6.25 km (3.88 mi)	6
II	14 July 2011	Anand Vihar	Vaishali	2.26 km (1.40 mi)	2
Total		Yamuna Bank	Vaishali	8.51 km (5.29 mi)	8

The Dwarka – Barakhamba Road section of the line was inaugurated and opened to the public by the then Prime Minister of India, Dr. Manmohan Singh, on 31 December 2005. Subsequent sections opened between Dwarka – Dwarka Sector 9 on 1 April 2006, Barakhamba Road – Indraprastha on 11 November 2006, Indraprastha – Yamuna Bank on 10 May 2009, Yamuna Bank – Noida City Centre on 12 November 2009, and Dwarka Sector 9 – Dwarka Sector 21 on 30 October 2010.

A branch of the Blue line spanning 6.25 kilometres (3.88 mi) was inaugurated on 8 January 2010 from Yamuna Bank metro station to the Anand Vihar in East Delhi. It was further extended up to Vaishali, with it opening to the public on 14 July 2011. On 9 March 2019, a 6.67 km (4.14 mi) extension of the line from Noida City Centre to Noida Electronic City was unveiled to the public.

=== Phase V ===
It has been proposed to extend the main line from Noida Electronic City to Sahibabad with five stations at Vaibhav Khand, DPS Indirapuram, Shakti Khand, Vasundhara Sector 5, and Sahibabad.

== Stations ==
Karkarduma station on the Vaishali branch of the Blue Line holds the distinction of the second highest station of Delhi Metro with a platform height of 20 metres (65 feet 7 inches). Rajouri Garden station on the main line is the third highest station with a height of 17 metres (55 feet 9 inches).

=== Line 3 - Main Line ===
Delhi Metro has parking facilities at 35 metro stations on the Blue line.

Blue Line - Main Line
#	Station Name		Phase	Opening	Interchange Connection	Station Layout	Platform Level Type
#	English	Hindi	Phase	Opening	Interchange Connection	Station Layout	Platform Level Type
1	Noida Electronic City	नोएडा इलेक्ट्रॉनिक सिटी	III	9 March 2019	None	Elevated	Side
2	Noida Sector 62	नोएडा सेक्टर 62	III	9 March 2019	None	Elevated	Side
3	Noida Sector 59	नोएडा सेक्टर 59	III	9 March 2019	None	Elevated	Side
4	Noida Sector 61	नोएडा सेक्टर 61	III	9 March 2019	None	Elevated	Side
5	Noida Sector 52	नोएडा सेक्टर 52	III	9 March 2019	Aqua Line	Elevated	Side
6	Noida Sector 34	नोएडा सेक्टर 34	III	9 March 2019	None	Elevated	Side
7	Noida City Centre	नोएडा सिटी सेंटर	II	12 November 2009	None	Elevated	Side
8	Golf Course	गोल्फ़ कोर्स	II	12 November 2009	None	Elevated	Side
9	Botanical Garden	बॉटेनिकल गार्डन	II	12 November 2009	Magenta Line	Elevated	Side
10	Noida Sector 18	नोएडा सेक्टर 18	II	12 November 2009	None	Elevated	Side
11	Noida Sector 16	नोएडा सेक्टर 16	II	12 November 2009	None	Elevated	Side
12	Noida Sector 15	नोएडा सेक्टर 15	II	12 November 2009	None	Elevated	Side
13	New Ashok Nagar	न्यू अशोक नगर	II	12 November 2009	New Ashok Nagar	Elevated	Side
14	Mayur Vihar Extension	मयूर विहार एक्सटेंशन	II	12 November 2009	None	Elevated	Island
15	Mayur Vihar-I	मयूर विहार-I	II	12 November 2009	Pink Line	Elevated	Island
16	Akshardham	अक्षरधाम	II	12 November 2009	None	Elevated	Side
17	Yamuna Bank	यमुना बैंक	II	10 May 2009	Blue Line - (Branch Line - Line 4)	At Grade	Island
18	Indraprastha	इंद्रप्रस्थ	I	11 November 2006	Magenta Line (Phase IV and V(A) - Under Construction)	Elevated	Side
19	Supreme Court	सुप्रीम कोर्ट	I	11 November 2006	None	Elevated	Side
20	Mandi House	मण्डी हाउस	I	11 November 2006	Violet Line	Underground	Side
21	Barakhamba Road	बाराखम्बा रोड़	I	31 December 2005	None	Underground	Side
22	Rajiv Chowk	राजीव चौक	I	31 December 2005	Yellow Line	Underground	Side
23	Ramakrishna Ashram Marg	रामकृष्ण आश्रम मार्ग	I	31 December 2005	Magenta Line (Phase IV - Under Construction)	Elevated	Side
24	Jhandewalan	झंडेवालान	I	31 December 2005	None	Elevated	Side
25	Karol Bagh	क़रोल बाग़	I	31 December 2005	None	Elevated	Side
26	Rajendra Place	राजेंद्र प्लेस	I	31 December 2005	None	Elevated	Side
27	Patel Nagar	पटेल नगर	I	31 December 2005	None	Elevated	Side
28	Shadipur	शादीपुर	I	31 December 2005	None	Elevated	Side
29	Kirti Nagar	कीर्ति नगर	I	31 December 2005	Green Line	Elevated	Side
30	Moti Nagar	मोती नगर	I	31 December 2005	None	Elevated	Side
31	Ramesh Nagar	रमेश नगर	I	31 December 2005	None	Elevated	Side
32	Rajouri Garden	राजौरी गार्डन	I	31 December 2005	Pink Line	Elevated	Side
33	Tagore Garden	टैगोर गार्डन	I	31 December 2005	None	Elevated	Side
34	Subhash Nagar	सुभाष नगर	I	31 December 2005	None	Elevated	Side
35	Tilak Nagar	तिलक नगर	I	31 December 2005	None	Elevated	Side
36	Janakpuri East	जनकपुरी पूर्व	I	31 December 2005	None	Elevated	Side
37	Janakpuri West	जनकपुरी पश्चिम	I	31 December 2005	Magenta Line	Elevated	Side
38	Uttam Nagar East	उत्तम नगर पूर्व	I	31 December 2005	None	Elevated	Side
39	Uttam Nagar West	उत्तम नगर पश्चिम	I	31 December 2005	None	Elevated	Side
40	Nawada	नवादा	I	31 December 2005	None	Elevated	Side
41	Dwarka Mor	द्वारका मोड़	I	31 December 2005	None	Elevated	Side
42	Dwarka-Kakrola	द्वारका-ककरोला	I	31 December 2005	Grey Line	Elevated	Side
43	Dwarka Sector 14	द्वारका सेक्टर 14	I	1 April 2006	None	Elevated	Side
44	Dwarka Sector 13	द्वारका सेक्टर 13	I	1 April 2006	None	Elevated	Side
45	Dwarka Sector 12	द्वारका सेक्टर 12	I	1 April 2006	None	Elevated	Side
46	Dwarka Sector 11	द्वारका सेक्टर 11	I	1 April 2006	None	Elevated	Side
47	Dwarka Sector 10	द्वारका सेक्टर 10	I	1 April 2006	None	Elevated	Side
48	Dwarka Sector 9	द्वारका सेक्टर 9	I	1 April 2006	None	Elevated	Side
49	Dwarka Sector 8	द्वारका सेक्टर 8	II	30 October 2010	None	Elevated	Side
50	Dwarka Sector 21	द्वारका सेक्टर 21	II	30 October 2010	Airport Express	Underground	Side

=== Line 4 - Branch Line ===
Blue Line - Branch Line
#	Station Name		Phase	Opening	Interchange Connection	Station Layout	Platform Level Type
#	English	Hindi	Phase	Opening	Interchange Connection	Station Layout	Platform Level Type
1	Yamuna Bank	यमुना बैंक	II	10 May 2009	Blue Line - (Main Line)	At Grade	Side
2	Laxmi Nagar	लक्ष्मी नगर	II	6 January 2010	None	Elevated	Side
3	Nirman Vihar	निर्माण विहार	II	6 January 2010	None	Elevated	Side
4	Preet Vihar	प्रीत विहार	II	6 January 2010	None	Elevated	Side
5	Karkarduma	कड़कड़डूमा	II	6 January 2010	Pink Line	Elevated	Side
6	Anand Vihar	आनंद विहार	II	6 January 2010	Pink Line; Anand Vihar; Anand Vihar Terminal; Anand Vihar ISBT	Elevated	Side
7	Kaushambi	कौशाम्बी	II	14 July 2011	None	Elevated	Side
8	Vaishali	वैशाली	II	14 July 2011	None	Elevated	Side

== Train Info ==
Blue Line
Rakes	Mitsubishi Rotem BEML RS-1	Bombardier Transportation MOVIA RS-2
Train Length	8	
Train Gauge	1,676 mm (5 ft 6 in) broad gauge	
Electrification	25 kV 50 Hz AC (nominal) from overhead catenary	
Train's Maximum Speed	100 km/h	
Train Operation	Dwarka Sector 21 - Vaishali / Noida Electronic City Dwarka - Vaishali / Noida Electronic City	

== Future extension ==
Yamuna Bank to Loni: from the existing Yamuna Bank metro station, the Blue Line Metro will be extended 12 km (7.5 mi) upwards to Loni on the Delhi-Ghaziabad border in Phase-V.

Dwarka Sector 21 to Udyog Vihar: from the existing Dwarka Sector 21 metro station, the Blue Line Metro is planned to be extended by 11 kilometres to Udyog Vihar, Gurgaon, as part of the proposed 18 corridors under the Phase V extension.

== See also ==
- List of Delhi Metro stations
- Transport in Delhi
- Delhi Metro Rail Corporation
- Delhi Suburban Railway
- Delhi Transport Corporation
- National Capital Region (India)
