= Vaishali metro station =

Metro station in Uttar Pradesh, India

Vaishali

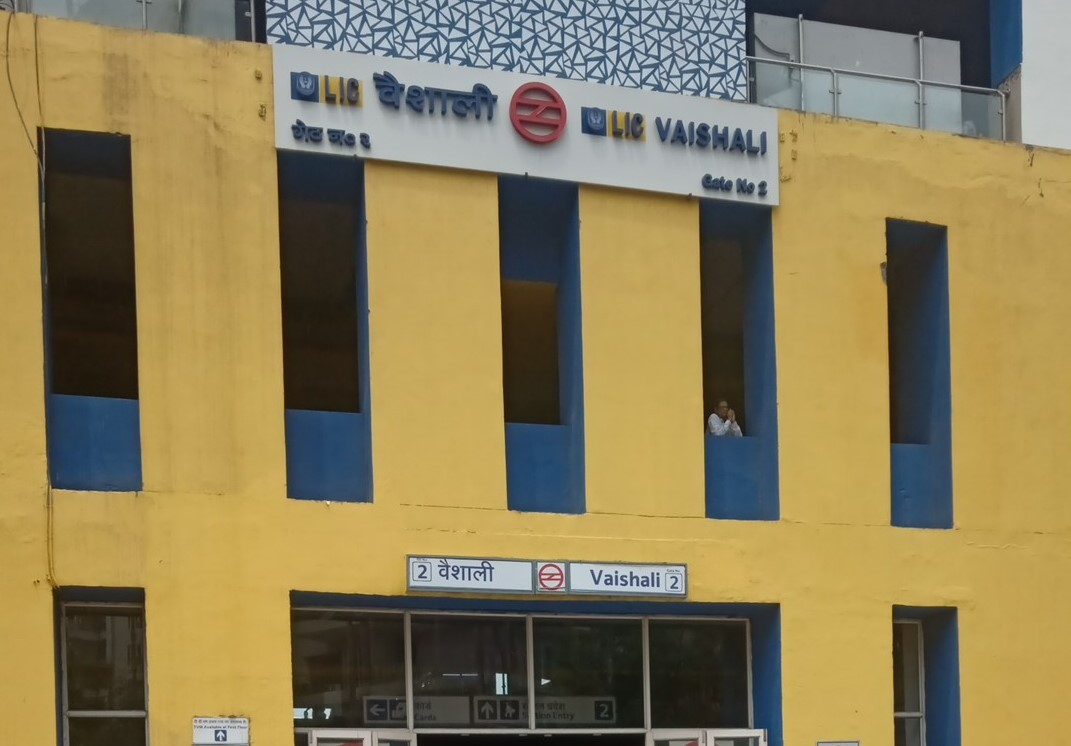

General information
- Location: Madan Mohan Malviya Marg, Gaur Ganga 2, Phase 1, Sector 4, Vaishali, Ghaziabad, Uttar Pradesh 201010
- Coordinates: 28°39′00″N 77°20′23″E
- System: Delhi Metro station
- Owner: Delhi Metro
- Operator: Delhi Metro Rail Corporation (DMRC)
- Line: Blue Line
- Platforms: Side platform Platform-1 → Train Terminates Here; Platform-2 → Dwarka Sector 21
- Tracks: 2

Construction
- Structure type: Elevated, Double-track
- Platform levels: 2
- Parking: Available
- Accessible: Yes

Other information
- Status: Staffed, Operational
- Station code: VASI

History
- Opened: 14 July 2011; 15 years ago
- Electrified: 25 kV 50 Hz AC through overhead catenary

Services
Preceding station	Delhi Metro	Following station
Kaushambi towards Dwarka Sector 21	Blue Line	Terminus
Route map
Location

Vaishali is an elevated metro station on the Vaishali branch of the Blue Line of the Delhi Metro, located in the Trans-Hindon area of Ghaziabad, Uttar Pradesh. It serves as the eastern terminus of the branch line (Line 4).

The station serves the residential neighbourhoods of Vaishali, Vasundhara, Maharajpur, Indirapuram and Khora in Ghaziabad, along with nearby areas of Sahibabad and Kaushambi.

== Station layout ==
L2	Side platform | Doors will open on the left
L2	Platform 1 Eastbound	Towards → Train Terminates Here
L2	Platform 2 Westbound	Towards ← Dwarka Sector 21; Next Station: Kaushambi
L2	Side platform | Doors will open on the left
L1	Concourse	Fare control, station agent, Metro Card vending machines, crossover
G	Street level	Exit/Entrance

=== Facilities ===
All of the stations entrances are wheelchair accessible.

The station has the following facilities:

- Token Vending Machine: One token vending machine on the first floor near gate number 3
- ATM: PNB ATM on the second floor's unpaid concourse
- Food/Restaurant: Burger King on the first floor near gate number 3 and Yamient Bite on the ground floor near gate number 2
- Toilet: 2 Sulabh Toilets- One near the frisking point and the second on the ground floor near gate number 2
- Lounge/Party Hall: Hollywood Dreams and Rudraksh Banquet party halls on the ground floor

== Exits ==
Vaishali metro station entry/exits
Gate No-1	Gate No-2	Gate No-3
Towards Mohan Nagar - Anand Vihar Road	Towards Vaishali Sector 3 and 4	Towards the Foot Over Bridge

== See also ==
- List of Delhi Metro stations
- Transport in Delhi
- Delhi Metro Rail Corporation
- Delhi Suburban Railway
- List of rapid transit systems in India
- Delhi Transport Corporation
- List of Metro Systems
- National Capital Region (India)
- East Delhi
