= Noida Electronic City metro station =

Metro station in Noida, India

Noida Electronic City

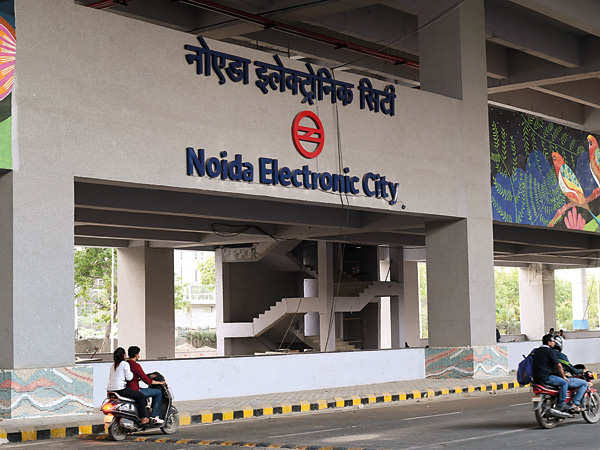

General information
- Location: H Block, Noida Electronic City, Sector 62-63, Noida, Uttar Pradesh 201301
- Coordinates: 28°37′41″N 77°22′30″E
- System: Delhi Metro station
- Owner: Delhi Metro
- Operator: Delhi Metro Rail Corporation (DMRC)
- Line: Blue Line
- Platforms: Side platform Platform-1 → Train Terminates Here; Platform-2 → Dwarka Sector 21
- Tracks: 2

Construction
- Structure type: Elevated, double-track
- Platform levels: 2
- Accessible: Yes

Other information
- Status: Staffed, Operational
- Station code: NECC

History
- Opened: 9 March 2019
- Electrified: Single phase 25 kV 50 Hz AC through overhead catenary

Services
Preceding station	Delhi Metro	Following station
Noida Sector 62 towards Dwarka Sector 21	Blue Line	Terminus
Route map
Location

Noida Electronic City is an elevated metro station on the Blue Line of the Delhi Metro, located in Sector 62–63 of Noida, Uttar Pradesh. It serves as the eastern terminus of the Blue Line (Line 3).

The station serves the commercial and institutional areas of Noida's Sectors 62 and 63, which host numerous information technology and business process outsourcing companies. It is also located near the Jaypee Institute of Information Technology in Sector 62 and provides metro connectivity to nearby areas such as Indirapuram in Ghaziabad.

== History ==
Construction of the Noida City Centre–Noida Electronic City section began in August 2015 and was completed on 9 March 2019. Prime Minister Narendra Modi inaugurated the 6.67 km (4.14 mi) extension on the same day.

== Station ==
=== Station layout ===
L2	Side platform | Doors will open on the left
L2	Platform 1 Eastbound	Towards → Train Terminates Here
L2	Platform 2 Westbound	Towards ← Dwarka Sector 21; Next Station: Noida Sector 62
L2	Side platform | Doors will open on the left
L1	Concourse	Fare control, station agent, Metro Card vending machines, crossover
G	Street level	Exit/Entrance

=== Facilities ===
DMRC Car Parking

== Entry/Exit ==
Noida Electronic City metro station Entry/Exit
Gate No-1	Gate No-2	Gate No-3
Indirapuram, Ghaziabad	Sector-63, Noida	Chhajarsi

== See also ==
- Delhi
- Noida
- List of Delhi Metro stations
- Transport in Delhi
- Delhi Metro Rail Corporation
- Delhi Suburban Railway
- Delhi Monorail
- Delhi Transport Corporation
- South East Delhi
- New Delhi
- National Capital Region (India)
- Noida–Greater Noida Expressway
- Noida Metro
- List of rapid transit systems
- List of metro systems
