= Dwarka Sector 21 metro station =

Metro station in Delhi, India

Dwarka Sector 21

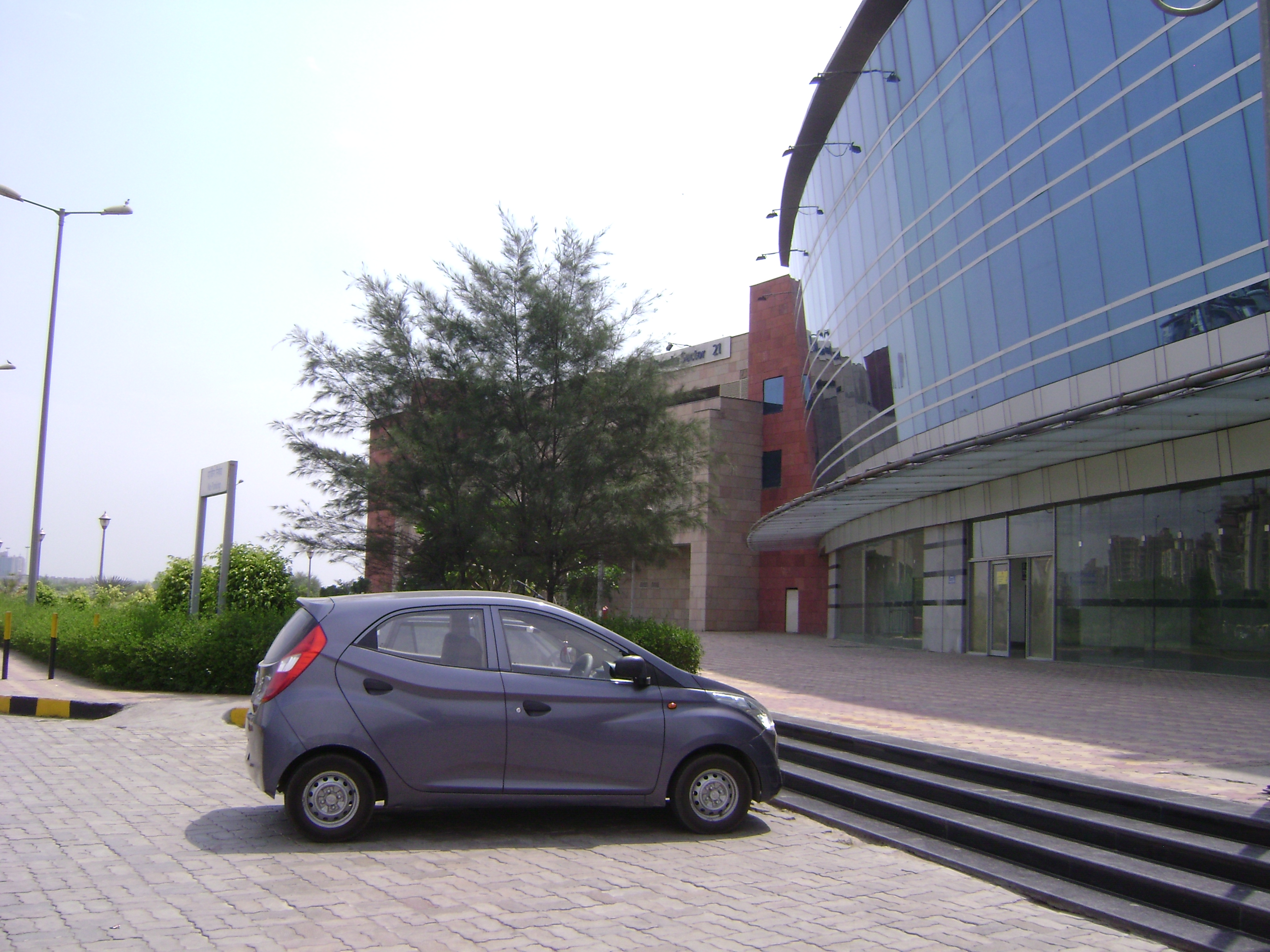
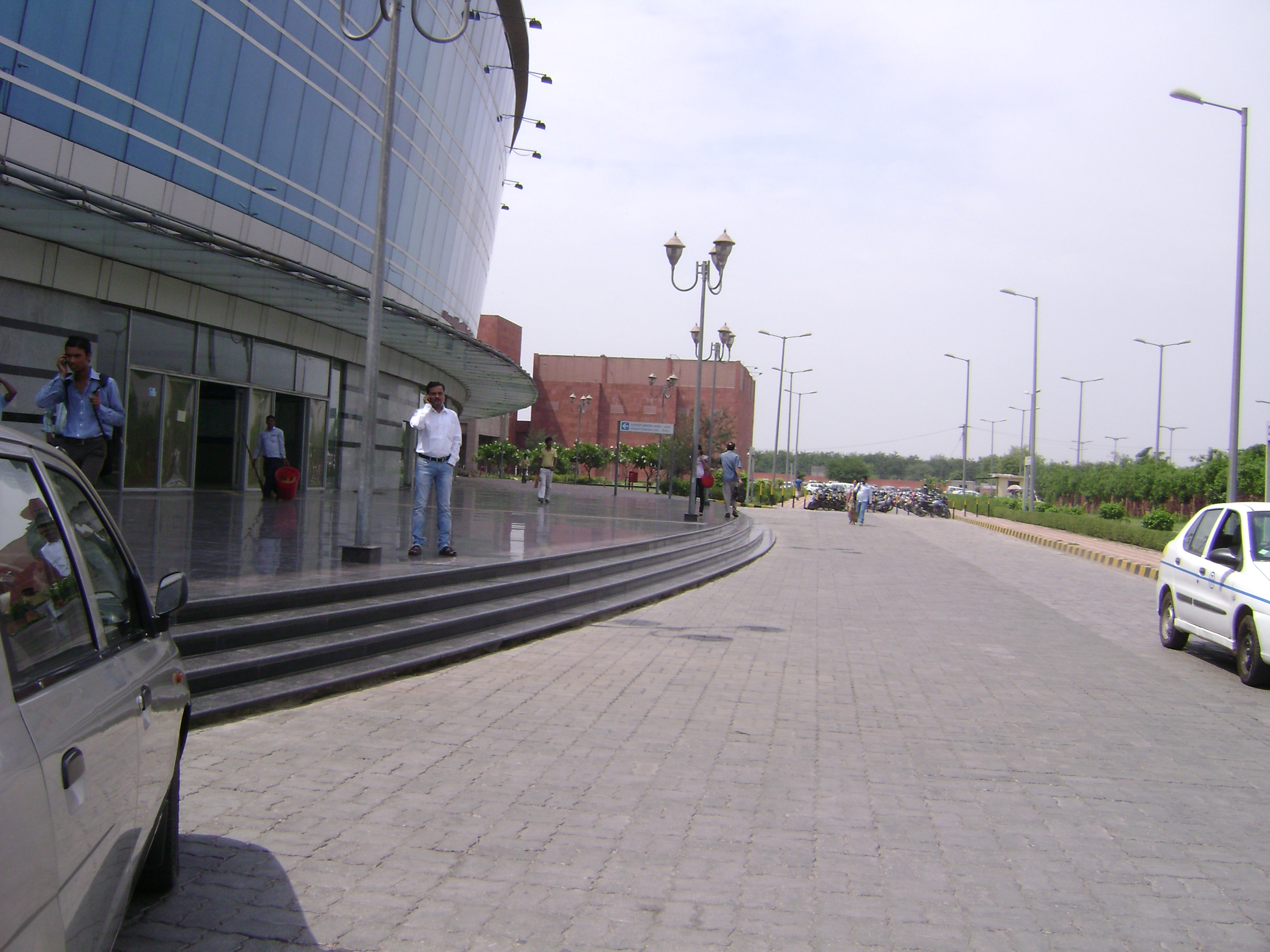

General information
- Location: Sector 21, Dwarka, Delhi
- Coordinates: 28°33′08″N 77°03′29″E
- System: Delhi Metro station
- Line: Blue Line Airport Express
- Tracks: 4
- Connections: Bijwasan (upcoming); Dwarka ISBT (upcoming)

Construction
- Structure type: Underground
- Depth: 7.07 m (23.2 ft)
- Platform levels: 2
- Parking: Yes
- Accessible: Yes

Other information
- Station code: DSTO

History
- Opened: Blue Line: October 30, 2010; 16 years ago; Airport Express February 23, 2011; 15 years ago

Services
Preceding station	Delhi Metro	Following station
Terminus	Blue Line	Dwarka Sector 8 towards Noida Electronic City or Vaishali
Yashobhoomi Dwarka Sector - 25 Terminus	Airport Express	IGI Airport towards New Delhi
Route map
Location

The Dwarka Sector 21 Metro station, located on the Blue Line and Airport Express Line of the Delhi Metro, serves as a major metro and multimodal interchange hub. It is situated near the Dwarka ISBT to the west and the Bijwasan railway station of the Indian Railways network to the east.

== History ==
This station, along with Dwarka Sector 8, was constructed as an extension to bolster connectivity provisions for Dwarka residents and facilitate interchange with the Delhi Airport Express Line. Designed by Absolute Architecture, it was inaugurated on October 30, 2010, following successful trials and approval from the railway inspector.

== Passenger facilities ==
This station has the platform screen doors on the Airport Express line.

In addition to functioning as a major interchange station for the Delhi Metro, the upper levels of the building have been rented out and converted into a mall, known as Pacific D21 Mall. The building comprises the station on the underground levels, while the ground floor and the two upper levels house commercial activities, with portions rented out to the mall. Notably, it is the first Delhi Metro station to include hotel rooms within its complex.

As of August 2014, Dwarka Sector 21 Metro station hosted the largest rooftop solar plant in the city, with an installed capacity of 500 kW, generating sufficient power to meet all its operational needs.

== Station Layout ==
G	Street level	Exit/Entrance
L1	Mezzanine	Fare control, station agent, Metro Card vending machines, crossover
L2	Side platform | Doors will open on the left
L2	Platform 2 Eastbound	Towards → Noida Electronic City / Vaishali; Next Station: Dwarka Sector 8
L2	Platform 1 Westbound	Towards ← Train Terminates Here
L2	Island platform | P1 & P3 doors will open on the left
L2	Platform 3 Southbound	Towards → New Delhi; Next Station: IGI Airport
L2	Platform 4 Northbound	Towards ← Yashobhoomi Dwarka Sector - 25
L2	Side platform | Doors will open on the left
L2

== Connectivity ==
The Dwarka Interstate Bus Terminus, spanning 27 acres opposite Dwarka Sector 21 Metro station, began construction in 2022. Designed to handle 150,000 passengers daily, it will feature air-conditioned waiting halls, washrooms, airport-style lounges, a five-star hotel, multilevel parking, and a designated taxi zone. Serving buses from Punjab and Haryana, it aims to decongest the Kashmere Gate and Sarai Kale Khan ISBTs.

Bijwasan railway station has been upgraded to serve as a major railway hub for the Indira Gandhi International Airport in its vicinity.

== See also ==
- Transport in Delhi
