= Transport in Delhi =

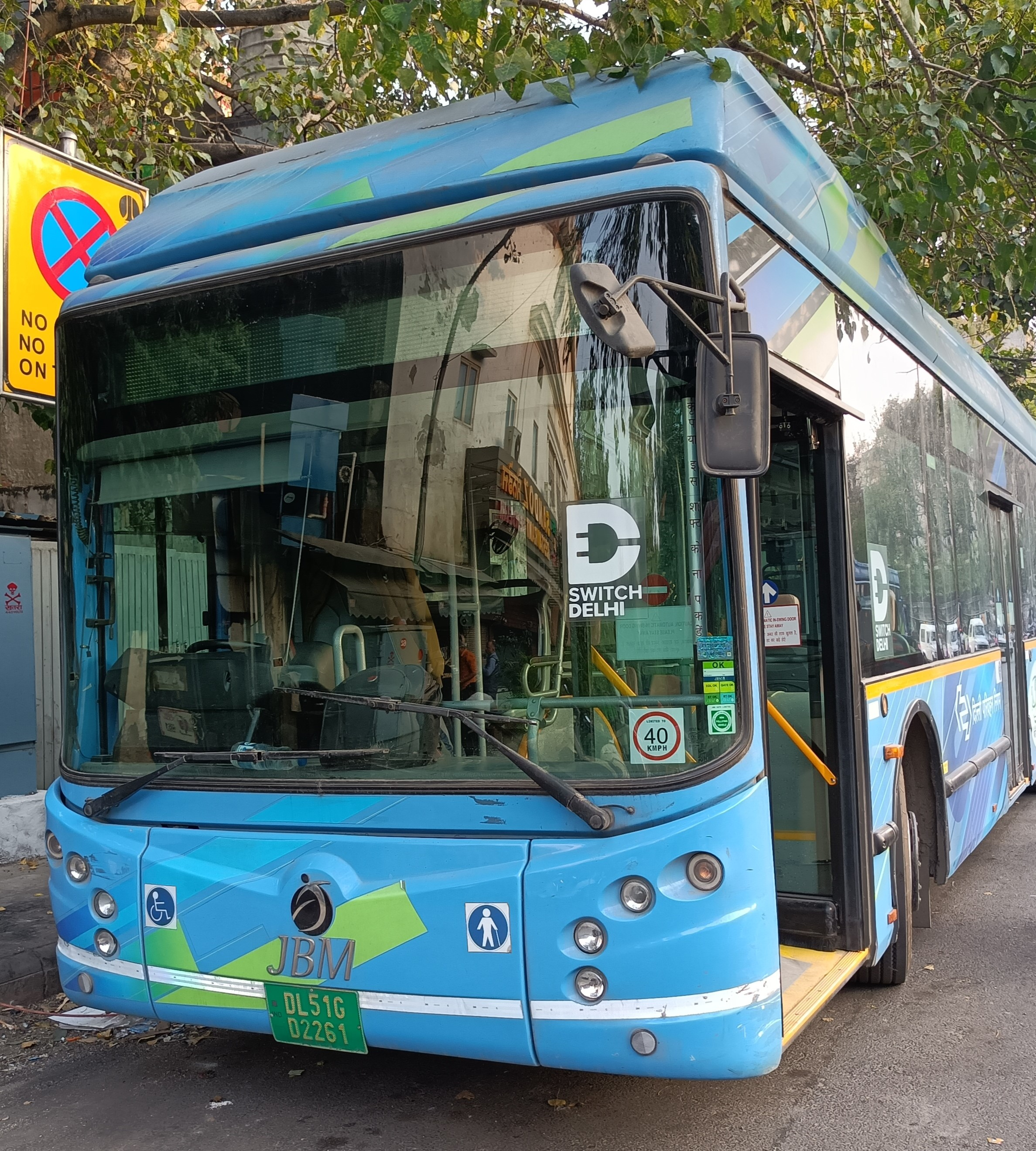
A JBM make EV DTC bus

The transport in Delhi in the National Capital Region has significant reliance on its transport infrastructure. The city has developed a highly efficient public transport system with the introduction of the Delhi Metro, which is undergoing a rapid modernization and expansion since 2006. There are 16.6 million registered vehicles in the city as of 30 June 2014, which is the highest in the world among all cities, most of which do not follow any pollution emission norm (within municipal limits), while the Delhi metropolitan region (NCR Delhi) has 11.2 million vehicles. Delhi and NCR lose nearly 42 crore (420 million) man-hours every month while commuting between home and office through public transport, due to the traffic congestion. Therefore, serious efforts, including a number of transport infrastructure projects, are under way to encourage usage of public transport in the city.

== History ==
Prior to independence in the 1940s, public transport in the city was in private hands, with people relying mainly on tongas and the bus service of the 'Gwalior Transport Company' and 'Northern India Transport Company'. But with the growing city, it soon proved inadequate, thus Delhi Transport Corporation (DTC) bus system was established in May 1948. The next big leap in city transport was the opening of Delhi Metro, a rapid transit system in 2002.

== Overview ==
Public transport in the metropolis includes the Delhi Metro, the Delhi Transport Corporation (DTC) and DIMTS (Delhi Integrated Multi Modal Transit System) bus system, auto-rickshaws, cycle-rickshaws, e-rickshaws, Grameen Seva and taxis. With the introduction of Delhi Metro, a rail-based mass rapid transit system, rail-based transit systems have gained ground. Other means of transit include suburban railways, inter-state bus services and private taxis which can be rented for various purposes. However, buses continue to be the most popular means of transportation for intra-city travel, catering to about 60% of the total commuting requirements.

Private vehicles account for 30% of the total demand for transport, while the rest of the demand is met largely by auto-rickshaws, taxis, rapid transit system and railways.

Indira Gandhi International Airport (IGI) serves Delhi for both domestic and international air connections, and is situated in the south-western corner of the city. In 2024–2025, IGI recorded a traffic of 77,820,834 passengers, making it the ninth busiest airport worldwide. Hindon Airport is a domestic airport operated by the Airports Authority of India at Hindan Air Force Station of the Indian Air Force. A new airport, the Noida International Airport is being built near Greater Noida alongside the Delhi-Agra highway.

The only international rail service in Delhi was the Samjhauta Express to Lahore, which was stopped in 2019 following a standoff. It is possible to change trains to board rail services to Bangladesh and Nepal which commence in other cities of India. For the future, a high-speed rail link is being considered that would link New Delhi with Kunming, China via Myanmar

== Intra-city Transport ==
=== Road transport ===
Roads in Delhi are maintained by the Municipal Corporation of Delhi, New Delhi Municipal Council, Delhi Cantonment Board, Public Works Department and Delhi Development Authority. At 1749 km of road length per 100 km^{2}, Delhi has one of the highest road densities in India. Major roadways include the Ring Road and the Outer Ring Road, which had a traffic density of 110,000 vehicles per day in 2001. Total road length of Delhi was 28,508 km including 388 km of National Highways. Major road-based public transport facilities in Delhi are provided by DTC buses, auto-rickshaws, taxis and cycle-rickshaws.

==== Buses ====
Delhi Transport Corporation (DTC) operates the world's largest fleet of CNG-powered buses. After Pune, Delhi was the second city in India to have an operational Bus rapid transit (BRT) system. However the BRT was dismantled in 2016 due to accidents and congestion.

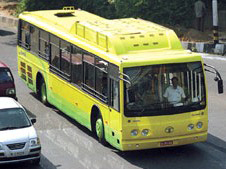
Delhi Integrated Multi-Modal Transits System

Delhi has one of India's largest bus transport systems. Buses are the most popular means of transport catering to about 60% of Delhi's total demand. Buses are operated by the state-owned Delhi Transport Corporation (DTC), which owns largest fleet of Compressed Natural Gas (CNG)-fueled buses in the world, private bus operators and several chartered bus operators. It is mandatory for all private bus operators to acquire a permit from the State Transport Authority. The buses traverse various well-defined intra-city routes. Other than regular routes, buses also travel on Railway Special routes; Metro Feeder routes. Mudrika (Ring) and Bahri Mudrika (Outer Ring) routes along Ring and Outer-Ring road respectively are amongst the longest intra-city bus routes in the world. The DTC has started introducing air-conditioned buses and brand new low-floor buses (with floor height of 400 mm and even higher on one third area as against 230 mm available internationally.) on city streets to replace the conventional buses. A revamp plan is underway to improve bus-shelters in the city and to integrate GPS systems in DTC buses and bus stops so as to provide reliable information about bus arrivals. In 2007, after public uproar concerning the large number of accidents caused by privately owned Blueline buses, the Delhi government, under pressure from the Delhi High Court decided that all Blueline Buses would be phased out and replaced by low floor buses of the state-owned DTC. The Delhi Government has decided to expedite this process and will procure 6,600 low floor buses for the DTC by commonwealth games next year in mid 2010.

The fleet size of buses in Delhi is as follows:

Ownership	Fleet Strength	Notes
DTC	4359	including 1,250 e-buses
DIMTS	3126	also known as Cluster Buses
Delhi Metro Feeder	742	including 100 e-buses and additional 380 buses operated by GNCTD
Total	8227	

==== Auto-rickshaws ====
The auto-rickshaws (popularly known as Auto) are an important and popular means of public transportation in Delhi, as they are cheaper than taxis. Hiring an Auto in Delhi is very tricky, as very few auto-drivers agree to standard meter charges. The typical method is to haggle for an agreeable rate.

==== Taxis ====
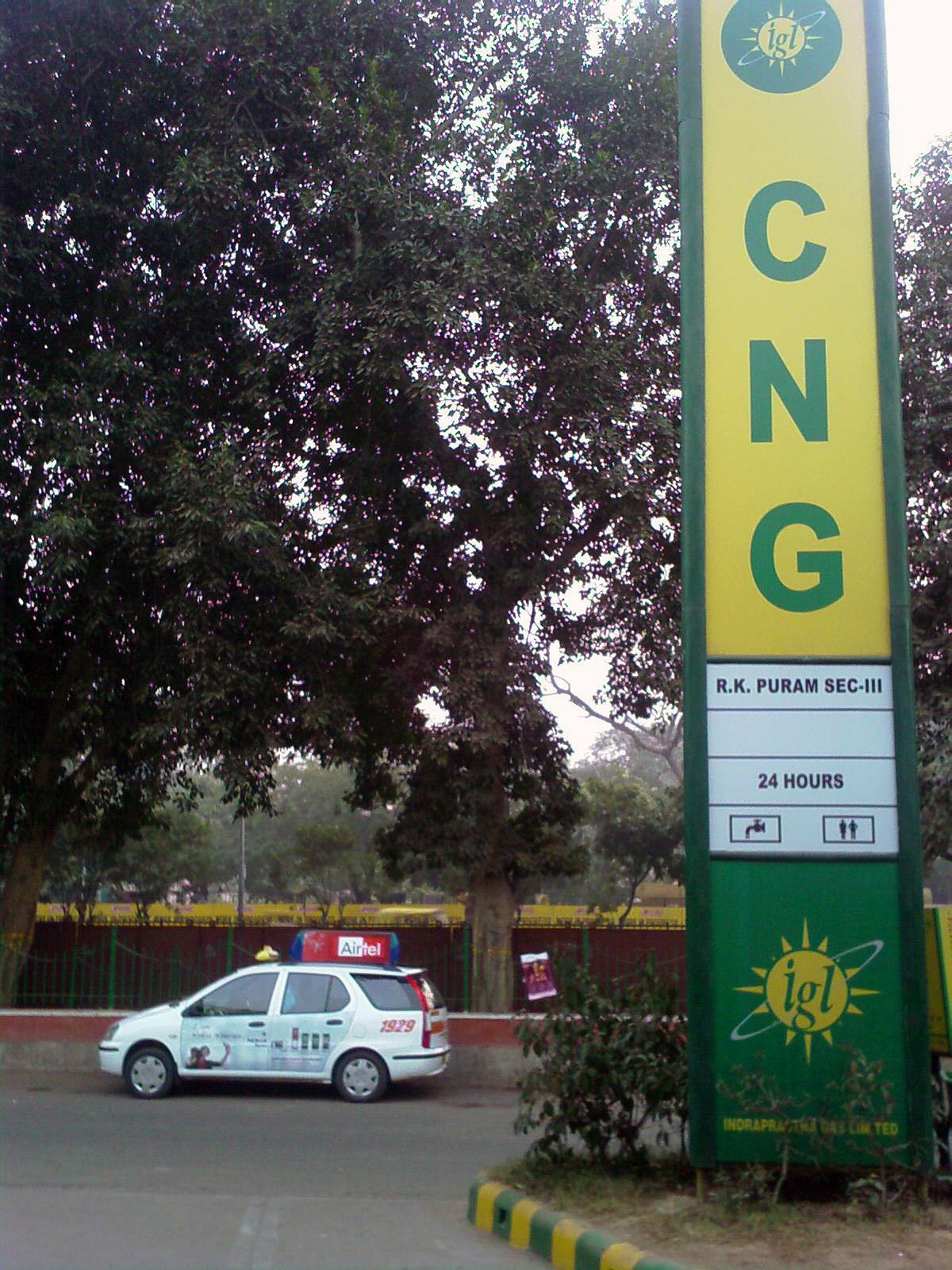
Radio taxi powered by CNG

Radio Taxi near airport

Taxis can be easily hailed in Delhi. As of December 2017, there are over 148,434 registered taxis in Delhi. The Indian Tourism Ministry and various private owners operate most taxis. The Tourism Ministry grants private companies permits to operate taxis. In recent years, online cab services like Uber and Ola have become popular in Delhi.

==== Cycle-rickshaws ====
Cycle-rickshaws are a popular mode of travel for short distance transits in the city. The pedal-powered rickshaws are easily available throughout the city and reckoned for being cheap and environment friendly. Often, tourists and citizens use them for joyrides, too. Of late, they have been phased out from the congested areas of Chandni Chowk because of their slow pace, which often leads to traffic snarls on the streets of Old Delhi.

==== Major Arteries ====
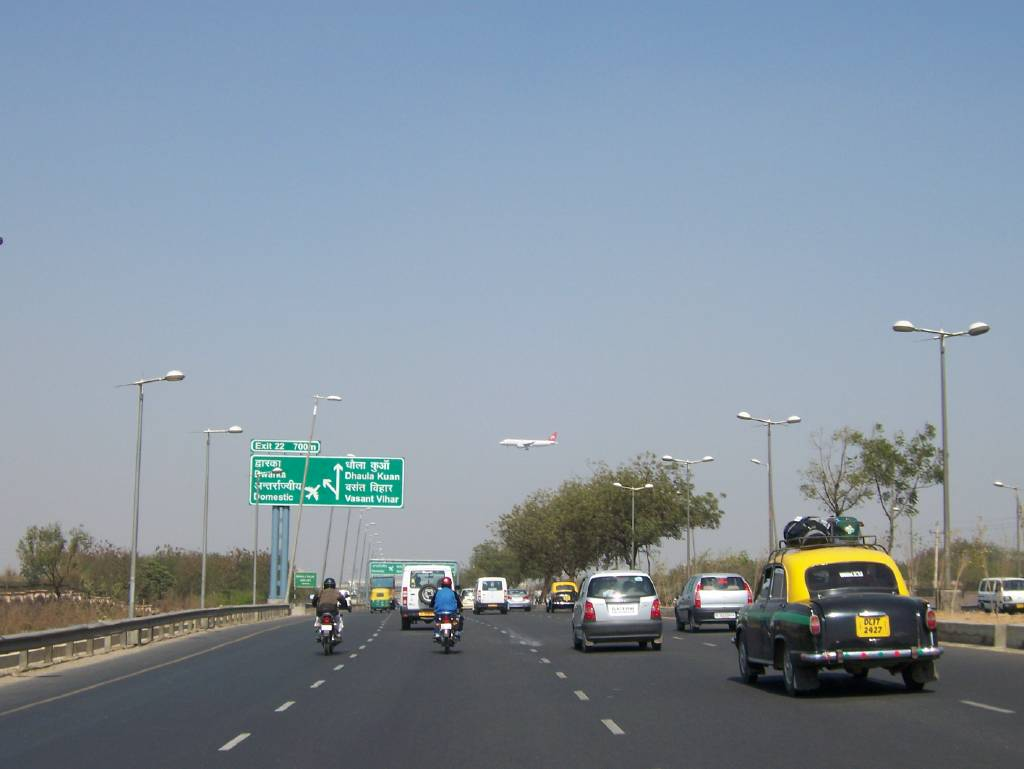
Delhi-Gurgaon Expressway connects both cities with the airport.

===== Inner Ring Road =====
Inner Ring Road is one of the most important "state highways" in Delhi. It is a 51 km long circular road, which connects northern, eastern, western and southern areas in Delhi. Owing to more than 2 dozen grade-separators/flyovers, the road is almost signal-free. The road is generally 8-laned with a few bottlenecks at certain stretches, which are being removed. The road has already achieved its carrying capacity of 110000 vehicles per day and would require an addition of more lanes to fulfill needs of increasing traffic by 2011.

===== Outer Ring Road =====
Outer Ring Road is another major artery in Delhi. The road which was almost neglected till the early 2000s is now an important highway that links far-flung areas of Delhi. The road is 6-8 lane and has grade-separators and a large number are under construction as a part of project to make the artery signal free. The road along with the ring road forms a ring which intersects all the National Highways passing through Delhi.

===== Expressways and National Highways =====
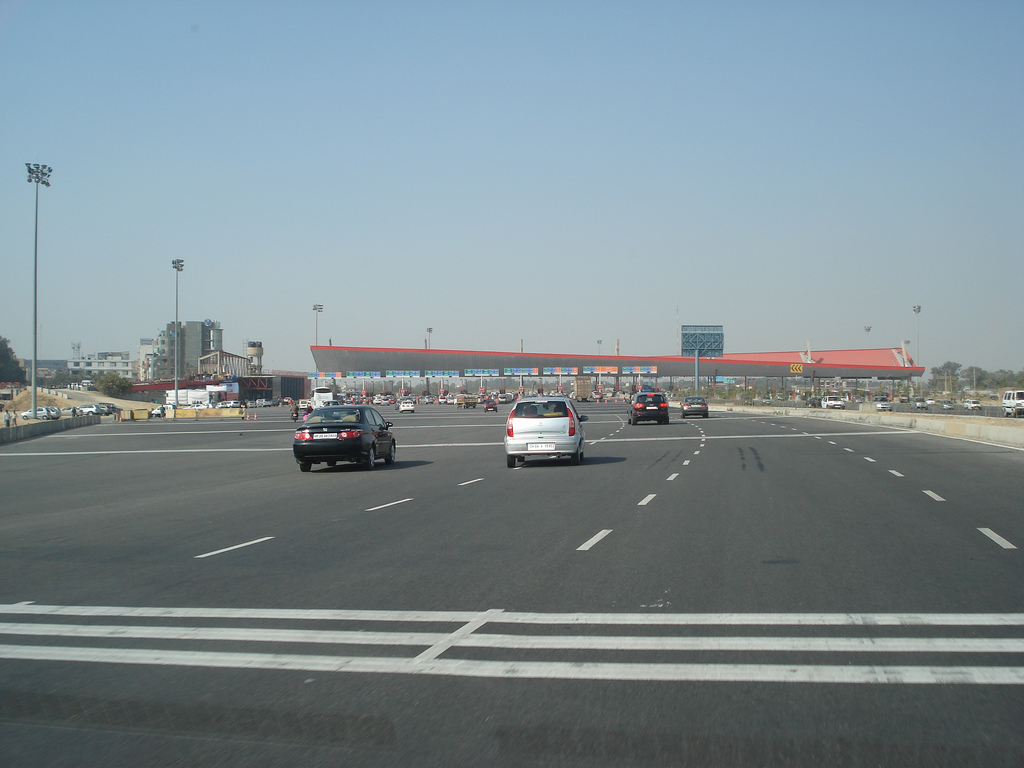
The 32-lane toll gate at National Highway 48 was the largest in Asia and third largest in the world until it was dismantled in June 2015

Delhi is connected by NH 1, NH 2, NH 8, NH 10 and NH 24. It also has three expressways (six- and eight-lane) that connect it with its suburbs. Delhi–Gurgaon Expressway connects Delhi with one of its financial hubs, Gurgaon, DND Flyway connects Delhi with its other financial hub, Noida and Delhi–Faridabad Skyway which connects Faridabad, major suburb to Delhi. Four more expressways are also planned.

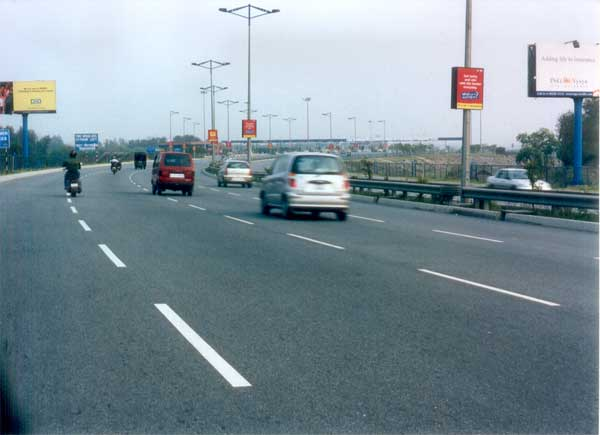
The DND Flyway

Noida–Greater Noida Expressway connects Noida with Greater Noida, which is an upcoming financial and commercial hub and is also to have a new Jewar International Airport. A 135.6-km long Western Peripheral Expressway, also known as the Kundli–Manesar–Palwal Expressway, which became operational on 19 November 2018, will relieve Delhi of the congestion of heavy night traffic and will act as a bypass for the night vehicles.

The DND–Faridabad–KMP Expressway connects the junction of DND Flyway and Ring Road at Maharani Bagh in Delhi with KMP Expressway at Khalilpur, Nuh district (near Sohna) in Haryana.

NH 24 or Ghaziabad Road is a four-lane national highway which connects Delhi to Lucknow via Ghaziabad. As the Commonwealth Village is located close by Yamuna bridge on this highway, underpasses and flyover being built will help facilitate traffic between the eastern areas of Delhi/ Western UP and the rest of the city.

=== Rail transport ===
Rail based transport in the city has started to gain popularity with the introduction of Delhi Metro. Ring-Railway, which runs parallel to the Ring-Road system is another rail-based intra-city transport facility in Delhi.

==== Metro Railway ====
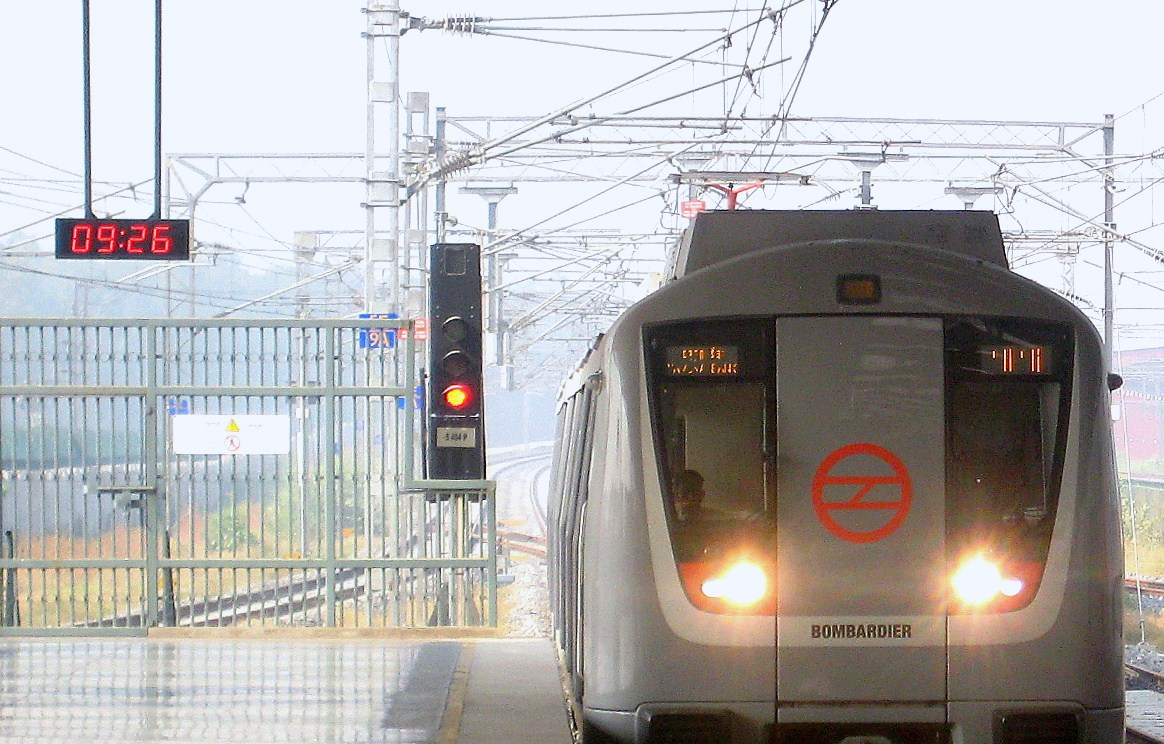
Delhi Metro – Phase 2 Delhi Metro Rail Corporation Picture Gallery

The Delhi Metro is being built in phases. Rapid increase of population coupled with large-scale immigration due to high economic growth has resulted in ever increasing demand for better transport, putting excessive pressure on the city's existent transport infrastructure. Like many other cities in the developing world, the city faces acute transport management problems leading to air pollution, congestion and resultant loss of productivity. In order to meet the transportation demand in Delhi, the State and Union government started the construction of a Mass Rapid Transit system, known as Delhi Metro in 1998. The project started commercial operations on 25 December 2002 between Shahdara and Tis Hazari) on the Red Line. It has set performance and efficiency standards and is continuously expanding. As of June 2025, the network consists of nine colour-coded regular lines along with the faster Airport Express line, with a total length of 374.466 kilometres (232.682 mi) serving 271 stations. The system has a mix of underground, at-grade, and elevated stations using both broad-gauge and standard-gauge. Phase IV (112.415 km) will be completed by the end of 2026, with the network totaling 462.841 km, making it longer than the London Underground.

Phase I consisted of 59 stations and 64.751 km (40.234 mi) of route length, of which 13.0 km (8.1 mi) is underground and 52.1 km (32.4 mi) surface or elevated. The inauguration of the Dwarka-Kakrola–Barakhamba Road corridor of the Blue Line marked the completion of Phase I in October 2006.

Phase II of the network consists of 123.3 km (76.6 mi) of route length and 86 stations, and is fully completed, with the first section opened in June 2008 and the last line opened in August 2011.

Phase III included eight extensions to existing lines, two ring lines (the Pink and Magenta Lines) and the Grey Line. It has 28 underground stations, three new lines and seven route extensions, totaling 162.375 kilometres (100.895 mi), at a cost of ₹410.079 billion (US$4.4 billion). The three new Phase III lines are the Pink Line on Inner Ring Road (Line 7), the Magenta Line on Outer Ring Road (Line 8) and the Grey Line connecting Dwarka and Najafgarh (Line 9).

Phase IV, with a length of 112.415 km (69.851 mi) and six lines, was finalized by the Government of Delhi in December 2018. Approval from the government of India was received for three priority corridors in March 2019. Construction of the corridors 65.1 km (40.5 mi) began on 30 December 2019, with an expected completion date of 2026. The metro's total length will exceed 450 kilometres (280 mi) at the end of Phase IV, not including other independently operated systems in the National Capital Region such as the 29.7-kilometre-long (18.5 mi) Aqua Line of the Noida-Greater Noida Metro and the 11.7-kilometre (7.3 mi) Rapid Metro Gurgaon which connect to the Delhi Metro.

Delhi Metro lines that operate as of June 2026:

Delhi Metro network
Line No.	Line Name	Opened	Last extension	Stations	Length (km)	Terminals		Rolling stock	Track gauge (mm)
1	Red Line	25 December 2002	9 March 2019	29	34.55	Shaheed Sthal (New Bus Adda)	Rithala	31 trains, 219 coaches	1676
2	Yellow Line	20 December 2004	10 November 2015	37	49.02	Samaypur Badli	Millennium City Centre Gurugram	54 trains, 429 coaches	1676
3	Blue Line	31 December 2005	9 March 2019	50	56.11	Noida Electronic City	Dwarka Sector 21	60 trains, 480 coaches	1676
4	Blue Line	7 January 2010	14 July 2011	8	8.51	Vaishali	Dwarka Sector 21	60 trains, 480 coaches	1676
5	Green Line	3 April 2010	24 June 2018	24	28.78	Inderlok	Brigadier Hoshiyar Singh	20 trains, 80 coaches	1435
5	Green Line	27 August 2011	–	24	28.78	Kirti Nagar	Brigadier Hoshiyar Singh	20 trains, 80 coaches	1435
6	Violet Line	3 October 2010	19 November 2018	34	46.34	Kashmere Gate	Raja Nahar Singh (Ballabhgarh)	37 trains, 220 coaches	1435
-	Airport Express Line	23 February 2011	17 September 2023	7	22.91	New Delhi	Yashobhoomi Dwarka Sector - 25	6 trains, 36 coaches	1435
7	Pink Line	14 March 2018	8 March 2026	46	73.49	Maujpur - Babarpur	Shiv Vihar	48 trains, 286 coaches	1435
8	Magenta Line	25 December 2017	5 January 2025	26	40.26	Botanical Garden	Krishna Park Extension	24 trains, 144 coaches	1435
8	Magenta Line	25 December 2017	8 March 2026	7	9.92	Deepali Chowk	Majlis Park	24 trains, 144 coaches	1435
9	Grey Line	4 October 2019	18 September 2021	4	5.19	Dwarka-Kakrola	Dhansa Bus Stand	3 trains, 17 coaches	1435
Total				245 (25 double, 1 triple transfer)	374.47	-	-	307 trains, 2055 coaches	-

Map of the Delhi Metro network

==== Ring & Suburban Railway ====
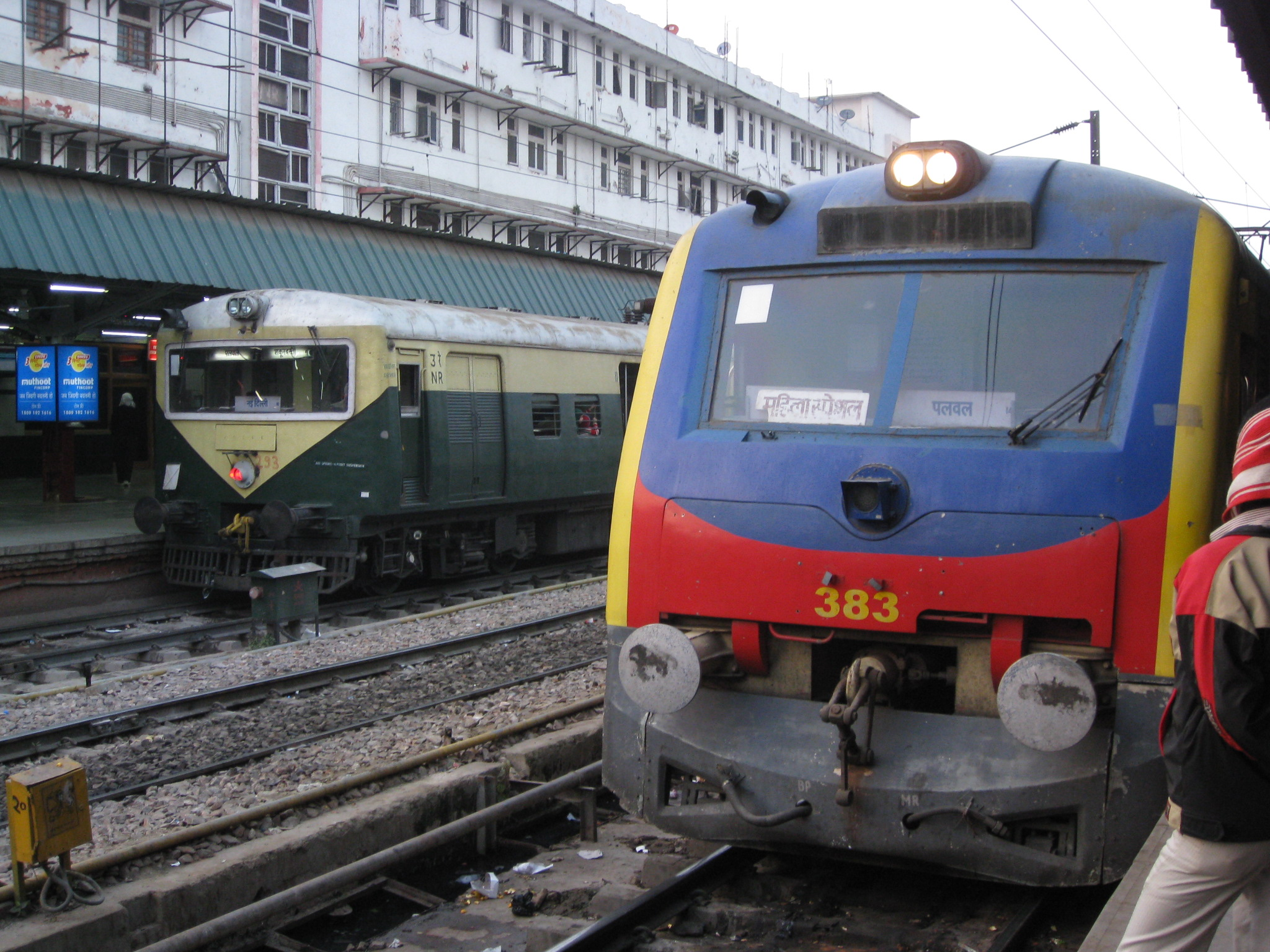
Delhi Suburban Railway trains

Ring railway is a 35-kilometre circular railway network in Delhi that runs parallel to the Ring Road. It was laid back in 1975 primarily to service freight trains that could bypass the crowded and passenger-heavy Old Delhi and New Delhi railway stations. The network was upgraded for the 1982 Asian Games with the introduction of 24 additional services. Its circular route is 35 km (22 mi) long, which the trains takes 90–120 minutes to complete, both clockwise and anti-clockwise, via the Hazrat Nizamuddin Railway Station. The ring railway service was quite popular through the 80s and 90s when Delhi's transport infrastructure was just gathering pace, but since then, with the rapid expansion of the Delhi Metro coupled with an extensive bus network, the ring railway has remained neglected by the city as well as the Railways. On average, only 3700 passengers take the trains every day. The biggest reason for the failure of the railway is a lack of a feeder network, such as approach roads and feeder buses to the stations. The stations are situated at remote locations and are difficult to access by passengers. There is also a problem of security as many stations have been encroached. The trains on this network also run behind schedule most of the time. The network is now utilized as a freight corridor and limited passenger train services are available during peak hours.

== Inter-state transport ==
=== Railway connectivity ===
Delhi is connected to whole of the nation through Indian Railways vast network. New Delhi Railway Station which is one of the busiest stations in Indian Railway system serves as headquarters of Northern Railways. A large load of inter-state transport is borne by railways. A large number of local passenger trains connect Delhi to its sub-urban areas and thus provide convenient travel for daily commuters. Railways also share a large amount of freight traffic in Delhi.

==== Train Services ====
Regular train services available from railway stations in the city. The services are extended to all the states in the country. Services are provided by the national railway operator Indian Railways. The 5 railway stations in the city are:

- New Delhi Railway Station, Paharganj & Ajmeri Gate, Central Delhi district
- Delhi Junction, Mori Gate, Central Delhi district
- Hazrat Nizamuddin Railway Station, Nizamuddin East, South East Delhi district
- Delhi Sarai Rohilla Railway Station, Sarai Rohilla, Central Delhi district
- Anand Vihar Terminal Railway Station, Anand Vihar, Shahdara district

==== Regional Rapid Transport System (RRTS/RapidX) ====
- Sarai kale khan-Meerut RRTS (partially operational)
- Sarai kale khan-Panipat RRTS (under construction)
- Sarai kale khan-Gurugram-Alwar RRTS (under construction)

=== Road ===
==== Highways ====
The city is believed to have the highest road density in the country and is well connected to the rest of the nation through five major national highways, namely NH 1, NH 2, NH 8, NH 10 and NH 24. The highways around city are being upgraded into expressways with ultra-modern facilities.

==== Bus services ====
Regular bus services are available from interstate bus terminals in the city. The services are extended to all the northern states and the neighbouring areas of Delhi. Services are provided by state transport corporations and several private operators.

Delhi Transport Infrastructure Development Corporation Limited (DTIDC) operates 3 major Inter-State Bus Terminals (ISBT):

- Existing
  - Maharana Pratap Inter State Bus Terminus at Kashmere Gate in central Delhi.
  - Swami Vivekanand Inter State Bus Terminus at Anand Vihar east of Yamuna river in East Delhi.
  - Sarai Kale Khan Inter-State Bus Terminus at Sarai Kale Khan in South East Delhi.
- Proposed and approved by Delhi Govt and Delhi Leutinant General (listed north to south)
  - Narela Inter State Bus Terminus, planned in North Delhi in 100,000 sqm area at NH48 GT Road to Sonepat-Ambala. As of October 2024, DDC is identifying suitable land to handover to DTIDC. Buses from Punjab and Haryana along the GT Road will terminate here instead of the Kashmiri Gate ISBT.
  - Tikri Inter State Bus Terminus, planned in West Delhi adjacent to the Tikri Border metro station on NH9 Delhi-Hisar Highway, it is nearly 4 km east of Bahadurgarh Bypass ISBT of Haryana Roadways. The PWD department has agreed to handover the required 29,500 sqm land to the DTIC in October 2024, and buses from Haryana from Tikri Border and Singhu Border will terminate here instead of Kashmiri Gate ISBT.
  - Dwarka Inter State Bus Terminus (under-construction in 2022 on 27 acres) at Urban Extension Road-II opposite Dwarka Sector 21 metro station in South Delhi. DTIDC already owns the required 27 acre land around which a new boundary wall already exists and DMRC has been appointed consultant in October 2024, construction which was expected to commence in 2022 is being expedited in late 2024. This ISBT, costing Rs4,700 cr and based on Mixed-use transit-oriented development as multimodal transport will be largest than the 3 existing ISBTs in Delhi which are running above the planned capacity. 60% of the area will have the high-density 2,29,000 sq m affordable housing, 20% commercial area of 65,000 sq m and ISBT depot of 27,000 sq m, 100% or 50,000 sq m for public amenities, the rest for passenger services and bus operations. Planned with future needs for the nxt 25 years, it will generate revenue of Rs5,100, including Rs3,700 cr from housing and Rs 1,400 cr from commercial. The project was revived in 2026, and the DPR was being prepared in April 2026.
- Proposed, pending various approvals
  - Aerocity Inter State Bus Terminus (Aerocity ISBT), adjacent to the Aerocity metro station near Terminal-1 of IGI in South Delhi, proposed in 2023.

=== Airports ===
Indira Gandhi International Airport (IGI) serves Delhi for both domestic and international connections, and is situated in the southwestern corner of the city, alongside Delhi-Gurgaon Expressway. In the year 2024–25, IGI recorded a traffic of 77,280,234 passengers. Being the busiest airport in the South Asian region, IGI airport has three terminals - Terminal 1 & Terminal 2 for domestic operations only and Terminal 3 - with mixed use i.e. primarily International and the rest of the domestic operations(Air India, Air India Express, and select flights of SpiceJet and IndiGo) - in addition to T1 & T2

The airport is witnessing massive expansion and modernisation by a consortium led by GMR Infra. The new Terminal T3 was inaugurated in 2010 in line with the historic Commonwealth Games being held in the city and today, IGI is India's busiest airport and the ninth busiest airport in the world. Terminals 4, 5 and 6 will be built in a phased manner.

Hindon Domestic Airport in Ghaziabad was inaugurated by Prime Minister Narendra Modi as the second airport for the Delhi-NCR Region on the 8 March 2019.

Apart from the expanded IGI airport, Delhi will also receive a second international airport by 2025. The airport, being named as Noida International Airport, is being built in Jewar in Greater Noida. It will be around 75 km from IGI airport.

== East-west connectivity bridges ==
=== Yamuna bridges in Delhi ===
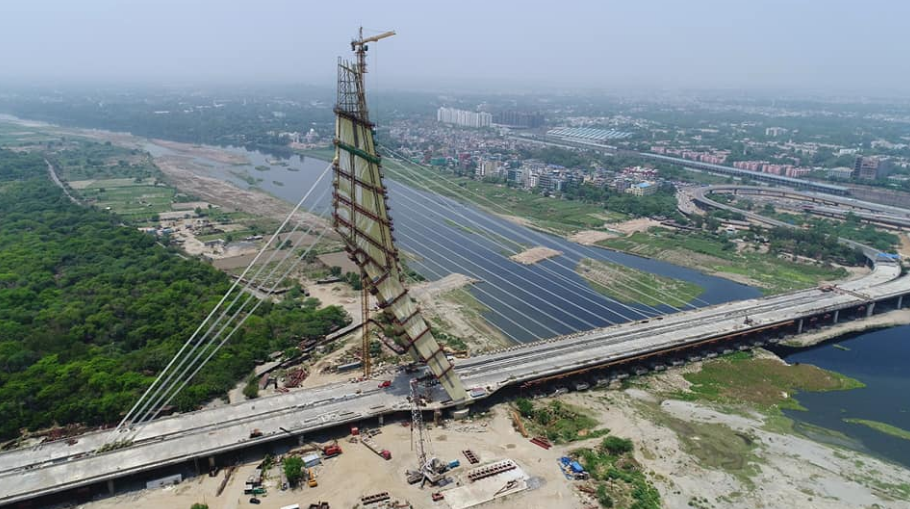
Signature Bridge on Yamuna river is the tallest structure in Delhi

The total length of the Yamuna inside Delhi is 22 km from the Wazirabad barrage to the Okhla barrage. This stretch of the river has 14 bridges (nine of them for road traffic), including those built by Delhi Metro (4) and Indian Railways (1). 4 bridges are under construction — 1 for road traffic and 3 for rail traffic.

- Road Bridges
  - Old Wazirabad bridge (barrage-cum-bridge)
  - Signature Bridge
  - Yudhishthir Setu
  - Rajghat/Geeta Colony bridge
  - Old ITO bridge, Vikas Marg (barrage-cum-bridge)
  - New Nizamuddin Bridge
  - DND Flyway
  - Okhla barrage bridge
  - Barapullah Phase-III extension (under construction)
- Road-Rail Bridges
  - Old Yamuna Bridge (Lohe-ka-Pul)
- Rail bridges
  - Delhi Metro
    - Kashmere Gate to Shastri Park (Red Line)
    - Indraprastha to Yamuna Bank (Blue Line)
    - Nizamuddin to Mayur Vihar (Pink Line)
    - Kalindi Kunj to Okhla Bird Sanctuary (Magenta Line)
    - Jagatpur to Sonia Vihar (Pink Line)
  - Indian Railways
    - New Yamuna Bridge
  - Delhi-Meerut RRTS
    - Nizamuddin to New Ashok Vihar

=== Other bridges in NCR ===
- IIT Flyover

== Future projects ==
There are many transport infrastructure projects underway in Delhi. They are listed below -

=== Rail ===
- Upgrading of New Delhi and Old Delhi railway stations of Northern Railways.
- Phase 4 expansion of Delhi Metro.
- Introduction of Delhi Metroneo, a metrolite system.
- A proposal to re-introduce Trams in the Chandni Chowk and Red Fort areas of the city.
- A proposed high-speed rail link that would link New Delhi with Kunming, China via Myanmar

=== Road ===
- Two upcoming bridges over Yamuna will connect Faridabad to Noida and Greater Noida. One of the bridges would connect Faridabad-Noida-Ghaziabad (FNG) expressway from Noida's Sector 150 to National Highway 1 in Faridabad. The other bridge is proposed to link Noida's Sector 168 with Faridabad's Badoli village (Near Bypass Road) Government has already approved construction of the road connecting Faridabad and Greater Noida that will improve the connectivity with clearances received from both Haryana and Uttar Pradesh Governments The much-awaited FNG (Faridabad-Noida-Ghaziabad Expressway) is finally coming on track and will provide fast connectivity to daily commuters of the area once complete; apart from this, it is also emerging as an excellent stretch for real estate development. FNG Expressway is around 56 km long with 19.9 km in Noida–Greater Noida region, 8 km in Ghaziabad, while the rest 28.1 km is in the Faridabad region, especially the developing sectors of Neharpar Faridabad or Greater Faridabad. According to the plan, FNG from Noida side will become operational in the next 14 months while it would take three years for the whole stretch to become fully operational. The completed expressway designed by IIT-Roorkee will offer commuters direct connectivity between Noida and Greater Faridabad

=== Air ===
- Revamp of IGI Airport is underway to improve its infrastructure, passenger capacity and efficiency.
- Noida International Airport in Gautam Budhh Nagar district will start operations in 2025.

== Delhi Traffic Police transport helpline ==
Owing to a large number of complaints from consumers, the Delhi Government in association with Delhi Traffic Police runs a staffed transport helpline which can be reached at 011-23010101 while dialing from within the city. Citizens can make traffic related complaints and suggestions. One can also report traffic violations observed and misbehavior/refusal/overcharging by autorickshaws, buses and taxis.

== See also ==
- Transport in India
- Bus rapid transit (BRT)
- Clean development mechanism
- Delhi Metro
- Delhi Transport Corporation
- Highways passing from Delhi
