= Uttam Nagar =

- suburb
- Location in India
- Coordinates: 28°38′0″N 77°4′30″E
- Country: India
- State: National Capital Territory of Delhi
- District: West Delhi

Government
  - Body: Municipal Corporation of Delhi

Population
  - Total: 182,171

Languages
- Time zone: UTC+5:30 (IST)
- PIN: 110059
- Telephone code: 011
- Lok Sabha constituency: Delhi
- Civic agency: Municipal Corporation of Delhi

Uttam Nagar is a suburb situated in West Delhi. Uttam Nagar has the Pincode 110059. Uttam Nagar mainly consists of several sub towns that are completely urbanized. Since the advent of the Delhi Metro in the area, the population has increased much faster here. The proximity with Metro, Airport and Gurgaon makes this area special. It was acquired on the lands of the Hastsal Village.

== Metro connectivity ==
Delhi Metro's Blue Line (Dwarka Sector-21-Vaishali/Noida City Center) which starts from Dwarka, connects Uttam Nagar to Connaught Place, Pragati Maidan, Anand Vihar ISBT and Vaishali. The line is being extended to the Airport via Dwarka. Uttam Nagar has mainly Four Metro Stations named Dwarka Mor, Nawada, Uttam Nagar East and Uttam Nagar West.

== Other modes of transport ==
In all parts, cycle rickshaws and auto rickshaws can be found easily which usually take 20 rupees per head. E-Rickshaws (Motor-powered low-height 4-seater rickshaws) are very common these days which run in fixed routes at cheap fares on a sharing basis, usually takes 15 rupees per head. Gramin Sewa Autos ply on main Road from Dwarka Mor to Uttam Nagar East.

== Notable people ==
- Virat Kohli, Cricketer
- Neha Kakkar, Singer
- Sandeep Rajora, actor
- Chetan Bhagat, author

== Points of interest ==
- Potter's Colony, Kumhar Colony.
- Mini Qutub Minar in Hastsal Village.
- The Shikargah (hunting lodge) of Shri Prithviraj Chauhan in Hastsal Village.
- An old Peer Baba Mazaar in Bindapur Village.
- Silailor (An Online Platform For Doorstep Tailoring)
- Arya Samaj Road (Fashion Street)
- Kali Ghata (50 plus years old sweet shop)
- Hastsal Road [Wholesale]] Kiryana Market.
- Shukkar Bazar Retail Market & weekly Market.
- Bindapur Road Nanhey Park Wholesale Kiryana Market
- Taured Amusement Park
