= District Centres of Delhi =

The National Capital Territory of Delhi has 11 administrative districts. Below is a list of the various District centres of Delhi:

== South Delhi ==
- Nehru Place
- Saket District Centre

== East Delhi ==
- Laxmi Nagar

== Central Delhi ==
- Jhandewalan
- Rajendra Place

== North West Delhi ==
- Manglam Place (Rohini)
- Netaji Subhash Place (Pitampura; Shakurpur; Wazirpur)

== West Delhi ==
- Janakpuri
- Shivaji Place (Rajouri Garden)

== See also ==
Districts of Delhi
