= Subhash Nagar metro station (Delhi) =

Metro station in Delhi, India

Subhash Nagar

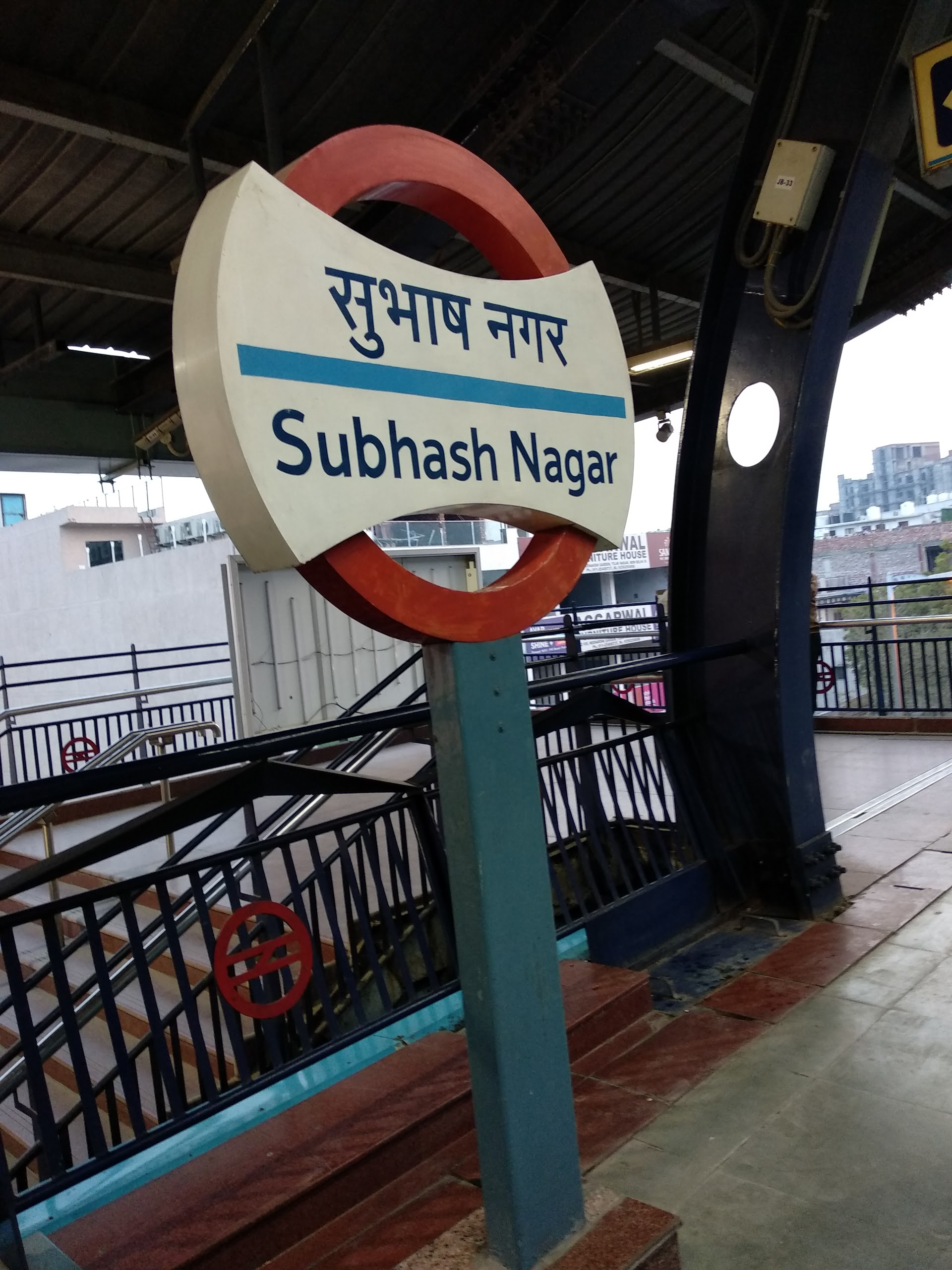

General information
- Location: Najafgarh Rd, Meenakshi Garden/Ashok Nagar, New Delhi, 110018
- Coordinates: 28°38′25″N 77°06′18″E
- System: Delhi Metro station
- Owner: Delhi Metro
- Operator: Delhi Metro Rail Corporation (DMRC)
- Line: Blue Line
- Platforms: Side platform; Platform-1 → Noida Electronic City / Vaishali; Platform-2 → Dwarka Sector 21
- Tracks: 2

Construction
- Structure type: Elevated, double-track
- Platform levels: 2
- Parking: Available
- Accessible: Yes

Other information
- Status: Staffed, Operational
- Station code: SN

History
- Opened: 31 December 2005; 20 years ago
- Electrified: 25 kV 50 Hz AC through overhead catenary

Passengers
- Jan 2015: 18,782/day 582,235/ Month average

Services
Preceding station	Delhi Metro	Following station
Tilak Nagar towards Dwarka Sector 21	Blue Line	Tagore Garden towards Noida Electronic City or Vaishali
Route map
Location

Subhash Nagar is a metro station located on the Blue Line of the Delhi Metro.

== Location ==
Subhash Nagar is a place in New Delhi, surrounded by Mayapuri, Rajouri Garden and Tagore Garden on the east, Ashok Nagar, Tilak Nagar and Janakpuri on the west, and Hari Nagar on the south. Other containing and neighbouring localities including Maya Enclave, Hari Enclave, Vikrant Enclave, Beriwala Bagh, Ajay Enclave, Meenakshi Garden, Manak Vihar, and Khayala.

Subhash Nagar is a part of Hari Nagar Assembly constituency and West Delhi Lok Sabha constituency.

== History and culture ==
Subhash Nagar is originally a refugee colony with people who migrated from West Punjab, Sindh and Northwest Frontier Province. It has also seen recent migration from Uttarakhand, Rajasthan, West Bengal, East Punjab and South India. The PIN code of Subhash Nagar is 110027.

== Station layout ==
L2	Side platform | Doors will open on the left
L2	Platform 1 Eastbound	Towards → Noida Electronic City / Vaishali; Next Station: Tagore Garden
L2	Platform 2 Westbound	Towards ← Dwarka Sector 21; Next Station: Tilak Nagar
L2	Side platform | Doors will open on the left
L1	Concourse	Fare control, station agent, Metro Card vending machines, crossover
G	Street Level	Exit/Entrance

== Commercial places ==
There are shopping malls in Subhash Nagar such as Pacific Mall, Ajanta Mall & Multiplexes, where Ajanta Movie Theatre, a local cinema is situated in Ajay Enclave Extension, which is adjacent to Ajay Enclave, a residential colony under the Subhash Nagar jurisdiction.

== See also ==
- Delhi
- List of Delhi Metro stations
- Transport in Delhi
- Delhi Metro Rail Corporation
- Delhi Suburban Railway
- Delhi Monorail
- Delhi Transport Corporation
- West Delhi
- New Delhi
- National Capital Region (India)
- List of rapid transit systems
- List of metro systems
