= Nangli metro station =

Metro station in Delhi, India

Nangli

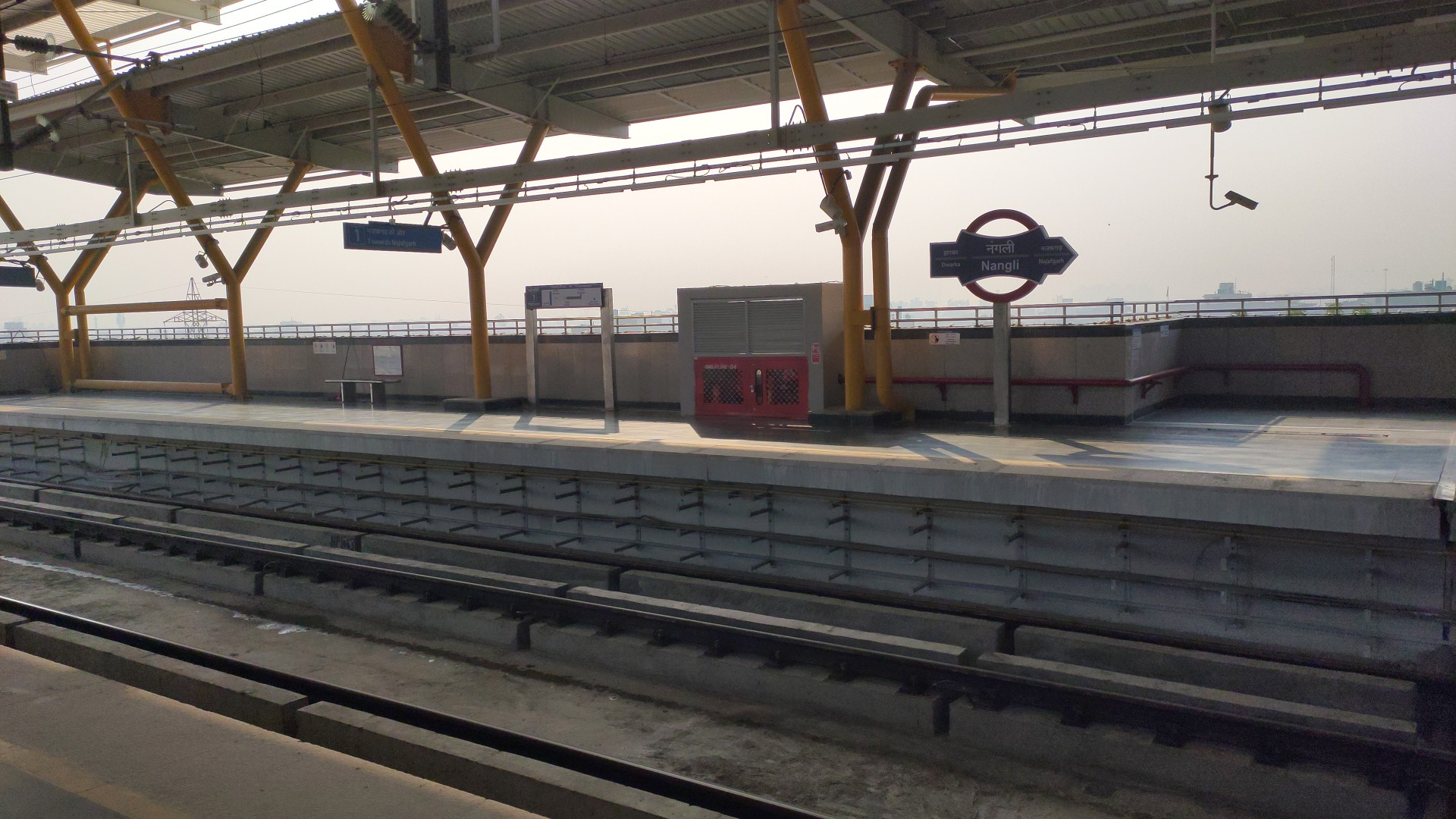

General information
- Location: Najafgarh Road, Nangli Sakrawati, New Delhi, Delhi 110043 India
- Coordinates: 28.617239°N 77.0104°E
- System: Delhi Metro station
- Owner: Delhi Metro
- Line: Grey Line
- Platforms: Side platform; Platform-1 → Dhansa Bus Stand; Platform-2 → Dwarka-Kakrola
- Tracks: 2

Construction
- Structure type: Elevated
- Platform levels: 2

Other information
- Station code: NNGI

History
- Opened: 4 October 2019; 7 years ago
- Electrified: 25 kV 50 Hz AC through overhead catenary

Services
Preceding station	Delhi Metro	Following station
Najafgarh towards Dhansa Bus Stand	Grey Line	Dwarka-Kakrola Terminus
Route map
Location

Nangli is an elevated metro station on the Grey Line of the Delhi Metro, located in the Nangli Sakrawati area of South-West Delhi. It commenced passenger operations on 4 October 2019 as part of the Dwarka–Najafgarh corridor, developed under Phase III of the Delhi Metro expansion.

== Station layout ==
Station layout
Level	Layout	Facilities
L2	Side platform	Platform 1 towards Dhansa Bus Stand; Platform 2 towards Dwarka
L1	Concourse	Fare control, station agent, Metro Card vending machines, crossover
G	Street level	Exit/Entrance

== Entry/Exit ==
Nangli metro station entry/exits
Gate No. 1	Gate No. 2
Arjun Park, Indira Park, Anand Vihar, Nangli Sakrawati	Ranaji Enclave, Sainik Enclave

== Connectivity ==
The station is served by nearby DTC and cluster bus stops, with routes including 764, 817 and 835 providing connectivity to various parts of Delhi. E-rickshaws are also available in the vicinity for local transportation. Nearby landmarks include the Nangli Sakrawati industrial area, the Delhi Metro's Najafgarh Depot and the Sai Baba Mandir in Najafgarh. The surrounding residential localities include Nangli Sakrawati, Nangli Dairy, Nangli Vihar, Arjun Park, Ranaji Enclave, Jemini Park and Indra Park.

== See also ==
- List of Delhi Metro stations
- Transport in Delhi
- Delhi Metro Rail Corporation
- Delhi Suburban Railway
