= Mystery Man =

Mystery Man may refer to:

== Film and television ==
- The Mystery Man (film), a 1935 American film directed by Ray McCarey
- Mystery Man (film), a 1944 Hopalong Cassidy Western directed by George Archainbaud
- "Mystery Man", a 2009 episode of the American TV series Cougar Town
- "Mystery Man", an episode of the television series The Crown

== Music ==
- The Mystery Man, a 1990 album by jazz pianist Mike Garson
- "Mystery Man", a song by The Outfield on the 1985 album Play Deep
- "Mystery Man", a song on the 1976 album Tom Petty and the Heartbreakers by Tom Petty and the Heartbreakers

== Other uses ==
- Mystery Man, a 1991 novel by Lisa Jackson
- The Mystery Man, a 2000 children's book by Margaret Ryan
- John Zegrus, the name on a counterfeit passport of a man, nicknamed the "Mystery Man" by the Japanese press, arrested in Japan in 1960 for document fraud

== See also ==
- The Man of Mystery, a 1917 American drama film
- "Man of Mystery", a 1960 single by The Shadows
- Mystery Men, a 1999 American superhero comedy film
- Mystery Men Comics, an American anthology comic book series published by Fox Feature Syndicate that ran from 1939 to 1942
- W.D. Gaster, a character from the video game Undertale
