= Nangli Sakrawati =

Nangli Sakrawati Village
- Village
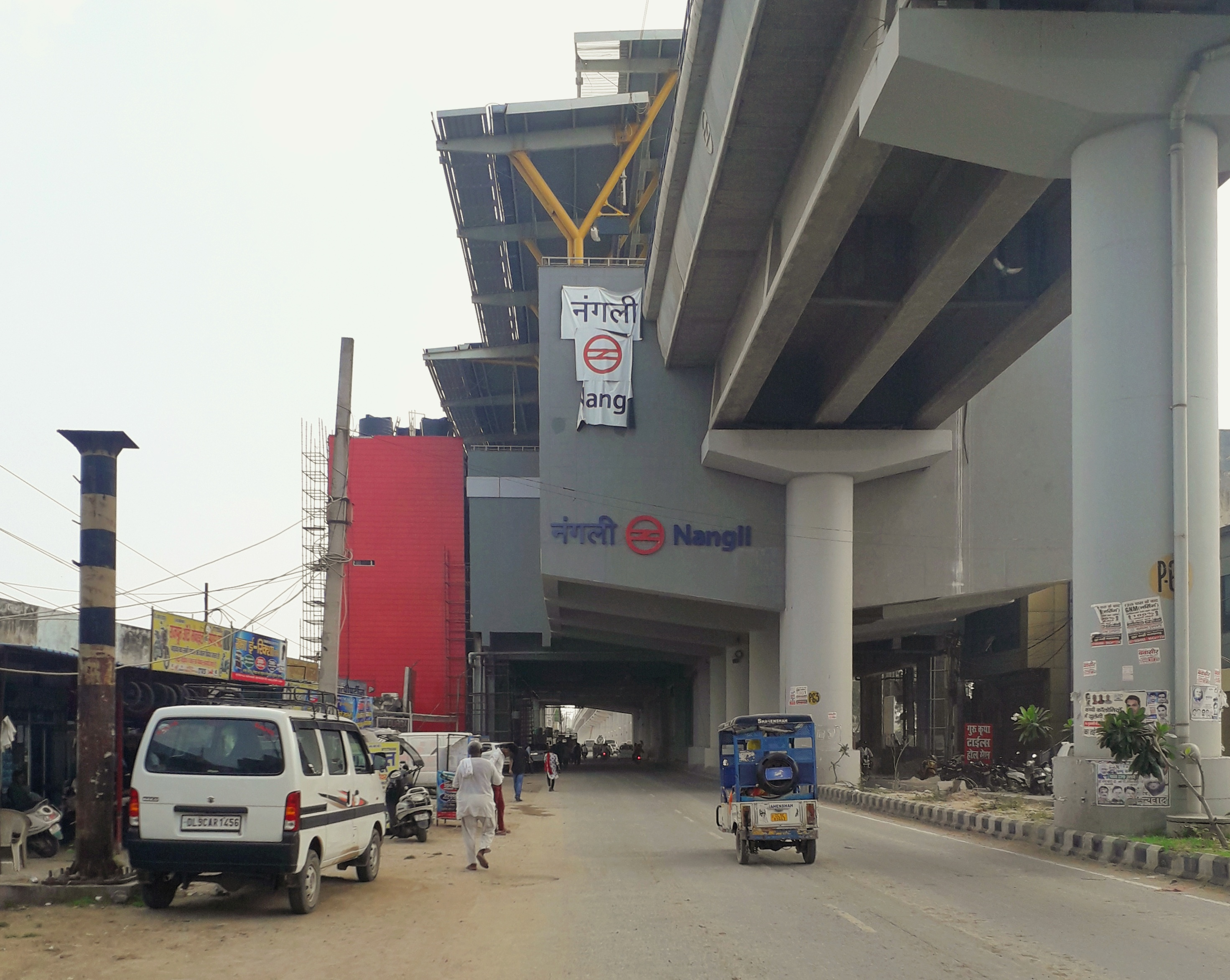
- Nangli metro station in Nangli Sakrawati Village (Delhi)

- Location in Delhi, India Nangli Sakrawati Village (India)
- Country: India
- Union Territory: Delhi
- District: South West Delhi

Government
  - Type: Municipal Corporation
  - Body: Municipal Corporation of Delhi

Languages
  - Official: Hindi, Haryanvi, English
- Time zone: UTC+5:30 (IST)
- PIN: 110043
- Telephone code: 011

Nangli Sakrawati is a village on the outskirts of Najafgarh in South West Delhi district of the National Capital Territory of Delhi, India. The nearest metro is Nangli metro station in Grey line of Delhi metro. Nangli Sakrawati was settled some 800 years ago by people who came from Narinara village in Haryana

== History ==
Nangli Sakrawati was settled some 800 years ago by people who came from Narinara village in Haryana. Sugarcane was sown in abundance in the village, which was then converted locally into 'shakkar' (sugar), hence giving it the name 'sakrawati'. A local saint 'Dada Rana Ji' once came and preached people here. A temple was erected in his memory now known as Dada Rana ji ka Mandir (Temple of Dada Rana ji). By 1970's, the Delhi Government had seized bulk of land belonging to the village in order to create embankments along the Najafgarh Drain, as well as for setting up the Nangli Dairy. A number of residential colonies were established in the decades following. An Industrial area too exists north of the village.

== Geography ==
Nangli Sakrawati is located at 28.6199°N 77.0059°E. The village extends from Najafgarh Drain in the east to Dichaon Kalan in the West.

== Population ==
Nangli Sakrawati village has a population of 37,706 according to the 2011 Census of India. There exist 7,410 houses in the village. Literacy rate of the village is 85.17%.
