= Dwarka Mor metro station =

Metro station in Delhi, India

Dwarka Mor द्वारका मोड़

General information
- Location: B-Block, Nangli Dairy Extn. Ph-II, 110043, Dwaraka Mor, Bhagwati Garden, Baprola, New Delhi, Delhi 110066
- Coordinates: 28°37′09″N 77°02′00″E
- System: Delhi Metro station
- Owner: Delhi Metro
- Operator: Delhi Metro Rail Corporation (DMRC)
- Line: Blue Line
- Platforms: Side platform; Platform-1 → Noida Electronic City / Vaishali; Platform-2 → Dwarka Sector 21
- Tracks: 2

Construction
- Structure type: Elevated, Double-track
- Platform levels: 2
- Parking: Available
- Accessible: Yes

Other information
- Station code: DM

History
- Opened: 31 December 2005; 20 years ago
- Electrified: 25 kV 50 Hz AC through overhead catenary

Passengers
- Jan 2015: 9,253/day 1,151,993/ Month Average

Services
Preceding station	Delhi Metro	Following station
Dwarka-Kakrola towards Dwarka Sector 21	Blue Line	Nawada towards Noida Electronic City or Vaishali
Route map
Location

Dwarka Mor is an elevated metro station on the Blue Line of the Delhi Metro, located in the Dwarka area of South-West Delhi. It commenced operations on 31 December 2005 as part of the Barakhamba Road–Dwarka corridor, which formed part of Phase I of the Delhi Metro network. The station provides metro access to nearby educational institutions, including Netaji Subhas University of Technology (NSUT) and Deen Dayal Upadhyaya College.

== The station ==
=== Station layout ===
L2	Side platform | Doors will open on the left
L2	Platform 1 Eastbound	Towards → Noida Electronic City / Vaishali; Next Station: Nawada
L2	Platform 2 Westbound	Towards ← Dwarka Sector 21; Next Station: Dwarka-Kakrola Change at the next station for Grey Line
L2	Side platform | Doors will open on the left
L1	Concourse	Fare control, station agent, Metro Card vending machines, crossover
G	Street Level	Exit/Entrance

=== Facilities ===
The available ATM list at Dwarka Mor metro station is Ratnakar Bank and Federal Bank.

== Entry/Exit ==
Dwarka Mor metro station Entry/exits
Gate No-1	Gate No-2
Rama Park Bhagwati Garden Extension Nawada Housing Complex Jain Road Diwan Estate	Sewak Park Netaji Subhas University of Technology Mansaram Park

== Connections ==
=== Bus ===
Delhi Transport Corporation bus routes number 724EXT, 816A, 816EXT, 817, 817A, 817B, 818, 819, 822, 824, 824SSTL, 824STL, 825, 826, 827, 828, 829, 832LinkSTL, 833, 834, 835, 836, 845, 872, 873, 876, 878, 883A, 887, 891STL serves the station from outside metro station stop.

== Gallery ==
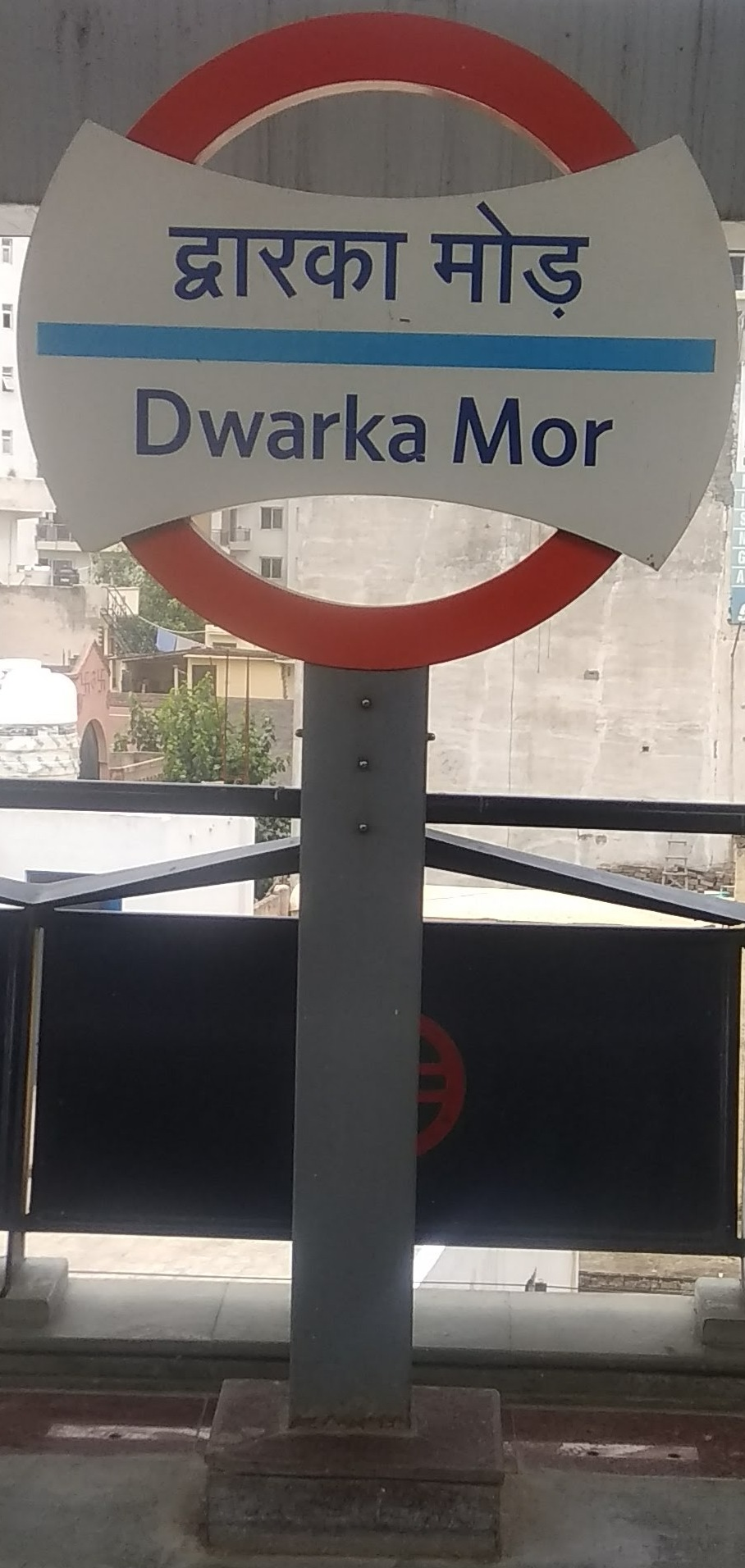
Dwarka Mor metro signboard

== See also ==
- Delhi
- List of Delhi Metro stations
- Transport in Delhi
- Delhi Metro Rail Corporation
- Delhi Suburban Railway
- Delhi Monorail
- Delhi Transport Corporation
- West Delhi
- New Delhi
- Dwarka, Delhi
- National Capital Region (India)
- List of rapid transit systems
- List of metro systems
