= Janakpuri West metro station =

Metro station in Delhi, India

Janakpuri West जनकपुरी पश्चिम

General information
- Location: Shivaji Marg, Janakpuri District Center, Janakpuri, New Delhi, 110058
- Coordinates: 28°37′46″N 77°04′42″E
- System: Delhi Metro station
- Owner: Delhi Metro
- Operator: Delhi Metro Rail Corporation (DMRC)
- Line: Blue Line Magenta Line
- Platforms: Side platform Platform-1 → Noida Electronic City/Vaishali; Platform-2 → Dwarka Sector 21; Island platform Platform-3 → Botanical Garden; Platform-4 → Krishna Park Extension
- Tracks: 4

Construction
- Structure type: Elevated (Blue Line); Underground (Magenta Line)
- Platform levels: 2
- Parking: Multi-Level Parking in Metro's Unity One Mall
- Accessible: Yes

Other information
- Station code: JPW

History
- Opened: 31 December 2005; 20 years ago (Blue Line); 29 May 2018; 8 years ago (Magenta line)
- Electrified: 25 kV 50 Hz AC through overhead catenary

Passengers
- Jan 2015: 21,262/day 659,120/ Month average

Services
Preceding station	Delhi Metro	Following station
Uttam Nagar East towards Dwarka Sector 21	Blue Line	Janakpuri East towards Noida Electronic City or Vaishali
Krishna Park Extension Terminus	Magenta Line	Dabri Mor - Janakpuri South towards Botanical Garden
Route map
Location

The Janakpuri West metro station is an interchange station between the Blue Line and Magenta Line of Delhi Metro.

== History ==
=== Phase III ===
Under Phase III, Janakpuri West became an interchange station between the existing Blue Line and the newly constructed Magenta Line (Janakpuri West–Botanical Garden). The Magenta Line provides connectivity to South Delhi and Noida, passing through Terminal 1 of Indira Gandhi International Airport, Hauz Khas and Kalkaji Mandir.

The section was inaugurated on 28 May 2018 by Delhi Chief Minister Arvind Kejriwal and Union Minister for Housing and Urban Affairs Hardeep Singh Puri. Commercial operations commenced on 29 May 2018.

=== India's Highest Escalators ===
The Magenta Line section of Janakpuri West station features escalators with a vertical rise of 15.65 metres, making them the highest-elevation escalators in the Delhi Metro network at the time of installation. They surpassed the 14.575 metres (47.82 ft) escalators at Kashmere Gate metro station. Each escalator has a horizontal length of 35.32 metres (115.9 ft) and weighs approximately 26 tonnes. A 250-tonne crane was brought in for their installation. The vertical rise is equivalent to the height of a five-storey building.

== Station layout ==
P	Side platform | Doors will open on the left
P	Platform 1 Eastbound	Towards → Noida Electronic City / Vaishali; Next Station: Janakpuri East
P	Platform 2 Westbound	Towards ← Dwarka Sector 21; Next Station: Uttam Nagar East
P	Side platform | Doors will open on the left
UC	Upper Concourse	Fare collection gates, station agent, Ticket vending machines
G	Street level	Exit/Entrance
G		Fare collection gates, station agent, Ticket vending machines
LC	Lower Concourse	Fare collection gates, station agent, Ticket vending machines
P	Platform 3 Eastbound	Towards → Botanical Garden; Next Station: Dabri Mor - Janakpuri South
P	Island platform | Doors will open on the right
P	Platform 4 Westbound	Towards ← Krishna Park Extension Train Terminus

=== Facilities ===
Facilities: Escalators are available on both sides of the station for upward movement.

Nearby attractions: Janak Palace Shopping Complex, INOX (formerly Satyam Cineplex), Sagar Ratna restaurant and Piccadilly Hotel (formerly Hotel Hilton). The station also serves the nearby residential area of Vikaspuri.

== Connections ==
Janakpuri West metro station serves as an interchange between Blue Line and Magenta Line of the Delhi Metro.

=== Bus ===
Delhi Transport Corporation bus routes number 588, 810, 813, 813CL, 816, 816A, 816EXT, 817, 817A, 817B, 818, 819, 822, 823, 824, 824SSTL, 825, 826, 827, 828, 829, 833, 834, 835, 836, 838, 838A, 845, 847, 861A, 871, 871A, 872, 873, 876, 878, 891STL, 972A, 972BSPL and By Pass Express serve the station.

== Gallery ==
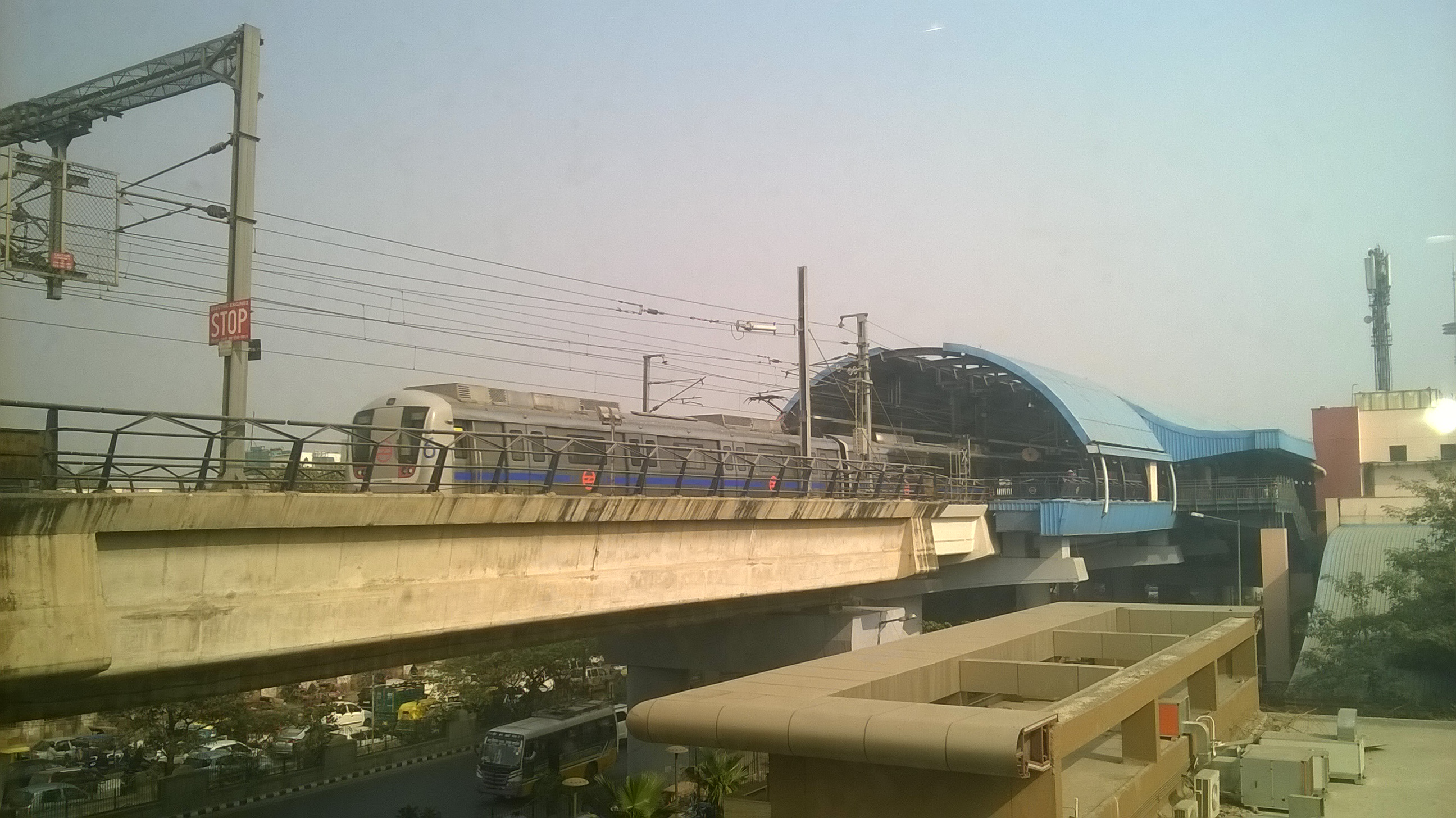
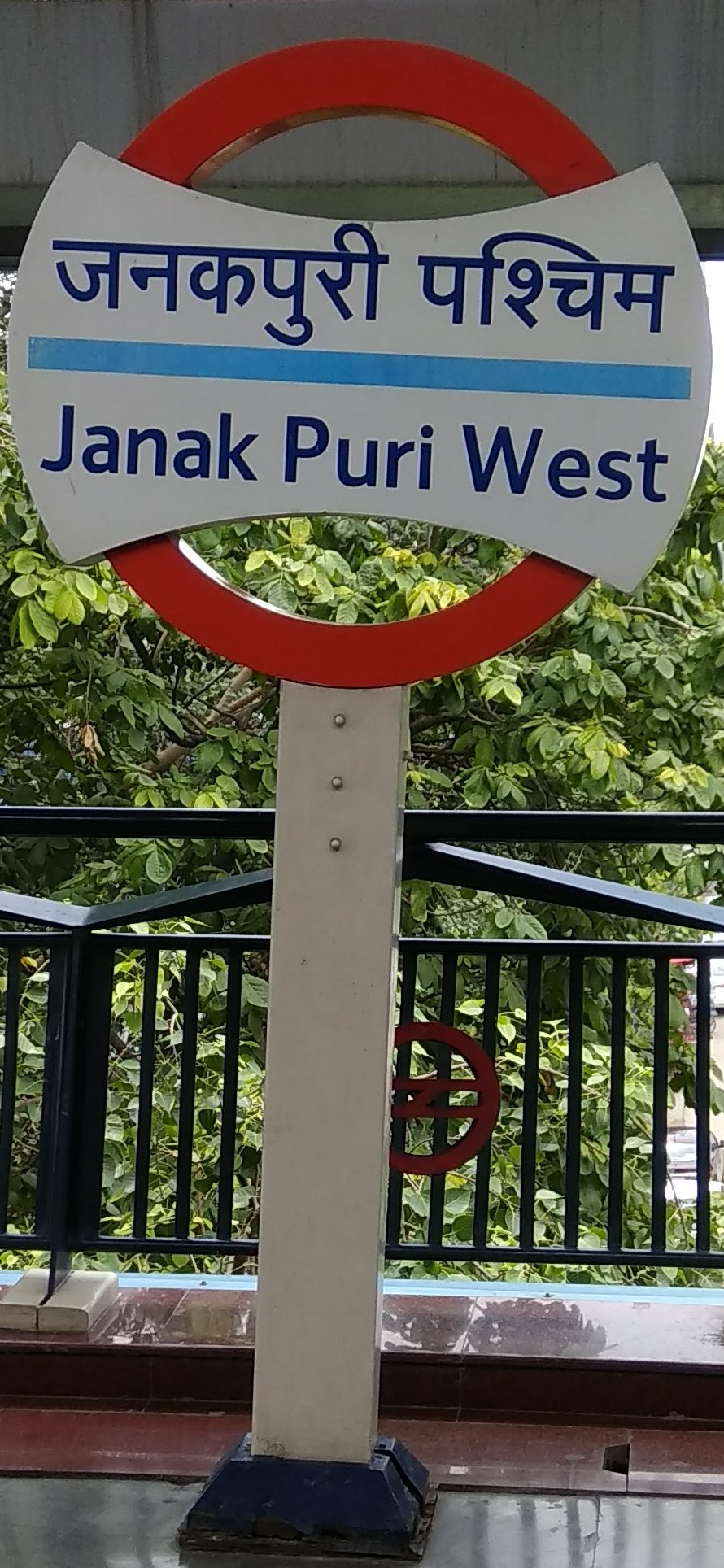

== See also ==
- Delhi
- List of Delhi Metro stations
- Transport in Delhi
- Delhi Metro Rail Corporation
- Delhi Suburban Railway
- Delhi Monorail
- Delhi Transport Corporation
- West Delhi
- New Delhi
- National Capital Region (India)
- List of rapid transit systems
- List of metro systems
