= Janakpuri East metro station =

Metro station in Delhi, India

Janakpuri East

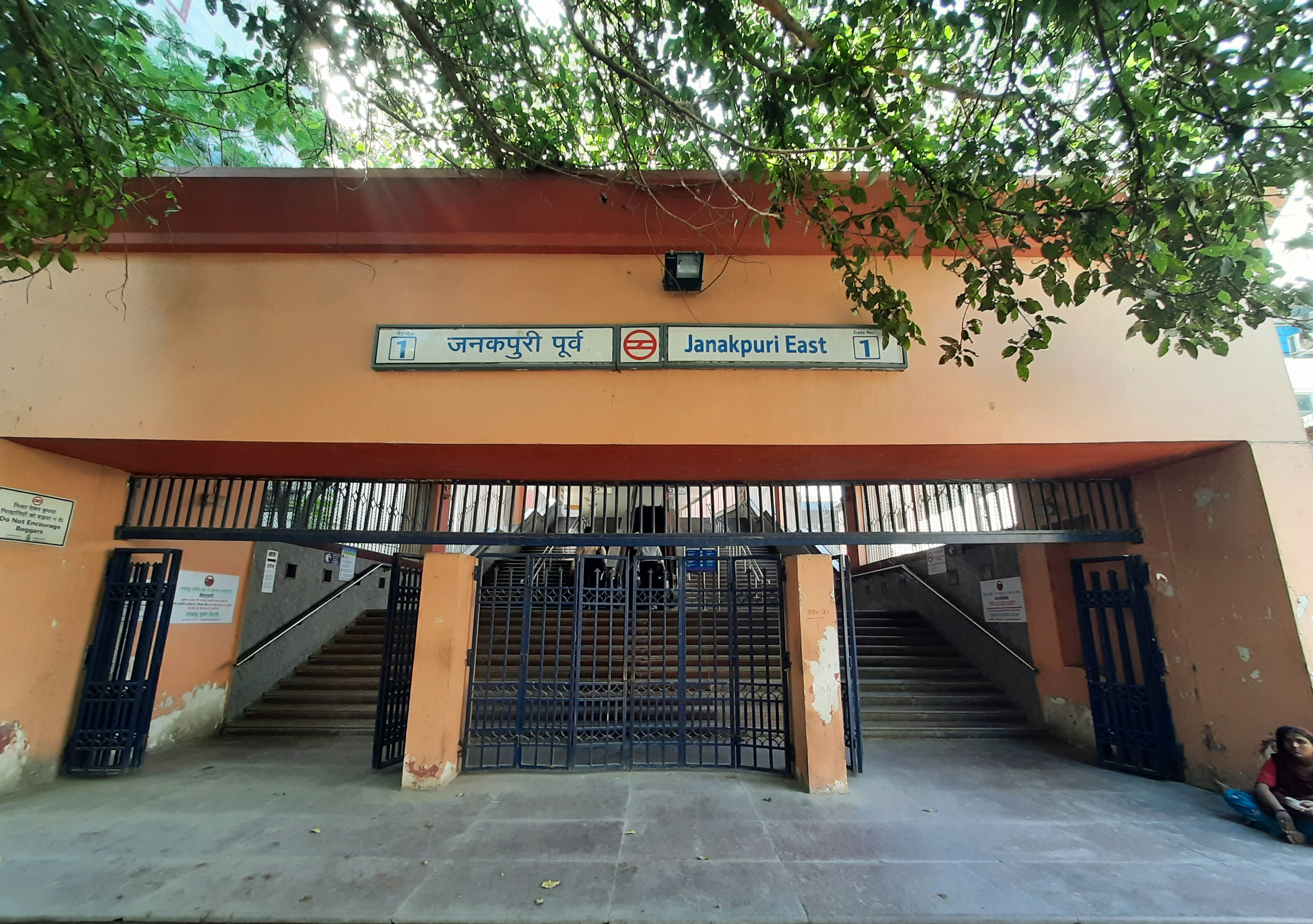

General information
- Coordinates: 28°37′59″N 77°05′12″E
- System: Delhi Metro station
- Owner: Delhi Metro
- Operator: Delhi Metro Rail Corporation (DMRC)
- Line: Blue Line
- Platforms: Side platform; Platform-1 → Noida Electronic City / Vaishali; Platform-2 → Dwarka Sector 21
- Tracks: 2

Construction
- Structure type: Elevated, Double-track
- Platform levels: 2
- Parking: Available
- Accessible: Yes

Other information
- Status: Staffed, Operational
- Station code: JPE

History
- Opened: 31 December 2005; 20 years ago
- Electrified: 25 kV 50 Hz AC through overhead catenary

Passengers
- Jan 2015: 14,143/day 439,057/ Month average

Services
Preceding station	Delhi Metro	Following station
Janakpuri West towards Dwarka Sector 21	Blue Line	Tilak Nagar towards Noida Electronic City or Vaishali
Route map
Location

The Janakpuri East metro station is located on the Blue Line of the Delhi Metro.

== The station ==
=== Station layout ===
L2	Side platform | Doors will open on the left
L2	Platform 1 Eastbound	Towards → Noida Electronic City / Vaishali; Next Station: Tilak Nagar
L2	Platform 2 Westbound	Towards ← Dwarka Sector 21; Next Station: Janakpuri West Change at the next station for Magenta Line
L2	Side platform | Doors will open on the left
L1	Concourse	Fare control, station agent, Metro Card vending machines, crossover
G	Street Level	Exit/Entrance

== Entry/Exit ==
Janakpuri East metro station Entry/exits
Gate No-1	Gate No-2	Gate No-3

== Connections ==
=== Bus ===
Delhi Transport Corporation bus routes number 588, 810, 813, 813CL, 816, 816A, 816EXT, 817, 817A, 817B, 818, 819, 822, 823, 824, 824SSTL, 825, 826, 827, 828, 829, 833, 834, 835, 836, 838, 838A, 845, 847, 861A, 871, 871A, 872, 873, 876, 878, 887, 891STL serves the station from outside metro station stop.

== See also ==
- Delhi
- List of Delhi Metro stations
- Transport in Delhi
- Delhi Metro Rail Corporation
- Delhi Suburban Railway
- Delhi Monorail
- Delhi Transport Corporation
- West Delhi
- Janakpuri
- New Delhi
- National Capital Region (India)
- List of rapid transit systems
- List of metro systems
