= UNW =

UNW may refer to:

- University of Northwestern – St. Paul
- Union of Northern Workers
- UN-Water
- UNW, the Delhi Metro station code for Uttam Nagar West metro station, New Delhi, India
