= Najafgarh metro station =

Metro station in Delhi, India

Najafgarh नजफगढ़

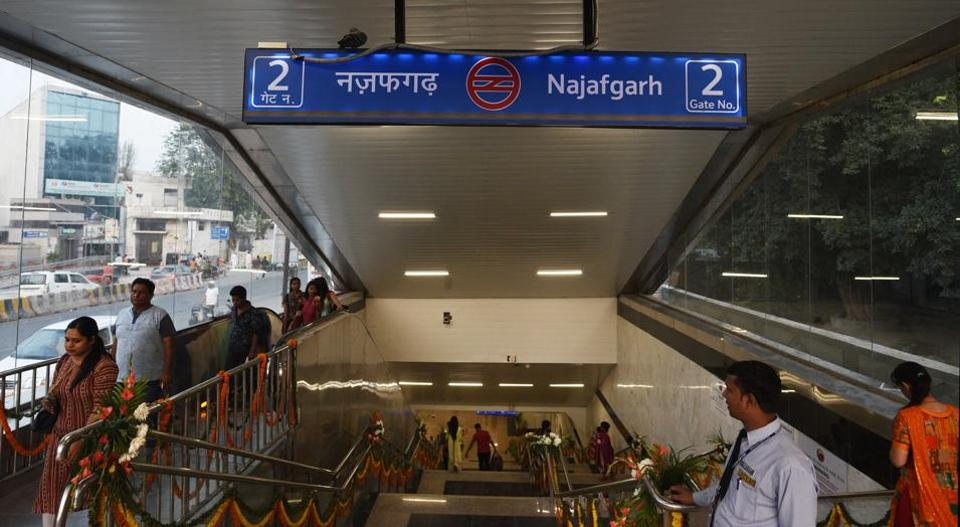

General information
- Location: Shivaji Marg, Main Chowk, Najafgarh, Delhi, 110043
- Coordinates: 28°36′45″N 76°59′11″E
- System: Delhi Metro station
- Owner: Delhi Metro
- Line: Grey Line
- Platforms: Side platform; Platform-1 → Dhansa Bus Stand; Platform-2 → Dwarka-Kakrola
- Tracks: 2

Construction
- Structure type: Underground
- Depth: 21 m (69 ft)
- Platform levels: 2

Other information
- Station code: NFGH

History
- Opened: 4 October 2019; 7 years ago
- Electrified: 25 kV 50 Hz AC through overhead catenary

Services
Preceding station	Delhi Metro	Following station
Dhansa Bus Stand Terminus	Grey Line	Nangli towards Dwarka-Kakrola
Route map
Location

The Najafgarh metro station is located on the Grey Line of the Delhi Metro. It was opened for public on 4 October 2019.

Najafgarh is an underground metro station on the Grey Line of the Delhi Metro. The station was opened to the public on 4 October 2019. It is 288 metres (945 ft) long and has a 195 metres (640 ft) long platform. The station is located approximately 21 metres (69 ft) below road level. The adjacent Najafgarh depot is unique in housing trains of both broad gauge and standard gauge, serving the Blue and Grey lines, respectively.

The existing Dwarka Metro station on the Blue Line is connected to the Grey Line station through an 80 metres (260 ft) passage. The passage provides concourse-to-concourse connectivity between the two stations within the paid area. An additional parking facility of approximately 2,000 square metres (22,000 sq ft) has also been provided at Dwarka station to accommodate increased traffic in the area. The station also provides pick-up and drop-off facilities for e-rickshaws, auto-rickshaws and buses as part of the multi-modal integration (MMI) model.

Najafgarh station was initially planned in a regular rectangular shape. However, when construction work began on the ground, some of the private land required for the project could not be acquired. As a result, the Delhi Metro had no other option but to plan the station using the land available to it. The station was consequently built in a dumbbell shape, with its width narrowing by a few metres in the middle.

== Station layout ==
G	Street Level	Exit/Entrance
L1	Concourse	Fare control, station agent, Metro Card vending machines, crossover
L2	Side platform | Doors will open on the left
L2	Platform 1 Westbound	Towards → Dhansa Bus Stand
L2	Platform 2 Eastbound	Towards ← Dwarka-Kakrola; Next Station: Nangli
L2	Side platform | Doors will open on the left
L2

== Entry/Exit ==
Najafgarh metro station Entry/exits
Gate No-1	Gate No-2	Gate No-1
OPD Primary Health Care	Govt Boys Sr. Sec School	Jyoti Memorial Hospital

== See also ==
- List of Delhi Metro stations
- Transport in Delhi
- Delhi Metro Rail Corporation
- Delhi Suburban Railway
