= Ashok Nagar (Delhi) =

- Neighborhood
- Location in Delhi, India
- Coordinates: 28.637267°N 77.10385°E
- Country: India
- State: Delhi
- District: West Delhi

Languages
  - Official: Hindi
- Time zone: UTC+5:30 (IST)
- PIN: 110 018
- Planning agency: MCD

Ashok Nagar is a neighborhood in the city of Delhi. It constitutes a part of the Tilak Nagar assembly constituency as well as the West Delhi parliamentary constituency. The area was known as Tihar Village 2 before being renamed as such. It is an authorized neighborhood today, and the government of Delhi plays a role in its development.

== History and demographics ==
Ashok Nagar is a refugee colony comprising migrant populations from Jhungh (Chinyotte), Sargodha, Bahawalpur, West Punjab, Sindh and Northwest Frontier Province. However, people from the Indian states of Uttarakhand, Rajasthan, West Bengal and Punjab, among others, also reside in this area.

== Sub-colonies ==
The township is divided into four parts: Main Blocks, the MCD Colony, Double Stories, and Uggarsen Market Area. The colony was separated in a well-planned manner into seventy blocks, each with sixteen houses surrounded by a lane on all four sides. As the 71st block lay across Jail Road, it was renamed, Prem Nagar. This area also has five public gardens, namely, Ajanta Park, Ashok Nagar Park, More wala park, 41 block Park and Tikona Park.

The neighbourhood lies adjacent to two larger parks; Jheelwala Park And Dhan Pathwar to the south and Tagore Park to the northeast. Jheelwala Park was famous for the boat rides run by the DDA. West Delhi MCD Property Tax Office is also situated in Ashok Nagar.

== Metro connectivity ==
Ashok Nagar is in proximity to two stations of the Delhi Metro: Tilak Nagar metro station and Subhash Nagar metro station, which is situated in Ashok Nagar near Meenakshi Garden and East Tilak Nagar.

== Schools ==
This neighbourhood has several schools, some of which are listed as

- Government Girls Senior Secondary School
- Government Boys Senior Secondary School
- MCD Primary School Block No. 2, Ashok Nagar
- Dera Santpura School
- Master Tara Singh School
- Mukand Lal Katyal Senior Secondary School
- Sri Sanatan Dharma Lajwanti Model School
- Gulmohar Public School
- New Delhi Public School

== Landmarks, roads and places of worship ==
Jail Road runs through the area and leads to Tihar Jail and the Tilak Nagar Metro station to the west. The Tilak Nagar Police Station and Subhash Nagar Metro station are both located to the north of Ashok Nagar, Hari Nagar to its south, and Ajay Enclave, Subhash Nagar and Rajouri Garden to its east. The main attractions of this colony are the multiple shrines, temples and Gurudwaras. It is home to people of various faiths and cultures who co-exist harmoniously. The places of worship in the neighborhood are listed below:

- Gurudawara Singh Sabha
- Sanatan Dharma Mandir
- Gurudwara Singh Sabha (Yadgar Mata Gujri Ji)
- Gurudwara Dera Santpura
- Gurudwara Baba Joravar Singh
- Gurudwara Baba Fateh Singh (formerly known as Gurudwara Chhotey Sahibjaadey)
- Mahanubhav Panth’s Jai Sri Krishna Mandir or Gopal Mandir
- Arya Samaj Mandir
- Bahawalpur Mandir
- Sindhi Mandir
- Shiv Mandir

Mukund Lal Katyal Marg, Vedik Marg (Tihar Road), Tota Ram Ahuja Marg, Jail Road and Najafgarh Road are the main roads in the area.

== Malls ==
The Pacific Mall near the Subhash Nagar Metro station was inaugurated recently. Ajanta Mall & Multiplex is now rebuilt into MIRAJ movie hall and banquet hall, on the site of the famous old Ajanta Movie Theatre, situated in Ajay Enclave Extension.
