= Rajouri Garden =

- Neighborhood of Delhi
- Rajouri Garden is in New Delhi, India
- Coordinates: 28.6441844°N 77.1118256°E
- Country: India
- State: Delhi
- District: West Delhi

Government
  - Body: South Delhi Municipal Corporation
  - Member of Parliament: Kamaljeet Sehrawat
  - Member of Legislative Assembly: Arshneet Singh Zubin

Area
  - Total: 1.961 km^{2} (0.757 sq mi)
- Elevation: 219.6 m (720 ft)

Languages
  - Official: Hindi, Punjabi, English
- Time zone: UTC+5:30 (IST)
- PIN: 110027
- Lok Sabha constituency: West Delhi
- Civic agency: SDMC

Rajouri Garden is a market and residential neighbourhood in West Delhi, India. The Main Market and Nehru Market are the key markets of the area. The population is largely Punjabi who migrated to Delhi, following the Partition of India, from Pakistan in 1947. The postal code of Rajouri Garden is 110027.

It is the headquarters of the West Delhi district of Delhi with the Office of the Deputy Commissioner situated at Shivaji Place, Rajouri Garden.

== Overview ==
TDI Mall in Shivaji Place District Centre, Rajouri Garden

Rajouri Garden was developed on land acquired from Basai Darapur, a former village, through planned urban development.

Rajouri Garden is also home to many western-style indoor shopping malls. These malls are located next to the Rajouri Garden Delhi metro stops. The malls include TDI Mall, TDI Paragon Mall, Shoppers Stop, City Square, West Gate Mall, and Pacific Mall.

Rajouri Garden is also one of the 70 constituencies of the Delhi Legislative Assembly.

Surrounding areas to Rajouri Garden are Khyala village, Mayapuri, Tagore Garden, Subhash Nagar, Shivaji Enclave, Shivaji Vihar, Raja Garden, Vishal Enclave, Punjabi Bagh, Hari Nagar, Kirti Nagar, Tagore Garden, Ramesh Nagar, and Moti Nagar. The neighbourhood is known for the passion for cars amongst its residents. The private bungalows in A, B, C, D, F, G, H, M, N, T blocks have a number of private houses and the Red, Green, Yellow and LIG DDA Apartments as well.

== Name ==
Rajouri Garden was named after Rajouri district of J&K, because people from that region named the place when they created the settlement here in Delhi after Partition.

== Education ==
The area includes several schools and colleges including:

- Govt. Boys Senior Secondary School (Rajouri Main)
- Govt. Boys Senior Secondary School (Rajouri Extn.)
- Sarvodaya Kanya Vidyalaya (Rajouri Main)
- Sarvodaya Kanya Vidyalaya (Rajouri Extn.)
- New Era Public School (in Mayapuri)
- Guru Nanak Public School
- Saraswati Bal Mandir School
- Cambridge Foundation School
- Shadley Public School
- Rajdhani College
- Shivaji College
- Guru Tegh Bahadur Institute of Technology

== Transport ==
Rajouri Garden is serviced by the Rajouri Garden metro station of the Delhi Metro, Blue Line and Pink line. Also, it also has a DTC Bus Station nearby and people can go towards Uttam Nagar, Janakpuri, Dwarka, Palam, Kashmere Gate, Narela, Punjabi Bagh, Dhaula Kuan, and other far-flung places. Two exits of the Tagore Garden metro station also lead to Rajouri Garden, notably to Block J and Green/Red MIG Flats. Rajouri Garden is an interchange station of the current Blue Line and the newly made Pink Line of the Delhi Metro Network in 2018 with the nearest metro station at Mayapuri. It will benefit passengers from Rajouri Garden and its surrounding areas to go to places located in North and East Delhi instantly. Currently, going towards North or East Delhi ranges between 60–90 minutes. The new line will supposedly reduce the time between 30–45 minutes.

== Political landscape ==
Rajouri Garden's constituency is divided into four Municipal corporations wards. following is the list of wards and the respective councillors (elected in 2017)

- Rajouri Garden (ward number 005-S): Sh. Balram Kumar Oberoi
- Tagore Garden (ward number 006-S) : Smt Kiran Chadha
- Vishnu Garden (ward number 007-S) : Sh. Satpal Kharwal
- Khyala (ward number 008-S): Ms.A Priya Chandela A

== In popular culture ==
- The 2009 Hindi-language film Aloo Chaat starring Aftab Shivdasani and Aamna Shariff was shot in Rajouri Garden.
- The 2010 Hindi-language film Band Baaja Baaraat starring Ranveer Singh and Anushka Sharma was shot in Rajouri Garden.
- The 2014 Hindi-language film Queen starring Kangana Ranaut is set in Rajouri Garden.
- The 2019 Hindi-language film Chhapak starring Deepika Padukone was shot in Rajouri Garden.
