= Uttam Nagar East metro station =

Metro station in Delhi, India

Uttam Nagar East उत्तम नगर पूर्व

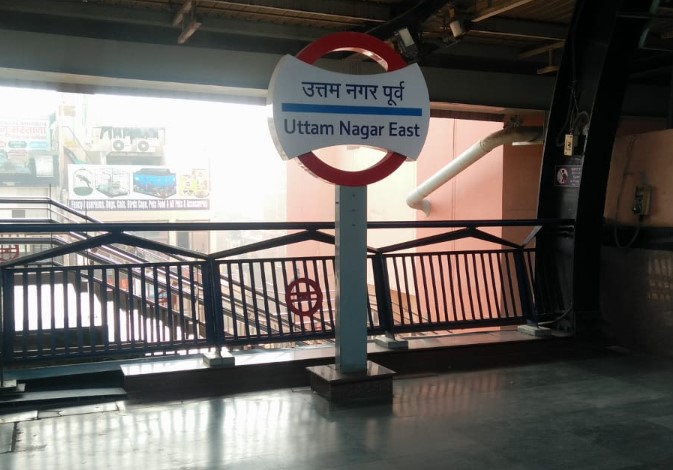

General information
- Location: Uttam Nagar, New Delhi, 110059
- Coordinates: 28°37′29″N 77°03′55″E
- System: Delhi Metro station
- Owner: Delhi Metro
- Operator: Delhi Metro Rail Corporation (DMRC)
- Line: Blue Line
- Platforms: Side platform; Platform-1 → Noida Electronic City / Vaishali; Platform-2 → Dwarka Sector 21
- Tracks: 2

Construction
- Structure type: Elevated, Double-track
- Platform levels: 2
- Parking: Available
- Accessible: Yes

Other information
- Station code: UNE

History
- Opened: 31 December 2005; 20 years ago
- Electrified: 25 kV 50 Hz AC through overhead catenary

Passengers
- Jan 2015: 41,649/day 1,291,121/ Month average

Services
Preceding station	Delhi Metro	Following station
Uttam Nagar West towards Dwarka Sector 21	Blue Line	Janakpuri West towards Noida Electronic City or Vaishali
Route map
Location

The Uttam Nagar East metro station is located on the Blue Line of the Delhi Metro.

== The station ==
=== Station layout ===
L2	Side platform | Doors will open on the left
L2	Platform 1 Eastbound	Towards → Noida Electronic City / Vaishali; Next Station: Janakpuri West Change at the next station for Magenta Line
L2	Platform 2 Westbound	Towards ← Dwarka Sector 21; Next Station: Uttam Nagar West
L2	Side platform | Doors will open on the left
L1	Concourse	Fare control, station agent, Metro Card vending machines, crossover
G	Street Level	Exit/Entrance

== Entry/Exit ==
Uttam Nagar East metro station Entry/exits
Gate 1	Gate 2	Gate 3
Uttam Nagar Depot	Pankha Road Side	
PS Uttam Nagar		

== Connections ==
=== Bus ===
Delhi Transport Corporation bus routes number 724, 724C, 724EXT, 740EXT, 816, 816A, 816EXT, 817, 817A, 817B, 818, 819, 822, 824, 824LnkSTL, 824SSTL, 825, 826, 827, 828, 829, 832LinkSTL, 833, 834, 835, 836, 845, 872, 873, 876, 878, 883A, 891STL, serve the station from outside metro station stop.

== Gallery ==
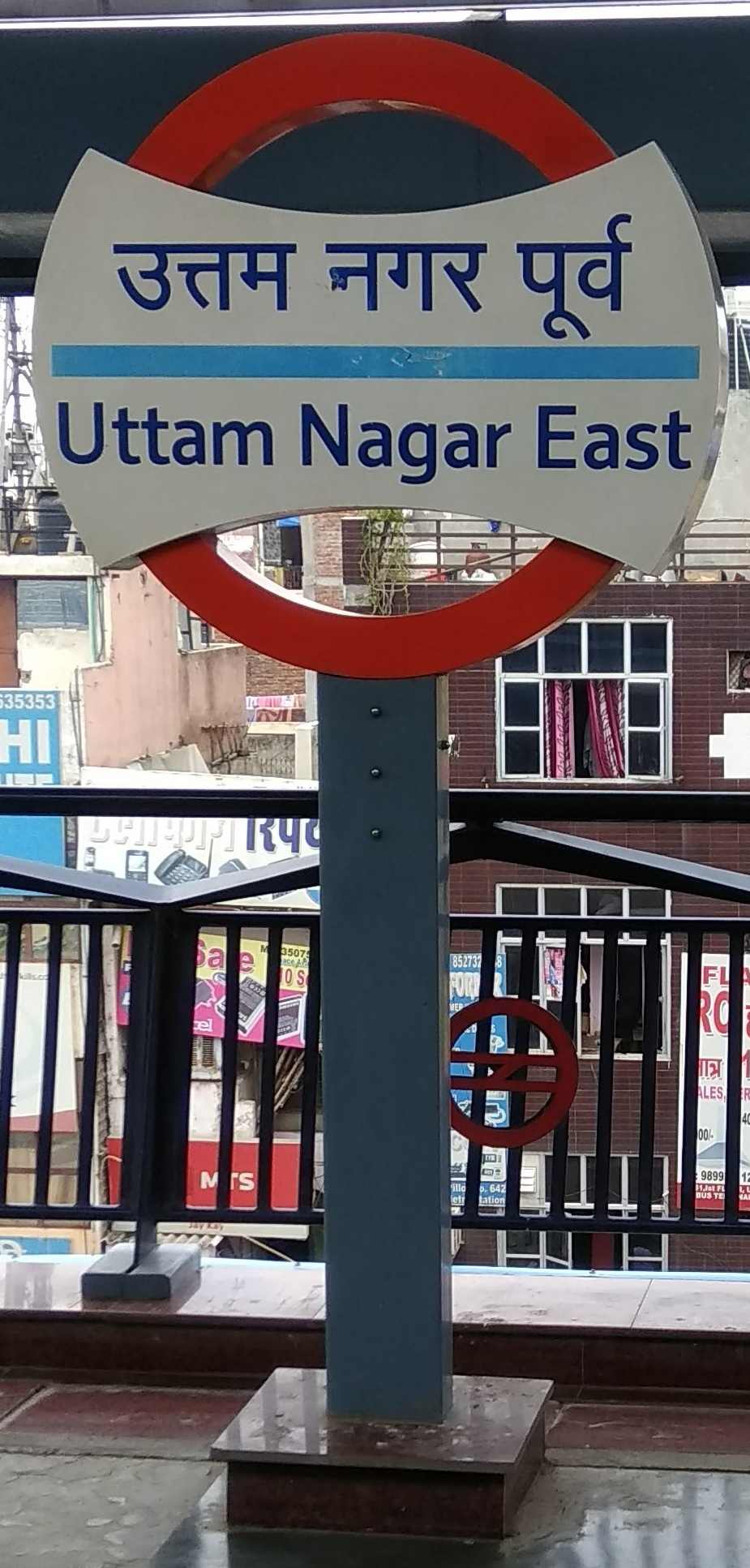

== See also ==
- Delhi
- List of Delhi Metro stations
- Transport in Delhi
- Delhi Metro Rail Corporation
- Delhi Suburban Railway
- Delhi Monorail
- Delhi Transport Corporation
- West Delhi
- New Delhi
- Dwarka, Delhi
- National Capital Region (India)
- List of rapid transit systems
- List of metro systems
