= Tilak Nagar metro station =

Metro station in Delhi, India

Tilak Nagar

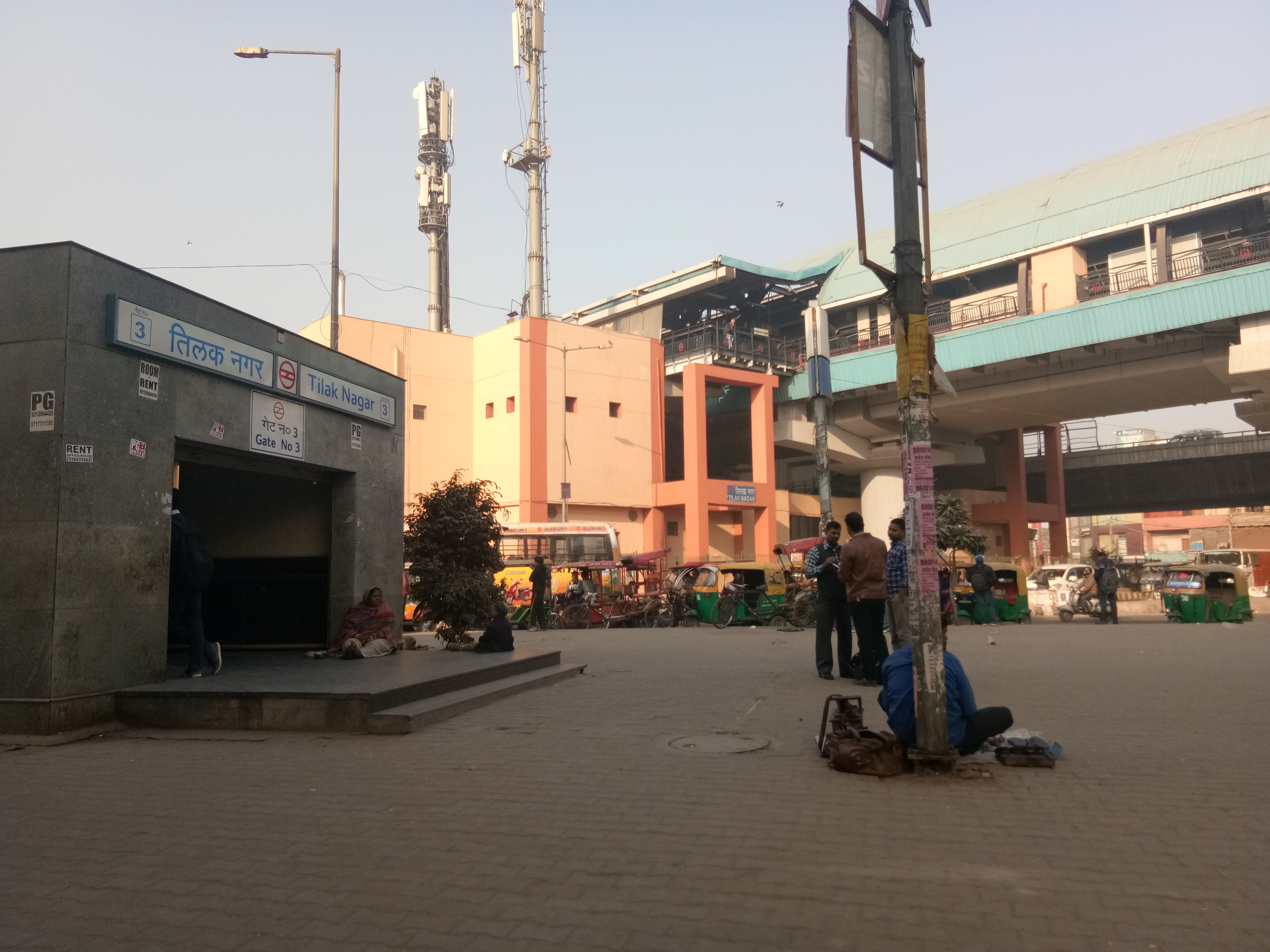

General information
- Location: Shivaji Marg Flyover, Prem Nagar, Tilak Nagar, Delhi, 110018
- Coordinates: 28°38′12″N 77°05′47″E
- System: Delhi Metro station
- Owner: Delhi Metro
- Operator: Delhi Metro Rail Corporation (DMRC)
- Line: Blue Line
- Platforms: Side platform; Platform-1 → Noida Electronic City / Vaishali; Platform-2 → Dwarka Sector 21
- Tracks: 2

Construction
- Structure type: Elevated, Double-track
- Parking: Available
- Accessible: Yes

Other information
- Status: Staffed, Operational
- Station code: TN

History
- Opened: 31 December 2005; 20 years ago
- Electrified: 25 kV 50 Hz AC through overhead catenary

Passengers
- Jan 2015: 24,110/day 747,396/ Month average

Services
Preceding station	Delhi Metro	Following station
Janakpuri East towards Dwarka Sector 21	Blue Line	Subhash Nagar towards Noida Electronic City or Vaishali
Route map
Location

The Tilak Nagar metro station is located on the Blue Line of the Delhi Metro.

== The station ==
=== Station layout ===
P Platform	Side platform | Doors will open on the left
P Platform	Platform 1 Eastbound	Towards → Noida Electronic City / Vaishali; Next Station: Subhash Nagar
P Platform	Platform 2 Westbound	Towards ← Dwarka Sector 21; Next Station: Janakpuri East
P Platform	Side platform | Doors will open on the left
C	Concourse
G	Street Level	Exit/Entrance
G		Fare collection gates, station agent, Ticket vending machines
B	Basement	Pedestrian subway

== Entry/Exit ==
Tilak Nagar metro station Entry/exits
Gate No-1	Gate No-2	Gate No-3	Gate No-4
Central Market	Saatmanjila Temple, Central Market	Ashok Nagar, Fateh Nagar, Jail Road	Prem Nagar

== Connections ==
=== Bus ===
Delhi Transport Corporation bus routes number 73, 234, 308, 588, 808, 818, 819, 822, 824, 825, 826, 827, 828, 829, 832, 834, 835, 836, 838, 838A, 845, 849, 861A, 864, 872, 873, 876, 878, 887, 891STL serves the station from outside metro station stop.

== See also ==
- Delhi
- List of Delhi Metro stations
- Transport in Delhi
- Delhi Metro Rail Corporation
- Delhi Suburban Railway
- Delhi Monorail
- Delhi Transport Corporation
- West Delhi
- Tilak Nagar (Delhi)
- New Delhi
- National Capital Region (India)
- List of rapid transit systems
- List of metro systems
