= Nawada metro station =

Metro station in Delhi, India

Nawada नवादा

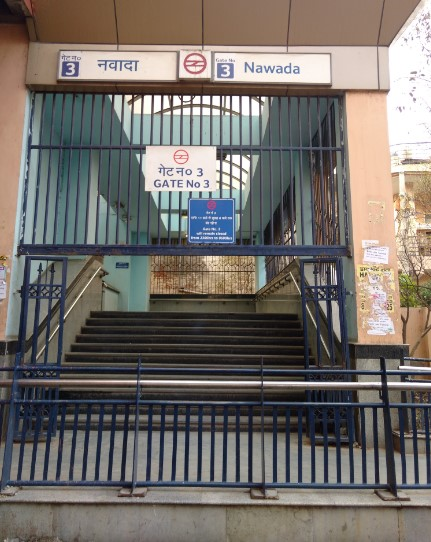

General information
- Location: ICICI Bank ATM opposite Hanuman Mandir New, Nawada, Delhi, 110059
- Coordinates: 28°37′13″N 77°02′42″E
- System: Delhi Metro station
- Owner: Delhi Metro
- Operator: Delhi Metro Rail Corporation (DMRC)
- Line: Blue Line
- Platforms: Side platform; Platform-1 → Noida Electronic City / Vaishali; Platform-2 → Dwarka Sector 21
- Tracks: 2

Construction
- Structure type: Elevated, Double-track
- Platform levels: 2
- Parking: Available
- Accessible: Yes

Other information
- Status: Staffed, Operational
- Station code: NWD

History
- Opened: 31 December 2005; 20 years ago
- Electrified: 25 kV 50 Hz AC through overhead catenary

Passengers
- Jan 2015: 17,313/day 536,693/ Month average

Services
Preceding station	Delhi Metro	Following station
Dwarka Mor towards Dwarka Sector 21	Blue Line	Uttam Nagar West towards Noida Electronic City or Vaishali
Route map
Location

The Nawada metro station is located on the Blue Line of the Delhi Metro.

== The station ==
=== Station layout ===
L2	Side platform | Doors will open on the left
L2	Platform 1 Eastbound	Towards → Noida Electronic City / Vaishali; Next Station: Uttam Nagar West
L2	Platform 2 Westbound	Towards ← Dwarka Sector 21; Next Station: Dwarka Mor
L2	Side platform | Doors will open on the left
L1	Concourse	Fare control, station agent, Metro Card vending machines, crossover
G	Street Level	Exit/Entrance

=== Facilities ===
List of available ATM at Nawada metro station are State Bank of India, Punjab National Bank.

== Entry/Exit ==
Nawada metro station Entry/exits
Gate No-1	Gate No-2

== Connections ==
=== Bus ===
Delhi Transport Corporation bus routes number 783, 816A, 817, 817A, 817B, 818, 819, 822, 824, 824LnkSTL, 824SSTL, 824STL, 825, 826, 827, 828, 829, 832LinkSTL, 833, 834, 835, 836, 845, 872, 873, 876, 887, 891STL, WDM (-), serves the station from outside metro station stop.

== Gallery ==
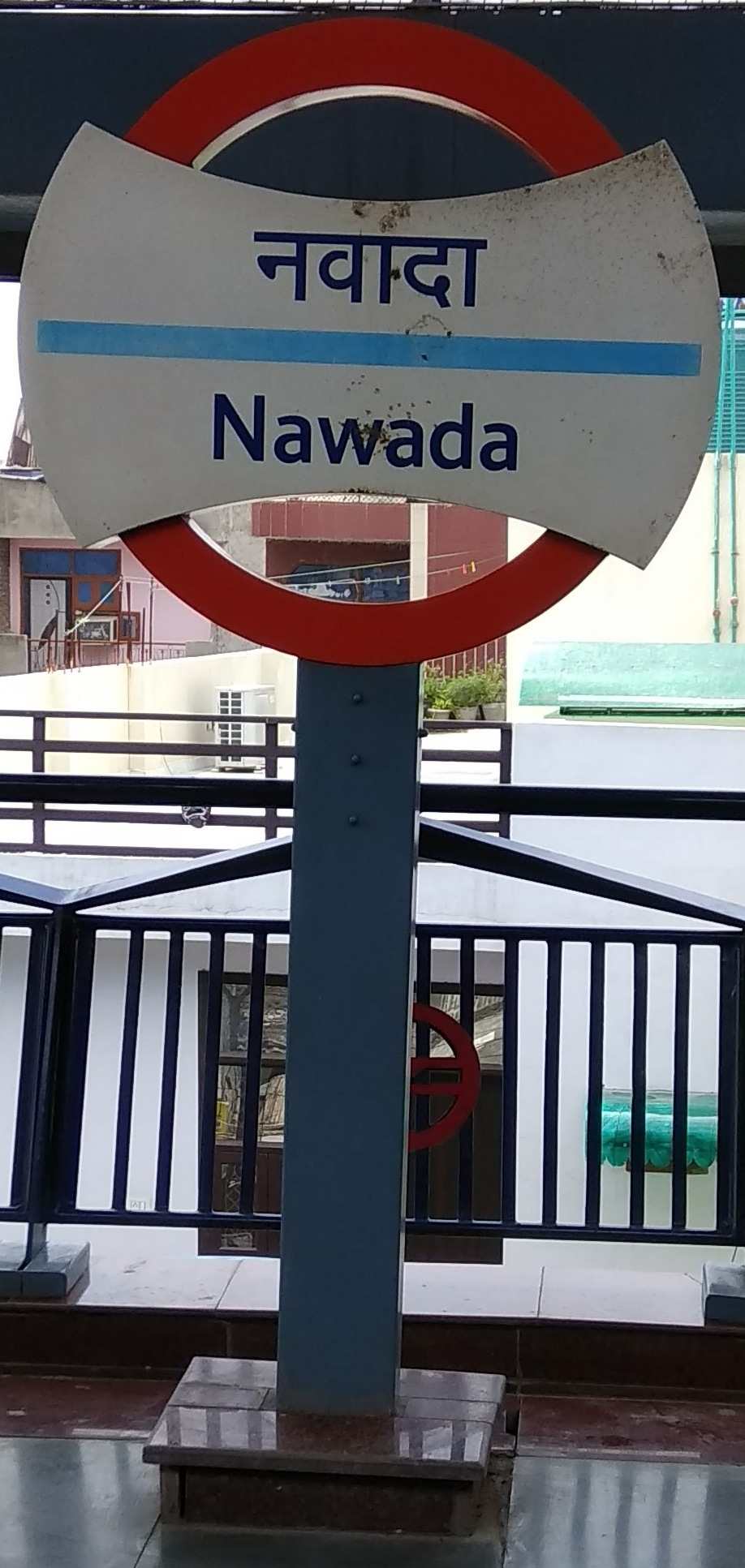
Nawada metro signboard

== See also ==
- Delhi
- List of Delhi Metro stations
- Transport in Delhi
- Delhi Metro Rail Corporation
- Delhi Suburban Railway
- Delhi Monorail
- Delhi Transport Corporation
- West Delhi
- New Delhi
- Dwarka, Delhi
- National Capital Region (India)
- List of rapid transit systems
- List of metro systems
