= Tagore Garden metro station =

Metro station in Delhi, India

Tagore Garden

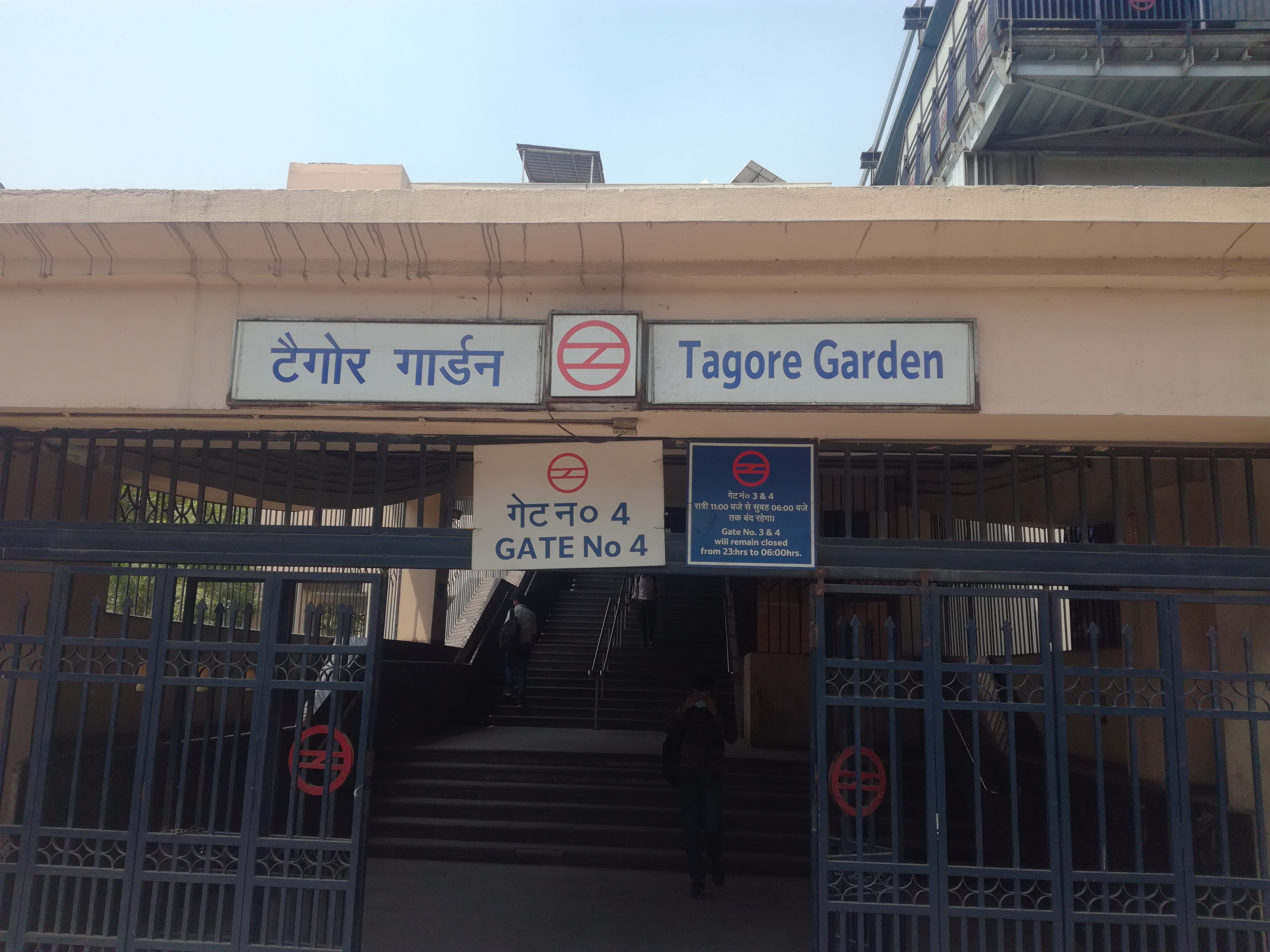

General information
- Coordinates: 28°38′37″N 77°06′46″E
- System: Delhi Metro station
- Owner: Delhi Metro
- Operator: Delhi Metro Rail Corporation (DMRC)
- Line: Blue Line
- Platforms: Side platform; Platform-1 → Noida Electronic City / Vaishali; Platform-2 → Dwarka Sector 21
- Tracks: 2

Construction
- Structure type: Elevated, Double-track
- Platform levels: 2
- Parking: Available
- Cycle facilities: yes
- Accessible: Yes

Other information
- Status: Staffed, Operational
- Station code: TG

History
- Opened: 31 December 2005; 20 years ago
- Electrified: 25 kV 50 Hz AC through overhead catenary

Passengers
- Jan 2015: 13,731/day 425,664/ Month average

Services
| Preceding station | Delhi Metro | Following station |
|---|---|---|
| Subhash Nagar towards Dwarka Sector 21 | Blue Line | Rajouri Garden towards Noida Electronic City or Vaishali |
Route map
Location

The Tagore Garden metro station is located on the Blue Line of the Delhi Metro. It services the residential neighbourhood of Tagore Garden which is named after Rabindranath Tagore.

== The station ==
=== Station layout ===
| L2 | Side platform | Doors will open on the left |
| L2 | Platform 1 Eastbound | Towards → Noida Electronic City / Vaishali; Next Station: Rajouri Garden Change at the next station for Pink Line |
| L2 | Platform 2 Westbound | Towards ← Dwarka Sector 21; Next Station: Subhash Nagar |
| L2 | Side platform | Doors will open on the left |
| L1 | Concourse | Fare control, station agent, Metro Card vending machines, crossover |
| G | Street Level | Exit/Entrance |

== Entry/Exit ==
Tagore Garden metro station Entry/exits
| Gate No-1 | Gate No-2 | Gate No-3 | Gate No-4 |
|---|---|---|---|
| Kendriya Vidyalaya, Khyala | Guru Govind Singh Hospital | Cambridge School, DDA Flats | J-Block, Rajouri Garden, Green Flats |

== Connections ==
=== Bus ===
Delhi Transport Corporation bus routes number 234, 308, 410, 410ACL, 410CL, 801, 810, 813, 813CL, 816, 816A, 816EXT, 817, 817A, 817B, 820, 823, 832, 833, 841, 847, 861A, 871, 871A serves the station from outside metro station stop.

== See also ==
- Delhi
- List of Delhi Metro stations
- Transport in Delhi
- Delhi Metro Rail Corporation
- Delhi Suburban Railway
- Delhi Monorail
- Delhi Transport Corporation
- Central Delhi
- New Delhi
- National Capital Region (India)
- List of rapid transit systems
- List of metro systems
