= Shivaji Place =

- Neighborhood of Delhi

- Location in Delhi, India
- Coordinates: 28.6532°N 77.1225°E
- Country: India
- State: Delhi
- District: West Delhi

Languages
  - Official: Hindi
- Time zone: UTC+5:30 (IST)
- Planning agency: MCD

City Square in Shivaji Place District Centre

Shivaji Place District Centre is a commercial centre located in Rajouri Garden, West Delhi, India. The district centre is currently under development and only five shopping malls are currently operational.

== Location ==
The Shivaji Place District Centre is located in the heart of Rajouri Garden in west Delhi. It is connected by the Ring Road and Najafgarh Road and it is opposite the Rajouri Garden Market. The catchment of the district centre comprises the prime residential localities of Punjabi Bagh, Rajouri Garden, Shivaji Enclave, Shivaji Vihar, Tilak Nagar, Mansarovar Garden, Kirti Nagar, Paschim Vihar and Patel Nagar. The district centre is also on the Blue Line of the Delhi Metro.

== Features ==
The Shivaji Place District Centre is spread over 65 acres (260,000 m^{2}). It is planned that the district centre will consist of eleven shopping malls along with commercial and office buildings, a five star hotel and a Nigam Habitat Centre similar to the India Habitat Centre. Currently, there are five functional malls: City Square, TDI Mall, TDI Paragon, Shopper's Stop and West Gate Mall. Additionally, the area also has a Delhi Metro station, a DTC bus terminal, a police station, a telephone exchange, MCD office, two petrol pumps, and the Vishal Cinema. There will be adequate parking both at the periphery of the development as well as underground parking and also large pedestrian plazas and extensively landscaped areas.

== Shopping Malls ==
TDI Mall in Shivaji Place District Centre

=== City Square ===
City Square is a shopping mall located in Shivaji District Centre. It was developed by the MGF Group. The main feature of this mall is a large StanMax Department Store. The mall also includes a Nike store, Converse, Hazoorilal, SnowWhite, Woodland and a KFC.

=== TDI Mall ===
TDI Mall is a shopping mall located in Shivaji Place District Centre. It was developed by the TDI Group. The mall has four floors plus two basement levels for parking and services. The focal point of the mall is a large atrium, with all the shops opening into it. The mall features a large TATA Westide Department store along with stores representing many major local and international brands including United Colors of Benetton, Reebok, Adidas, Levi's, Dockers. The mall also has a food court along with several restaurants including Pizza Hut, Subway and Ruby Tuesday.

TDI Paragon Mall in Shivaji Place District Centre

=== TDI Pargon Mall ===
TDI Paragon Mall is a shopping mall located in Shivaji Place District Centre. It was developed by the TDI Group. The mall has three floors plus two level basements for parking and services. The main feature of this mall is the four-screen Wave cinemas multiplex on the third floor, which opened in 2007. This is the first of the three multiplexes to open in the district centre. The multiplex has a combined seating of around 1036.

=== Shopper's Stop ===
Shoppers Stop is a stand-alone store for the Shopper's Stop Department Store. It was developed by the Eros Group. The store consists of three levels.

=== West Gate Mall ===
West Gate Mall is a shopping mall located in Shivaji Place District Centre. It was developed by the Today Homes Group. The mall has five floors plus two levels of basement parking and is currently the largest mall in Shivaji Place. The mall has three anchor stores which include Pantaloons and Marks & Spencer along with stores representing many major international brands of clothes and apparels including United Colors of Benetton, Lacoste, Next, Guess, Adidas, Reebok, Nike, Van Heusen, Levi's, Jockey, and The Body Shop. The mall has a food court and a TGIs Fridays restaurant. There is also a six-screen Movie Time multiplex on the fourth floor

=== Paradise Mall ===
Paradise Mall is a shopping mall under construction in Shivaji Place District Centre.tegha It will be the location of a six-screen PVR Cinemas multiplex..
