= Uttam Nagar West metro station =

Metro station in Delhi, India

Uttam Nagar West उत्तम नगर पश्चिम

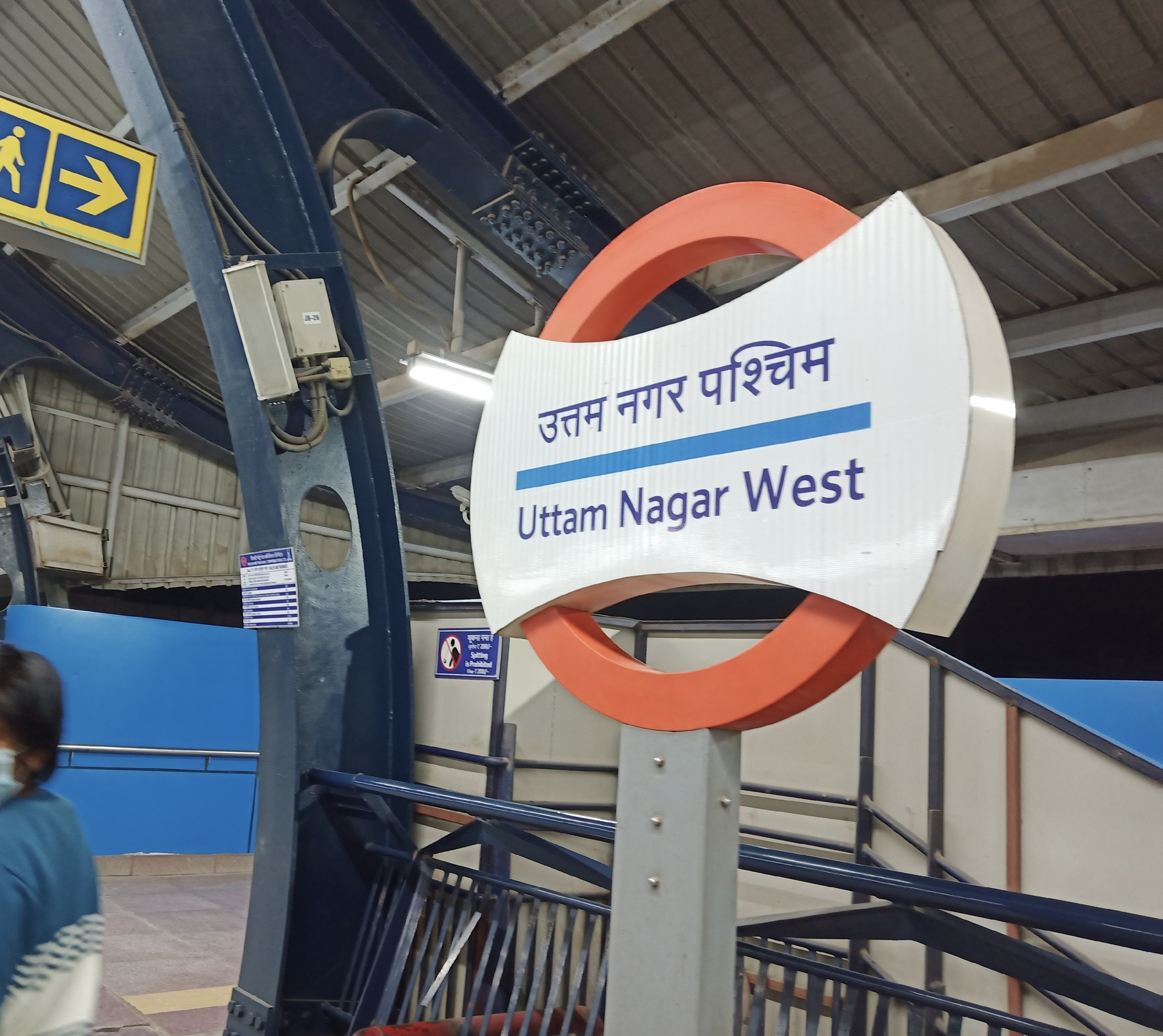

General information
- Location: Najafgarh Road, Param Puri, Uttam Nagar, New Delhi, 110059
- Coordinates: 28°37′18″N 77°03′21″E
- System: Delhi Metro station
- Owner: Delhi Metro
- Operator: Delhi Metro Rail Corporation (DMRC)
- Line: Blue Line
- Platforms: Side platform; Platform-1 → Noida Electronic City / Vaishali; Platform-2 → Dwarka Sector 21
- Tracks: 2

Construction
- Structure type: Elevated, Double-track
- Platform levels: 2
- Parking: Available
- Accessible: Yes

Other information
- Status: Staffed, Operational
- Station code: UNW

History
- Opened: 31 December 2005; 20 years ago
- Electrified: 25 kV 50 Hz AC through overhead catenary

Passengers
- Jan 2015: 15,953/day 494,541/ Month average

Services
Preceding station	Delhi Metro	Following station
Nawada towards Dwarka Sector 21	Blue Line	Uttam Nagar East towards Noida Electronic City or Vaishali
Route map
Location

The Uttam Nagar West metro station is located on the Blue Line of the Delhi Metro.

== The station ==
=== Station layout ===
L2	Side platform | Doors will open on the left
L2	Platform 1 Eastbound	Towards → Noida Electronic City / Vaishali; Next Station: Uttam Nagar East
L2	Platform 2 Westbound	Towards ← Dwarka Sector 21; Next Station: Nawada
L2	Side platform | Doors will open on the left
L1	Concourse	Fare control, station agent, Metro Card vending machines, crossover
G	Street Level	Exit/Entrance

== Entry/Exit ==
Uttam Nagar West metro station Entry/exits
Gate No-1	Gate No-2	Gate No-3

== Facilities ==
List of available ATM at Uttam Nagar West metro station are Oriental Bank of Commerce, Punjab National Bank.

== Connections ==
=== Bus ===
Delhi Transport Corporation bus routes number 724EXT, 816A, 816EXT, 817, 817A, 817B, 818, 819, 822, 824, 824LnkSTL, 824SSTL, 824STL, 825, 826, 827, 828, 829, 832LinkSTL, 833, 834, 835, 836, 845, 872, 873, 876, 878, 883A, 887, 891STL, serves the station from outside metro station stop.

== Gallery ==
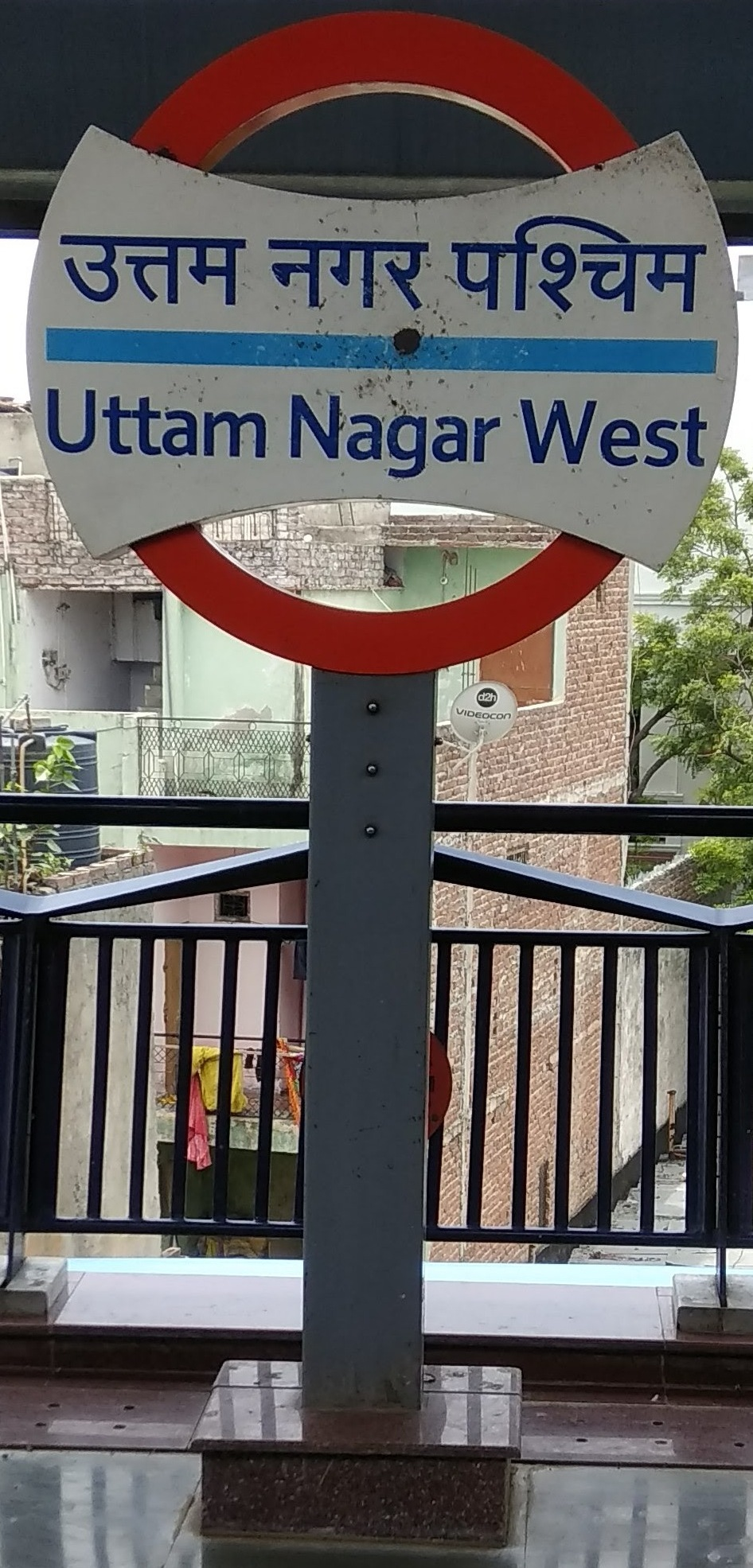

== See also ==
- Delhi
- List of Delhi Metro stations
- Transport in Delhi
- Delhi Metro Rail Corporation
- Delhi Suburban Railway
- Delhi Monorail
- Delhi Transport Corporation
- West Delhi
- New Delhi
- Dwarka, Delhi
- National Capital Region (India)
- List of rapid transit systems
- List of metro systems
