= Delhi Integrated Multi-Modal Transit System =

Public transport service in Delhi, India

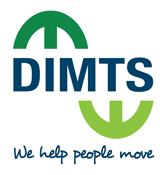
Delhi Integrated Multi-Modal Transit System (DIMTS) Limited

Delhi Integrated Multi-Modal Transit System (DIMTS) Limited is a transport consultancy and infrastructure development company. It is a joint venture company of Government of National Capital Territory of Delhi (GNCTD).

== Incorporation ==
DIMTS was established in 2006 with the objective of undertaking the preparation, planning, design, and execution of intricate transport-oriented initiatives. In 2007, DIMTS became an equal equity joint venture company of the Government of National Capital Territory of Delhi (GNCTD).

== Memberships & Partnerships ==
DIMTS is affiliated with several organizations including the Transportation Research & Injury Prevention Programme (TRIPP) at IIT Delhi, the International Association of Public Transport (UITP), the Transport Research Laboratory (TRL) in the United Kingdom, Indian Railways, the Consulting Engineers Association of India, and the Open Standard for Public Transport (OSPT™) Alliance.

== Key Projects ==
DIMTS has been involved in various projects including:

- Preparation of Detailed Project Reports (DPR) for seven Bus Rapid Transit (BRT) corridors in Delhi.
- DPR for the Regional Rapid Transit System for two corridors: Panipat-Sonepat-Delhi (111 km) and Meerut-Ghaziabad-Delhi (92 km).
- Route rationalization of all bus routes in Delhi through a DPR.
- Technical and financial feasibility study for Mumbai Metropolitan Region Development Authority (MMRDA) in Mumbai.
- DPR for Bengaluru International Airport Rail Link Limited.
- Feasibility study for Personal Rapid Transit in Delhi.
- Comprehensive Mobility Plans (CMP) for various cities including Bhopal, Dehradun, Mussoorie, Rohtak, and Thoottukudi (Tamil Nadu).
- Implementation of GPRS-based Electronic Ticketing Machines (ETM) for ticketing in Delhi.
- Implementation, operation, and management of Intelligent Signalling System on the Ambedkar Nagar-Delhi Gate BRT Corridor.
- Implementation of automatic vehicle location and tracking system for the entire public transit bus fleet in Delhi.
- Engineering studies for the re-development/development of Inter-State Bus Terminals (ISBTs) at Kashmere Gate, Sarai Kale Khan, Anand Vihar, and Dwarka.
- Design and construction of depot facilities.
- Construction of Foot Over Bridges (FOBs), subways, and bus shelters at various locations in Delhi.
- Detailed project reports and project management consultancy for rail line implementation.
- Detailed Design Engineering for bridges and tracks.
- Pre-feasibility report for railway siding.
- Restoration and repair work of 186 signalized intersections and up-gradation of Control Room with remote monitoring for Ahmedabad Municipal Corporation.
- Consultancy for the design, specifications, and estimate of Highway Traffic Management System for Noida-Greater Noida Gautam Buddha Expressway.
- Operation and maintenance of SCOT & CCTV-based Intelligent Signalling System on BRT corridor, Delhi.

== Not-for-profit Initiatives ==
DIMTS has developed several mobile applications and initiatives including:

- Delhi Transit Bus Info mobile application: This application enables the public to access information about bus routes, bus stops, and estimated arrival times of buses at specific bus stops in Delhi.
- TellTail Security mobile application: This application allows individuals to alert their friends and family in emergency situations with the press of a button. It utilizes GPS tracking to provide visual information of the user's location on a map to their contacts, enabling them to seek help when needed.
- Cycle Stations at the BRT corridor: These stations are designed to promote cycling among the public by providing convenient access to bicycles at designated points along the Bus Rapid Transit (BRT) corridor.
- Cycle rallies at the BRT corridor: DIMTS organizes cycling events and rallies along the BRT corridor to encourage the public to embrace cycling as a sustainable mode of transportation.
