= Gadaipur, Mehrauli =

Gadaipur
- Neighborhood of Delhi
- Location in Delhi, India
- Coordinates: 28.4892°N 77.1499°E
- Country: India
- State: Delhi
- District: South Delhi
- Time zone: UTC+5:30 (IST)
- PIN: 110030
- Civic agency: MCD

Gadaipur is a village in the DLF Farm area of the South Delhi district in UT of Delhi, India.
