= Dwarka-Kakrola metro station =

Metro station in Delhi, India

Dwarka Kakrola द्वारका ककरोला

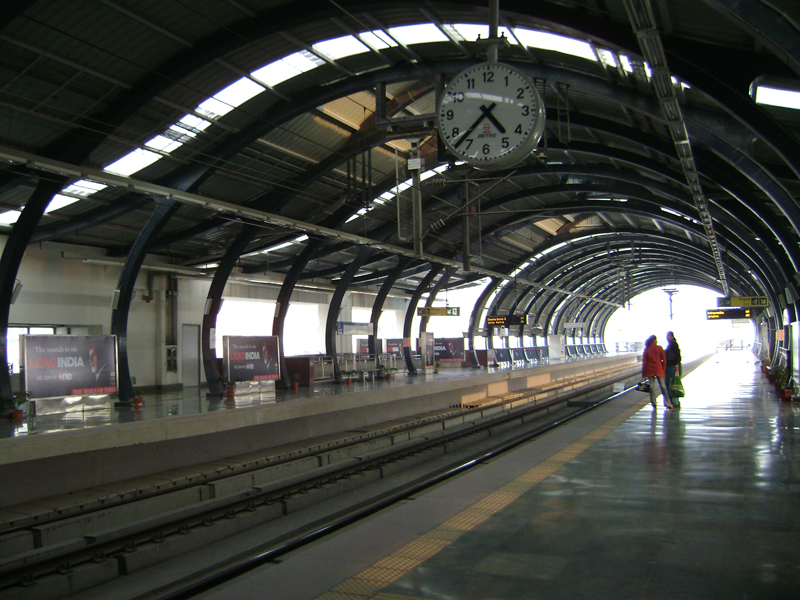

General information
- Location: Dwarka, Delhi, 110078
- Coordinates: 28°36′54″N 77°01′22″E
- System: Delhi Metro station
- Owner: Delhi Metro
- Line: Blue Line Grey Line
- Platforms: 5
- Tracks: 5

Construction
- Structure type: Elevated
- Parking: Available
- Cycle facilities: 100
- Accessible: Yes

Other information
- Station code: DW
- Fare zone: 2

History
- Opened: Blue Line 31 December 2005; 20 years ago Grey Line 4 October 2019; 6 years ago
- Electrified: 25 kV 50 Hz AC through overhead catenary

Passengers
- 2005: 600000
- 800000

Services
Preceding station	Delhi Metro	Following station
Dwarka Sector 14 towards Dwarka Sector 21	Blue Line	Dwarka Mor towards Noida Electronic City or Vaishali
Nangli towards Dhansa Bus Stand	Grey Line	Terminus
Route map
Location

The Dwarka Kakrola (formerly known as Dwarka) metro station is located on the Blue Line and Grey Line of the Delhi Metro. The Station is an interchange station between the lines. Some of the Metro Services terminate here of the blue line.

== Station layout ==
Station Layout Grey Line

P	Side platform | Doors will open on the left
P	Platform 4 Eastbound	Towards → Dhansa Bus Stand; Next Station: Nangli
P	Platform 5 Westbound	Towards ← Train Terminates Here
P	Side platform | Doors will open on the left
L1	Concourse	Fare control, station agent, Metro Card vending machines, crossover
G	Street Level	Exit/Entrance

Station Layout Blue Line

P	Side platform | Doors will open on the left
P	Platform 1 Eastbound	Towards → Noida Electronic City or Vaishali; Next Station: Dwarka Mor
P	Platform 2 Westbound	Towards ← Dwarka Sector 21; Next Station: Dwarka Sector 14
P	Side platform | Doors will open on the left
C	Concourse	Fare control, station agent, metro card vending machines, crossover
G	Street Level	Gates

== Facilities ==
List of available ATM at Dwarka metro station are Oriental Bank of Commerce, State Bank of India.
