= Dhansa Bus Stand metro station =

Metro station in Delhi, India

Dhansa Bus Stand ढांसा बस स्टैंड

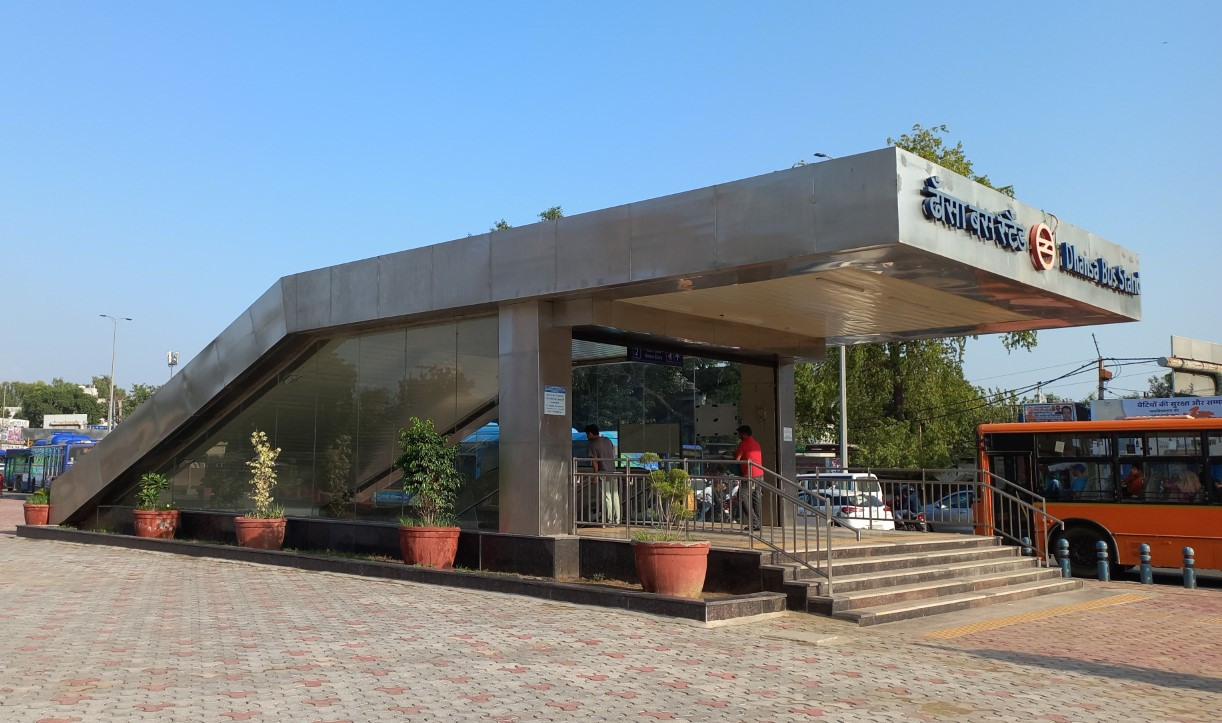

General information
- Location: Main Dhansa bus stand, Najafgarh Dhansa, Najafgarh, Delhi, 110043
- Coordinates: 28°36′43″N 76°58′43″E
- System: Delhi Metro station
- Owner: Delhi Metro
- Line: Grey Line
- Platforms: Side platform; Platform-1 → Train Terminates; Platform-2 → Dwarka-Kakrola
- Tracks: 2

Construction
- Structure type: Underground
- Parking: Available
- Accessible: Yes

Other information
- Station code: DNBT

History
- Opened: 18 September 2021; 5 years ago

Services
| Preceding station | Delhi Metro | Following station |
|---|---|---|
| Terminus | Grey Line | Najafgarh towards Dwarka-Kakrola |
Route map
Location

Dhansa Bus Stand is an underground terminal metro station on the Grey Line of the Delhi Metro, located in Najafgarh, South-West Delhi. It was opened to the public on 18 September 2021, following the inauguration of the 1.2 kilometres (0.75 mi) Najafgarh–Dhansa Bus Stand extension by Union Minister for Housing and Urban Affairs Hardeep Singh Puri and Delhi Chief Minister Arvind Kejriwal.

== Station layout ==
| G | Street Level | Exit/Entrance |
| L1 | Concourse | Fare control, station agent, Metro Card vending machines, crossover |
| L2 | Side platform | Doors will open on the left |
| L2 | Platform 1 Westbound | Towards → Train Terminates Here |
| L2 | Platform 2 Eastbound | Towards ← Dwarka-Kakrola; Next Station: Najafgarh |
| L2 | Side platform | Doors will open on the left |
| L2 |

== Entry/Exit ==
Dhansa Bus Stand metro station Entry/exits
| Gate No-1 | Gate No-2 | Gate No-3 |
|---|---|---|
| Fire Station | MCD Office | Dhansa Bus Stop |

== Facilities ==
The station was designed as a four-level underground structure, with the platform at a depth of approximately 18 metres (59 ft). It is the first station in the Delhi Metro network to have an entire underground floor dedicated to vehicle parking. The integrated facility provides parking for approximately 110 cars and 185 two-wheelers, with direct access to the station concourse through lifts and escalators.

== See also ==
- List of Delhi Metro stations
- Transport in Delhi
- Delhi Metro Rail Corporation
- Delhi Suburban Railway
