= Grey Line (Delhi Metro) =

Line on the Delhi Metro system

Grey Line (Line 9)
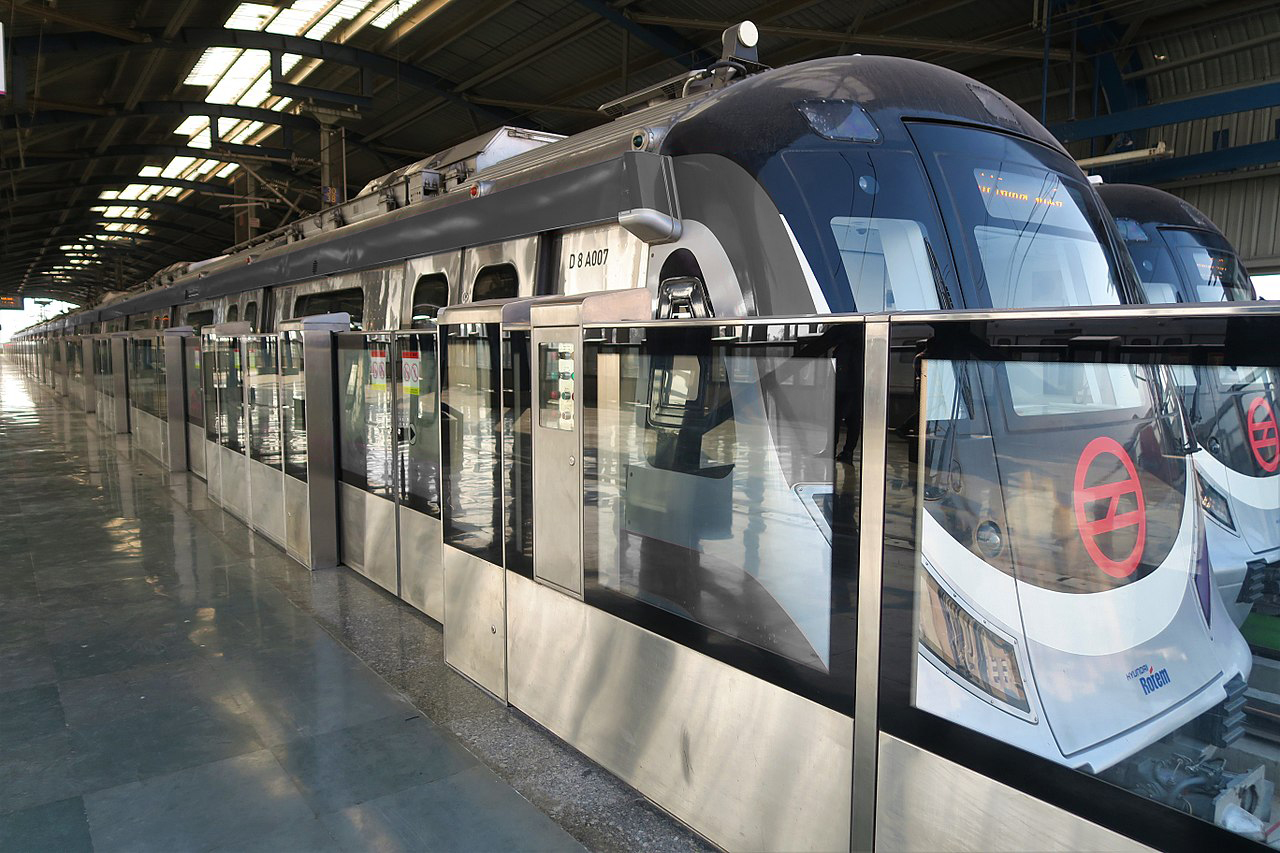

Overview
- Status: Operational
- Owner: Delhi Metro
- Locale: Delhi
- Termini: Dwarka-Kakrola; Dhansa Bus Stand
- Stations: 4

Service
- Type: Rapid Transit
- Operator: Delhi Metro Rail Corporation

History
- Opened: 4 October 2019; 7 years ago
- Last extension: 18 September 2021

Technical
- Line length: 5.19 kilometers (3.22 mi)
- Character: Underground & Elevated
- Track gauge: 1,435 mm (4 ft 8 1/2 in) standard gauge
- Electrification: 25 kV 50 Hz AC from overhead catenary

The Grey Line (Line 9) is a line of the Delhi Metro that connects Dwarka-Kakrola to Dhansa Bus Stand located in Najafgarh in the western part of Delhi, India. The total length of the line is 5.19 kilometers (3.22 mi). It is the shortest line on the entire network, with only 4 stations.

The line has a single interchange with the rest of the Delhi Metro network at Dwarka-Kakrola station, connecting to the Blue Line. The Grey Line uses 1,435 mm (4.708 ft) standard-gauge tracks, while the Blue Line was built with wider 1,676 mm (5.499 ft) broad-gauge tracks.

The line uses the same rolling stock as the Pink and Magenta lines, although no platform screen doors (PSDs) have been installed due to low ridership projections.

The Dwarka Station is the only station in the network to have five platforms on the same level (2 are for the Blue Line, 2 for the Grey Line, and the third one connects the Blue Line with the Najafgarh Depot).

== History ==
The Dwarka to Najafgarh section was opened to the public on 4 October 2019. A further extension to Dhansa Bus Stand was scheduled to open in December 2020, but construction was delayed by the COVID-19 pandemic. The extension was eventually inaugurated on 18 September 2021.

== Stations ==
The stations for the Grey Line are:

Grey Line
| # | Station Name | | Phase | Opening | Interchange Connenction | Station Layout | Platform Level Type |
| # | English | Hindi | Phase | Opening | Interchange Connenction | Station Layout | Platform Level Type |
|---|---|---|---|---|---|---|---|
| 1 | Dwarka-Kakrola | द्वारका-ककरोला | III | 4 October 2019 | Blue Line | Elevated | Side |
| 2 | Nangli | नंगली | III | 4 October 2019 | None | Elevated | Side |
| 3 | Najafgarh | नजफ़गढ़ | III | 4 October 2019 | None | Underground | Side |
| 4 | Dhansa Bus Stand | ढांसा बस स्टैंड | III | 18 September 2021 | Green Line Phase V(B) to Nangloi | Underground | Side |

Najafgarh station was initially planned in a regular rectangular shape. However, when construction work began on the ground, some of the private land required for the project could not be acquired. As a result, the Delhi Metro had no other option but to plan the station using the land available to it. The station was consequently built in a dumbbell shape, with its width narrowing by a few metres in the middle.

== Train info ==
Grey Line
| Rakes | Hyundai Rotem |
| Train Length | 6 |
| Train Gauge | 1,435 mm (4 ft 8 1/2 in) standard gauge |
| Electrification | 25 kV 50 Hz AC (nominal) from overhead catenary |
| Train's Maximum Speed | 100 km/h |
| Train Operation | Dwarka - Dhansa Bus Stand |

== Extensions ==
"Phase-V: Dhansa-Jhajjhar Metro": The Grey Line Delhi Metro from Dhansa Bus Stand to Jhajjar City is proposed in the phase V, which is awaiting approval

== See also ==
- Transport in Delhi
- Transport in Haryana
