= John Zegrus =

Japanese mystery man

John Allen Kuchar Zegrus (ジョン・アレン・カッチャー・ジーグラス, Jon Aren Kacchā Jīgurasu) is the reported name of a man detained in 1960 in Japan for alleged document fabrication. He was dubbed the "Mystery Man" (ミステリー・マン, Misuterī Man) by Japanese news at the time, and became a prototype for some urban legends.

== Incident ==
In October 1959, a man recorded as John Allen Kuchar Zegrus, 36, entered Japan with his Korean wife. Three months later, he was arrested by the Tokyo Metropolitan Police, suspected of identity fraud. He tried to cash a ¥200,000 (equivalent to ¥1 million or US$8,156 in 2024) cheque and a $140 (around 50,400 yen at the time) traveller's cheque at the Japanese office of Chase Manhattan Bank, and ¥100,000 (equivalent to ¥617,304 or US$4,078 in 2024) at the Japanese office of Bank of Korea.

The case was investigated by Atsuyuki Sassa of the Tokyo Metropolitan Police Department Public Security Bureau (TMPD Public Security Bureau), who later wrote about Zegrus in his memoirs. Although his passport contained the stamps of Japanese embassies in different East Asian countries, the passport was determined to be counterfeit. A visa was issued by the Japanese embassy in Taipei, now reorganized as the Japan–Taiwan Exchange Association.

According to the records, Zegrus said he was "born in the US, moved to the UK through Czechoslovakia and Germany, and attended high school there. During World War II, he was a pilot of the Royal Air Force, and was once captured by the Germans. After the war, he lived in Latin America. Later, he became a spy for the Americans in South Korea, served as a pilot in Thailand and Vietnam, and after that, he worked for the United Arab Republic. He arrived in Japan for a secret mission, which included recruiting Japanese military volunteers for the United Arab Republic." After contacting the mentioned countries, it was ruled that the information was not based on any facts, and the seals in his pseudo-passport were proven to be fabricated.

On 10 August 1960, Tokyo District Court reviewed the case and sentenced Zegrus to one year in prison. After the announcement, he attempted suicide by cutting his veins with a piece of glass secretly brought by him to the court.

After his release, Zegrus was deported from Japan to Hong Kong, from where he was recorded to enter the region. His wife was deported to South Korea.

== Urban legends ==
In the August 15, 1960 issue of The Province, a Canadian newspaper, the story was reported with some alterations. In an article titled "Man with his own country", the newspaper claimed that John Allen Kuchar Zegrus was "a naturalized Ethiopian and an intelligence agent for Colonel Nasser", and carried a passport "issued at Tamanrasset, the capital of Taured south of the Sahara". Taured is likely Tuareg misspelled, and Tamanrasset is an actual province in Algeria. A text in "Taured language" written with Latin characters was cited by the newspaper. On 29 July 1960, the story in this form was mentioned in the British House of Commons, when it was cited by Robert Mathew as an argument that "passports are not very good security checks".

The case was mentioned in books by Jacques Bergier. According to his version of the story, a person from Taured, a country in Eastern Africa which "stretched from Mauritania to Sudan and included a large part of Algeria", was arrested in 1954 in Japan during a passport check. He was placed in a psychiatric hospital, where it was revealed that he came to "buy arms for the true Arab Legion".

In 1981, the story was mentioned in a book, The Directory of Possibilities, by Colin Wilson and John Grant, with Tuareg misspelled again as Taured.

A story featured on Japanese websites dedicated to urban legends and occult stories tells that a "man from another dimension" arrived at Haneda Airport in 1954. He possessed a passport from the fictional country "Taured". When asked to point out his home nation on a map, he pointed to Andorra. He was placed in a hotel with two guards for investigation, but was nowhere to be found the following morning.
