= Delhi Transport Corporation =

Public transport corporation (bus) in Delhi, India

- Founded: 1 May 1948; 78 years ago
- Headquarters: DTC Headquarters, I.P. Estate, New Delhi
- Service area: Delhi, Noida, Ghaziabad, Gurgaon, Faridabad, and Bahadurgarh
- Service type: Bus transport network
- Routes: 606: 259: DTC; 209: DIMTS; 138: DTC and DIMTS both
- Depots: 37
- Fleet: 7683: Tata-Marcopolo AC Starbus; Tata-Marcopolo Non-AC Starbus; Ashok Leyland ULF Non-AC; Ashok Leyland ULF AC; Tata Urban electric bus; Switch Mobility EiV 12; JBM Eco-Life e12
- Daily ridership: 3.6 million for DTC and DIMTS combined (February 2023) and 2.472 million for DTC (December 2022)
- Fuel type: CNG and Electric
- Operator: Government of Delhi
- Chief executive: Niharika Rai (Chairman); Jitender Yadav (Managing Director)
- Employees: 30591 (as of 31 March 2022)
- Website: dtc.delhi.gov.in

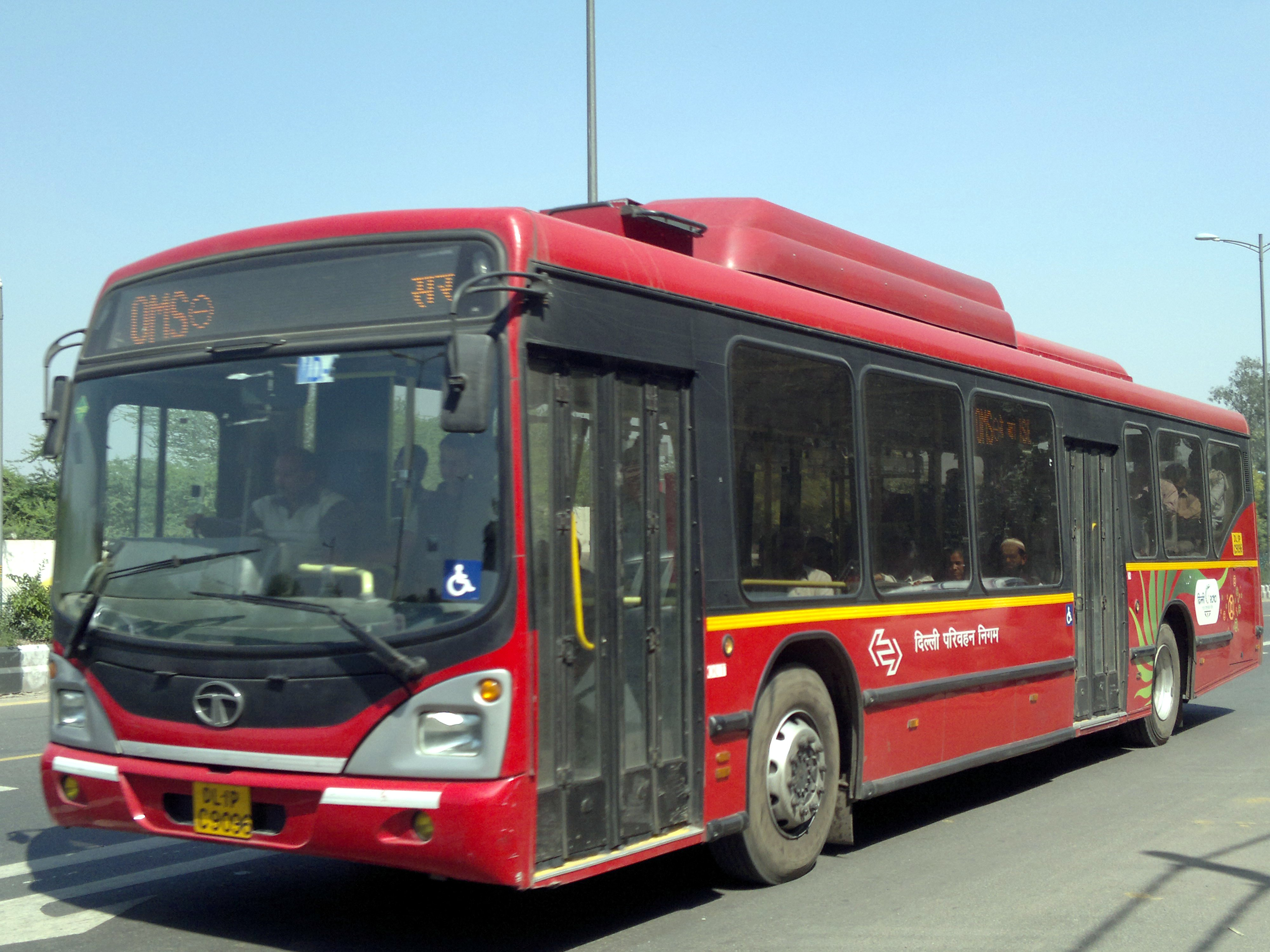
A DTC AC CNG Bus

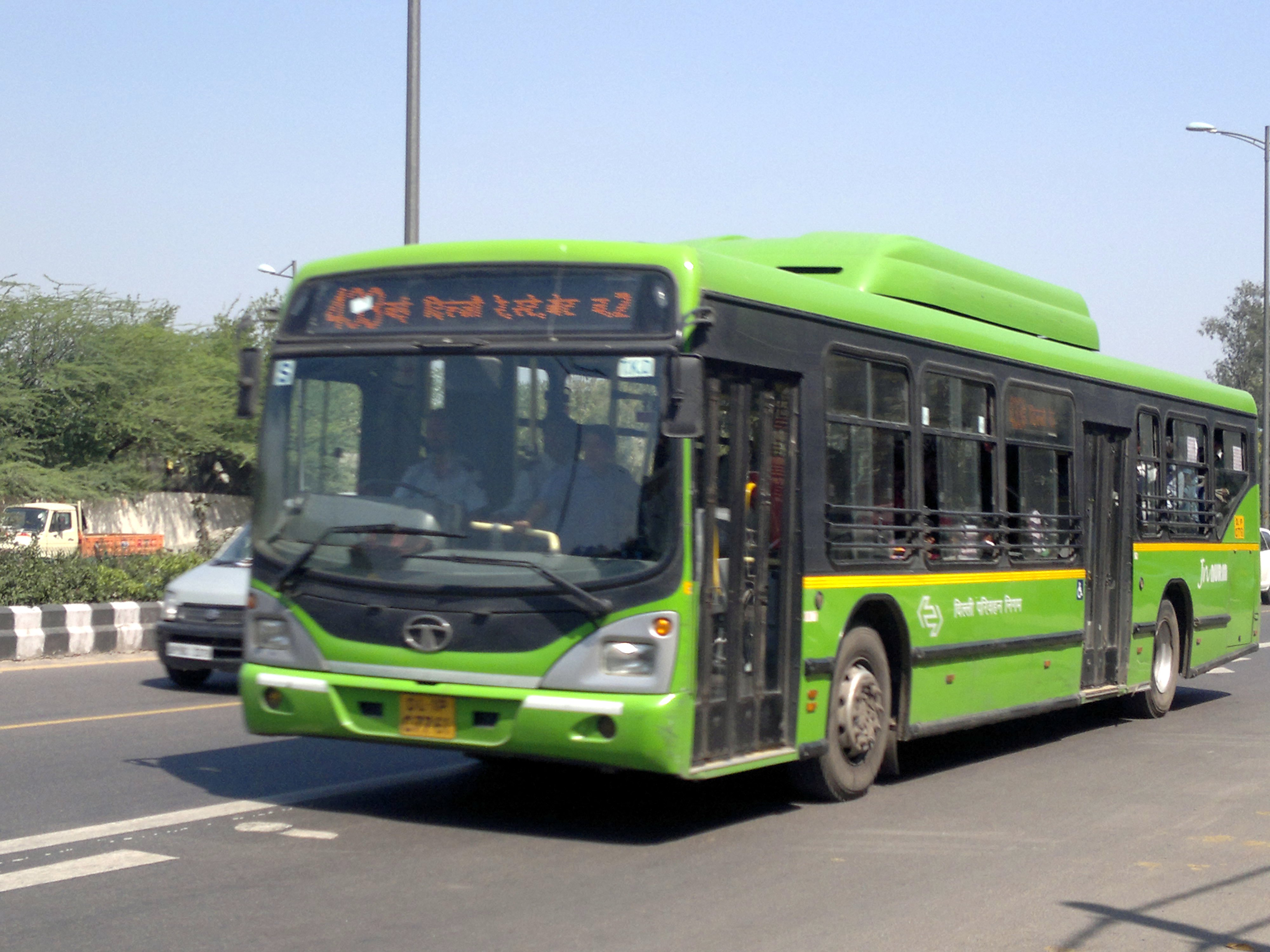
A DTC Non-AC CNG Bus

The Delhi Transport Corporation (DTC) is a public sector passenger road transport corporation that manages bus services in the National Capital Territory of Delhi, India. It was incorporated in November 1971 as a wholly owned corporation of the Government of India to provide an efficient, economical and properly coordinated road transport service in Delhi. Its administrative control was transferred to the Department of Transport, Government of Delhi with effect from 5 August 1996.

As of November 2023, DTC was the largest CNG-powered bus service operator in the world. In April 2026, DTC has the largest electric bus fleet amongst all public transport operators in India. It operates approximately 6,300 buses, of which 4,538 are electric and 1,759 are CNG. It operates from 37 depots and three Interstate Bus Terminals in Delhi: Kashmere Gate ISBT, Anand Vihar ISBT, and Sarai Kale Khan ISBT.

== History ==
The Ministry of Transport, Government of India, took over local bus services in Delhi in May 1948 when the services offered by the incumbent service provider Gwalior and Northern India Transport Company Ltd. was found to be insufficient for the growing demand. For this purpose, a Delhi Road Transport Authority was constituted under the Road Transport Corporation Act, 1950. This authority became an undertaking of Municipal Corporation of Delhi by an Act of Parliament in April 1958.

In 1971, on the recommendations of a working group of the Planning Commission, which concluded that Delhi Transport as an extension of the Municipal Corporation of Delhi had not been functioning efficiently and adequately that was leading to leakage of revenue and very high operational costs, the Government of India took over management of the undertaking by passing the Delhi Road Transport Laws (Amendment) Act. The newly constituted Delhi Transport Corporation took over assets and liabilities from the DTU up until 2 November 1971.

The administrative control of DTC was transferred to the Department of Transport, Government of Delhi, with effect from 5 August 1996 after writing off all the Union government loans along with the interest accrued on them (amounting to ₹2,123 crore (US$230 million)).

== Overview ==
The objectives of the Delhi Transport Corporation are defined under Section 18 of the Delhi Road Transport Laws (Amendment) Act, 1971, in conjunction with Section 22 of the Road Transport Corporation Act, 1950. These objectives encompass the following responsibilities:

- To provide an efficient, economical, reliable and properly coordinated system of road transport in Delhi and any extended area (while acting on business principles).
- To achieve a high level operational efficiency.
- To charge fares not exceeding those prescribed by the State Under Section 43(1)(i) of the Motor Vehicles Act.
- To attain financial self-sufficiency.

=== Organizational Structure ===
The management of the Delhi Transport Corporation is overseen by a Board of Directors, which includes the Chairman-cum-Managing Director (CMD) and other directors appointed by the Government of Delhi. The CMD, serving as the organization's Chief Executive, is responsible for managing day-to-day operations. This role is supported by a team comprising four Chief General Managers, six Regional Managers, and Depot Managers.

== Services ==
DTC has an extensive network of bus routes spread all over Delhi. A few routes traverse the neighbouring cities of Noida, Ghaziabad, Gurgaon, and Faridabad. As of June 2023, of the 606 total bus routes in Delhi, 259 were operated by DTC, 209 were operated by DIMTS, and 138 routes were operated on by both the authorities under the Department of Transport's 'Unified Time Table'. These routes are serviced by 7,135 buses, with 4,088 of them under DTC, out of 37 depots and 3 ISBTs. The average number of trips in FY 2021-22 was 31,084 per day. The number of routes being operated by the corporation has been steadily falling over the years under the Delhi government's policy of a 50:50 ratio of DTC buses and cluster buses on every route.

DTC also provides various other provisions like night services, tourist services, and airport express services. It also provides buses to Delhi Police and used to do so for some schools (however, this was stopped in July 2022).

=== Inter-state bus services ===
Until 2010, the Delhi Transport Corporation (DTC) operated interstate bus services to cities in North India. These services were discontinued after the fleet transitioned to CNG, a fuel that was not widely available in other states at the time. As of 2023, the Delhi government plans to relaunch interstate services with a fleet of 1,600 premium buses connecting major cities like Dehradun, Jaipur, Shimla, Chandigarh, Amritsar, Jammu, and Agra with Delhi. Under this plan, DTC will manage the services in collaboration with selected private operators. The fleet will include 1,200 electric buses designed for routes up to 200 kilometers (120 miles) and 400 BS-VI CNG buses for longer distances.

== Fleet ==
As of March 2025, DTC has a fleet of 4,359 buses, with 3,109 CNG buses and 1,250 electric buses. This makes its fleet the largest CNG bus fleet in the world, and the largest electric bus fleet in India. The buses are dispatched from 37 bus depots across Delhi. With Delhi's total bus fleet numbering 7,135, 57% of these are operated by the DTC.

DTC has witnessed two major fleet improvements in its history. The first significant overhaul to its fleet happened in anticipation of the 2010 Commonwealth Games, when DTC received 3,125 new CNG low-floor buses (2500 first, followed by 625), which increased its fleet size to a high of 6,204 buses. This marked the first time DTC acquired low-floor buses, and since then, all subsequent orders have exclusively been for this type of bus. The new buses consisted of air-conditioned and non-air-conditioned Tata-Marcopolo low-floor Starbuses and Ashok Leyland ultra-low-floor (ULF) buses. The air-conditioned buses were painted red, while the non-air-conditioned ones were painted green, making them easily distinguishable. These new buses had features such as automatic transmission, power steering, ramps for disabled people, and stop-request buttons located on grab bars. With the introduction of these buses, Delhi's fleet of 2,400 privately owned "killer" Blueline buses was gradually phased out. In 2011, DTC planned to make use of biogas generated from sewage treatment plants to run its buses.

The second major upgrade to DTC's fleet began in 2021 when the Delhi government decided to exclusively procure electric buses going forward. Subsequently, with deliveries in multiple batches, DTC's fleet of electric buses has grown to 1,752, making it the largest e-bus fleet in India. The new buses feature digital ticketing, GPS, CCTV, and panic buttons, all connected to a two-way centralised command and control center at Kashmere Gate. The Delhi transport department plans to deploy 2,080 more electric buses in Delhi in 2025.

== Depots ==
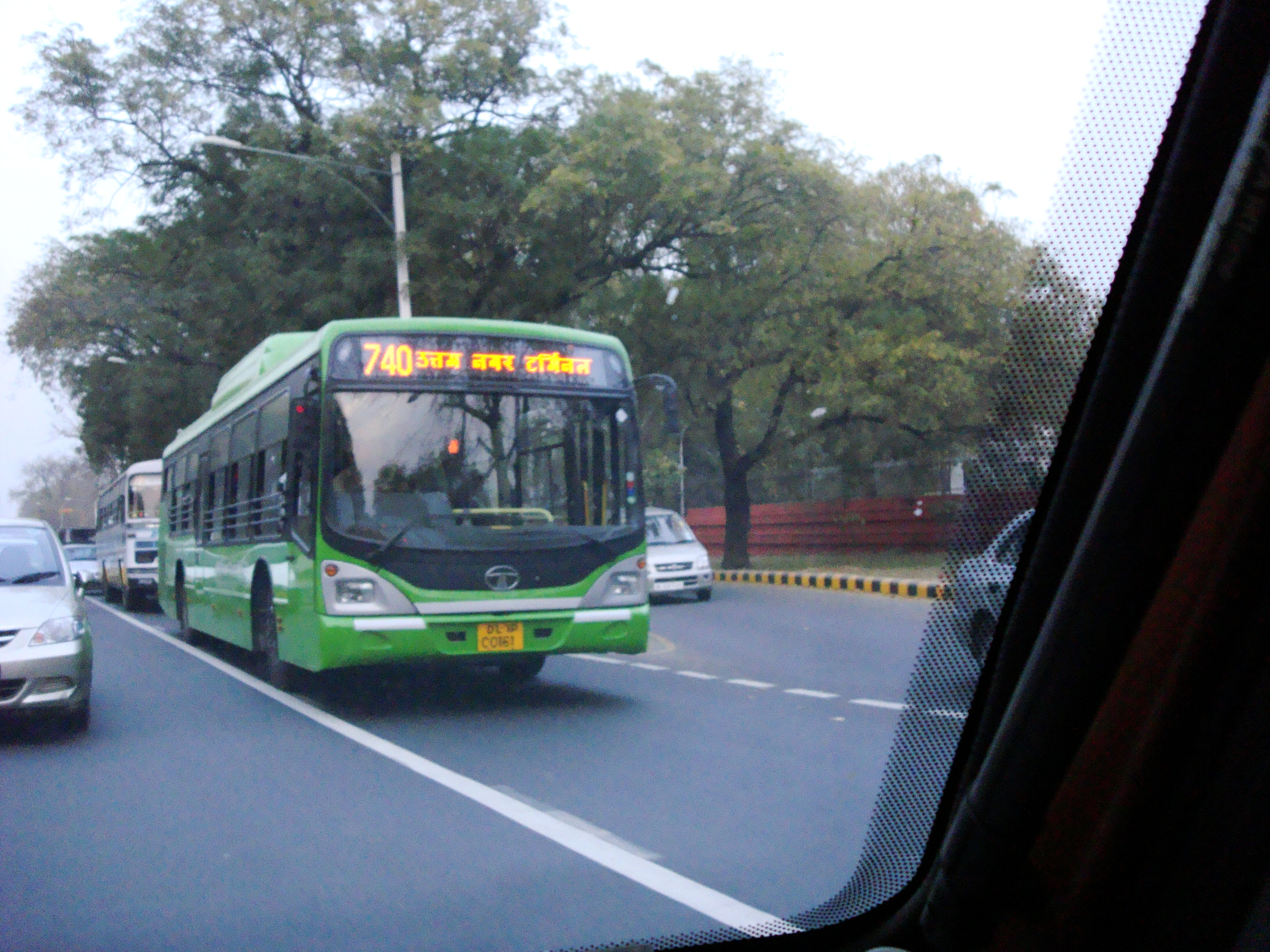
A DTC Bus on Route 740

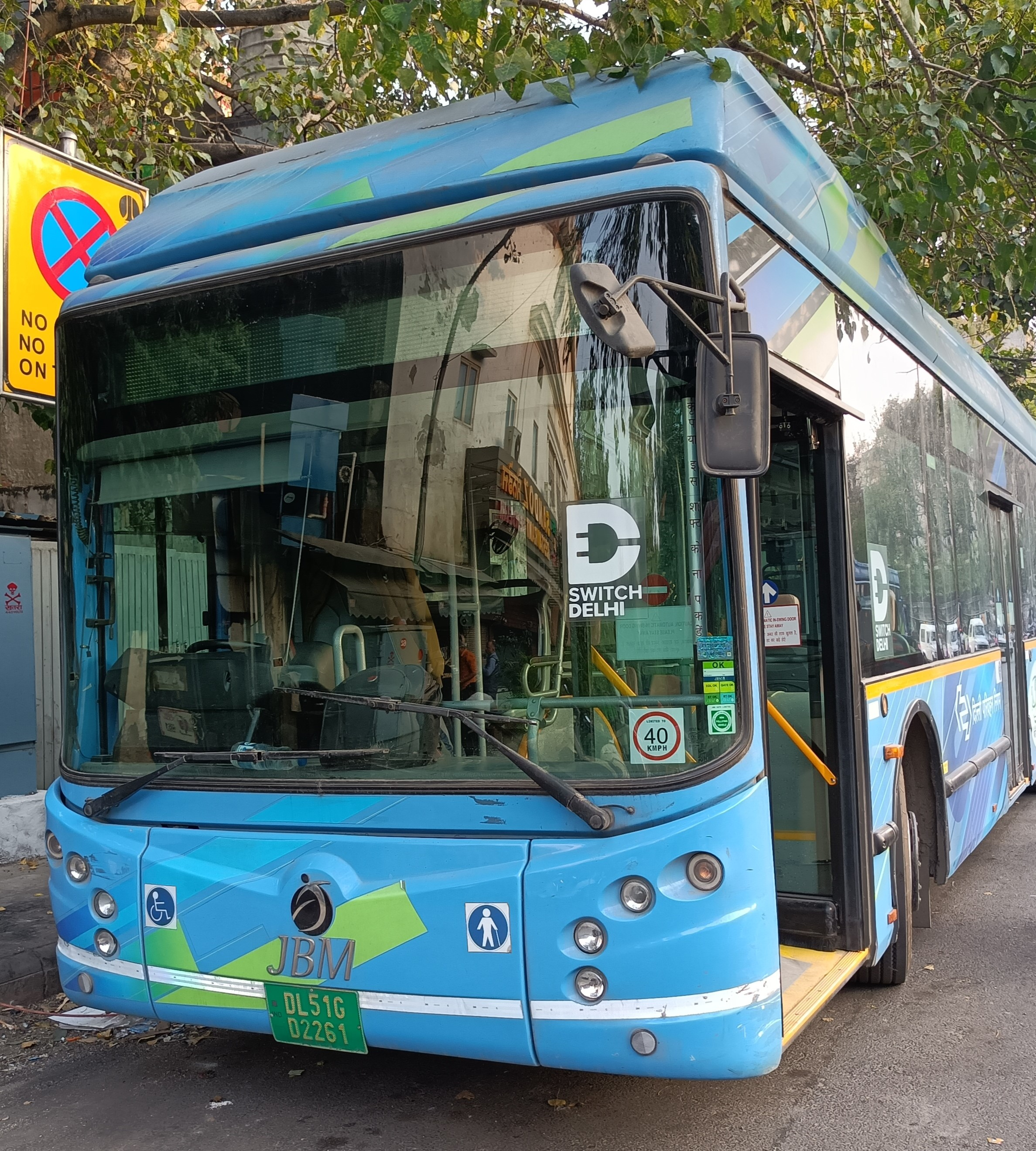
An AC Electric Bus of the DTC

DTC manages its operations from 37 bus depots, which are organised into four regions: East, North, South, and West. 36 of these depots are located in Delhi, with 1 located in the neighbouring city of Noida. These facilities handle regular maintenance and cleaning of buses. To complement DTC's existing depots, the Delhi government is constructing 9 additional bus depots at Kirari, East Vinod Nagar 2, Narela, Daurala, Burari, Savda Ghevra, Kapashera, Gadaipur, and Chattarpur.

Following are the depots:

Number	Depot Name
1	Khanpur Depot
2	GTB Nagar Depot
3	Dichaun Kalan Depot
4	Dwarka Sector 2 Depot
5	Dwarka Sector 8 Depot
6	Dwarka Sector 26 Depot
7	Mayur Vihar II Depot
8	Ghazipur Depot
9	Jahangirpuri Depot
10	Janakpuri-1 Depot
11	Janakpuri-2 Depot
12	Patparganj Depot
13	Okhla Depot
14	Kanjhawla Depot
15	Keshopur Depot
16	Mayapuri Depot
17	Mundela Kalan Depot
19	Nand Nagari Depot
19	Nangloi Depot
20	Narela Depot
21	Noida Depot
22	Paschim Vihar Depot
23	Rajghat-1 Depot
24	Rajghat-2 Depot
25	Rohini Sec-37 Depot
26	Rohini-1 Depot
27	Rohini-2 Depot
28	Rohini-3 Depot
29	Rohini-4 Depot
30	Sarojini Nagar Depot
31	Shadipur-1 Depot
32	Shadipur-2 Depot
33	Srinivaspuri Depot
34	Sukhdev Vihar Depot
35	Tehkhand Depot
36	Vasant Vihar Depot
37	Wazirpur Depot

== Routes rationalisation ==
The Delhi government commissioned IIT Delhi for a 12-month bus network study from March 2026 to February 2027 "with the objective of improving efficiency, accessibility and overall service quality of Delhi Transport Corporation (DTC) buses". The route rationalisation includes 121 routes of East Zone, 181 routes of West Zone, 194 routes of North Zone as well as routes of South Zone.

DTC also plans to utilise IIT Kanpur for digitisation and artificial intelligence (AI) integration for its bus management system.

On July 5, 2026, DTC launched new route 753 ext. to improve central-west connectivity.

== Delhi Integrated Multi-Modal Transit System (DIMTS) ==
The Delhi Integrated Multi-Modal Transit System (DIMTS) is an urban transport and infrastructure development company that was established in 2006 as a 50:50 joint venture between the Government of Delhi and IDFC Foundation. As of September 2025, it operated a fleet of 2,700 buses — 1,750 CNG and 839 electric — across Delhi under the cluster scheme, categorised by their colour: orange for non-air-conditioned buses and blue for air-conditioned ones. These buses are fitted with GPS devices, which enable real-time tracking of their movement and geographic location through the automatic vehicle location (AVL) system. They are also equipped with electronic ticketing machines (ETMs) as part of an automated fare collection (AFC) system, replacing pre-printed tickets. In January 2018, the Delhi Transport Department began a trial to allow people to use Delhi Metro smart cards for purchasing tickets on these buses.

Under the cluster scheme, private concessionaires are responsible for supplying the buses, ensuring their cleaning and maintenance, and providing staff. In return, they are compensated based on an indexed cost system. This system, which includes the components mentioned below, ensures fair compensation while maintaining cost efficiency and service quality.

- A fixed component tied to the cost of the bus,
- A variable component covering fuel and maintenance costs, and
- A wage-related component adjusted according to the Consumer Price Index.

In December 2025, the Delhi government decided to transfer bus operations handled by the DIMTS to DTC by April 2026. With this, all of Delhi's functions related to bus transport would be under a single authority. Since DIMTS charged 3% of operational costs — around ₹60 crore (US$6.4 million) to ₹70 crore (US$7.5 million) — to manage operations, this move is expected to bring significant savings.

== See also ==
- Delhi Metro
- Transport in Delhi
- National Capital Region Transport Corporation
