= B. D. Chaurasia =

Indian anatomist, medical academic and writer

Bhagwan Din Chaurasia
- Born: 1 October 1937; Barigarh, British India
- Died: 5 May 1985 (aged 47)
- Education: MGM Medical College, Indore (MBBS, MS); Jiwaji University (PhD)
- Occupations: Anatomist, medical educator and writer
- Years active: 1965 – 1985
- Medical career
- Institutions: MGM Medical College; Gandhi Medical College, Bhopal; Gajara Raja Medical College
- Sub-specialties: Human Anatomy
- Notable works: Human Anatomy
- Awards: Dr. Kailash Nath Katju Award of Science

Bhagwan Din Chaurasia (1937 – 1985) was an Indian anatomist, medical educator and writer for medical education. He is best known for his widely acclaimed textbook, Human Anatomy, which remains a popular anatomy resource for medical students in India and abroad.

== Early life and education ==
Bhagwan Din Chaurasia was born on 1 October 1937 in Barigarh, a town now in Chhatarpur district of Madhya Pradesh, India. He was raised in the farming family of Ramadin and Radharani Chaurasia.

In 1954 he completed his early education from Ewing Christian College, Allahabad. He gained his MBBS degree from Mahatma Gandhi Memorial Medical College, Indore, in 1960, and five years later obtained a Master of Surgery (MS) in anatomy from the same college. In 1975 he completed his PhD from Jiwaji University, Gwalior.

== Career ==
Chaurasia started his teaching career as a demonstrator in the department of anatomy at MGM Medical College, Indore. He worked there for three years followed by a two-year stint as a lecturer in anatomy at the Gandhi Medical College (GMC), Bhopal. In 1968, he joined the Gajara Raja Medical College (GRMC), Gwalior, as a Reader in Anatomy, and worked there until his death.

Chaurasia's class notes on the human brain, with handwritten diagrams, became very popular and served as the foundation for his first publication. As photocopying and typewriting were expensive, and to make education accessible, he cyclostyled his notes and sold them to students for ₹10 for each booklet. His work caught the attention of CBS Publishers in New Delhi, who invited him to write a comprehensive textbook on human anatomy.

In 1979, inspired by his mentor professors Inderbir Singh from Rohtak and S. C. Gupta from Jiwaji University, he published Human Anatomy in which he incorporated riddles and rhymes, in the hope that students would not find learning anatomy tiresome and boring. He dedicated the book to his teacher Uma Shankar Nagayach. It quickly became an essential resource for medical students. The first edition was reprinted annually until 1988. The second edition was published in 1989 with five reprints till 1994. The eighth edition was published in 2020. After 45 years, it remains in use, with the ninth edition in 2024 edited by Krishna Garg. The book combined simple language, concise explanation with visually engaging and easily reproducible diagrams; which addressed the lack of accessible and student-friendly anatomy resource. It also had flowcharts and clinical correlations for better understanding. It has been translated into multiple languages and remains useful across various medical disciplines, including dentistry, physiotherapy, and occupational therapy. He authored Handbook of General Anatomy which also became popular.

Chaurasia published over 60 research papers in national and international journals. He attended academic societies and served as a member on the advisory board of the publications such as the Acta Anatomica from 1981 and on the editorial board of Bionature. His research spanned diverse topics; including anatomy, human variations, congenital anomalies, anthropology, neurology, behavioural sciences, human genetics and botany.

Chaurasia never married. He had a dog named Rani. Munne Miyan was his helper. He died on 5 May 1985, most likely due to myocardial infarction.

== Recognition ==
Chaurasia was elected as a Fellow of the National Academy of Medical Sciences (FAMS) in 1982 and was posthumously awarded the Dr. Kailash Nath Katju Award of Science by the Government of Madhya Pradesh. His birthday, 1 October, is celebrated as Medical Teacher's Day in Madhya Pradesh.

== Selected publications ==
=== Articles ===
- Chaurasia, B.D.; Goswami, H.K. (1975). "Functional asymmetry in the face". Acta Anatomica. 91 (1): 154–160. doi:10.1159/000144379. ISSN 0001-5180. PMID 1136705. (Co-author)
- Chaurasia, B. D. (1977). "Forebrain in human anencephaly". Anatomischer Anzeiger. 142 (5): 471–478. ISSN 0003-2786. PMID 607812.
- Chaurasia, B.D.; Agarwal, B.M. (1979). "Helical structure of the human umbilical cord". Acta Anatomica. 103 (2): 226–230. doi:10.1159/000145013. ISSN 0001-5180. PMID 419931. (Co-author)
- Goswami, H. K.; Chaurasia, B. D. (August 1980). "Classification of inherited brachydactylies". Journal of Medical Genetics. 17 (4): 324–325. doi:10.1136/jmg.17.4.324-b. ISSN 0022-2593. PMC 1048584. PMID 7205911. (Co-author)

=== Books ===
- B. D. Chaurasia's Handbook of General Anatomy. CBS Publishers. 1978.
