= Noida Sector 18 metro station =

Metro station in Delhi, India

Noida Sector 18

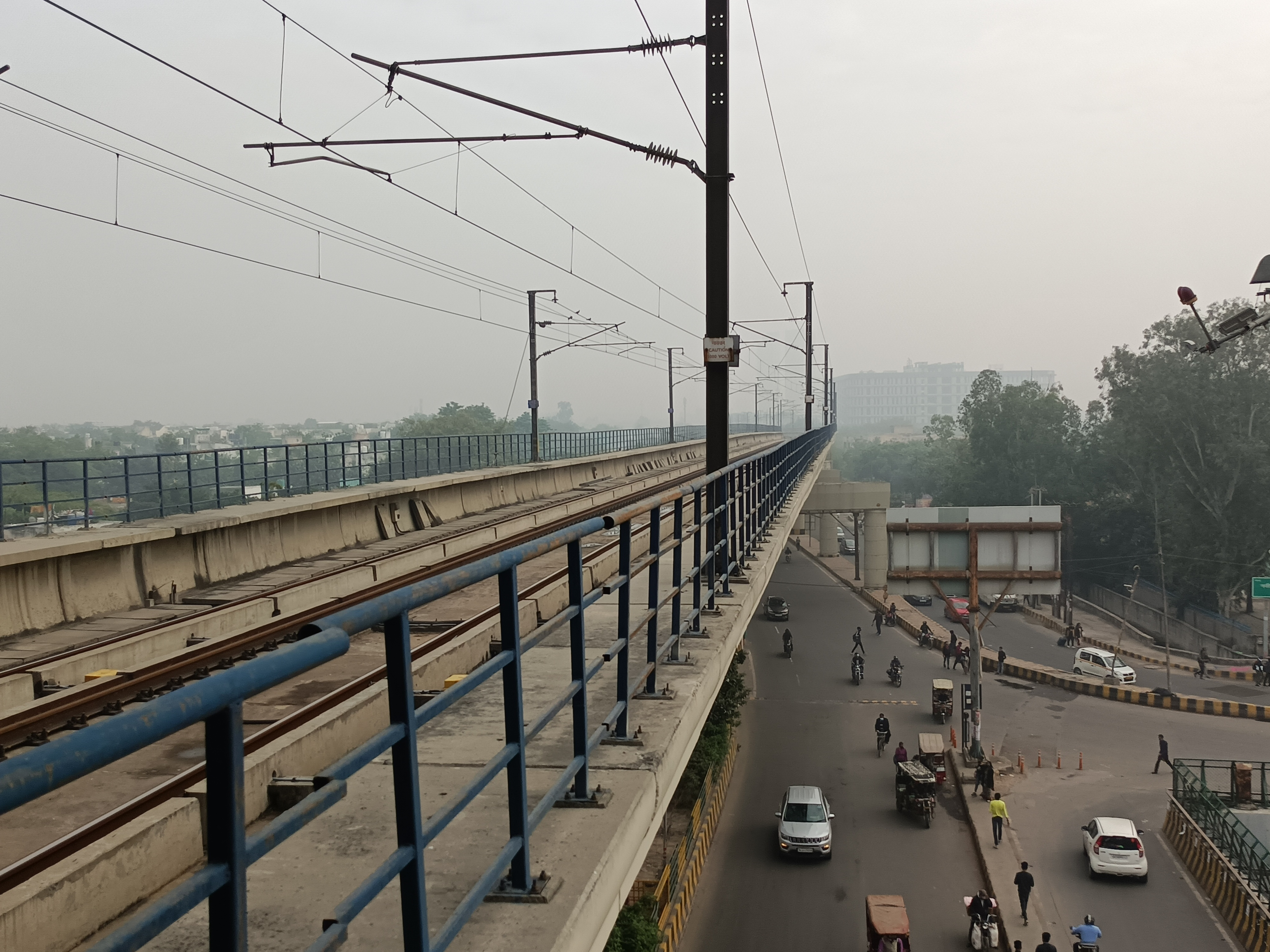
- Viaduct - Noida Sector-18 metro station

General information
- Location: Captain Vijayant Thapar Marg, Sector 18, Noida, Uttar Pradesh 201301
- Coordinates: 28°34′15″N 77°19′34″E
- System: Delhi Metro station
- Owner: Delhi Metro Rail Corporation Ltd. (DMRC)
- Line: Blue Line
- Platforms: Side platform; Platform-1 → Noida Electronic City; Platform-2 → Dwarka Sector 21
- Tracks: 2

Construction
- Structure type: Elevated
- Platform levels: 2
- Accessible: Yes

Other information
- Station code: NSET

History
- Opened: 12 November 2009; 17 years ago
- Electrified: 25 kV 50 Hz AC through overhead catenary

Passengers
- 2015: Average 21,357 /day 662,079 (Month of Jan)

Services
Preceding station	Delhi Metro	Following station
Noida Sector 16 towards Dwarka Sector 21	Blue Line	Botanical Garden towards Noida Electronic City
Route map
Location

Noida Sector 18 is an elevated metro station on the Blue Line of the Delhi Metro, located in Noida, Uttar Pradesh. It serves the Sector 18 commercial and shopping district, which includes several major retail destinations such as The Great India Place, DLF Mall of India and Atta Market, a popular street-shopping area in Noida.

== Station layout ==
L2	Side platform | Doors will open on the left
L2	Platform 1 South East bound	Towards → Noida Electronic City; Next Station: Botanical Garden Change at the next station for Magenta Line
L2	Platform 2 Westbound	Towards ← Dwarka Sector 21; Next Station: Noida Sector 16
L2	Side platform | Doors will open on the left
L1	Concourse	Fare control, station agent, Metro Card vending machines, crossover
G	Street Level	Exit/Entrance

== Market place ==
The area surrounding Noida Sector 18 metro station is home to two prominent shopping areas, Sector 18 Market and Atta Market. Sector 18 Market has a variety of retail outlets, restaurants, cafes, food stalls and electronics shops. Located across the road, Atta Market is a popular street-shopping destination known for its affordable clothing, footwear, accessories and street food. It attracts shoppers from Noida and other parts of the Delhi-NCR region.

== Facilities ==
List of available ATMs at Noida Sector 18 metro station are HDFC Bank and Punjab National Bank.

== Connections ==
=== Bus ===
Delhi Transport Corporation bus routes number 33, 33A, 33EXT, 34A, 319, 319A, 323, 347, 443, 491 and 493 serve the station from the Sector 28 bus stop nearby.

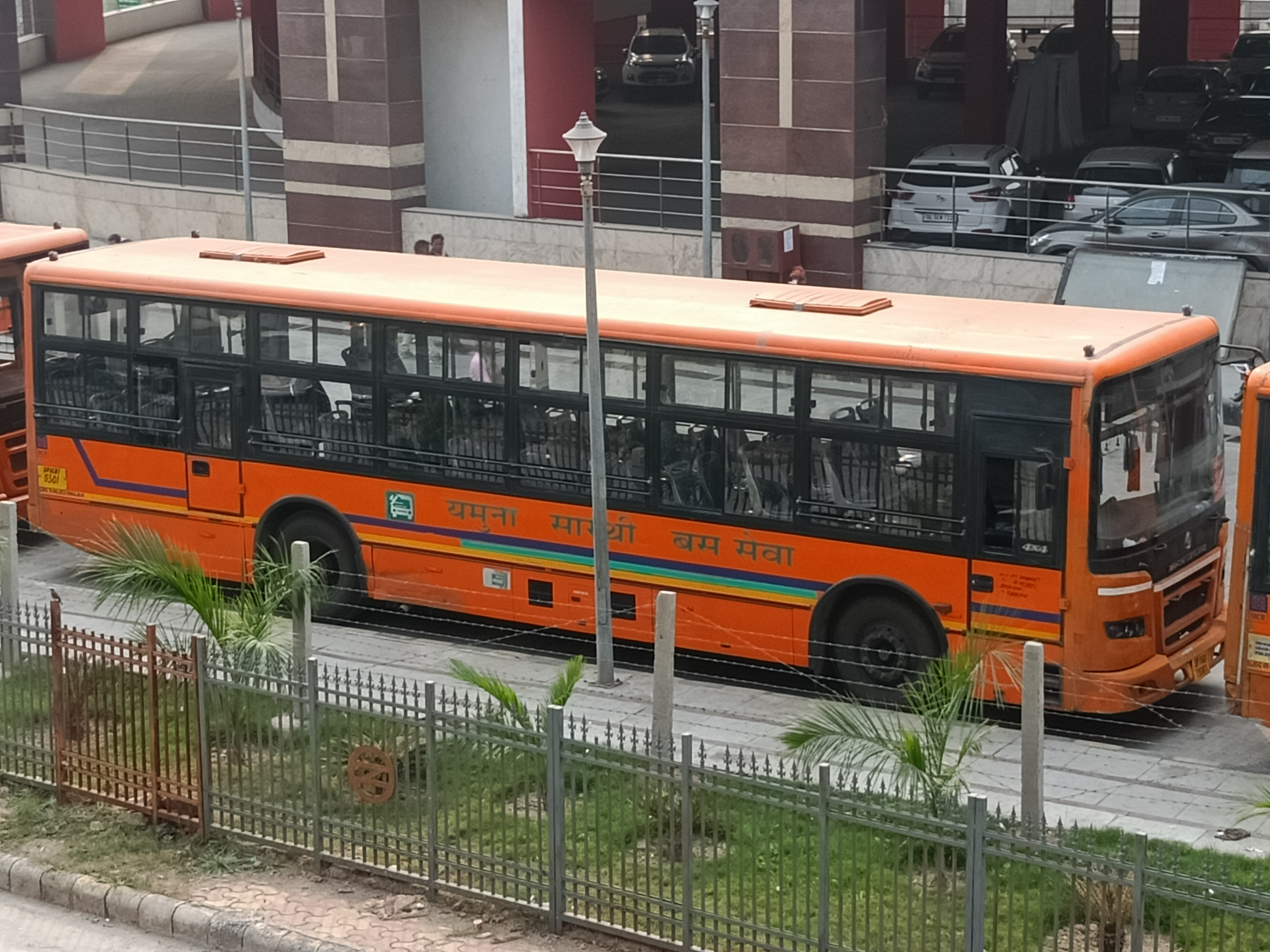
A bus of the "Yamuna Sarthi Bus Seva" at the Botanical Garden metro station

In July 2015, the Yamuna Expressway Industrial Development Authority (YEIDA), in association with a special purpose vehicle, introduced the Yamuna Sarthi bus service to connect Noida and Greater Noida with areas along the Yamuna Expressway. The service initially used CNG-powered semi-low-floor buses, each with a capacity of 50 passengers, operating between Botanical Garden metro station and Sector 22D in the YEIDA area. The planned circular route covered 13 stops: Botanical Garden metro station, The Great India Place, Amity University, ATS Village in Sector 93A, KPMG, Kondli, Pari Chowk, Parsvnath P3, the YEIDA office, Gautam Buddha University, Galgotias University, Dankaur and Sector 22D.

== See also ==
- List of Delhi Metro stations
- Transport in Delhi
- Delhi Metro Rail Corporation
- Delhi Suburban Railway
- List of rapid transit systems in India
