= Ewing Christian College =

Autonomous college of the University of Allahabad, India

- Former name: Allahabad Christian College
- Motto: Study to show thyself approved unto God
- Type: Autonomous
- Established: 1902; 124 years ago
- Affiliations: University of Allahabad, UGC
- Principal: Dr. A.S. Moses
- Location: Prayagraj, Uttar Pradesh, India; 25.2539°N 81.5044°E
- Campus: 4.2 acres (17,000 m^{2}) Urban
- Website: www.ecc.ac.in

Ewing Christian College (ECC), formerly Allahabad Christian College, is an autonomous constituent college of University of Allahabad, located in Prayagraj, Uttar Pradesh, India.

The college was established in 1902 by Arthur Henry Ewing, a prominent Presbyterian missionary.

The college was conferred with the status of College with Potential for Excellence by the University Grants Commission in 2005 and accredited by the National Assessment and Accreditation Council (NAAC).

== Campus ==
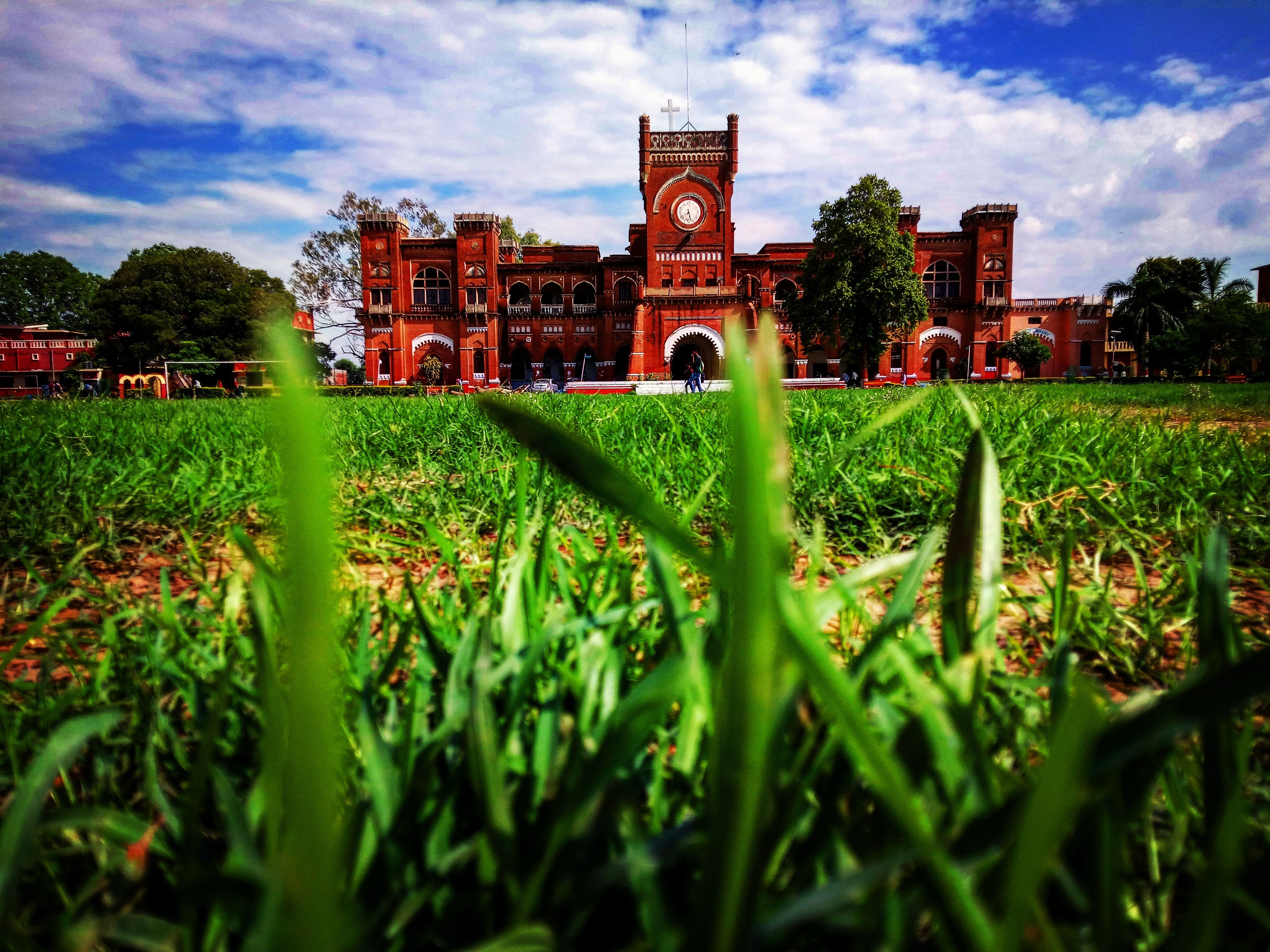
Ewing Christian College

The campus is located on the northern bank of the Yamuna river near Sangam on the southern part of Prayagraj city. Spread on a campus of 42 acres (170,000 m^{2}), the college opened its agricultural economics extension department on the other side of the river, which soon developed into Allahabad Agricultural Institute, now Sam Higginbottom University of Agriculture, Technology and Sciences (SHUATS).

== Academics ==
The academic structure is composed of three faculties, the Faculty of Arts, Faculty of Science and Faculty of Teacher education, which are subdivided into various departments and eight self-financed centers/departments.

== Notable alumni ==
- Surya Bahadur Thapa, 24th Prime Minister of Nepal (1963, 1965, 1979, 1997, 2003)
- Khalid Azim also known as Ashraf Ahmad, Criminal and politician
- Govind Swarup, Radio Astrophysicist
- Shanti Bhushan, Law Minister of India (1977–79)
- Keshavrao Krishnarao Datey (1912–1983), Cardiologist
- Feroze Gandhi, member of parliament (1952–60)
- Ravindra Khattree, Distinguished Professor, Statistician
- Madan Lal Khurana, Chief Minister of Delhi (1993–96)
- Panchanan Maheshwari, botanist, Fellow of the Royal Society
- J. S. Verma, Chief Justice of India (1997–98)
- Kamal Narain Singh, Chief Justice of India (1991-1991)
- Uma Nath Singh, Chief Justice of Meghalaya High Court
- Manuel Aaron, Chess Player
- Aisha Saeed, Indian Statistical Service
- Suraj Kumar Shukla, Indian Statistical Service
- Raghvendra Pandey, Indian Statistical Service
- Dr. Vijay Raj Singh, Professor, CUSB Gaya
- Kaushlendra Vikram Singh, Indian Administrative Service
- Dr. Gopal Dixit, Associate Professor, IIT Bombay
- B. D. Chaurasia, anatomist, medical educator and writer for medical education
- Rana P Singh, cancer scientist, professor JNU and Vice-Chancellor, Gautam Buddha University, Noida
