= KNH =

KNH or knh may refer to:

- The Kilgore News Herald (KNH) is an American daily newspaper based in city of Kilgore
- Kamla Nehru Hospital, a hospital located in Gandhi Medical College campus, Madhya Pradesh, India
- Kenyatta National Hospital, the oldest hospital in Kenya
- KNH, the IATA code for Kinmen Airport, Fujian, Republic of China
- KNH, the Telegram code for Kunshan South railway station, Jiangsu, China
