= Continental Hospital PLC =

Hospital in Dhaka, Bangladesh

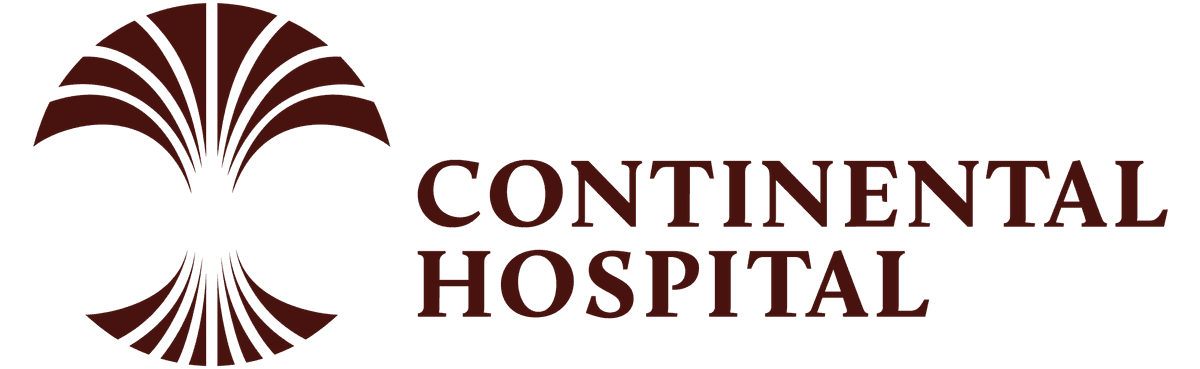

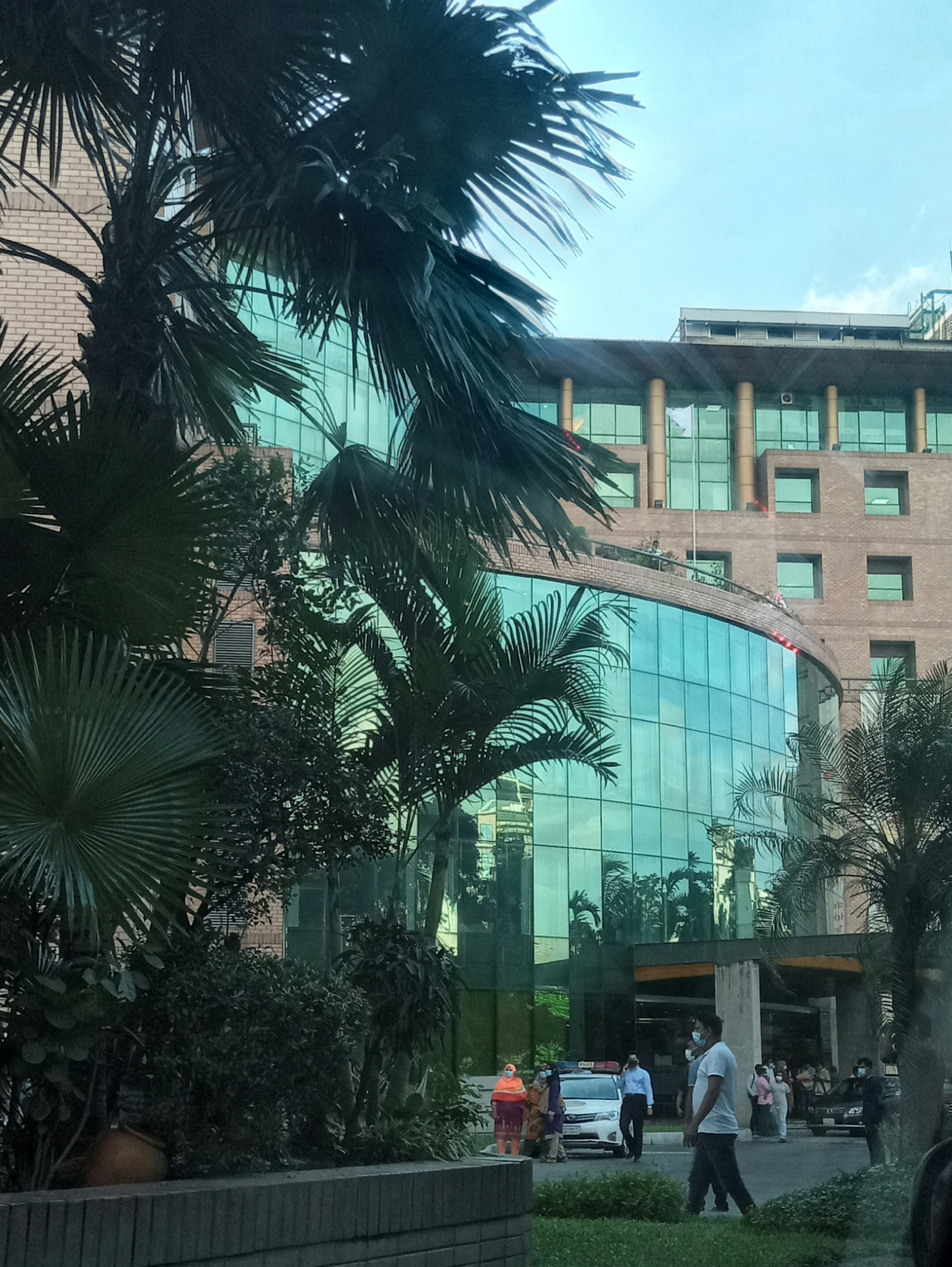

Geography
- Location: Gulshan 2, Dhaka, Bangladesh
- Coordinates: 23.8046°N 90.4158°E

Services
- Beds: 500

History
- Former name: United Hospital Limited
- Opened: 24 August 2006

Links
- Website: continental.health

Continental Hospital PLC, formerly known as United Hospital Limited, is a private hospital in Gulshan-2, Dhaka, Bangladesh. Continental Hospital PLC, along with Evercare Hospital Dhaka and Square Hospital, are considered high-end private hospitals in Dhaka. The hospital is accredited by Joint Commission International.

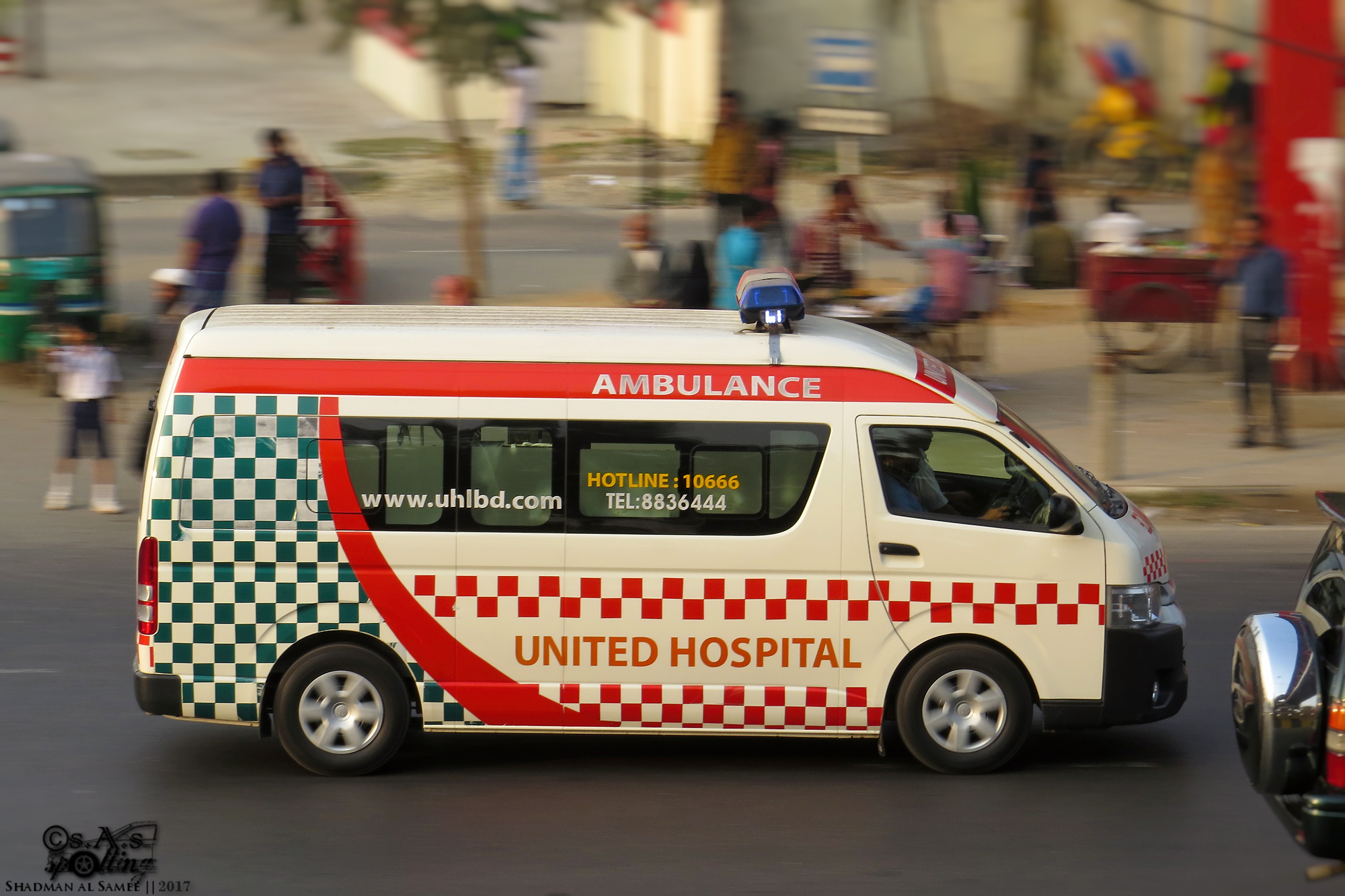
Continental Hospital Ambulance

== History ==
The hospital was conceptualized in the mid-1980s under the name Continental Hospital.

It sits on a 6-acre (2.4 ha) site on the west shore of Gulshan Lake in Dhaka. By 1997, Indian architects C P Kukreja and Associates had produced a design consisting of two square blocks, the northern one smaller than the southern one because the site tapers to the north. The blocks are rotated roughly 45 degrees from the lake shore to afford lake views from two sides of each block. The two blocks, which nearly touch at one corner, are connected by an atrium. Each block has a basement and eight floors above ground.

In 2004, Continental Hospital was purchased by a group of investors, led by United Group and later renamed to United Hospital Limited. United Group signed agreements with Malaysian healthcare provider KPJ Healthcare in late 2004 to commission and manage the hospital. The 450 bed, 450,000 square feet (42,000 m^{2}) facility opened on 24 August 2006.

On 11 January 2018, United Hospital was sued for dodging 210 million taka in taxes by the Anti-Corruption Commission. On 21 March 2018, United Hospital was fined for having expired medicine and reagents by a mobile court. Former Prime Minister, Khaleda Zia, who is imprisoned, has filed petition with the Bangladesh Sumpreme Court seeking treatment at United Hospital on 9 September 2018.

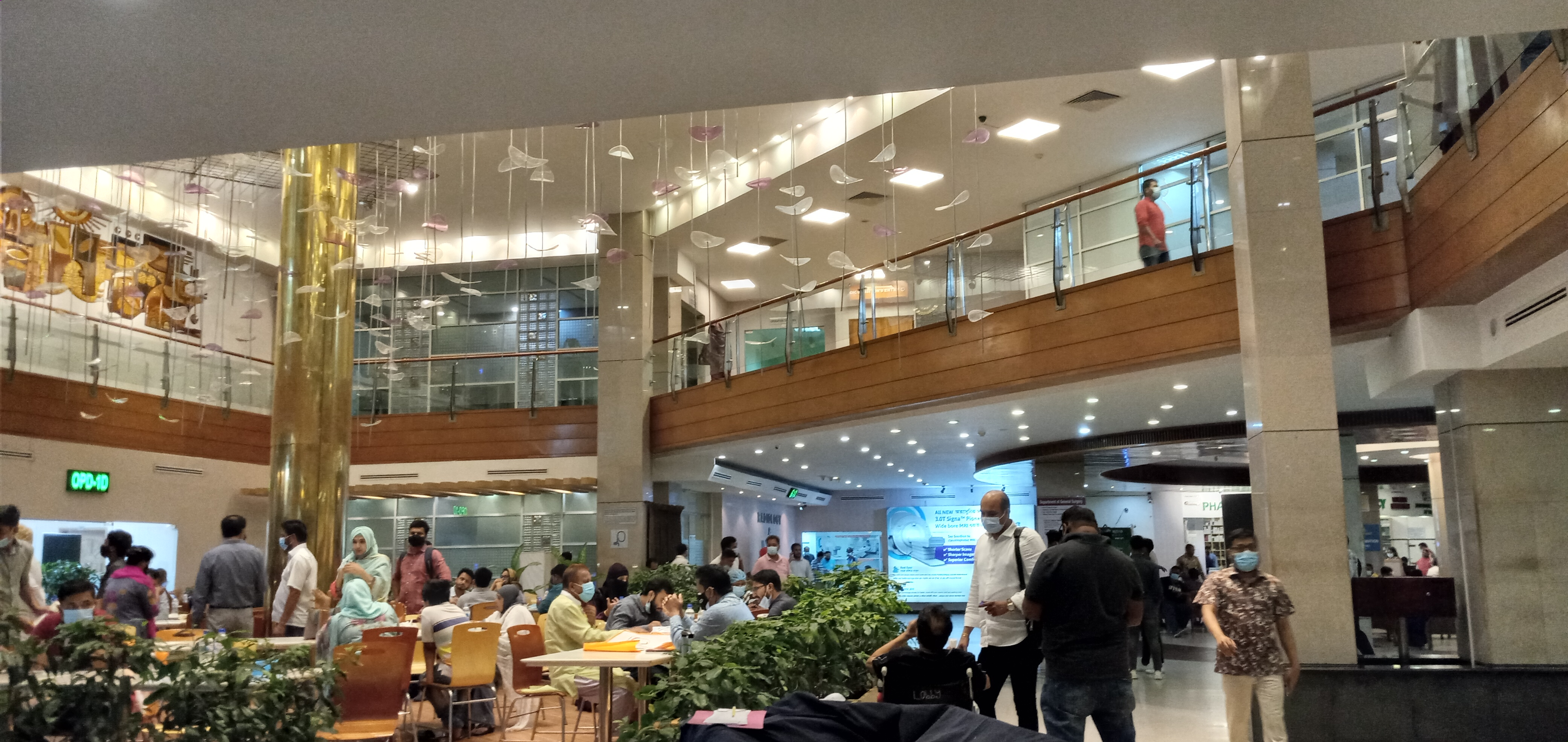
Inside view of United Hospital Limited

The first ever endoscopic laser assisted surgery in Bangladesh was performed at United Hospital Limited on 8 November 2015. Radical Cystoprostatectomy with Orthotopic Neobladder Reconstruction Surgery was performed by Dr M A Zulkifl at United Hospital Limited on a 60-year-old patient. Dr Ashim Kumar Sen Gupta successfully conducted the first chronomodulated chemotherapy on an elder patient with advanced colon cancer. United Hospital Limited successfully carried out its first transcatheter aortic valve replacement on 25 July 2017. In 2026, the hospital name was back to its previous name as Continental Hospital PLC.
