= NSFT =

NSFT may refer to:

- Norfolk and Suffolk NHS Foundation Trust, a large mental health trust and an NHS Foundation Trust
- NSFT, the Delhi Metro station code for Noida Sector 15 metro station, Uttar Pradesh, India
