= Hamidia Hospital =

Coordinates: 23.260148°N 77.393579°E

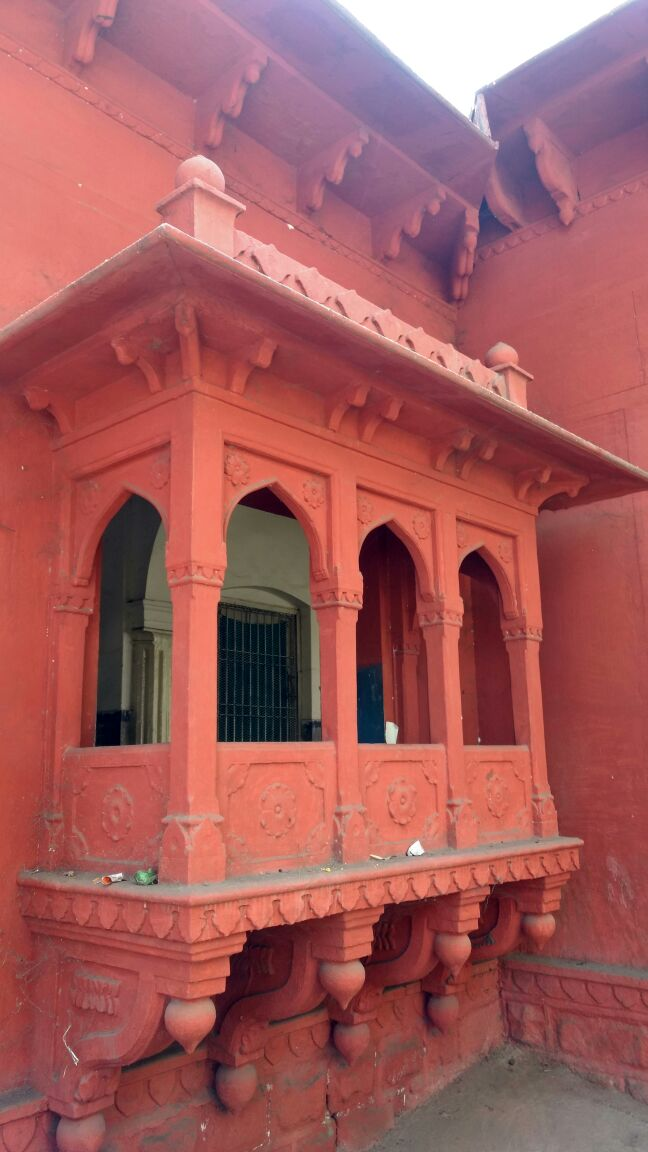
- Architecture of Hamidia Hospital at Fatehgarh, Bhopal

Geography
- Location: Royal Market, Fatehgarh, Bhopal, Madhya Pradesh, India

Organisation
- Care system: Public
- Type: Teaching tertiary care general hospital
- Affiliated university: Gandhi Medical College, Bhopal

Services
- Emergency department: yes
- Beds: 2000

Links
- Lists: Hospitals in India

Hamidia Hospital is a multispeciality tertiary care teaching hospital in Bhopal, Madhya Pradesh, India. It was earlier known as Prince of Wales King Edwards Memorial Hospital for Men. It is affiliated to Gandhi Medical College, Bhopal, in the capital of Madhya Pradesh.

== History ==
Before 1927, it was a small hospital with 25 beds in a building which now houses the city Kotwali. During the next 22 years the bed strength of this hospital was gradually increased. It was shifted to its present venue in the same period. In 1949, before the merger of the Bhopal State, the Hamidia Hospital had 175 beds. The year 1953 saw further extension in the Hamidia Hospital, when the present building inside the Fort Fatehgath was occupied. In 1956 a new three-storeyed surgical wing with two modern operation theatres and a new three-storeyed Medical Ward were added. Since the construction of these new hospitals the bed count was raised to 525.

Hamidia Hospital played a crucial role in emergency response and care after the Bhopal disaster.

== Expansion plans ==
The latest expansion plan for Hamidia aims to create a state-of-the-art multi-speciality "Smart Medi-City" with 2000 beds, a medical college with the intake of 250, and residential quarters for the staff. Designed as a LEED Platinum Green rated complex, Hamidia overlooks the magnificent Grand Lake and has been designed around several notable historical and religious buildings within this precinct, all of which are integral to the urban fabric of the area.
