= Panchanan Maheshwari =

Indian Botanist (9 November 1904 – 18 May 1966)

Dr. Panchanan Maheswari
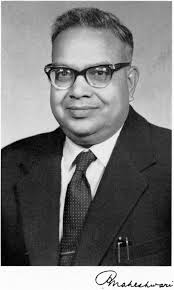
- Born: 9 November 1904; Jaipur, Kingdom of Amber
- Died: 18 May 1966 (aged 61)
- Citizenship: Indian
- Education: Ewing Christian College
- Known for: Invention of the technique of test-tube fertilization of angiosperms
- Awards: FRS (1965)
- Scientific career
- Fields: Botany

Panchanan Maheswari, FRS (9 November 1904 – 18 May 1966 in Jaipur, Rajasthan) was a prominent Indian botanist noted chiefly for his invention of the technique of test-tube fertilization of angiosperms. This invention has allowed the creation of new hybrid plants that could not previously be crossbred naturally. He also emphasised the need for initiation of work on the artificial culture of immature embryos. He is also known as the father of Indian plant embryology also wrote a book - An Introduction to Embryology of Angiosperms.

He encouraged general education and made a significant contribution to school education by his leadership in bringing out the very first textbooks of Biology for Higher Secondary Schools published by NCERT in 1964.

== Education ==
Maheshwari was born at Jaipur and educated at Ewing Christian College in Allahabad, intending to pursue a career in medicine. At Ewing, Maheshwari came under the mentorship of Winfield Dudgeon, and changed his studies from medicine to science. He received is Bachelor of Science (1925), Master of Science (1931), and Doctor of Science (1931) degrees, all under Dudgeon's influence. Maheshwari was an atheist.

== Career ==
In addition to his research achievements, Maheshwari was an educator and publisher. He taught Botany at the University of Delhi, establishing that department as a globally important center of research in embryology and tissue culture.

Maheshwari founded the scientific journal Phytomorphology (Plant Morphology), for which he served as chief editor until his death in 1966; and the more popular magazine Botanica. He also published texts to improve the standard of teaching life sciences in the schools.

In 1951, he founded the International Society of Plant Morphologists.

He was a founding charter member of the World Academy of Art and Science, an international non-governmental organization founded in 1960 to address the major concerns of humanity.

== Awards and honours ==
Panchanan Maheshwari was a scientific citizen of the world and many academies felt honoured to make him a Foundation Fellow. In 1934 he became a fellow of the Indian Academy of Sciences, Bangalore. The Indian Botanical Society honoured him with the Birbal Sahni Medal in 1958. He was the General President-elect of the Indian Science Congress Association for 1968, a role he could not fulfil on account of his untimely death on 18 May 1966. It was typical of him that he did not disclose this even to his family members, who learned it later only through newspapers. Many of his well wishers and students honoured him by naming their new findings after him, such as Panchanania jaipurensis (fungus) and Isoetes panchananii. Maheshwari was elected a Fellow of the Royal Society (FRS) in 1965, he was second Indian Botanist to receive this accolade.
