= Noida Sector 16 metro station =

Metro station in Delhi, India

Noida Sector 16

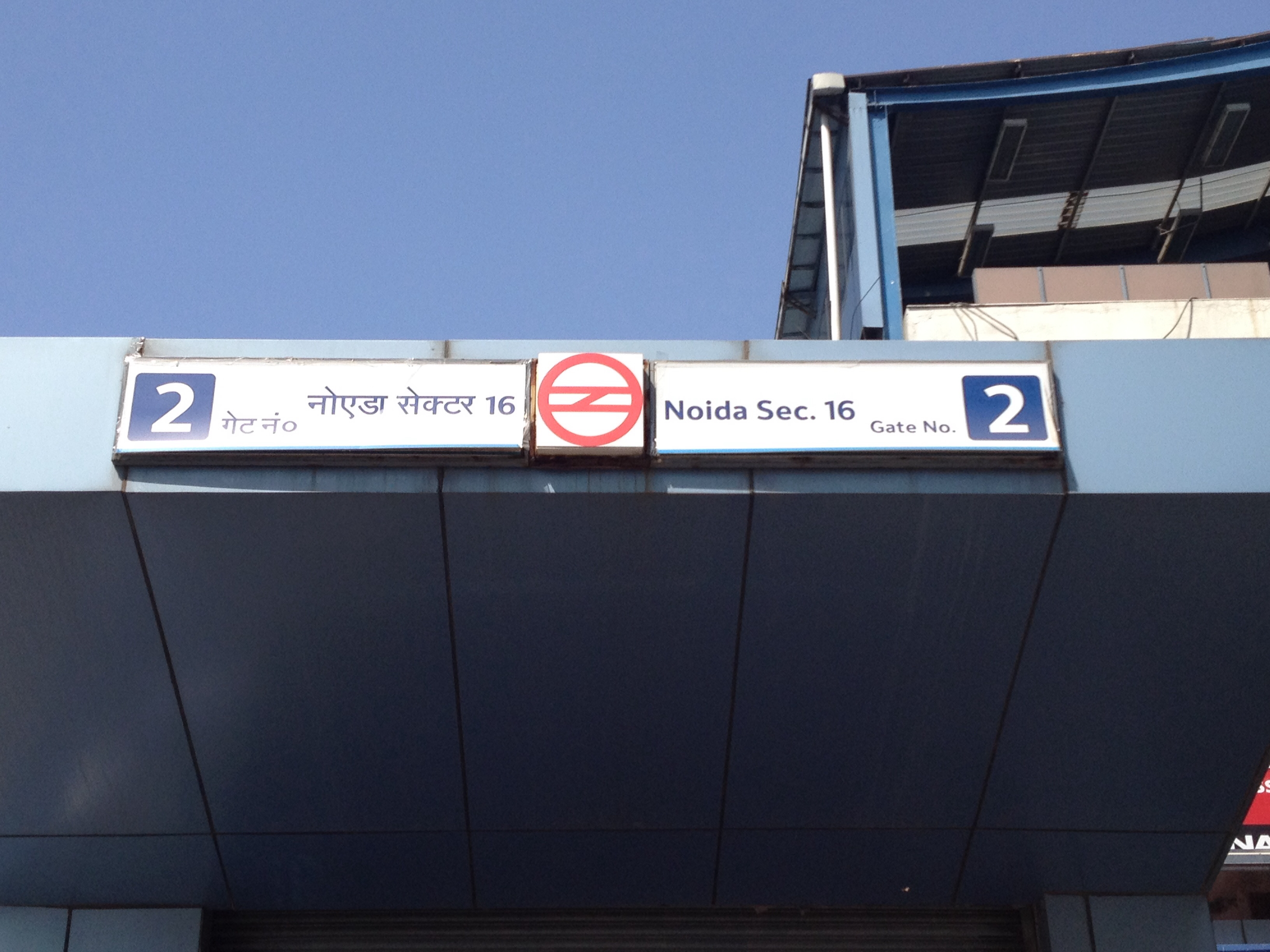
- Noida Sector 16 metro station in May 2022

General information
- Location: Captain Vijayant Thapar Marg, Sector 16, Noida, Uttar Pradesh 201301
- Coordinates: 28°34′42″N 77°19′03″E
- System: Delhi Metro station
- Owner: Delhi Metro Rail Corporation Ltd. (DMRC)
- Line: Blue Line
- Platforms: Side platform; Platform-1 → Noida Electronic City; Platform-2 → Dwarka Sector 21
- Tracks: 2

Construction
- Structure type: Elevated
- Platform levels: 2
- Accessible: Yes

Other information
- Station code: NSST

History
- Opened: 12 November 2009; 16 years ago
- Electrified: 25 kV 50 Hz AC through overhead catenary

Passengers
- 2015: Average 15,879 /day 492,264 (Month of Jan)

Services
Preceding station	Delhi Metro	Following station
Noida Sector 15 towards Dwarka Sector 21	Blue Line	Noida Sector 18 towards Noida Electronic City
Route map
Location

The Noida Sector 16 is a metro station on the Blue Line of the Delhi Metro railway, in the city of Noida in Uttar Pradesh, India.

== Station layout ==
L2	Side platform | Doors will open on the left
L2	Platform 1 South East bound	Towards → Noida Electronic City; Next Station: Noida Sector 18
L2	Platform 2 Westbound	Towards ← Dwarka Sector 21; Next Station: Noida Sector 15
L2	Side platform | Doors will open on the left
L1	Concourse	Fare control, station agent, Metro Card vending machines, crossover
G	Street Level	Exit/Entrance

== Facilities ==
ATMs and parking.

== Nearby ==
- Domino's Pizza
- Punjab National Bank
- Indian Post

== See also ==
- List of Delhi Metro stations
- Transport in Delhi
- Delhi Metro Rail Corporation
- Delhi Suburban Railway
- List of rapid transit systems in India
