= Mall of India =

DLF Mall of India
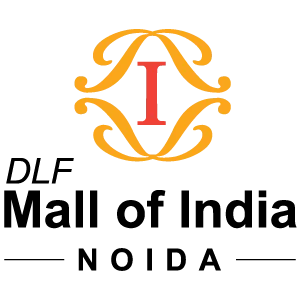

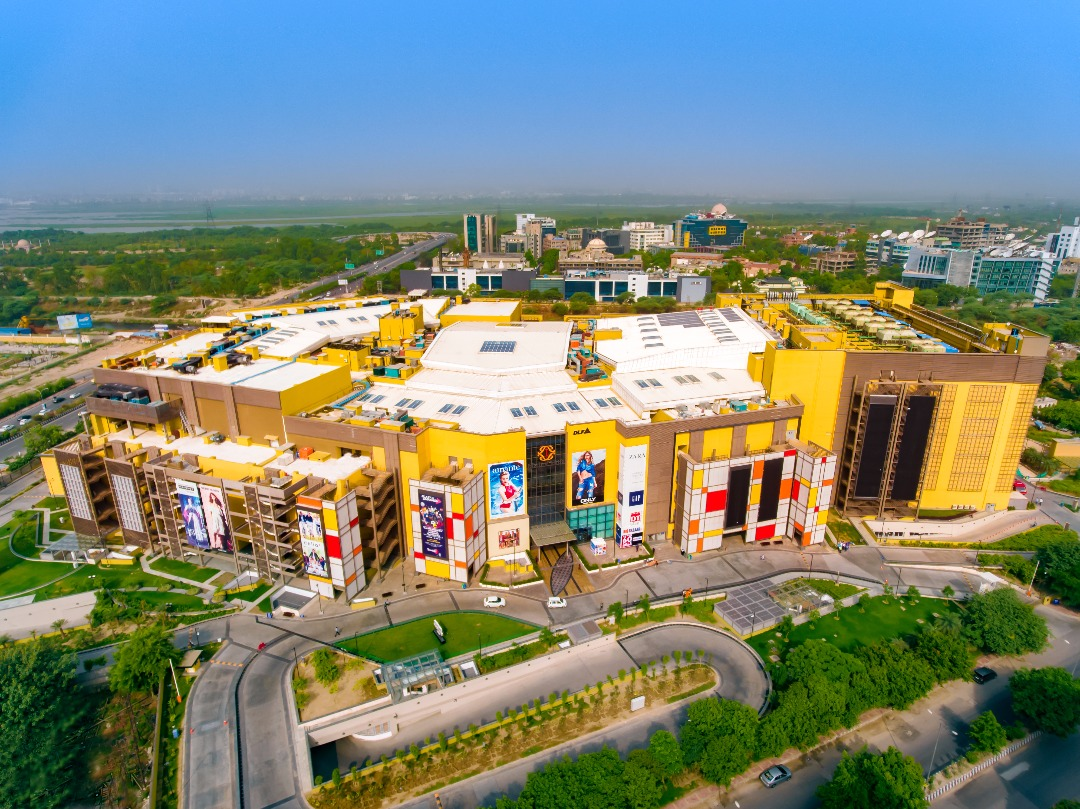
- Aerial view of the DLF Mall of India
- Location: Sector-18, Noida, Uttar Pradesh, India
- Opened: February 2016
- Developer: DLF Limited
- Owner: DLF Limited
- Num. of stores: 333
- Num. of anchor tenants: 18
- Floor area: 2 million sq.ft. (14.75 acres)
- Floors: 7
- Parking: Valet parking
- Public transit: Noida Sector 18: Blue Line
- Website: www.dlfmallofindia.com

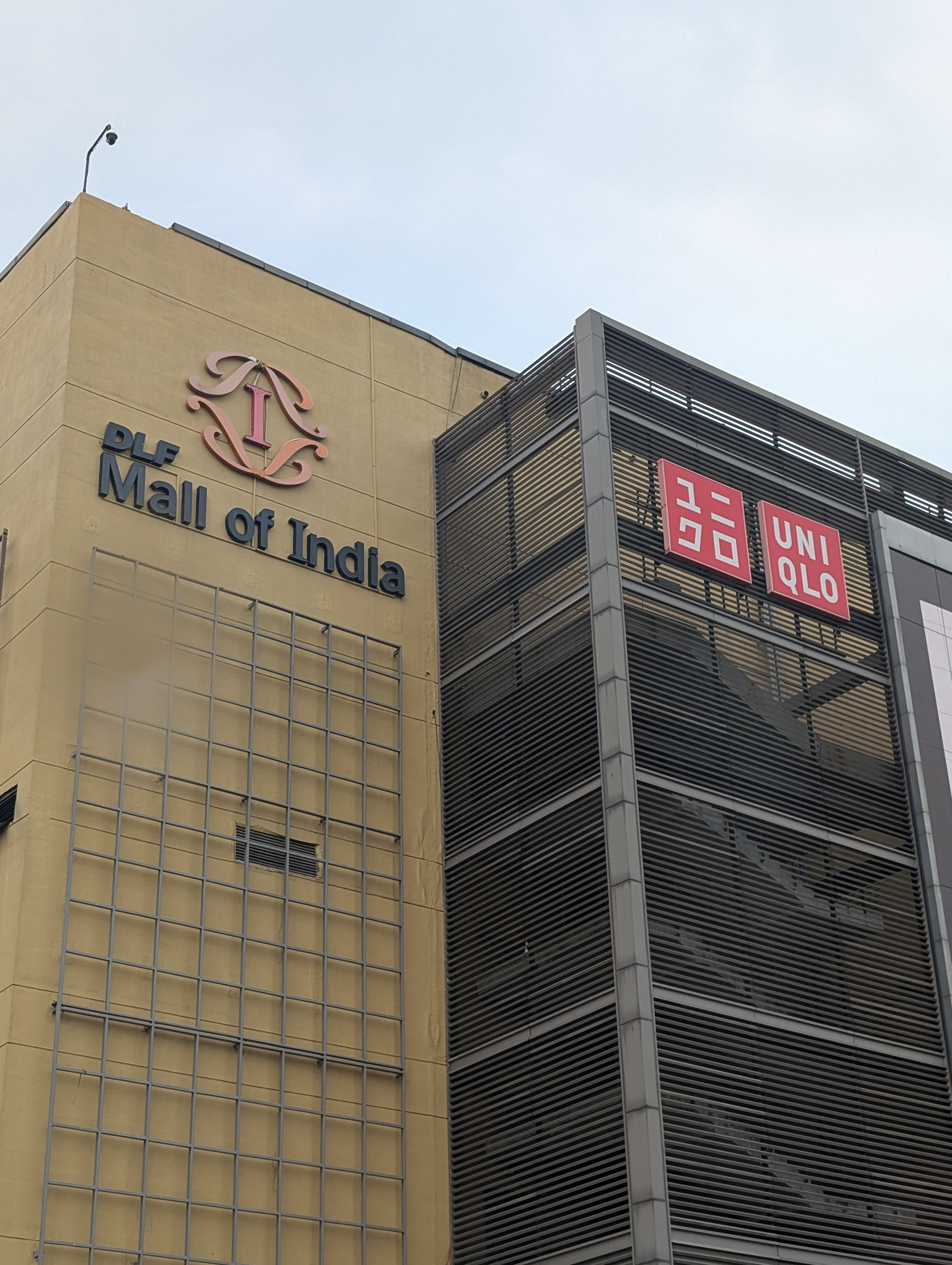
DLF Mall of India, Noida from outside

The DLF Mall of India is a shopping mall situated in Sector 18, Noida, Uttar Pradesh, India within Delhi NCR. The mall is spread over 7 floors, and includes 330 brands, 80 kiosks, 5 customized shopping zones, along with 75 food and beverages options and a movie theatre (PVR Cinemas) with 7 screens. Developed by DLF Limited, the mall was expected to be operational by December 2014, but it eventually opened for public in February 2016.

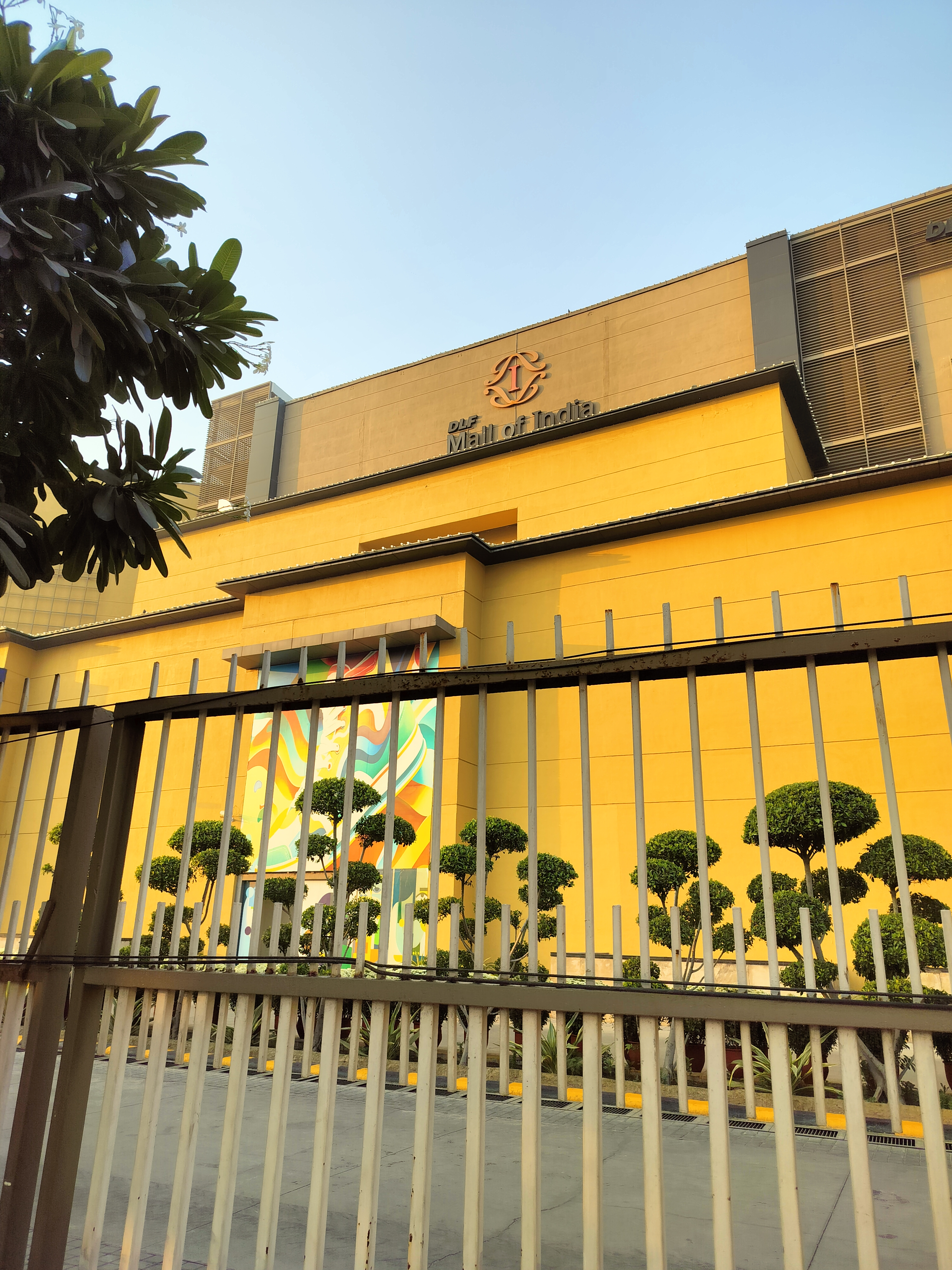
DLF Mall of India, Noida

Mall of India was planned and designed by the British architectural firm Benoy, with six customized shopping levels including international and Indian fashion, dedicated kids zone, entertainment, international cafes, food court and restaurants with a race track atrium. It is a popular hub for shopping, entertainment and dining.

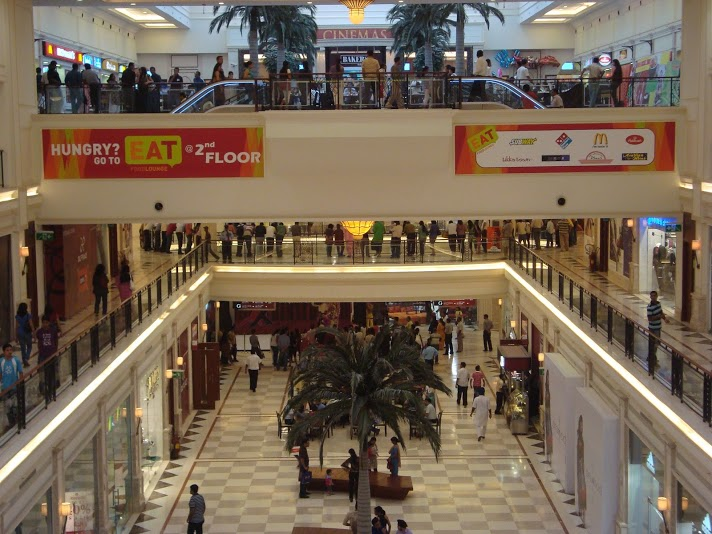
Inside view

To add to the Mall of India franchise, DLF is constructing a second Mall of India in Cyber City of Gurgaon, which would have a capacity space in excess of 500,000 sq ft (46,500 m^{2}) than their mall in Noida. However, in November 2008, construction work at the mall, after initial land lease and digging, was put on hold due to overall fall in retail rentals. After its opening Delhi NCR will have two DLF Mall of India. Thus, its current status is held in a stalled state.
