= Ravindra Khattree =

Indian-American statistician and academic

- Born: 1959 (age 66–67); Uttar Pradesh, India
- Education: Indian Statistical Institute, University of Pittsburgh
- Occupation: Statistics professor
- Known for: Fountain–Khattree–Peddada Theorem, Khattree-Naik Plots, Khattree's nonnegative estimators of variances, Khattree-Bahuguna Skewness

Ravindra Khattree (born 1959) is an Indian-American statistician and a distinguished professor of statistics at Oakland University and a co-director of the Center for Data Science and Big Data Analytics/ Institute for Data Science at the same university.

== Early life ==
Khattree was born in Uttar Pradesh, India. He attended the Ewing Christian College-Allahabad University and the Indian Statistical Institute. In 1985, he earned a doctorate from the University of Pittsburgh with Calyampudi Radhakrishna Rao as his advisor.

== Career ==
Kahttree started his professional career as a faculty member at North Dakota State University. Later, he was a faculty member at Case Western Reserve University and also worked at BFGoodrich Chemical Group.

He became a faculty member at Oakland University in 1991. He was the biostatistics group leader in the Biomedical Research and Informatics Center and a professor of biostatistics in the College of Human Medicine, Michigan State University during 2005–2006. He worked as a senior research scientist at US National Academy of Sciences with assignment at the Radiation Effects Research Foundation (formerly known as Atomic Bomb Casualty Commission), Hiroshima during 2010–2011.

His contribution to the Fountain–Khattree–Peddada Theorem in Pitman measure of closeness is one of the important results of his work. Khattree is the coauthor of two books and has coedited two volumes. He has served as an associate editor of the Communications in Statistics journal and the editor of the Interstat online journal. He was Chief editor of Journal of Statistics and Applications for more than ten years. He is an elected fellow of the American Statistical Association.

== Recognition ==
In 2002, Khattree received the Young Researcher Award from the International Indian Statistical Association. Khattree was honored with fellowship in the American Statistical Association in 2003 and became an elected member of the International Statistical Institute in 2004. He is also a recipient of Oakland University Research Excellence Award (2008).

== Bibliography ==
- Applied Multivariate Statistics with SAS Software (1995, 1999) with Dayanand N. Naik
- Multivariate Data Reduction and Discrimination with SAS Software (2000) with Dayanand N. Naik
- Handbook of Statistics Volume 22, Statistics in Industry (2002) with C.R. Rao
- Computational Methods in Biomedical Research (2008) with Dayanand N. Naik
- Handbook of Statistics Volume 53, Statistics in Industry and Government (2025) with H So and Arni Rao
