= Gautam Buddha University School of Biotechnology =

Professional school in Uttar Pradesh, India

- Other name: GBU-SOB
- Established: 2009
- Parent institution: Gautam Buddha University
- Location: Greater Noida, Uttar Pradesh, India; 28.41°N 77.52°E
- Website: www.gbu.ac.in

The Gautam Buddha University School of Biotechnology (GBUSOB) is a professional school of the Gautam Buddha University in Greater Noida, an industrial and educational hub in the northern Indian state of Uttar Pradesh.

GBUSOB offers residential under graduate, post-graduate degree programs in Biotechnology that combine teaching with research and awards the Master of Technology (MTech) and PhD degrees.

== Background ==
The School of Biotechnology of the Gautam Buddha University commenced academic sessions in August 2009.

The school is organized in 5 departments: Department of Genetic Engineering, Department of Bioinformatics, Department of Plant Biotechnology, Department of Animal Biotechnology and the Department of Industrial Microbiology.

== Programs ==
=== Master of Technology ===
GBUSOB offers a five-year program for btech+mtech/mba for undergraduates, three-year (six semester) program for science graduates and two-year program for B.Tech/M.Sc. students that awards the Master of Technology in biotechnology. The areas of specialization available include genetic engineering, bioinformatics, and food technology.

== Doctoral research programs (PhD) ==
Areas for research: animal biotechnology, plant biotechnology, bioinformatics, cell and molecular biology, structure biology and biochemistry

== Student profile ==
=== Admissions ===
GBUSOB admits students based on the Graduate Proficiency Test. Applicants are required to have completed all requirement for at least a 3-year undergraduate degree in Sciences or Applied Sciences before the start of the academic session.

As a public university, GBUSOB follows the Government of India norms and reserves 23% of the incoming class seats for Scheduled Castes and 27% for Other Backward Classes.

=== Community ===
All students reside in campus, in university housing.
