= Rana P Singh =

Indian scientist and professor of cancer biology

Rana P. Singh
- Prof Rana Pratap Singh
- Education: Jawaharlal Nehru University; Ewing Christian College
- Known for: Cancer Research
- Spouse: Aruna Singh
- Children: Ayushi
- Scientific career
- Workplaces: Jawaharlal Nehru University; Colorado University; University of California, Riverside; Johns Hopkins University; Central University of Gujarat; Gautam Buddha University
- Doctoral advisor: Prof A. Ramesha Rao
- Website: rpscancerlab.com

Prof. Rana P Singh is an Indian cancer scientist and Professor at the School of Life Sciences, Jawaharlal Nehru University (JNU), New Delhi, India. He is the Vice Chancellor of Gautam Buddha University, Greater Noida serving from February 2025 onwards.

Singh is an academic administrator who has established new departments, schools, and research centres in India.

His research includes stem cell biology, spheroids/organoids, DNA repair mechanisms, and the effects of microgravity on radiobiology. Singh's work examines cell signalling and the interactions that govern cellular behaviour and cancer progression, he contributes to the understanding of cancer and its treatment. He has published over 194 research papers in scientific journals such as Nature, Oxford Academic, Harvard Catalyst, and the American Association for Cancer Research Journal.

== Early life and education ==
Singh completed his Ph.D. in life sciences with a specialization in cancer biology from Jawaharlal Nehru University, New Delhi, India, in 2000. Prior to this, he earned his M.Sc. in life sciences from Jawaharlal Nehru University. He obtained his B.Sc. in zoology, botany, and chemistry from Ewing Christian College, University of Allahabad, Uttar Pradesh, India.

He worked at the University of Colorado as a research scholar and later as an assistant professor.

== Administrative positions ==
Singh founded the Special Centre for Systems Medicine at Jawaharlal Nehru University (JNU) and has been chairperson of the centre since 2021. This centre integrates scientific disciplines to improve healthcare, merging systems biology, computational biology, high-throughput data analysis, metabolomics, transcriptomics, regulomics, phenomics, and pharmacogenomics, along with biobanking, data analytics, and animal studies to develop diagnostic and prognostic technologies. Singh's establishment of this centre aligns with promoting interdisciplinary approaches within medical science at JNU as per National Education Policy 2020.

He established the School of Life Sciences and its research facilities as its founding dean at the Central University of Gujarat from 2010 to 2012.

Singh served as rector (pro-vice chancellor) of JNU from May 2017 to 2022 and has been the president of the Institutional Innovation Council at JNU since 2019. His contributions to the university also include serving as Dean of Students, court member, and executive council member. Prior to his tenure at JNU, he held positions at the Central University of Gujarat, including dean of students' welfare, Dean of the School of Life Sciences, Dean of the School of Environmental Sciences, Provost, and chairman of the admission committee.

== Academic career ==
Singh's academic career in cancer biology has included positions at multiple institutions. Since 2012, he has been a professor of cancer biology at the School of Life Sciences, Jawaharlal Nehru University (JNU), New Delhi, India. From 2012 to 2016, he was an adjunct professor at the School of Life Sciences, Central University of Gujarat, Gandhinagar, where he previously served as a professor from 2010 to 2012. His earlier appointments include associate professor of molecular cancer biology at JNU from 2006 to 2010 and assistant professor-research at the Department of Pharmaceutical Sciences, School of Pharmacy, University of Colorado Denver, from 2003 to 2006. He also worked as a research associate at the same department from 2001 to 2003, following a post-doctoral Research Fellowship at the Center for Cancer Causation and Prevention, AMC Cancer Research Center, Lakewood, Colorado, from 2000 to 2001. In 2014, he was a visiting scientist at the University of California, Riverside.

== Awards and honours ==
- Indo-US Science and Technology Forum (IUSSTF) Award (2019): Awarded for establishing the "Centre for Integrative Cancer Biology and Therapeutics," a Virtual Networked Centre in collaboration with Jawaharlal Nehru University (JNU) and Stanford University/Oregon Health & Science University (OHSU), Portland, US.
- ICMR International Fellowship for Young Biomedical Scientists (2013–14): Awarded by the Indian Council of Medical Research (ICMR) for research conducted at the University of California, Riverside in 2014.
- Post-doctoral Trainee Award for Prostate Cancer Research (2003): Conferred by the U.S. Army Medical Research and Materiel Command, Department of Defense, received for contributions in prostate cancer research.
- Scholar-in-Training Award (2002): Presented by the American Association for Cancer Research, Philadelphia, PA, received for cancer research early in his career.

== Research publications ==
Singh's research has received over 16,530 citations and has an h-index of 78 and i10-index of 157.

According to Google Scholar, since 2020, he has achieved more than 5,346 citations. His work includes more than 200 research articles published in journals, including Nature, Springer, Elsevier, Wiley and those of the American Association for Cancer Research (AACR). Singh's research spans cancer biology, stem cell research, and other fields in life sciences.

His lab has researched the effects of microgravity on human cells.

=== Books, chapters and articles ===
Singh has written book chapters on cancer biology and a complete book Breast Cancer: Biology, Prevention and Treatment. Some of his writings are:

- Mechanisms of Resistance in Head and Neck Cancers. N.p.: Frontiers Media SA, 2022.
- Cancer Research. United States: Waverly Press, 2009.
- Simulated microgravity induces DNA damage concurrent with impairment of DNA repair and activation of cell-type specific DNA damage response in microglial and glioblastoma cells
- Simulated microgravity triggers DNA damage and mitochondria-mediated apoptosis through ROS generation in human promyelocytic leukemic cells.
