= Gandhi Medical College, Bhopal =

Medical college in Madhya Pradesh, India

Coordinates: 23.2602°N 77.3906°E

- Motto: असतो मा सद्गमय
- Motto in English: Lead us from Untruth to Truth
- Type: Autonomous body (since 1997) controlled by Gandhi Medical College Society, Department of Medical Education, Government of Madhya Pradesh
- Established: 1955; 71 years ago
- Affiliations: Madhya Pradesh Medical Science University
- Dean: Dr. Kavita N. Singh
- Students: 250 per year (undergraduate)
- Location: Bhopal, Madhya Pradesh, India
- Website: gmcbhopal.net

Gandhi Medical College (Hindi: गाँधी चिकित्सा महाविद्यालय, भोपाल, GMC) is a public medical school in Bhopal, Madhya Pradesh, India. It was established in 1955.

== Location ==
Gandhi Medical College is located in the Fatehgarh area on Sultania Road in Bhopal, Madhya Pradesh. The college is situated on the ground Fatehgarh Fort once stood.

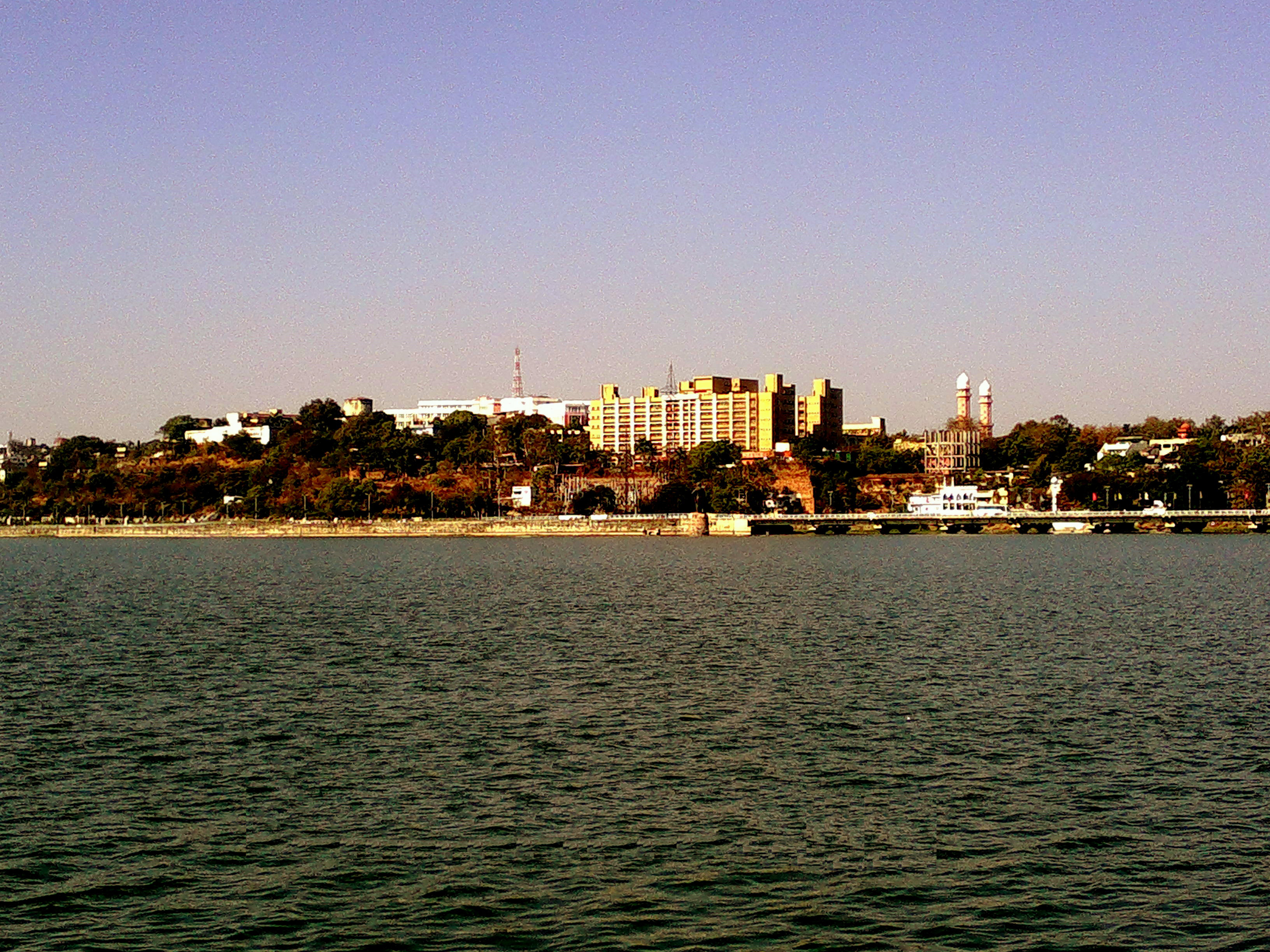
GMC at Upper Lake

== History ==
Gandhi Medical College, Bhopal was inaugurated on 13 August 1955 by Pt. Lal Bahadur Shastri. The college started its functioning in the building of the Polytechnic College with its first batch of 50 students and two departments: Anatomy and Physiology. The first Principal in 1955 was Dr. S.C. Sinha. The boys hostel was in the present Jehanuma Palace Hotel and the girls hostel was bracketed with the MLB college girls hostel at Banganga.

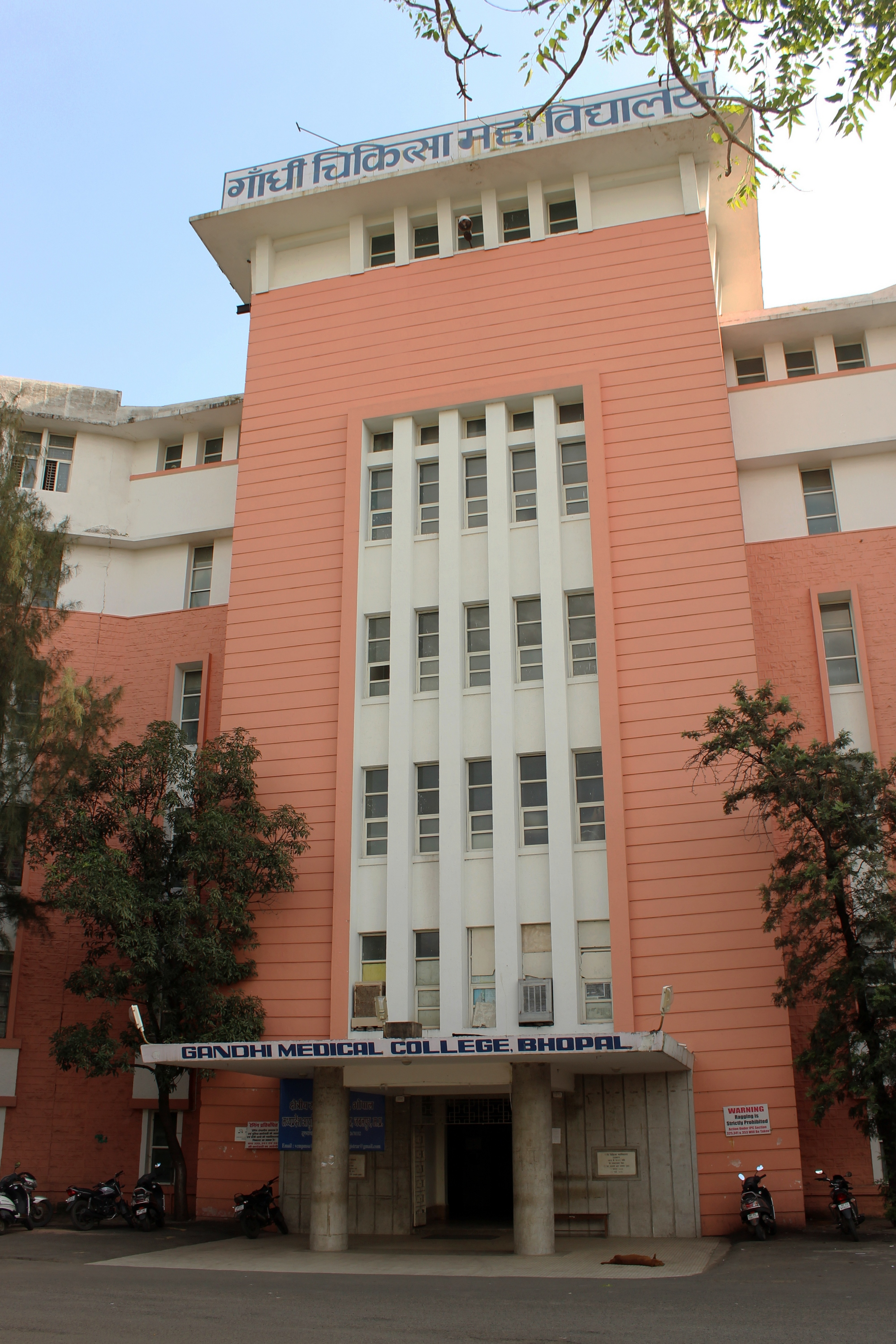
GMC Bhopal

After one year the foundation of an independent building was laid by Union Minister of Home Shri Govind Ballabh Pant on 15 September 1956. It took seven years to complete the construction. This finished building, housed in the historic Fort of Fatehgarh, was inaugurated by the first Prime Minister of India Pt. Jawaharlal Nehru, on 13 March 1963. Also in attendance were Begum Sajida Sultan of Bhopal, Governor Shri H.V. Pataskar, Chief Minister Shri B.R. Mandloi, Health Minister Mr. M.P. Dubey and Principal Dr. R.P. Singh.

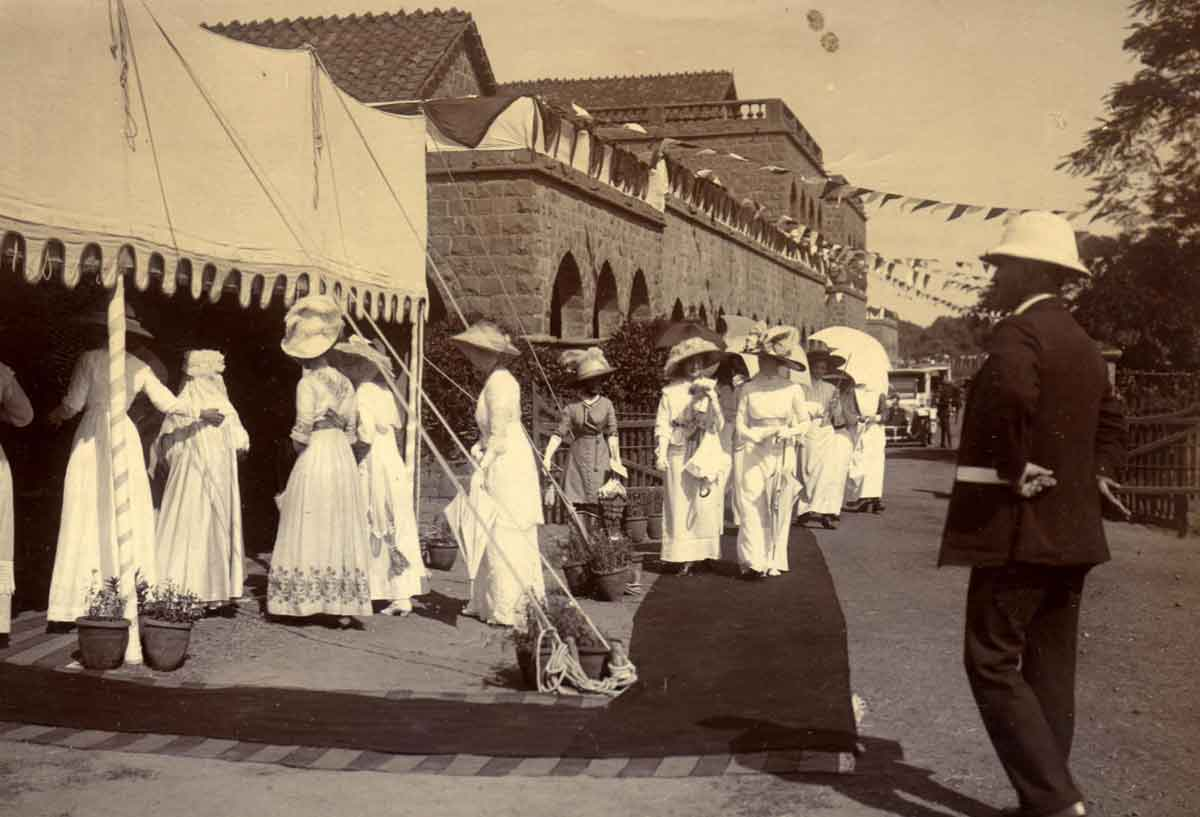
Inauguration of Lady Lansdowne Hospital for women, now known as the Sultania Zanana Hospital

The foundation stone of the surgical and medical wards (Kamla Nehru Block known as KNB wards) was laid by Rajkumari Amrit Kaur the then Union Health Minister on 6 March 1955. The foundation stone of the boys' hostel was laid by King of Nepal Maharaj Mahendra Bir Vikram Shah Deo on 18 November 1955.

Hospitals for men and women were established as Prince of Wales Hospital and Lady Linlithgo Lansdowne Hospital respectively. The hospital changed names with change of reigns. Prince of Wales Hospital became Hamidia Hospital and Lady Linlithgo became Sultania Zanana Hospital. Both remain part of Gandhi Medical College today. Lady Bhore Centre opposite Fire Brigade, Fatehgarh caters to antenatal and child welfare activities in addition to preventive and social medical counseling.

== Campus ==
The campus building is housed in Fort of Fatehgarh which was inaugurated by the first Prime Minister of India Pt. Jawaharlal Nehru. The campus houses:

- Main college building

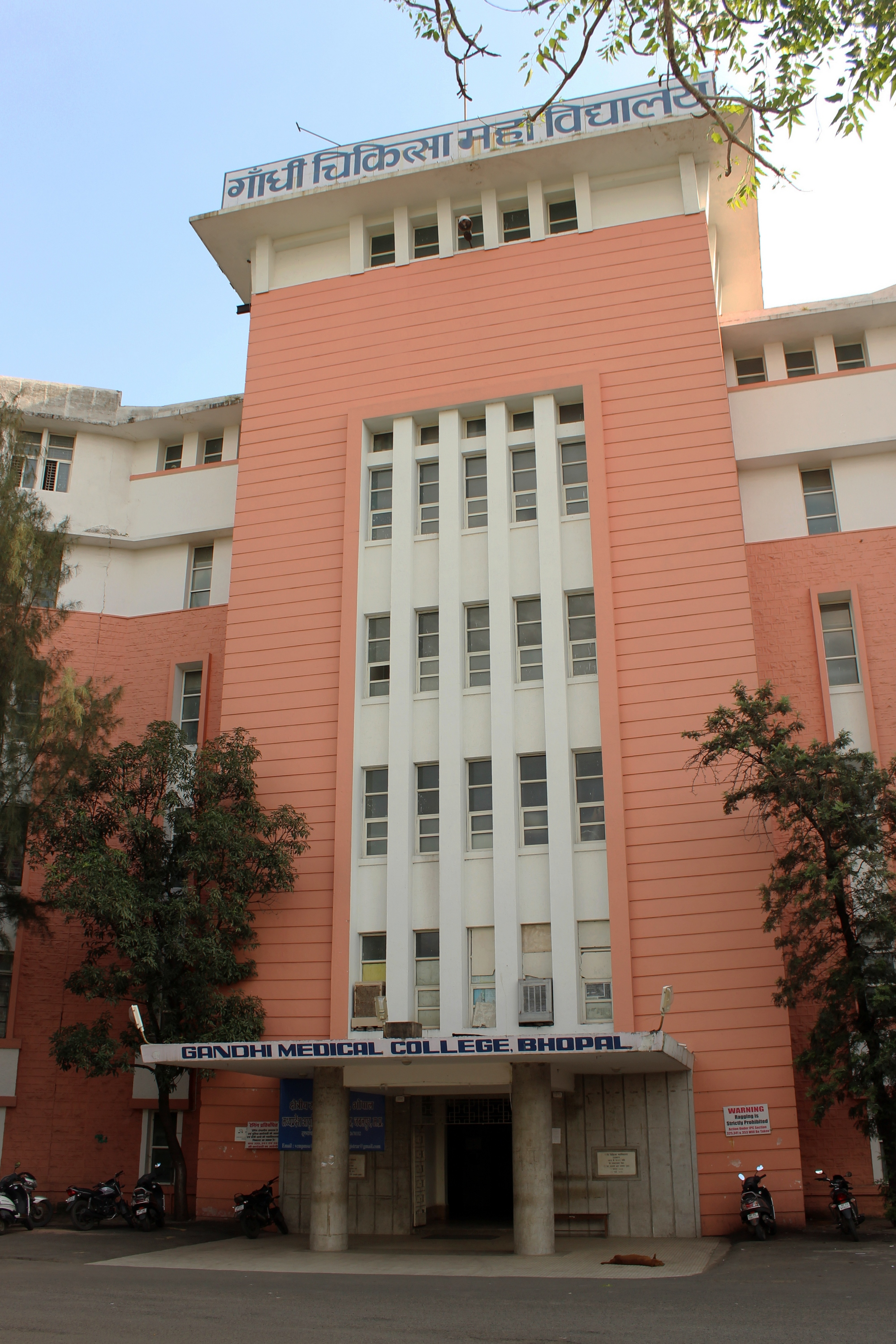
Main Building(Front view)

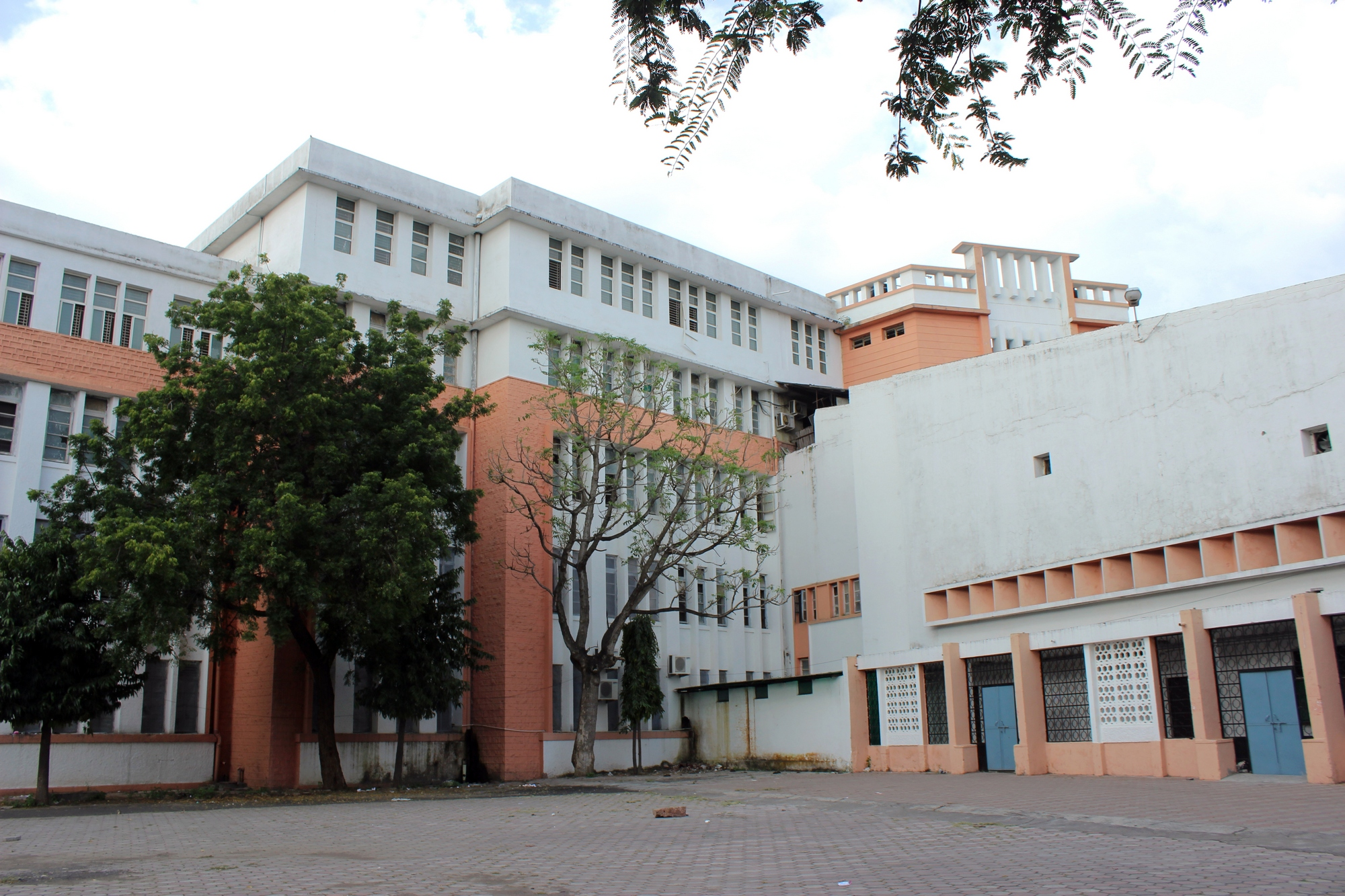
Main Building (South Face)

- Hamidia Hospital
- Kamla Nehru Hospital

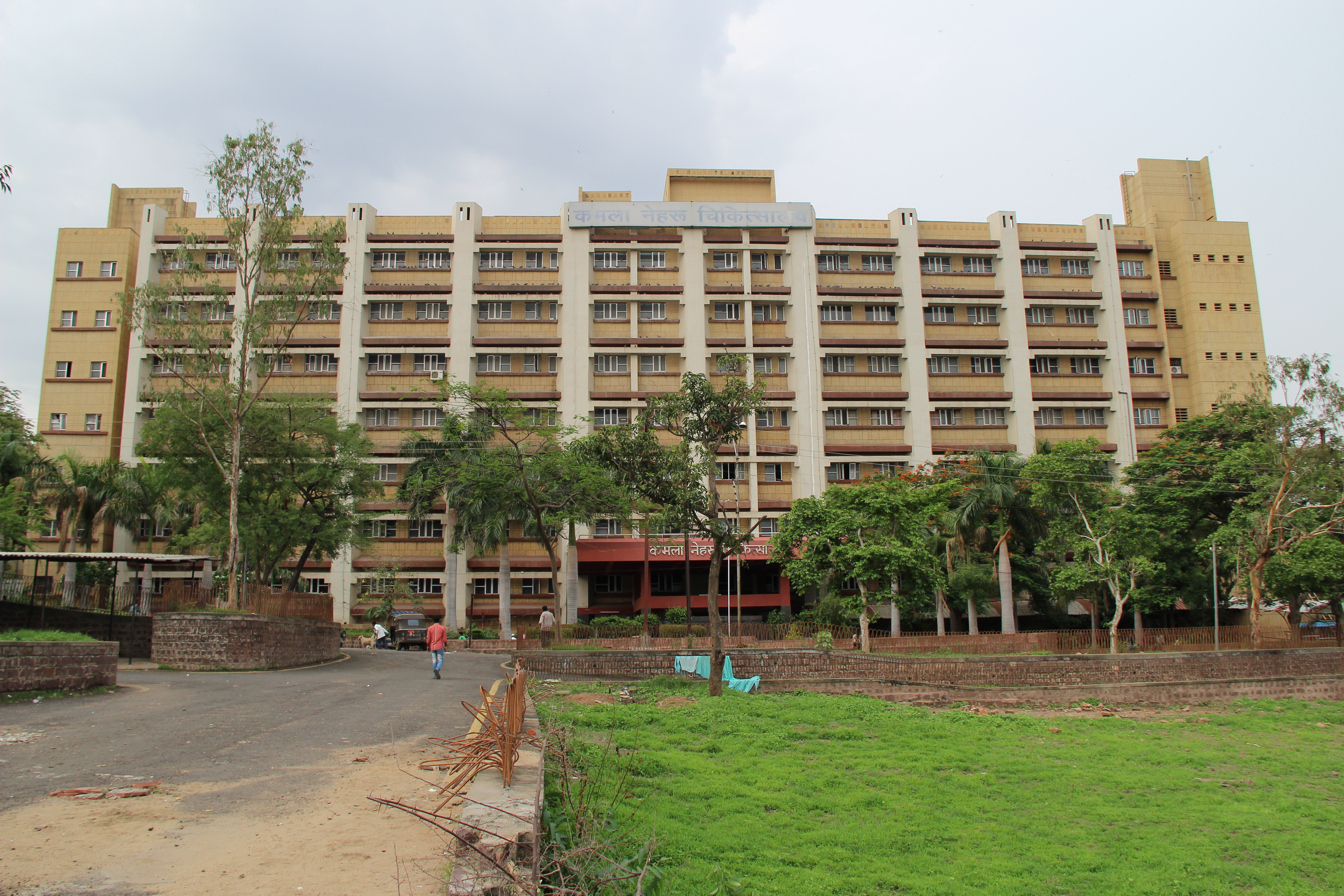
Kamla Nehru Hospital (Main Entrance)

- Regional Institute of Ophthalmology
- NIREH

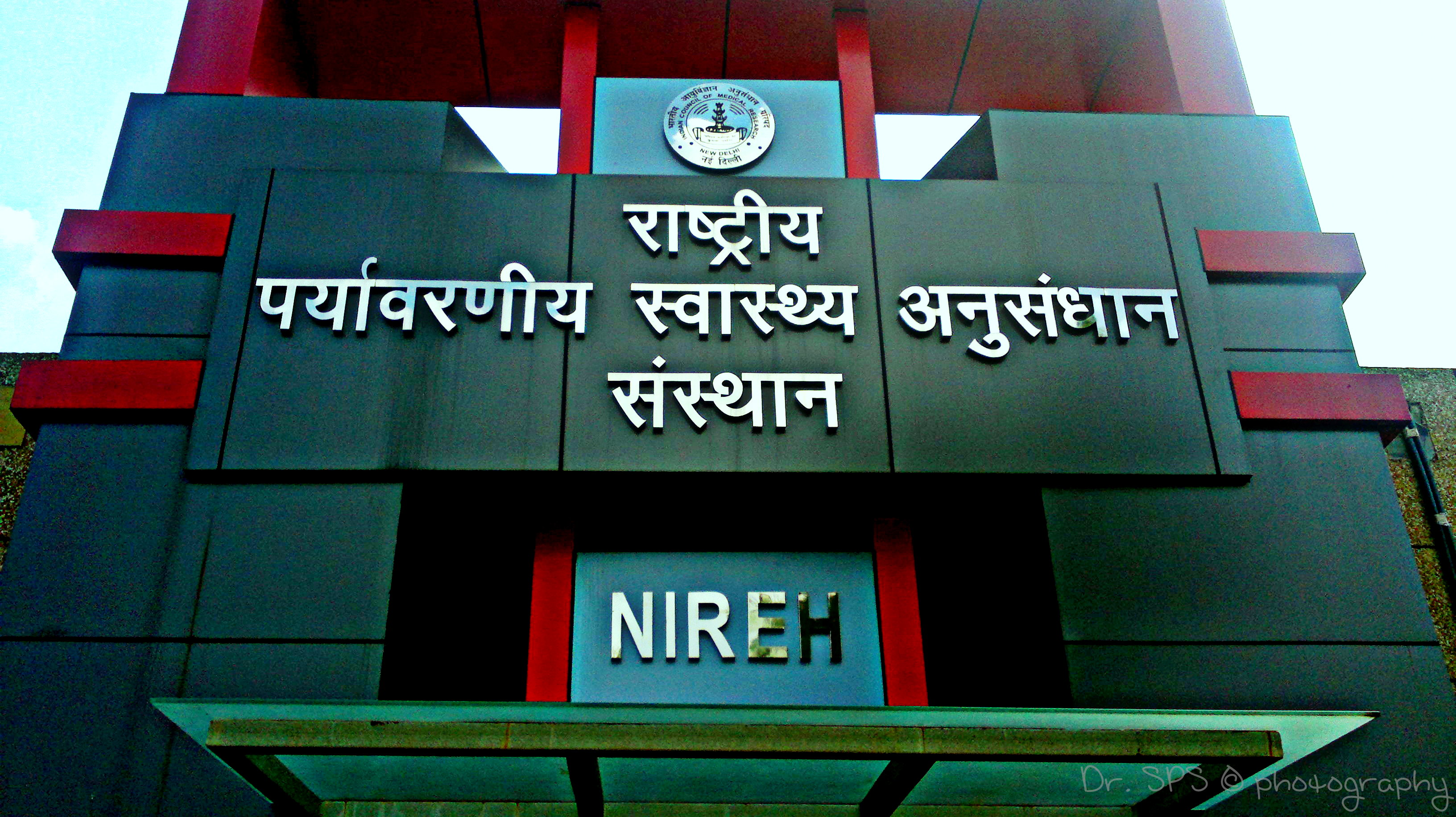

- Central Pathology lab
- Blood Bank
- Rain Basera (for patients and their relatives stay)
- One canteen: JDA Canteen
- Hostels (A-H Blocks)
- Animal House
- Guest House
- Lake view Cricket Ground (under construction)
- Lawn Tennis court
- Badminton court
- Sports complex which houses separate gym for Boys and Girls along with a multi-activity hall and table tennis arena.
- Central Auditorium

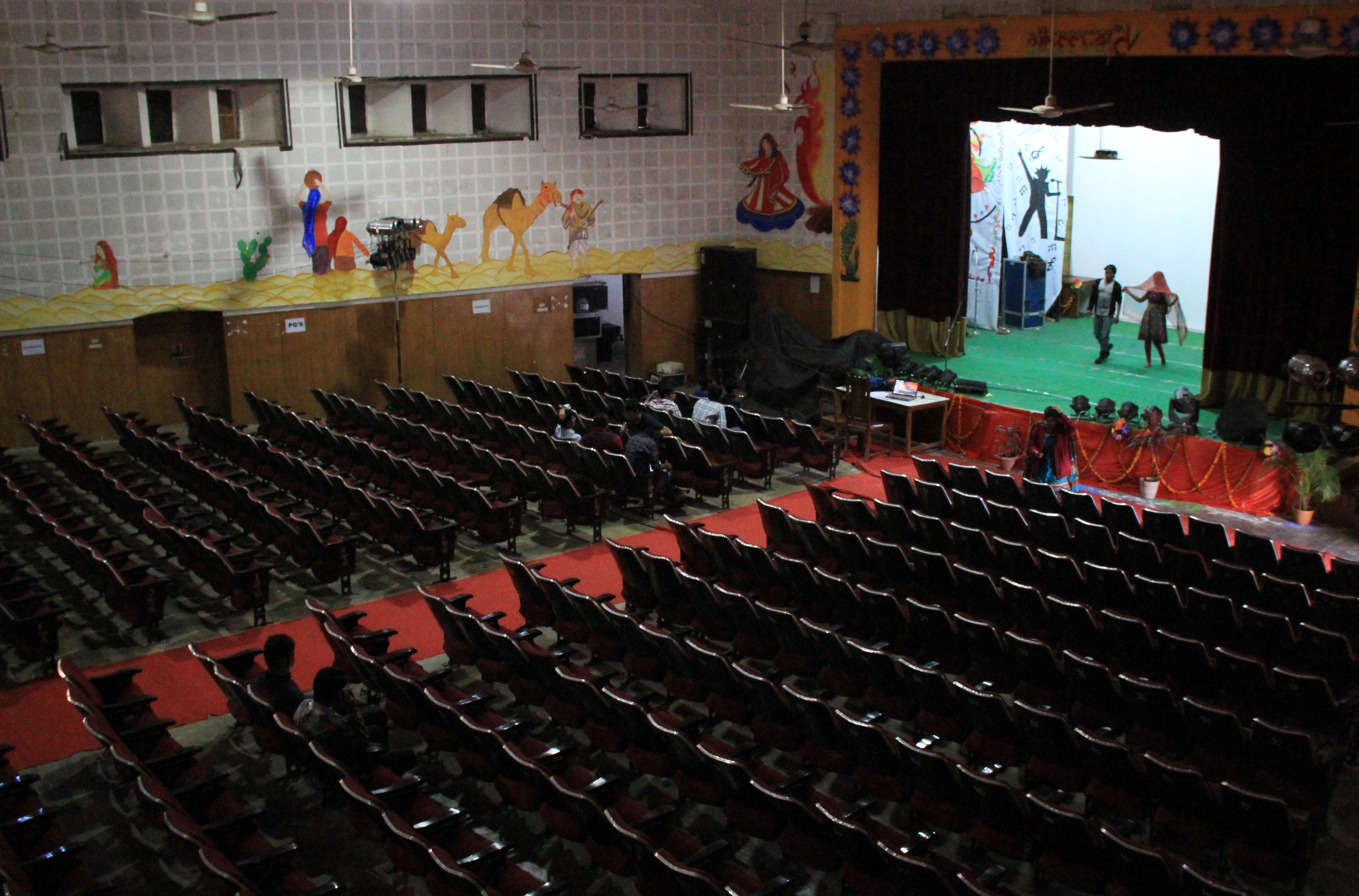
GMC, Bhopal Central Auditorium

- Central library
- Four state of the art lecture theatres (New)
- Four Old Lecture Theatres
- Labs -Biochemistry, Pathology, Anatomy, Microbiology, Physiology, Forensic.

It is recognized by the Medical Council of India & State Paramedical Council of Madhya Pradesh, and affiliated to the Madhya Pradesh Medical Science University located at Jabalpur, Bhopal.

== Departments ==
Departments are distributed between the main college building, Kamla Nehru And Hamidia Hospital

- Anatomy
- Physiology
- Biochemistry
- Pharmacology
- Pathology
- Microbiology
- Forensic Medicine
- Community Medicine
- Ophthalmology
- Otolaryngology (ENT)
- Anesthesiology
- Surgery
- Medicine
- Pediatrics
- Obstetrics & Gynaecology
- Orthopedics
- Radiology
- Gastroenterology
- Skin V D
- TB Chest
- Cardiology
- Pediatric Surgery
- Cardiothoracic Surgery
- Burn & Plastic Surgery
- Psychiatry
- Dentistry
- Oncology

== Hospitals and institutes ==
The following hospitals and institutes are under the medical college:

- Hamidia Hospital
- Sultania Zanana Hospital
- Kamla Nehru Hospital
- Regional Institute of Ophthalmology
- National Institute For Research in Environmental Health
- Cardiac Science Center
- Medico-Legal Institute
- Trauma & emergency Center
- State Virology Laboratory

== Administration ==
Executive committee - Gandhi Medical College Society

- Governing body - Gandhi Medical College Society, Department of Medical Education, Government of Madhya Pradesh.

== Admissions ==
Admission to the MBBS course is through National Eligibility cum Entrance Test-UG (NEET-UG) and direct nominees of Govt. of India.

Admission to post-graduate courses (MS/MD) is through NEET-PG and in-service candidates of Govt. of Madhya Pradesh.

== Medico-Legal Institute ==
The survey committee constituted in 1964 by the government of India considered that essential mission of a Medico-Legal institute should be to train the medical jurists. The Mudalier committee in 1962 recommended the creation of a separate cadre of specially trained medical jurists to look after the work of the state. The government of Madhya Pradesh created the 'First Medico-legal Institute in India' at its capital city Bhopal in 1977.

The Medico-legal Institute played a role in the management of the Bhopal disaster, when a poisonous gas (MIC, methyl isocyanate) leaked from one of the storage tanks of the Union Carbide factory on the night of 2–3 December 1984. Postmortem examinations were conducted and steps were taken to preserve bodily tissues and fluids for the further chemical examination in order to determine what gas/gases have been inhaled by the people.

== National Institute for Research in Environmental Health ==
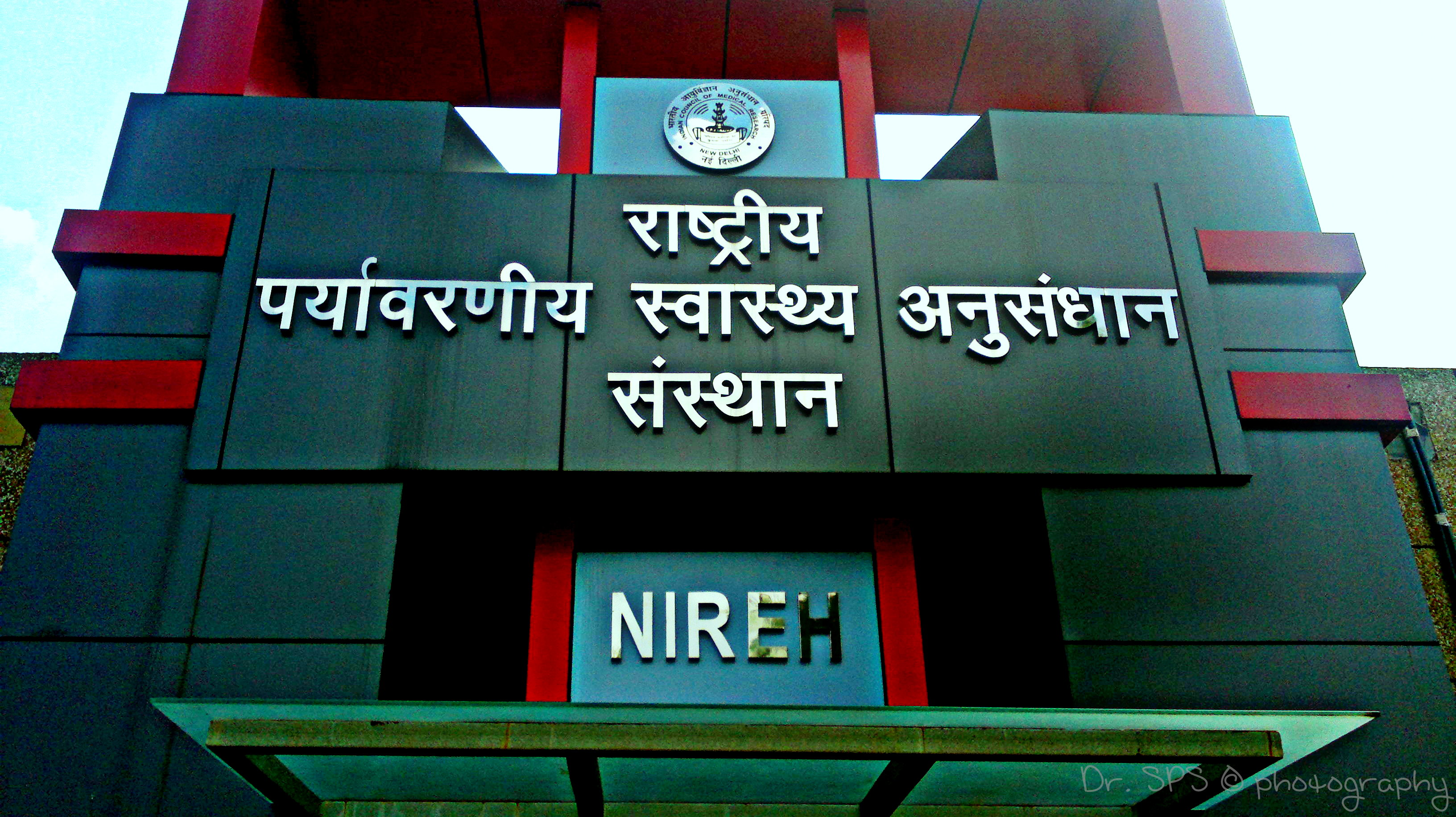
National Institute for Research in Environmental Health

National Institute for Research in Environmental Health (NIREH), Bhopal, is one of the permanent institutes of the Indian Council of Medical Research (ICMR), a government of India's apex autonomous organization for bio-medical research in the country.

Focused research on methyl isocynate (MIC) affected population of Bhopal in the areas of:

- Respiratory disease
- Eye related diseases
- Kidney diseases
- Cancer
- Genetic disorders
- Congenital disorders
- Mental and neurological health
- Women related medical issues
- Second generation children related medical issues
- Rehabilitation

NIREH will have a clinical research wing having the following departments:

- General Medicine
- Respiratory Medicine/Pulmonary Medicine
- Ophthalmology
- Paediatrics
- Obstetrics & Gynecology
- Psychiatry/Mental Health
- Neurology
- Radio diagnosis
- Epidemiology/Community Medicine

The following facilities are in the process of being established at NIREH as part of its development:

- Molecular Biology Laboratory
- Microbiology Laboratory
- Biochemistry Laboratory
- Pathology Laboratory
- Haematology Laboratory
- PFT Laboratory
- Central Equipment Facility
- Department of Epidemiology including biostatistics and computing programming
- Database relating to research on toxic gas exposure and environmental contamination

== Bhopal gas tragedy ==
Gandhi Medical College and Hamidia Hospital played a crucial role in emergency response and care after the Bhopal Disaster.

A regional institute of ophthalmology was established here after the disaster for the patients with eye problems due to MIC.

Studies performed in the institute:

- Health Effects of the Toxic Gas Leak from the Union Carbide Methyl Isocyanate Plant in Bhopal. Technical report on Population Based Long Term, Epidemiological Studies (1985–1994). Bhopal Gas Disaster Research Centre, Gandhi Medical College, Bhopal (2003?) Contains the studies performed by the Indian Council of Medical Research (ICMR)
- An Epidemiological Study of Symptomatic Morbidities in Communities Living Around Solar Evaporation Ponds And Behind Union Carbide Factory, Bhopal. Department of Community Medicine, Gandhi

Medical College, Bhopal "2009"
