= Kamla Nehru Hospital =

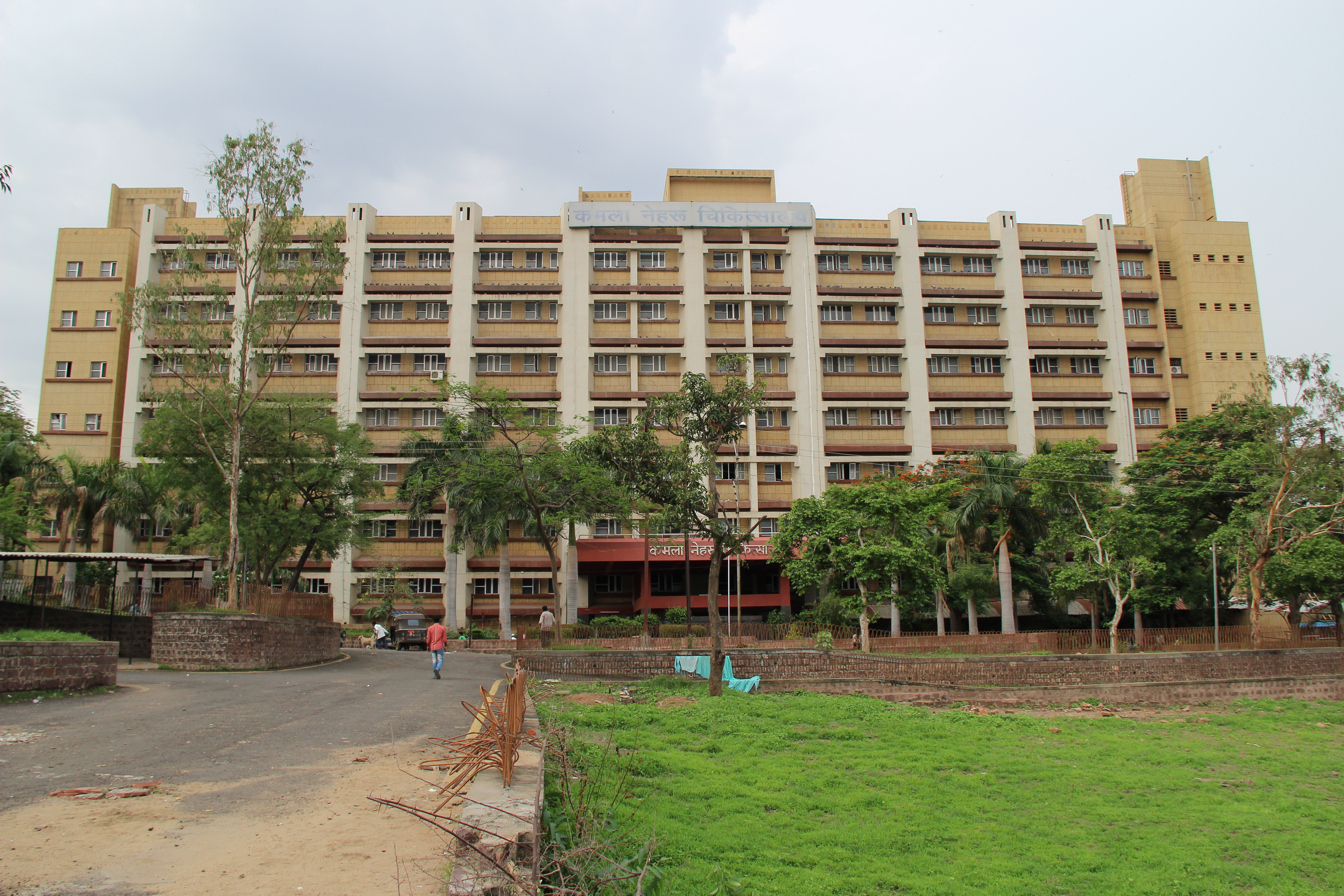

Geography
- Location: Gandhi Medical College campus, Royal Market, Fatehgarh, Bhopal, Madhya Pradesh, India
- Coordinates: 23.258°N 77.392°E

Organisation
- Care system: Public
- Type: Teaching Tertiary Care hospital
- Affiliated university: Gandhi Medical College, Bhopal

Links
- Lists: Hospitals in India

Kamla Nehru Hospital (Hindi: कमला नेहरू चिकित्सालय, KNH) is located in the campus of Gandhi Medical College in Bhopal, the capital of the central Indian state of Madhya Pradesh. The hospital, overlooking Bhopal Upper Lake, houses the Bhopal Gas Tragedy related wards for treatment of victims of the world's worst industrial disaster, the 1984 gas leak in Bhopal from a Union Carbide (India) pesticide factory which killed tens of thousands of people. The Kamla Nehru Hospital also has general medical departments.

== Departments ==
- Radio Diagnosis
- Radiotherapy
- Burns and Plastic Surgery
- Pediatric Surgery
- Pediatric Medicine
- Ophthalmology (temporarily shifted here due to construction of new super specialty block of Hamidia Hospital)
- Central Pathology Lab
