= C P Kukreja Architects =

Indian design company

Practice information
- Key architects: Dikshu Kukreja (Managing Principal)
- Founders: C. P. Kukreja
- Founded: 1969
- No. of employees: 200 +
- Location: New Delhi (India), New York (USA)

Significant works and honors
- Buildings: Jawaharlal Nehru University (1972); National Archives of India; Gautam Buddha University (2012)
- Projects: Jacob, Shine (21 March 2018). "600 railway stations may bear the stamp of India's top architects soon". Business Standard.

Website
- www.cpkukreja.com

C P Kukreja Architects (CPKA) is a multi-disciplinary design company, established in 1969, headquartered in New Delhi and New York.

C P Kukreja Architects was established in 1969 by architect C P Kukreja, after an education in Melbourne and Canada. C.P. Kukreja with his firm had been designing in various institutional projects, embassies, recreational, educational and housing projects etc.

At the age of 32, C.P. Kukreja designed the Jawaharlal Nehru University, which was a winning entry in a national design competition, completed in 1970. In May 2019, C.P. Kukreja died aged 80. Kukreja was also the author of the book ‘Tropical Architecture’ which was published in 1978 by McGraw Hill Education.

In 2019, the company acquired the Indian arm of Chicago-based design firm dbHMS.

C P Kukreja Architects, along with IDOM Spain, is designing one of India’s largest convention centers in Dwarka for the G20 Summit in 2022.

In 2021, The Government of India has awarded the project of Development of Ayodhya to C.P. Kukreja, Larsen & Toubro and Canada based firm Lea Associates.

== Awards ==
- Top 100 Global Architects in 2022 in the list of BD Online UK
- HUDCO Design Award 2020 by HRRL Township, Barmer, Rajasthan

== Notable works ==
- Jawaharlal Nehru University (JNU), New Delhi
- Ambadeep Towers, New Delhi]
- India International Convention Centre, Dwarka]
- Aerocity, Delhi
- Perto
