= Gautam Buddha University =

State university in Uttar Pradesh, India

Coordinates: 28.4215°N 77.5259°E

- Motto in English: Character, Creativity, Competence
- Type: State University (Government)
- Established: 2008 (18 years ago)
- Accreditation: NAAC B+
- Chancellor: Chief Minister of Uttar Pradesh
- Vice-Chancellor: Rana Pratap Singh
- Faculty: 200+
- Students: 3200
- Undergraduates: 1200
- Postgraduates: 1800
- Location: Greater Noida, Gautam Buddha Nagar, Uttar Pradesh, India - 201312
- Campus: Urban 511 acres (2.07 km^{2})
- Website: www.gbu.ac.in

Gautam Buddha University ("GBU") (Hindi: गौतम बुद्ध विश्वविद्यालय) is a university established by the Uttar Pradesh Gautam Buddha University Act 2002 (UP Act No. 9 of 2002) and came into existence in 2008. It is approved by University Grants Commission (UGC) under section 12-B and accredited by National Assessment and Accreditation Council (NAAC) with B+ grade. It is located in Greater Noida, Gautam Buddha Nagar in Uttar Pradesh, India. It is one of Uttar Pradesh's state government universities which commenced its first academic session in the year 2008. The university campus is spread over 511 acres (207 ha) and offers Bachelors, Masters and Doctoral degrees in engineering, Business Administration, Computer Applications, Biotechnology and Buddhist Studies and is mainly focused on research.

== History ==
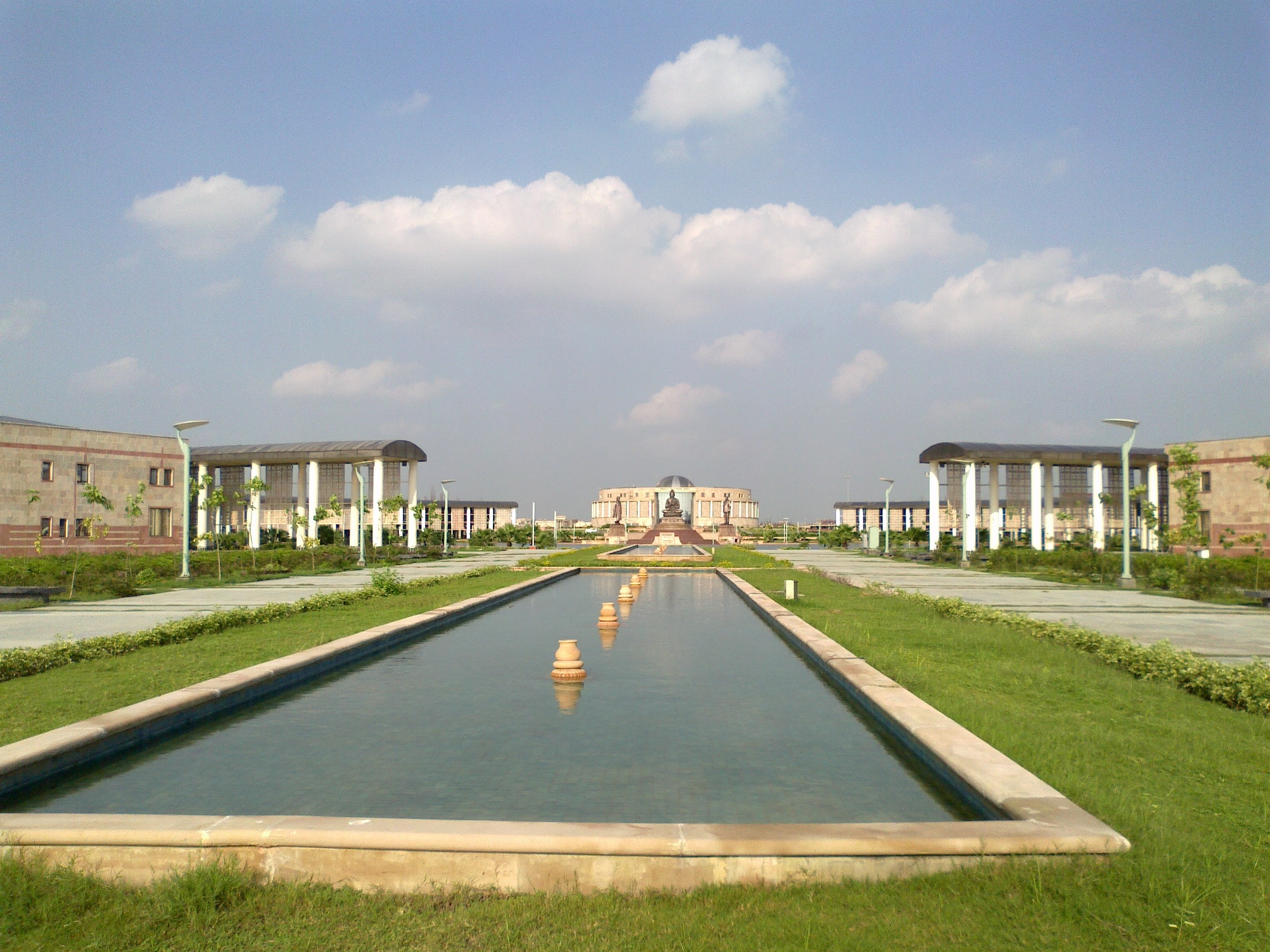
The Grand Walk at the Gautam Buddha University

Gautam Buddha University was the dream project of former chief minister of Uttar Pradesh, Ms Mayawati. The university was established by the Uttar Pradesh Government under the Gautam Buddha University Act of 2002 and began its first academic session in 2008. The university is fully funded by NOIDA and GNIDA authorities (undertakings of the Uttar Pradesh government) and is recognized by the University Grants Commission (UGC) of India. It is a member of the Association of Indian Universities (AIU). Gautam Buddha University has been accredited jointly by the Joint Accreditation System of Australia & New Zealand (JAS-ANZ), issued on 21 February 2015 after accessing and finding confirmation to the requirements of ISO 9001: 2008. Integrated Dual Degree Programme (BArch + MArch/MBA) in Architecture and Planning has been recognized by the Council of Architecture. M.Phil. (Clinical Psychology), 2 years Programme which has been recognized by the Rehabilitation Council of India. Integrated B.A. LLB programme has been approved by the Bar Council of India.

The university was inaugurated on 23 August 2008 by the then Chief Minister of Uttar Pradesh, Mayawati and was dedicated to the people. It was emphasized by the C P Kukreja Architects Managing Principal Dikshu C. Kukrej.

== Campus ==
Campus of Gautam Buddha University is situated Adjacent to Yamuna Expressway in Greater Noida.

== Organization and administration ==
=== Schools ===
==== School of Information & Communication Technology ====
The School of Information and Communication Technology offers undergraduate, postgraduate & doctoral programs.

The B.Tech. programs offered are: Computer Science & Engineering and Information Technology. The M.Tech. programs are: Computer Science, Information Communication & Technology and Electronics & Communication Engineering, with various specialisations.

==== School of Management ====
MBA was the first course started by GBU in 2008. The school has classroom computing facilities supported by a library of books, journals, films and databases. It has specialisation groups (HRM, Marketing, Finance, Operations, Strategy, Data Analytics etc.) that organises weekly activities. School of Management also has a 500-kW solar roof top which provides electricity to Greater Noida.

The school has three centres of excellence:

1. Centre for Entrepreneurship and Innovations
2. Centre for Management of Financial Services
3. Centre for Executive Education.

==== School of Biotechnology ====
The Department of Biotechnology is an interdisciplinary department with an amalgamation of expertise from diverse areas of basic and applied biology, mathematics, microbial, plant, animal sciences and computer sciences.

The department is running following programmes:

1. 5-Year Integrated Dual Degree Programme in BTech (Biotechnology) + MTech/MBA
2. MTech Biotechnology for Science Graduates
3. MTech Biotechnology for BTech/MSc candidates

with specialization in the areas of Genetic Engineering, Food technology and Bioinformatics.

==== School of Engineering ====
The School of Engineering offers leadership opportunities with technical and professional augmentation establishments viz. the GBU-IEEE student chapter etc. Integrated master's degree programs are offered by the School. The college is enriched by Civil, Electrical, Mechanical Engineering and Architecture and Regional Planning departments. Various departments under the School of Engineering are as follows:

- Department of Mechanical Engineering

The Department of Mechanical Engineering offers integrated dual degree in Mechanical Engineering with specializations in CAD/CAM and Manufacturing Engineering. The research focus of the department lays emphasis on innovations in the field of Machine Design, Production Engineering (CAD/CAM), Thermal Engineering and Production Engineering. Department of Mechanical Engineering is enriched with GBU-SAE student chapter which was started by mechanical engineering graduates in 2011. First batch of Mechanical Engineering students passed out in the year 2015.

- Department of Electrical Engineering

Department of Electrical Engineering is enriched with GBU-IEEE chapter which got the approval on 6 April 2012. Currently, the department is offering the integrated dual degree course in Electrical Engineering with specialization in Power System and Control & Instrumentation Engineering. The department is extending the facilities to carry out research work for Doctor of Philosophy (PhD) degree, R&D work for sponsored and consultancy projects and testing and consultancy work for industrial problems. The department has strong research focus in the field of Power System, Semiconductors, VLSI, Control and Instrumentation, System Design, Reliability Engineering, Power Electronic Drives, Industrial Automation and Control, High Voltage Engineering, Power Systems, Industrial and Biomedical Instrumentation, and various important areas of Electrical Engineering.

- Department of Civil Engineering

The department offers Degrees with in Civil Engineering with specializations in Environmental Engineering and Structural Engineering.

- Department of Architecture and Regional Planning

==== School of Law, Justice and Governance ====
One of the main academic programmes, the five-year integrated BA LLB, LLM & PhD. was started in July 2012 & 2017 respectively. In the first semester of the programme, students participate in moot court practice, debate, essay writing and project works.

==== School of Buddhist Studies and Civilization ====
The school offers academic programmes at post-graduate and research level including M.A., M.Phil., and PhD. It gives knowledge of Buddhist History, Philosophy, and Literature in Pali, Sanskrit, Chinese, Burmese, Sinhalese and Tibetan. With a library, a meditation centre, the school also enables the practice of Buddhist techniques of Vipassana meditation under supervision.

==== School of Vocational and Applied Sciences ====
This school has courses related to Applied science and food processing Btech in food processing and technology Mtech in food processing and technology MSc in food processing BSc courses.The school is running M.Sc. Environmental Science, M.Sc. Applied Chemistry, M.Sc.Applied Physics and M.Sc. Applied Mathematics.

== Academics ==
=== Courses ===
Undergraduate courses

- (BTech) in Artificial Intelligence, Civil Engineering, Mechanical Engineering, Electrical Engineering, Computer Science Engineering & Electronics and Communication Engineering, Food Processing and Technology, Biotechnology, Integrated Dual Degree Programme BBA-MBA, Integrated Dual Degree Programme BBA-MBA, BA+ LLB (5-Year Integrated Programme), Bachelor in Architecture (BArch), BTech in Information Technology (IT), BSc, B. Voc. (Bachelor of Vocational Studies) in Food Processing, B.A. (Hons.)-MA in Buddhist Studies and Civilization, B.A.(Hons.)-Economics, Political Science, English, Social Work, History, Urdu, Mass Communication, Psychology, BSc-Chemistry, Physics, Math.

Postgraduate courses

- M. Plan (Master of Urban and Regional Planning), MTech in Power System Engineering, MTech in Instrumentation and Control, MTech in Power Electronics and Drives, MTech (Biotech), MTech in Specialization in Software Engineering, MTech in Specialization in Intelligent System and Robotics, MTech in Specialization in Wireless Communication and Networks, MTech in Specialization in VLSI Design, MTech in Computer Science, MTech in Embedded System, MTech in Food Processing and Technology, MSc in Applied Chemistry, MSc.in Applied Physics, MSc in Applied Mathematics, MSc in Environmental Science, MSc in Food Science, MA in Buddhist Studies & Civilization, M.Phil. in Buddhist Studies & Civilization, MA in education, MA in History and Civilization, MA in economics, Planning and Development, MA in English, MA in Hindi, MA in Urdu, MA in Mass Communication, Master in Social Work, MA in sociology, MA in Political Science and International Relations, MA/MSc in Applied Psychology, Master in Disability Rehabilitation & Administration, M.Phil. in Clinical Psychology, Master in Public Policy and Governance

Doctoral courses

- PhD (Electrical Engg.), (Power converters & Drives, Control System Optimization, Biomedical Instrumentation & Image Processing), PhD in Civil Engineering, PhD (Architecture & Planning), PhD (Mechanical Engg.), PhD in management, PhD in Applied Chemistry, PhD in Applied Physics, PhD in Applied Mathematics, PhD in various areas of Biotechnology, PhD in law

=== Admission criteria ===
The university conducts an entrance examination for each course. The candidates can appear for these examinations depending upon the fulfillment of the eligibility criteria. GPTU is the test for undergraduate level courses. GPT is the test for postgraduate level courses.

=== International collaborations ===
Besides having industrial association with home industries, the institute has close industrial partnership with the following organizations abroad:

- International Business Academy, Kolding, Denmark
- Queensland University of Technology, Brisbane, Australia
- Sheffield Hallam University, Sheffield, UK
- Manchester Metropolitan University, Manchester, UK

In addition to the above, the university is in the process of formalizing tie-up with the following universities:

- Russian State University for the Humanities, Moscow, Russia
- Moscow State University, Moscow, Russia
- University of East London, London, UK

=== Sponsored projects ===
The School of Biotechnology and School of Vocational Studies and Applied Sciences are administering a total of 21 sponsored projects in the university as per now funded by various agencies namely: Department of Biotechnology, Council of Scientific and Industrial Research, Department of Science and Technology and Indian Council of Medical Research.

=== Support facilities ===
- Bodhisattva Dr. Bhim Rao Ambedkar Central Library

The library is located on the outer circle of the schools as the background of Tathagat's statue.

- Corporate Relation Cell
- Central Computer Center
- Auditoriums

GBU has 8 auditoriums in its campus :- Main Auditorium, Gautam Buddha University (Capacity 1765 seat), Auditorium 1(Capacity 425 seat), Auditorium 2, (Capacity 225 seat), Auditorium 3, (Capacity 100 seat), Auditorium 4, G (Capacity 90 seat), School Auditorium, School of Management (Capacity 300 seat), School Auditorium, School of Biotechnology (Capacity 300 seat), School Auditorium, School of Engineering, Block-B (Capacity 300 seat), School Auditorium, School of Buddhist Studies & Civilization (300 seats) Main auditorium costs Rs 88 crore.

==== Outdoor sports ====
- Cricket stadium with 650 seating capacity Pavilion, Astro-turf hockey stadium with 650-seat pavilion, Synthetic athletic cum soccer stadium with 650-seat pavilion, Practice arena for soccer and athletics, Synthetic basketball and volleyball arena with floodlight facility, Cricket practice pitches, Synthetic tennis arena with flood lights, etc.

==== Indoor sports ====
Indoor stadium of GBU was inaugurated by chancellor Akhilesh Yadav on 11 April 2015. Its estimated cost is said to be 78 crore while Auditorium costs 88 crore. Indoor stadium of GBU has:

- Tennis and Table tennis, Badminton, Squash, Gymnasium, Judo and wrestling, Gymnastics, Billiards and snooker, Weightlifting, Boxing, etc.

== Student life ==
=== Hostels ===
There are a total of 19 hostels in the university, all situated inside the campus. There is also a shopping complex for students on the campus.

=== Student bodies ===
The cultural council of the university consists of following student bodies: Art/ Painting Club, Social Service club, Debating society, Dramatics club, Literary club, Photography club, Music club, Adventure club, Dance club, Audio-Visual Education club, etc.

== In popular media ==
Many shots of the movie Baby (2015) have been filmed at the university campus. Similarly, in February 2014, many shots of the movie Kill Dil were taken here.

Some scenes of first season the Netflix show Leila (2019) and the south Indian movie Kaappaan (2019) were also shot in the university. The Bollywood movies, Parmanu: The Story of Pokhran (2018), and Chhapaak (2020) filmed some scenes in the campus as well.

The university was the venue of the 2015 edition of International Tent Pegging Championship. The national event Pro Wrestling League 2016 was held at indoor stadium of the university on 19 and 20 December 2016. Further, the National Youth Fest was hosted by Gautam Buddha University in 2018.

== See also ==
- Siddharth University, in Siddharth Nagar in Uttar Pradesh in India.
- Central Institute of Buddhist Studies, in Leh in Ladakh in India.
- Central Institute of Higher Tibetan Studies, in Varanasi in Uttar Pradesh in India.
- Lumbini Buddhist University, in Lumbini in Nepal.
- Sanchi University of Buddhist-Indic Studies, in Sanchi in Madhya Pradesh in India.
- List of Buddhist universities across the world
