= Indian Statistical Service =

Government agency of India

- State Emblem of India

- Flag of India

The Indian Statistical Service (abbreviated as ISS) (Hindi: भारतीय सांख्यिकी सेवा) is a civil service under Group A of the Central Civil Services of the executive branch of the Government of India. ISS is a civil service with high degree of proficiency in Statistical methods and applications. With the main mandate of producing quality Official Statistics with better methods and techniques, provide solutions to the data and information needs and interpretation and analysis of statistics, a majority portion of the probationary training programme is to be devoted to acquiring of technical knowledge in the field of official statistics, economics, financial statistics, survey methodology and social etc. The posts are recruited through UPSC examination. The minimum eligibility criterion is Bachelor's degree with Statistics or Mathematical Statistics or Applied Statistics as one of the subject.

== History ==
The committee under the chairmanship of Shri V.T.Krishnamachari, the then Deputy Chairman of erstwhile Planning Commission was constituted for examining the matter of establishing statistical cadres after the cabinet decision of 26 July 1952. The Committee submitted its report in September 1953 and recommended formation of ‘Statistical and Economic Advisory Service’. However, Professor Prasanta Chandra Mahalanobis, the then Honorary Statistical Adviser to the Cabinet did not favor the idea of a combined Statistical and Economic Advisory Service and suggested an alternative scheme for creation of a Central Statistical Pool. After deliberating on various contradictory views, the Cabinet on 12 February 1958 decided that two separate services namely Statistical Service and Economic Service should be formed. This decision paved the way for formation of ISS and finally the service was constituted in 1961 as a cadre of qualified professional with core discipline of Statistics.

The Indian Statistical Service along with Indian Economic Service (IES) was constituted as a Group-A Central Service on 1 November 1961 by a Gazette notification. Direct recruitment in the Service was initiated in 1967 through an examination organized by Union Public Service Commission (UPSC) and the first batch joined in October 1968. The Indian Statistical System is a decentralised system and the officers of Indian Statistical Service have pivotal role in compiling Official Statistics at central level for use of government and nongovernment entities.

== Cadre strength ==
The Ministry of Statistics and Programme Implementation (MoSPI) is the Cadre Controlling Authority (CCA) for the ISS officers. Officers of ISS cadre having a strength of 814 sanctioned posts are serving in various Ministries and offices across the country at different levels.The CCA is responsible for policy decision related to service matters and the management of the service on the basis of the service rules notified time to time.

At the entry grade of ISS i.e. Junior Time Scale, 50% of the posts are recruited through UPSC examination. The minimum eligibility criterion is Bachelor’s degree with Statistics or Mathematical Statistics or Applied Statistics as one of the subject. Like any other government service, ISS officers are put to probation for a period of two years on joining the service . Remaining 50% by promotion of officers from Subordinate Statistical Service (SSS). The National Statistical System Training Academy (NSSTA), Greater Noida (UP) is the training academy for the ISS officers. The direct recruits undergo a two-years comprehensive probationary training comprising the foundation course, training on survey methodology, micro & macro economics and econometrics at the Indian Statistical Institutes, training on various modules at several national institutes of repute across the country, attachment with different Ministries, National Statistical Office (NSO) and State Directorate of Economics and Statistics (DES) etc.

The Cadre strength of ISS is periodically reviewed by the ISS Board chaired by the Cabinet Secretary and the final Cadre strength is approved by the Cabinet. The latest Cadre Review was approved by the Cabinet on 29 July 2015 and the ISS rules 2016 were notified on 7 June 2016. At present, the cadre strength of the service is 814 and distributed in various grades as under:

Sl. No.	Grade / Designation	Pay Structure	Sanctioned Strength
1	HAG Plus (Director General)	Level -16	5
2	HAG (Additional Director General)	Level -15	18
3	SAG (Deputy Director General)	Level -14	136
4	JAG/NFSG (Joint Director/Director)	Level-12 & 13	176
5	STS (Deputy Director)	Level -11	179
6	JTS (Assistant Director)	Level-10	300

== Role of ISS Officers ==
Generally, the ISS officers serve at various ministries and departments as directors and secretaries. The cadre posts of the ISS are spread across 40 different ministries of the Central Government. Besides manning cadre posts, the ISS officers go on deputation to serve at various domestic and international organizations such as UN bodies, foreign governments, state governments, PSUs etc.

Each ministry/department is expected to maintain relevant databases and also undertake monitoring and evaluation of all the concerned projects and programmes. The ISS officers are involved in compilation of different kinds of statistics and formulation/monitoring/evaluation of different schemes in these ministries/departments and are under the administrative control of the concerned ministries.

== Notable members ==
- T C A Anant – Former Member of Union Public Service Commission
- Pranab K. Sen - Former Chief Statistician of India
- Dr Rattan Chand - Former Adviser at World Bank Group

== See also ==
- Order of Precedence of India
- Civil Services of India
- Indian Economic Service
