= Barigarh =

Barigarh JUJHARNAGAR
- City
- Location in Madhya Pradesh, India Barigarh (India)
- Coordinates: 25°14′2″N 80°2′3″E
- Country: India
- State: Madhya Pradesh
- District: Chhatarpur

Area
  - Total: 10 km^{2} (3.9 sq mi)

Population (2011)
  - Total: 15,288
  - Density: 1,500/km^{2} (4,000/sq mi)

Languages Hindi And Bundelkhandi
  - Official: Hindi
- Time zone: UTC+5:30 (IST)
- Postal code: 471510
- ISO 3166 code: IN-MP
- Vehicle registration: MP
- Education: Government Boys Higher Secondary School, Barigarh Government Girls High School, Barigarh Pahad Singh PG College, Barigarh Akhand Jyoti School, Barigarh Gyan Shakti School, Barigarh Primary School No. 01, 02, 03, Barigarh Kendriya Shala, Barigarh Madarsa kgn, Barigarh Sarswati Gyan Mandir, Barigarh Ideal Public English School, Barigarh Star Light English public school, jujharnagar Little Kingdom English school, Barigarh

Barigarh is a town and a nagar panchayat, Chhatarpur district, in the state of Madhya Pradesh, India.

== Demographics ==
As of 2001 India census, Barigarh had a population of 8,589. Males constitute 54% of the population and females 46%. Barigarh has an average literacy rate of 50%, lower than the national average of 59.5%; with 65% of the males and 35% of females literate. 19% of the population is under 6 years of age.
