= Noida Sector 15 metro station =

Metro station in Delhi, India

Noida Sector 15

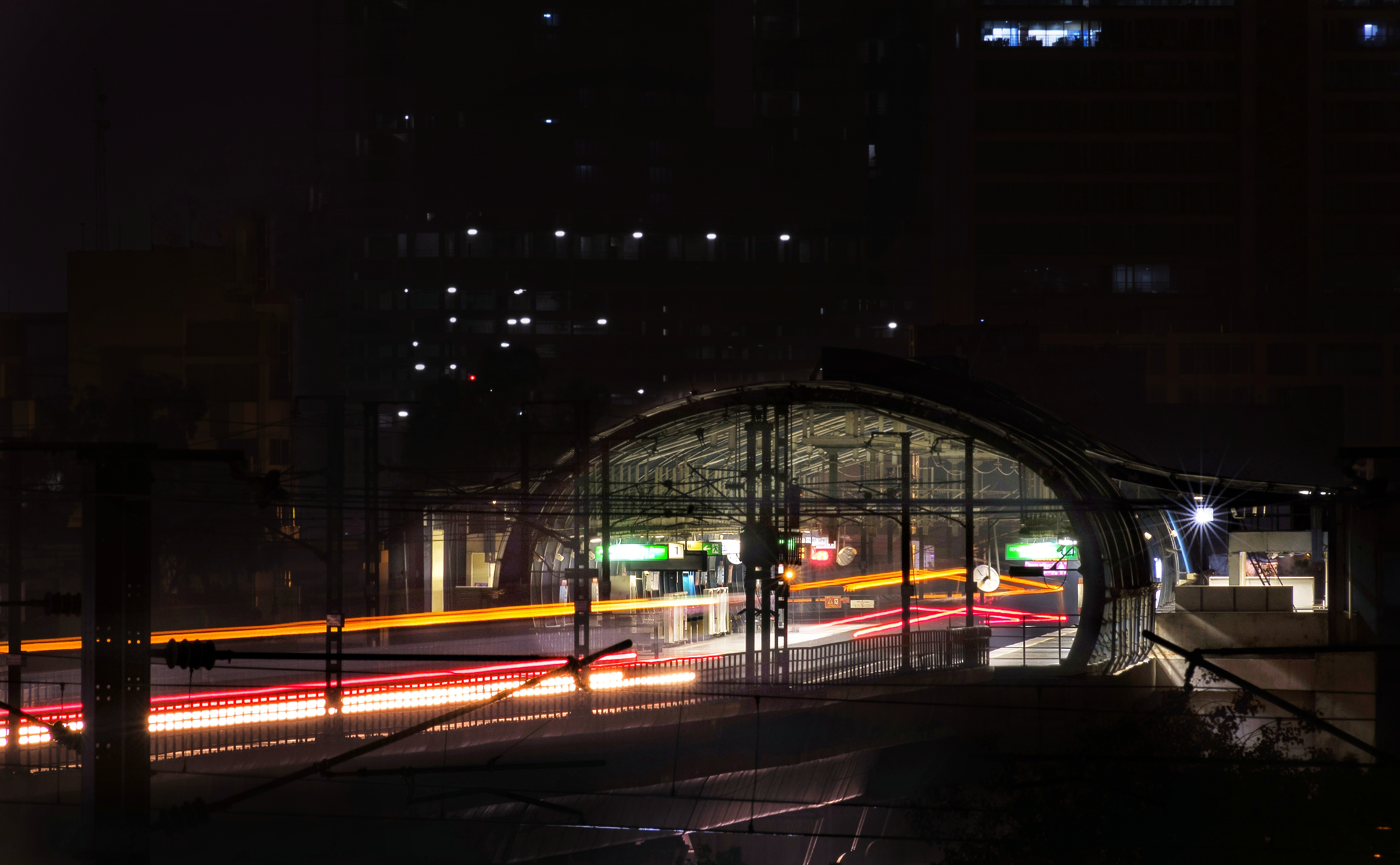

General information
- Location: Captain Vijayant Thapar Marg, Sector 15, Noida, Uttar Pradesh 201301
- Coordinates: 28°35′07″N 77°18′42″E
- System: Delhi Metro station
- Owner: Delhi Metro Rail Corporation Ltd. (DMRC)
- Line: Blue Line
- Platforms: Side platform; Platform-1 → Noida Electronic City; Platform-2 → Dwarka Sector 21
- Tracks: 2

Construction
- Structure type: Elevated
- Platform levels: 2
- Accessible: Yes

Other information
- Station code: NSFT

History
- Opened: 12 November 2009; 16 years ago
- Electrified: 25 kV 50 Hz AC through overhead catenary

Passengers
- 2015: Average 26,420 /day 819,007 (Month of Jan)

Services
| Preceding station | Delhi Metro | Following station |
|---|---|---|
| New Ashok Nagar towards Dwarka Sector 21 | Blue Line | Noida Sector 16 towards Noida Electronic City |
Route map
Location

The Noida Sector 15 is a metro station on the Blue Line of the Delhi Metro. This is the First station after New Ashok Nagar metro station. The station includes a variety of outlets and shops, including medical, garment, and party shops, as well as libraries and corporate spaces.

== Station layout ==
| L2 | Side platform | Doors will open on the left |
| L2 | Platform 1 South East bound | Towards → Noida Electronic City; Next Station: Noida Sector 16 |
| L2 | Platform 2 Westbound | Towards ← Dwarka Sector 21; Next Station: New Ashok Nagar (UP-Delhi Border) |
| L2 | Side platform | Doors will open on the left |
| L1 | Concourse | Fare control, station agent, Metro Card vending machines, crossover |
| G | Street Level | Exit/Entrance |

== Facilities ==
List of available ATM at Noida Sector 15 metro station are HDFC Bank, Punjab National Bank.

== See also ==
- List of Delhi Metro stations
- Transport in Delhi
- Delhi Metro Rail Corporation
- Delhi Suburban Railway
- List of rapid transit systems in India
