= South Patel Nagar =

- District Subdivision
- Location in Delhi, India
- Coordinates: 28.6505°N 77.1691°E
- Country: India
- State: Delhi
- District: West Delhi

Government
  - Body: Municipal Corporation Of Delhi(North)

Languages
  - Official: Hindi, English
- Time zone: UTC+5:30 (IST)
- Postal code: 110008
- Lok Sabha constituency: New Delhi
- Vidhan Sabha constituency: Patel Nagar
- Current Member of the Legislative Assembly: Raaj Kumar Anand
- Civic agency: Municipal Corporation Of Delhi(North)
- MP: Meenakshi Lekhi

South Patel Nagar is a place in Central Delhi. It covers the Southern Part of the Patel Nagar Area. In the past South Patel Nagar was counted in Central Delhi but due to the continued city expansion, South Patel Nagar and its subdivision colonies like New Ranjit Nagar now come under West Delhi. However, among the three divisions of Municipal Corporation Of Delhi(MCD), North, South and East, South Patel Nagar falls under MCD-North.

== Area ==
The PIN Code of West Patel Nagar is 110008. This area is surrounded by the following colonies:

- West Patel Nagar – NORTH
- East Patel Nagar – NORTH
- Rajendra Nagar – EAST
- Shadi Kham Pur – WEST
- Ranjit Nagar – SOUTH
- Rajendra Place – NORTH-EAST

The main hospital in this region is Sardar Patel Hospital. This is a Government Hospital. B.L.Kapoor Memorial Hospital is another hospital that is very close to South Patel Nagar.

Siddharth Hotel is a five star hotel located at North-East of one end of South Patel Nagar.

The main cinema hall in this region is Satyam Cineplex, West Patel Nagar. Earlier there used to be another hall in South Patel Nagar, by the name of Vivek Cinema. But later Vivek Cinema was demolished from construction of Patel Nagar Metro Station. There is another hall by the name of Rachna Cinema in the Rajendra Place region, but it is also not operational for more than a few years.

== Metro station ==
There are two metro stations in or near South Patel Nagar: Patel Nagar and Rajendra Place. Patel Nagar metro station is suitable for travelling to some parts of South Patel Nagar, East Patel Nagar and West Patel Nagar. Rajendra Place metro station is suitable for travelling to Rajendra Place, Rajendra Nagar, the eastern part of East and South Patel Nagar. South Patel Nagar comes under the jurisdiction of New Delhi Lok Sabha Constituency. The current MP is Bansuri Swaraj of Bhartiya Janata Party.

== Politics ==
As far as Vidhan Sabha is concerned, South Patel Nagar falls under Patel Nagar constituency. The current MLA is Raaj Kumar Anand of the Aam Aadmi Party. He succeeded Hazari Lal Chauhan, who also was a part of Aam Aadmi Party.
