= East Patel Nagar =

- District Subdivision
- Location in Delhi, India
- Coordinates: 28.6505°N 77.1691°E
- Country: India
- State: Delhi
- District: Central Delhi

Government
  - Body: North Delhi Municipal Corporation

Languages
  - Official: Hindi, English
- Time zone: UTC+5:30 (IST)
- Postal code: 110008
- Lok Sabha constituency: New Delhi
- Vidhan Sabha constituency: Patel Nagar
- Current Member of the Legislative Assembly: Raaj Kumar Anand
- Civic agency: North Delhi Municipal Corporation
- MP: Meenakshi Lekhi

East Patel Nagar is a region of Central Delhi. It covers the eastern part of the Patel Nagar area. Among the three divisions of Municipal Corporation of Delhi, North, South and East, East Patel Nagar falls under North Delhi Municipal Corporation.

== Area ==
The PIN Code of East Patel Nagar is 110008. The area is surrounded by the following colonies:

- Rajendra Place – east
- South Patel Nagar – south
- Ranjit Nagar – south
- West Patel Nagar – west
- Rajendra Nagar – southeast
- Prasad Nagar – northeast

The main hospital in the region is Sardar Patel Hospital, a government facility. The B.L.Kapoor Memorial Hospital is another hospital that is very close to East Patel Nagar.

Jaypee Siddharth Hotel is a five star hotel located at one end of East Patel Nagar.

The main cinema hall in this region is Satyam Cineplex. It is located in West Patel Nagar.

Vivek Cinema was another hall located here but it was demolished to construct the Patel Nagar Metro Station. There is another hall by the name of Rachna in the Rajendra Place region, but it has not been operational for several years.

== Metro station ==
There are two metro stations in or near East Patel Nagar: Patel Nagar and Rajendra Place.

== Politics ==
East Patel Nagar comes under the jurisdiction of New Delhi Lok Sabha Constituency. The current MP is Meenakshi Lekhi of the Bhartiya Janata Party.

As far as Vidhan Sabha is concerned, East Patel Nagar falls under Patel Nagar constituency. The current MLA is Raaj Kumar Anand of the Aam Aadmi Party. He succeeded Hazari Lal Chauhan, who also was a part of Aam Aadmi Party.
