= Pusa Road =

Road in New Delhi, India

Pusa Road (Sadhu Vaswani Marg) is an arterial road and one of the major roads of New Delhi, India. Several prominent educational institutions and hospitals are located on the road. The neighbourhoods of Karol Bagh and Rajendra Nagar are respectively on the northern and southern sides of the road. It forms part of the Patel Road - Pusa Road - Link Road corridor that connects West Delhi to Connaught Place. This is one of the busiest arterial routes in the city; according to a 2014 estimate, it carries 170,000 vehicles per day.

Pusa Road takes its name from the Indian Agricultural Research Institute (IARI), formerly known as Pusa Institute, which is located at the western end of the road. Officially, the name was changed some years ago to Sadhu Vaswani Marg, but the old name continues to be in use.

Starting from the roundabout next to the IARI campus (Pusa Roundabout), where it meets with Patel Road, K. S. Krishnan Marg and Shankar Road, Pusa Road extends eastward, ending at a large roundabout where it meets with Arya Samaj Road, Faiz Road, Link Road and Vandemataram Marg. The Blue Line of the Delhi Metro runs overhead along the entire length of the road. Two metro stations - Rajendra Place and Karol Bagh - are located on Pusa Road.

== History ==
After 1911, when the capital of British India was moved from Calcutta to Delhi, the construction of the new capital began. Residents of villages in the area where New Delhi would come up were moved to Karol Bagh, until then a wild and rocky area. This area is to the west of the walled city of Shahjahanabad, which was now referred to as Old Delhi. During the 1920s, Shahjahanabad had become overcrowded, and some of its inhabitants moved into the western suburbs.

Up to the early 1930s, the area to the south and south-west of Karol Bagh was not urbanised. All this changed in 1934, when a major earthquake hit parts of Nepal and Eastern India. The Imperial Agricultural Research Institute, located at Pusa in Bihar, was severely damaged. The colonial administration decided to relocate the institute to Delhi. In 1936, Pusa Institute (as it was popularly called) was set up outside the urban limits of Delhi, on what used to be prime agricultural land. The road which would provide access to Pusa Institute from the new capital city was built along the southern border of Karol Bagh, and naturally enough named Pusa Road.

During the next two decades, Pusa Road was a destination for the elite mercantile class who didn't went into either Old Delhi or New Delhi. A number of large private residential buildings came up on the road, many of which still exist. These have been described as "desi bungalows", and have a unique niche in the historical and architectural history of the city and they are big, high value properties.

After the independence of India and Partition in 1947, the city was flooded by refugees from what had now become Pakistan. Areas to the south of Pusa Road now began to be urbanised. West of the roundabout, Patel Nagar came up. Further west, Punjabi Bagh and other areas in what is today West Delhi began to be developed. The nature of Pusa Road changed as a consequence. It remains sought-after destination. For some years, until Chanakyapuri was ready for occupancy, Pusa Road was home to some foreign missions in the newly independent country.

In the mid to late 1950s, land on Pusa Road was allotted to a number of hospitals and schools. By 1975, most of them had completed construction, changing the look of the road. A number of institutions which help prepare aspirants for various competitive examinations also came up during this period.

In recent years, Pusa Road has become a very busy road since it forms part of the main corridor linking West Delhi to Connaught Place. The Delhi Urban Art Commission, in a recent report (2018), has taken note of the high volume of traffic at the Pusa Roundabout, especially on the Patel Road - Pusa Road alignment, and proposed major restructuring.

== Junctions ==
There are two major junctions.

- From the first, Guru Ravi Das Marg extends northwards into Karol Bagh up to Dev Nagar.
- From the second, Sir Gangaram Hospital Marg goes in a south-westerly direction up to Shankar Road.

== Important places on the road ==
=== Educational institutions ===
- Springdales School, Pusa Road, is located at the eastern end of the road, at the intersection of Pusa Road and Vandemataram Marg. The school was founded in 1955 and moved to its present location in 1962.
- St. Michael's Senior Secondary School, established in 1980, is located to the west of Springdales School.
- DTEA Senior Secondary School, Pusa Road, founded in 1953, is located to the west of St. Michael's School. It is the second of the DTEA schools.
- Ramjas School, Pusa Road, is located further to the west. It was established by the Ramjas Foundation in 1971.
- IHM pusa, established in 1962,

=== Hospitals ===
- BLK Super-Speciality Hospital is a 650-bed hospital located at the junction of Pusa Road and Guru Ravi Das Marg. It was inaugurated in January 1959.
- City Hospital is a 120-bed hospital located at the intersection of Pusa Road and Sir Gangaram Hospital Marg.
- Kolmet Hospital is a 39-bed hospital located near Karol Bagh metro station. It was established in 1990.
- Jeewan Nursing Home and Hospital is located on the south side of Pusa Road, near Karol Bagh metro station. It was founded in 1948 and moved to its present location in 1956.

=== Commercial Complex ===
- Rajendra Place is a multistoreyed commercial complex located on the northern side of Pusa Road.
