= West Patel Nagar =

- District Subdivision
- Location in Delhi, India
- Coordinates: 28.6505°N 77.1691°E
- Country: India
- State: Delhi
- District: West Delhi

Government
  - Body: North Delhi Municipal Corporation

Languages
  - Official: Hindi, English
- Time zone: UTC+5:30 (IST)
- Postal code: 110008
- Lok Sabha constituency: New Delhi
- Vidhan Sabha constituency: Patel Nagar
- Current Member of the Legislative Assembly: Raaj Kumar Anand
- Civic agency: North Delhi Municipal Corporation
- MP: Meenakshi Lekhi

West Patel Nagar is a place in West Delhi. It covers the Western Part of the Patel Nagar Area. In the past West Patel Nagar was counted in Central Delhi but due continues City expansion West Patel Nagar and its Sub division colonies like New Ranjit Nagar or Baljeet Nagar come under West Delhi. However, among the three divisions of Municipal Corporation Of Delhi(MCD), North, South and East, West Patel Nagar falls under MCD-North

== Area ==
The PIN Code of West Patel Nagar is 110008. This area is surrounded by the following colonies:

- East Patel Nagar – EAST
- South Patel Nagar – SOUTH
- Shadi Kham Pur – SOUTH
- Baljit Nagar – WEST
- Baba Farid puri – NORTH
- Anand Parbat – NORTH
- Guru Nanak Nagar – SOUTH
- New Ranjeet Nagar – West-South

District areas of West Patel Nagar and its sub division New Ranjeet Nagar change time to time because of expansion of city. For example:

- It comes Under Central Delhi district if you select/search area by Postal Office (oldest way of mapping city and country)
- It comes under New Delhi district if you select/search by voter ID website (little more modern map of India)
- It comes under West delhi district if you apply for latest district service like marriage certificate or apply for driving licence (latest and future map plan for Delhi due to rapid expansion of city).

The main hospital in this region is Sardar Patel Hospital. This is a Government Hospital.

The main cinema hall in this region is Satyam Cineplex, New Ranjeet Nagar. It is a multiplex cinema hall. Earlier there used to be another hall in the region by the name of Vivek Cinema. But later Vivek Cinema was demolished for construction of Patel Nagar Metro Station.

Jaypee Siddharth Hotel is a five-star hotel located at the Eastern part of one end of East Patel Nagar. It is the nearest five-star hotel to this area.

== Metro station ==
There are two metro stations in or near West Patel Nagar: Patel Nagar and Shadipur. The Shadipur Metro Station is suitable for travelling to some parts of West Patel Nagar, Baljit Nagar, Shadi Kham Pur, Guru Nanak Nagar and Baba Farid Puri. Patel Nagar metro station is suitable for travelling to some parts of South Patel Nagar, East Patel Nagar, West Patel Nagar and Baba Farid Puri.

== Politics ==
West Patel Nagar comes under the jurisdiction of New Delhi Lok Sabha Constituency. The current MP is Meenakshi Lekhi of Bhartiya Janata Party(BJP). As far as Vidhan Sabha is concerned, West Patel Nagar falls under Patel Nagar constituency. The current MLA is Raaj Kumar Anand of the Aam Aadmi Party. He succeeded Hazari Lal Chauhan, who also was a part of Aam Aadmi Party.
