= Vande Mataram (disambiguation) =

"Vande Mataram" is the official national song of India and the origin of the patriotic cry of the Indian independence movement.

Vande Mataram or Bande Mataram may also refer to:

- Vande Mataram (album), patriotic studio album by Indian composer A.R.Rahman
- Bande Mataram (publication), English language newspaper founded in India in 1905 (published first in 1906) by Bipin Chandra Pal and later edited by Sri Aurobindo
- Bande Mataram (Paris publication), Indian nationalist publication published in Paris begun in September 1909 by Bhikaji Cama
- Vande Mataram Flag, flag of the Indian independence movement
- Vandae Maatharam, a 2010 bilingual Indian film directed by T. Aravind and starring Mammootty
- Vande Mataram (1939 film), an Indian Telugu-language film
- Vande Mataram (1985 film), a 1985 Telugu film directed by T.Krishna
- Vande Matharam (2001 film), a 2001 Kannada film directed by Om Prakash Rao
- Vande Mataram College, college of the Delhi University
- Vandemataram Srinivas (born 1962), Indian music director
- Vandemataram Marg, road in New Delhi, India
