= Ridge Road =

A ridge road is a road or track, usually ancient, that runs along the ridge formed by a line of hills. Ridge Road may refer to:

== Roads ==
Canada

- Ridge Road, formerly Manitoba Provincial Road 303, in the Rural Municipality of Hanover

India

- Vandemataram Marg, formerly Upper Ridge Road or Ridge Road, New Delhi, India

Ireland

- Esker Riada, also known as Ridge Road

United States

- Blue Ridge Road, a New York State Scenic Byway in Essex County, New York
- Ridge Road (Western New York)
- Ridge Route in California
- Trail Ridge Road, one of the highest roads in the US, located in Rocky Mountain National Park
- U.S. Route 6 Business (Gary, Indiana), a former route, part of which was named Ridge Road

== Others ==
- "Ridge Road", a 2005 song by T-Pain from Rappa Ternt Sanga
