= Vandemataram Marg =

Vandemataram Marg (alternate spelling Vande Mataram Marg) is an arterial road in New Delhi, India. It runs through the central section of the Delhi Ridge and connects Karol Bagh to Dhaula Kuan. It was earlier called Upper Ridge Road, frequently shortened to Ridge Road, and is still often referred to by this name. For most areas of North Delhi, the shortest route to Delhi airport lies through the entire length of Vandemataram Marg. It stretches in a south-westerly direction from a roundabout at its northern (north-eastern) end, where it meets with Pusa Road (Sadhu Vaswani Marg), Arya Samaj Road, Faiz Road and Link Road, to Dhaula Kuan crossing at its southern (south-western) end. The Airport Express line of the Delhi Metro runs overhead along a 2km stretch of the road. Running through a forested area, Vandemataram Marg has been called "the greenest road of Delhi".

== Junctions ==
- The major junction on Vandemataram Marg is the roundabout where Shankar Road intersects it, with Mandir Lane also proceeding eastward from the crossing.
- South of the roundabout, Professor Ram Nath Vij Road leads to New Rajinder Nagar in the west.
- Close to the southern end, Simon Bolivar Road heads southeast, providing a connection with Chanakyapuri.

== Important places on the road ==
=== Public areas ===
- The Buddha Jayanti Park, opened to the public in 1964, occupies a stretch of almost a kilometre on the road's east side.
- Rabindra Rangshala is an 8000-seat amphitheatre. A cultural hub of the city for three decades, it has now fallen into disuse due to environmental concerns.
- Close to the northern end of the road, inside the forest, are the remains of a 14th-century hunting lodge called Bhuli Bhatiyari Ka Mahal, believed by some to be haunted.

=== Institutions ===
- The Central Police Radio Training Institute (CPRTI), established in 1971 by the Ministry of Home Affairs, Government of India, is adjacent to Rabindra Rangshala.
- Springdales School, founded in 1955, is located at the northern end, at the intersection of Pusa Road and Vandemataram Marg.
- Army Public School is located on the eastern side of the road, close to the southern end.
- An ashram of controversial godman Asaram is located opposite Rabindra Rangshala.
