= Delhi Milk Scheme =

Delhi Milk Scheme is a subordinate office of Department of Animal Husbandry, Dairying and Fisheries, Ministry of Agriculture, Government of India.

== History ==
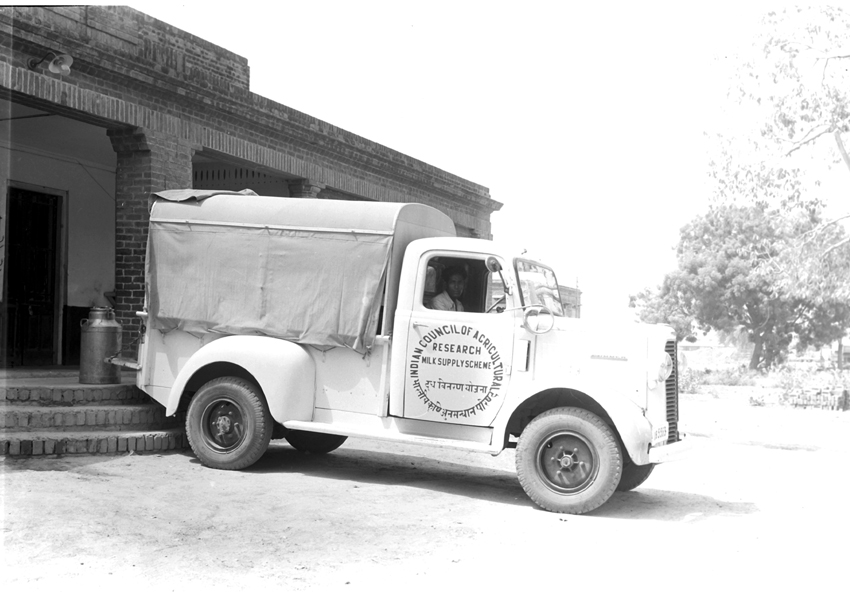
Delhi Milk Supply Scheme Van on its round, 1951

Delhi Milk Supply Scheme under India Council of Agricultural Research was underway after independence of India to provide milk in Delhi. Delhi Milk Scheme (DMS) was commissioned on 1 November 1959 with purpose of providing milk to people of Delhi. It was inaugurated by the then President of India Rajendra Prasad and Prime Minister of India Jawaharlal Nehru. It was the only organised dairy firm in Delhi then. It incurred heavy losses in 2010s so it was planned to be leased. In June 2018, Delhi Government had invited milk cooperatives to run Delhi Milk Scheme on lease for 30 years. To continue with lease proposal, the Union Agriculture Ministry released a bid document for the same in June 2018 as DMS had accumulated losses of up to nearly Rs 900 crore and has only 6% market share in the capital's milk market but has huge real estate and retail infrastructure in prime areas of Delhi.

== Products ==
Other than milk, it also produces other milk products like butter, ghee, dahi, paneer, chhas etc.

As of 2016, DMS sells around 2.70 lakh litre milk a day. It has 600 booths and 500 other outlets. It has around 149 acres in the National Capital Region, Delhi. Its plant is located in West Patel Nagar, with a processing capacity of 5 lakh litres of milk per day and spread over 25 acres. DMS currently until 2018 had five milk collection and chilling centres and 566 milk booths located at various places in Delhi and NCR(National Capital Region). Its planned that the manpower of DMS of around 700 employees shall be placed in the 'surplus pool' and can be redeployed elsewhere by the Delhi government in case they opt not to work for the cooperative or are not selected to work for it. It was also decided that the Delhi government will retain ownership of DMS land, buildings and the milk brand, but the bid winner will have the right to use these assets and the brand for the lease period of 30 years and decide price of the milk product.
