= Rajesh Lilothia =

Indian politician

President of All India Congress Committee (Scheduled Castes department)
- In office 25 December 2021 – 4 June 2025
- Preceded by: Nitin Raut
- Succeeded by: Rajendra Pal Gautam

Member of Delhi Legislative Assembly
- In office 2008–2013
- Preceded by: Rama Kant Goswami
- Succeeded by: Veena Anand
- Constituency: Patel Nagar

Personal details
- Born: New Delhi
- Party: Indian National Congress
- Spouse: Madhu Rajesh Lilothia
- Children: Tanvee Lilothia
- Profession: Politician

Rajesh Lilothia (born 4 July 1969) is an Indian politician of Indian National Congress from Delhi. He was elected to Delhi Legislative Assembly from Patel Nagar constituency in the 4th Delhi Assembly and currently serves as president of Scheduled Castes Department, All India Congress Committee.

He was the President of Delhi Pradesh Youth Congress from 2001 to 2006. He held the post of Secretary in All India Congress Committee and in-charge of Bihar. He was recently appointed the Working President of Delhi Pradesh Congress Committee.

== Personal life and education ==
He was born in a humble Hindu family in the year 1969 in Delhi. He completed his graduation from Hansraj College, Delhi University and post graduation in Disaster Mitigation from Sikkim Manipal University.

== Political career ==
=== 2020 Delhi Legislative Assembly election ===
Rajesh Lilothia contested from the Mangol Puri constituency as a Congress party candidate for 2020 Delhi Legislative Assembly election. But he lost the contest. Rakhi Birla won as AAP candidate.

=== 2019 Indian general elections ===
He contested 2019 Indian general election as a candidate of Indian National Congress from North West Delhi Lok Sabha constituency. But he lost the contest.

=== 2015 Delhi Legislative Assembly election ===
He lost the election in 2015 from Patel Nagar constituency. Hazari Lal Chauhan won this seat as AAP candidate.

=== 2013 Delhi Legislative Assembly election ===
Rajesh Lilothia lost the election. AAP candidate Veena Anand gained this seat.

=== 2008 Delhi Legislative Assembly election ===
Rajesh Lilothia won and INC held Patel Nagar seat.
