= Dev Nagar, Delhi =

Residential area in Karol Bagh, Delhi, India

Dev Nagar
- Neighborhood
- Interactive map of Dev Nagar
- Location within Delhi Location within India
- Coordinates: 28.6552514°N 77.1861742°E
- Country: India
- Union Territory: Delhi
- District: Central Delhi
- Locality: Karol Bagh
- Elevation: 231 m (758 ft)

Population
  - Estimate: 80,000
- Time zone: GMT+5300
- Pincode: 110005

Dev Nagar is a residential colony in Karol Bagh, Central Delhi district, Delhi, India. Dev means "Gods and Goddesses" and Nagar means "City" in various indian languages. The population is over 80,000 and literacy is estimated at 90%. Many residents of Karol Bagh live here. There are many galis situated here. Delhi Sarai Rohilla and Vivekanand Puri Halt Railway stations provide connectivity for residents. It is well connected by bus.
