= Rajendra Place =

Commercial complex in New Delhi, India

Coordinates: 28.642°N 77.178°E

Rajendra Place is a multi stored, multi-building commercial complex, located at the main Pusa Road, Central Delhi, India. It is surrounded by the by Rajendra Nagar and Karol Bagh on southern side and northern & eastern side and by Patel Nagar on western side. The complex hosts several restaurants and offices, and is adjacent to the Jaypee Sidharth Hotel.

== Transportation ==
Rajendra place is connected to the Delhi Metro Rail System via the nearby Rajendra Place metro station on the Blue Line. Imly restaurant, famous for its train shaped form, is a nearby landmark.
