= Pravesh Ratn =

Indian politician

Member of the Delhi Legislative Assembly

Pravesh Ratn (born 1984) is an Indian politician from Delhi. He is a member of the Delhi Legislative Assembly from Patel Nagar Assembly constituency, which is reserved for Scheduled Castes, in New Delhi district. He won the 2025 Delhi Legislative Assembly election representing the Aam Aadmi Party.

== Early life and education ==
Ratn is from Patel Nagar, New Delhi district. He is the son of Ramesh Chandra Ratn. He studied Class 12 and passed the examinations conducted by NIOS, New Delhi in 2002. He is a businessman and his wife runs a fitness centre.

== Career ==
Ratn won from Patel Nagar Assembly constituency representing the Aam Aadmi Party in the 2025 Delhi Legislative Assembly election. He polled 57,512 votes and defeated his nearest rival, Raaj Kumar Anand of the Bharatiya Janata Party, by 4,049 votes. He lost the 2020 Delhi Legislative Assembly election on a BJP ticket to Raaj Kumar Anand of AAP. In December 2024, he joined the Aam Aadmi Party after being with the BJP for over a decade.
