= Rajni Kumar =

Indian educationist (1923–2022)

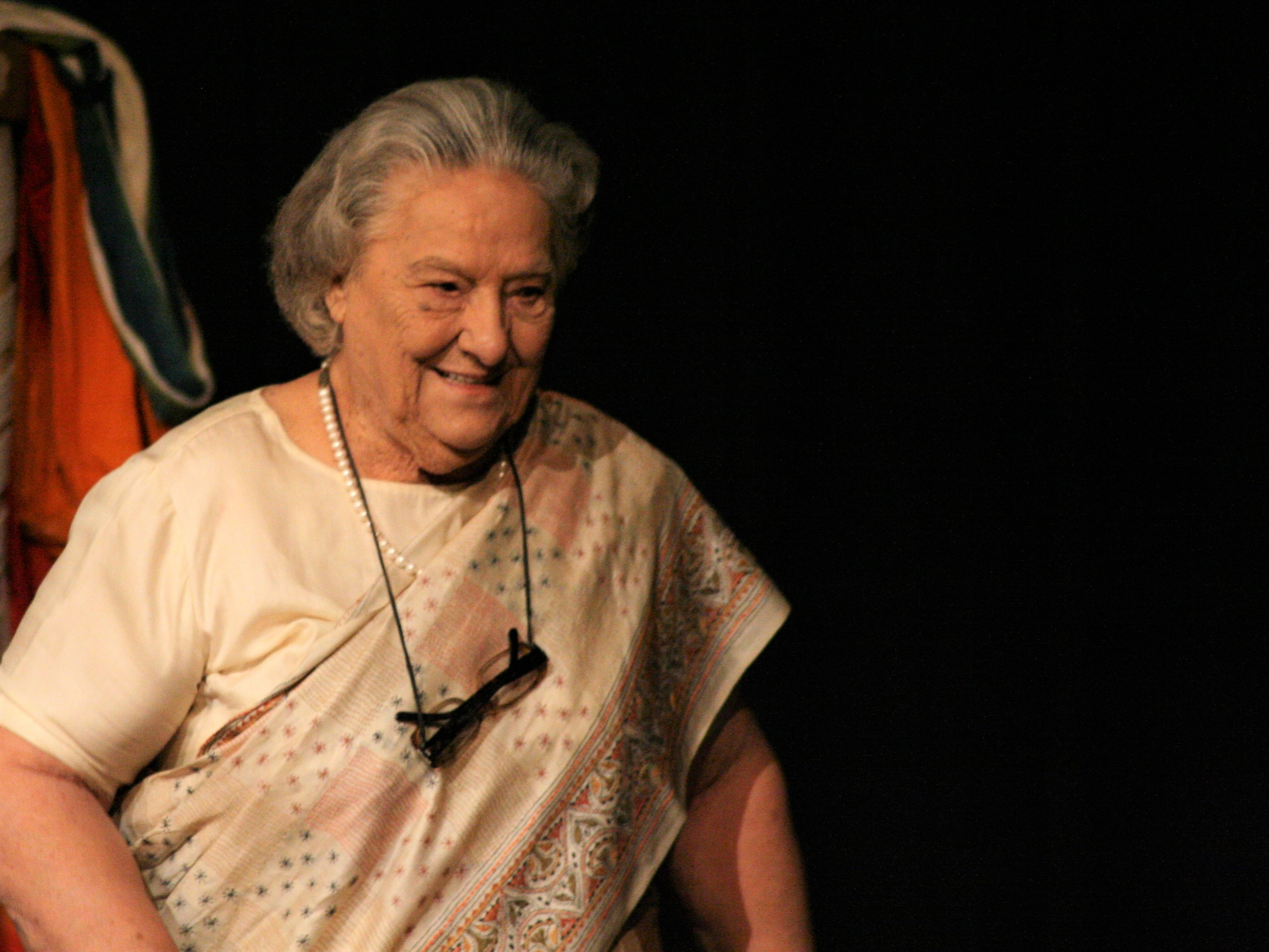
- Kumar as a guest of honor in 2012
- Born: Nancie Joyce Margaret Jones; 5 March 1923; London, England
- Died: 11 November 2022 (aged 99)
- Resting place: Lodhi Garden Crematory
- Occupation: Educationist
- Spouse: Yudishter Kumar
- Awards: Padma Shri; Gr8! Women Award
- Website: Official website

Rajni Kumar (born Nancie Joyce Margaret Jones; 5 March 1923 – 11 November 2022) was a British-born Indian educationist and the founder of Springdales Group of Schools. She was the recipient of the Padma Shri, the Government of India's fourth highest civilian award, in 2011.

== Biography ==
Kumar was born Nancie Joyce Margaret Jones on 5 March 1923 in London, United Kingdom. She graduated from the London School of Economics in 1941, married a fellow student, Yudhishter Kumar, at the age of 23, moved to India and took up the Indian name Rajni.

In 1950, she joined a local school, Salwan Girls School, as its Principal and worked there until 1955. During this period, she joined the National Federation of Indian Women in 1953 as one of its founding members. In 1955, Kumar started her own school, Springdales School, as a kindergarten in the living room of her house. The institution has, over the years, grown to four schools in India and one in Dubai and is reported to have over 6000 students in its rolls.

Kumar was the chairperson of the Lady Irwin College and vice president of National Bal Bhavan. She took part in the Global Peace Conferences in Geneva and the World Congress for the Rights of Children in Moscow. After her retirement in 1988, Kumar was involved with the Springdales Education Society as its chairperson. She was also associated with the Delhi Schools Literacy Project, an initiative under the National Literacy Mission.

Kumar was felicitated by the Government of South Africa on the International Women's Day in 2005. A recipient of the Gr8! Women Award, Kumar was honoured by the Government of India in 2011 with the fourth highest Indian civilian award of Padma Shri. In 2012, she was awarded the Order of the Companions of O. R. Tambo (Silver) by the Government of South Africa.

Kumar died on 10 November 2022, at the age of 99.

== Published works ==
- Kumar, Rajni (2019). Against the wind : a life's journey. Noida, Uttar Pradesh, India. ISBN 978-93-5357-132-0. OCLC 1130900621.

== See also ==
- Springdales School
- Lady Irwin College
