= Ramakrishna Ashram Marg metro station =

Metro station in Delhi, India

R.K. Ashram Marg

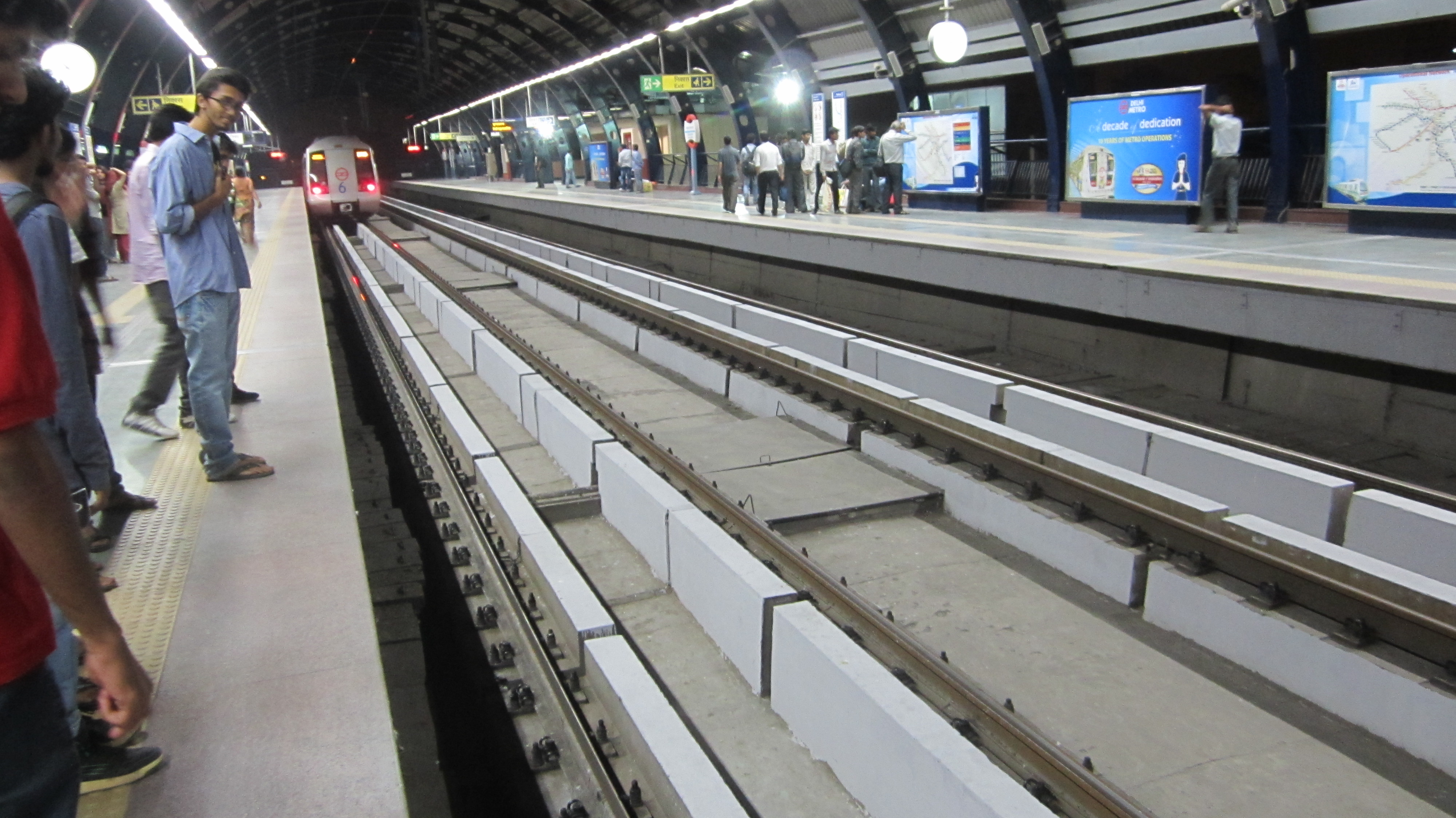

General information
- Coordinates: 28°38′21″N 77°12′31″E
- System: Delhi Metro station
- Owner: Delhi Metro
- Line: Blue Line Magenta Line
- Platforms: Side platform; Platform-1 → Noida Electronic City / Vaishali; Platform-2 → Dwarka Sector 21
- Tracks: 2

Construction
- Structure type: Elevated
- Platform levels: 2
- Parking: Available
- Accessible: Yes

Other information
- Station code: RKAM

History
- Opened: 31 December 2005; 20 years ago
- Electrified: 25 kV 50 Hz AC through overhead catenary

Passengers
- Jan 2015: 30,860/day 956,646/ Month average

Services
Preceding station	Delhi Metro	Following station
Jhandewalan towards Dwarka Sector 21	Blue Line	Rajiv Chowk towards Noida Electronic City or Vaishali
Future service
Shivaji Stadium towards Inderlok	Magenta Line	Nabi Karim towards Botanical Garden
Route map
Location

The Ramakrishna (R.K.) Ashram Marg metro station is located on the Blue Line of the Delhi Metro.

== Station layout ==
L2	Side platform | Doors will open on the left
L2	Platform 1 Eastbound	Towards → Noida Electronic City / Vaishali; Next Station: Rajiv Chowk Change at the next station for Yellow Line
L2	Platform 2 Westbound	Towards ← Dwarka Sector 21; Next Station: Jhandewalan
L2	Side platform | Doors will open on the left
L1	Concourse	Fare control, station agent, Metro Card vending machines, crossover
G	Street Level	Exit/Entrance

== Facilities ==
From this station, E-rickshaws are available for New Delhi railway station. ATMs, other commercial spaces are also available at the concourse and ground level.

== Connections ==
After Phase 4, this station will be an interchange point of the blue and magenta lines, along with Janakpuri West and Botanical Garden stations.

== See also ==
- List of Delhi Metro stations
- Transport in Delhi
- Delhi Metro Rail Corporation
- Delhi Suburban Railway
- List of rapid transit systems in India
