= Jhandewalan metro station =

Metro station in Delhi, India

Jhandewalan

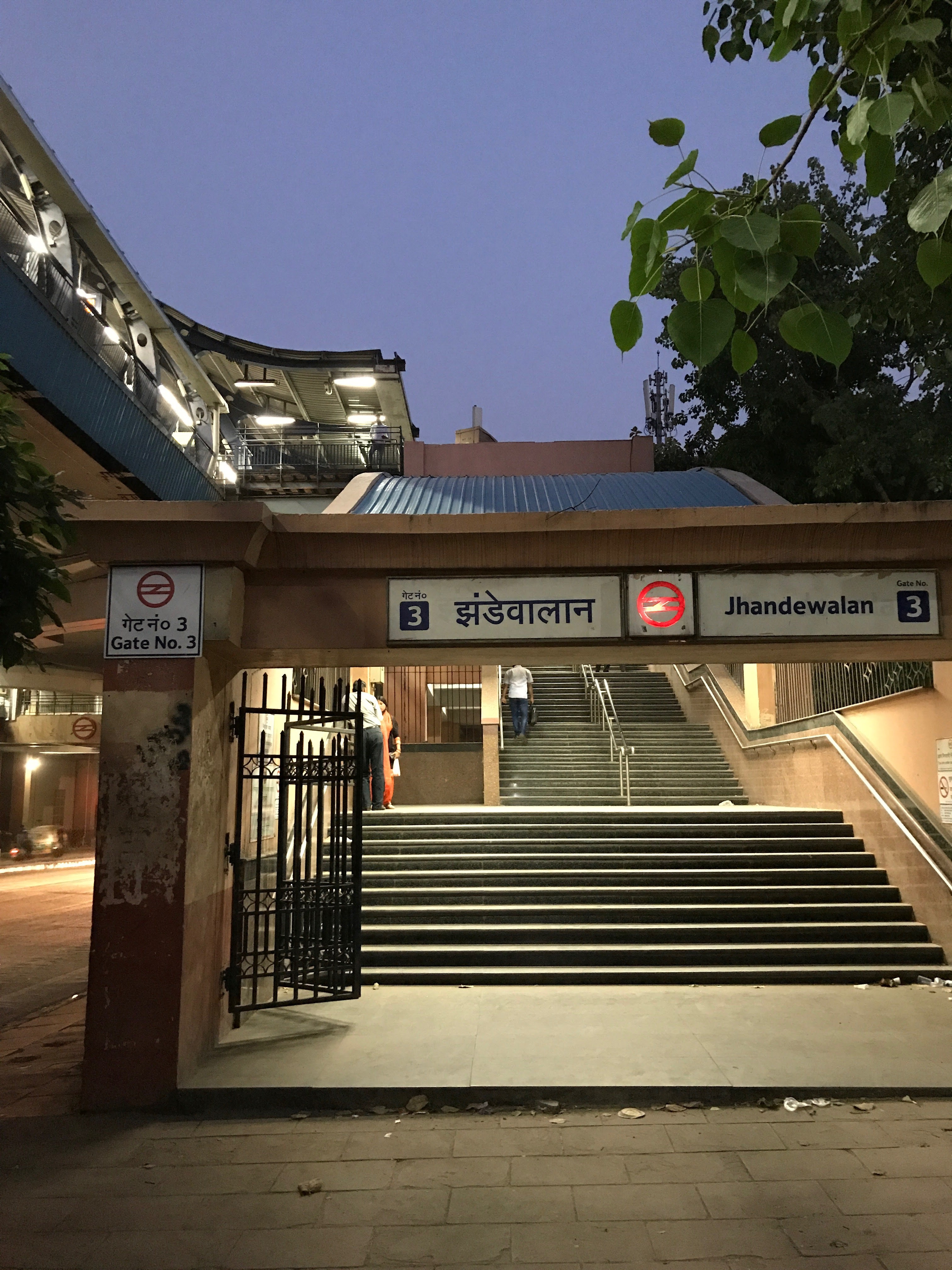

General information
- Coordinates: 28°38′40″N 77°11′59″E
- System: Delhi Metro station
- Owner: Delhi Metro
- Line: Blue Line
- Platforms: Side platform; Platform-1 → Noida Electronic City / Vaishali; Platform-2 → Dwarka Sector 21
- Tracks: 2

Construction
- Structure type: Elevated
- Platform levels: 2
- Accessible: Yes

Other information
- Station code: JW

History
- Opened: 31 December 2005; 20 years ago
- Electrified: 25 kV 50 Hz AC through overhead catenary

Services
Preceding station	Delhi Metro	Following station
Karol Bagh towards Dwarka Sector 21	Blue Line	Ramakrishna Ashram Marg towards Noida Electronic City or Vaishali
Route map
Location

The Jhandewalan metro station is located on the Blue Line of the Delhi Metro.

== Station layout ==
L2	Side platform | Doors will open on the left
L2	Platform 1 Eastbound	Towards → Noida Electronic City / Vaishali; Next Station: Ramakrishna Ashram Marg
L2	Platform 2 Westbound	Towards ← Dwarka Sector 21; Next Station: Karol Bagh
L2	Side platform | Doors will open on the left
L1	Concourse	Fare control, station agent, Metro Card vending machines, crossover
G	Street level	Exit/Entrance

== See also ==
- List of Delhi Metro stations
- Transport in Delhi
