= Springdales School =

The Springdales Schools
- The Springdales Schools Logo
- New Delhi28°38′37″N 77°11′46″W, Delhi; India

Information
- Type: Private school
- Motto: Vasudhaiva Kutumbakam
- Established: 1955
- Founder: Dr Rajni Kumar
- Grades: Nursery–12
- Affiliation: CBSE
- Website: springdales.com

The Springdales Schools are a group of English-language, co-educational schools run by the Springdales Education Society in New Delhi, India. There are five branches of the school: Pusa Road, Dhaula Kuan, Jaipur, Kirti Nagar, and Dubai. They have produced a long list of alumni in the field of arts, business, science, military and civil service. The school completed their Golden Jubilee in the year 2005. The schools are affiliated to the Central Board of Secondary Education (CBSE).The Pusa Road branch was inaugurated by former Indian president Dr Zakir Husain. The school motto, 'Vasudhaiva Kutumbakam', is a Sanskrit phrase which roughly translates to 'The world is a family'.

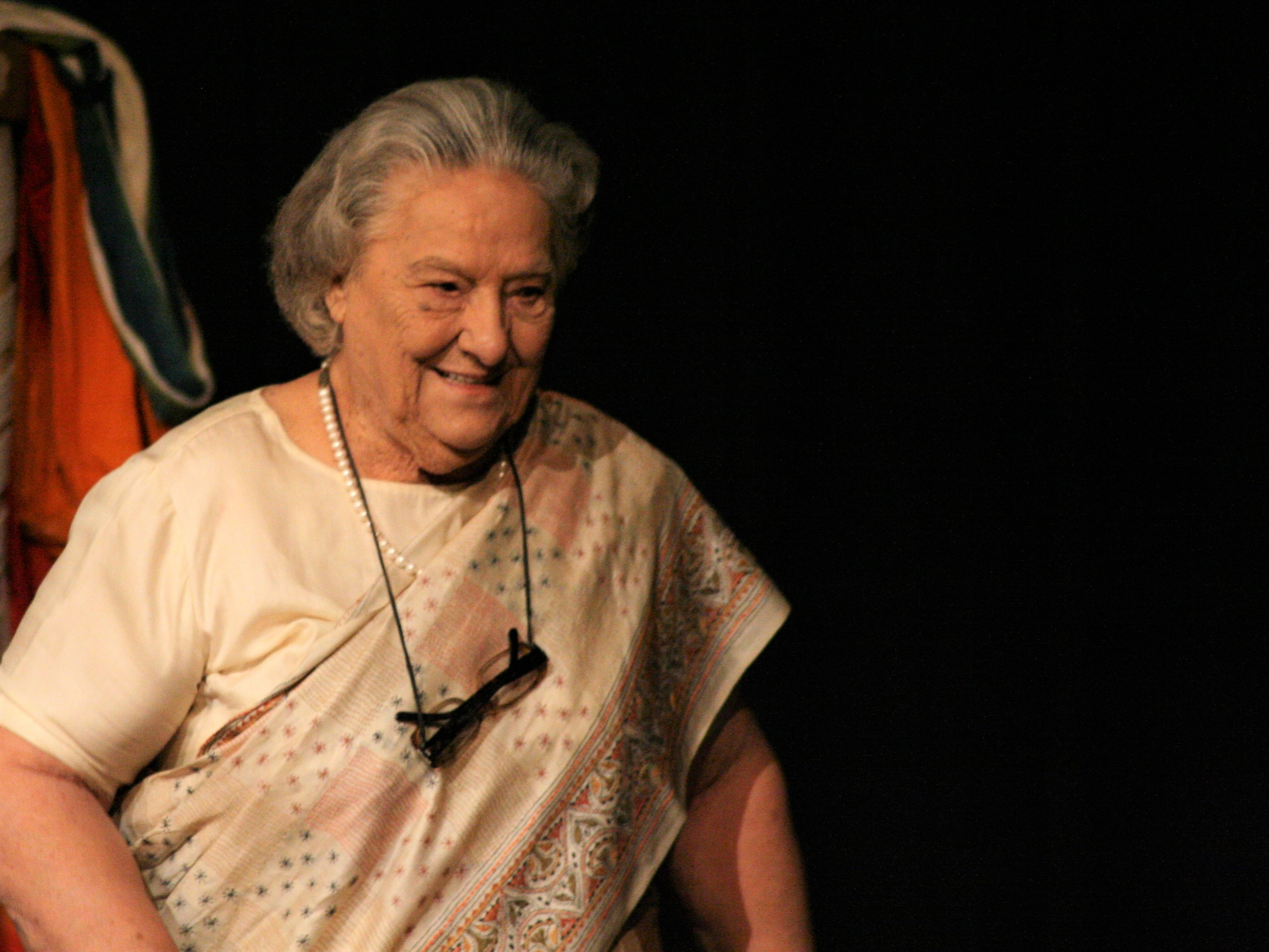
Rajni Kumar founder Springdales schools

== History ==
The first branch of the school was founded by Dr. Rajni Kumar and her husband Yudister Kumar in East Patel Nagar, New Delhi on 1 September 1955. Dr Rajni Kumar was a recipient of the Padma Shri while Yudister Kumar was a Barrister at Law and Senior Advocate of the Supreme Court of India. Subsequently, Springdales School Pusa Road and Kirti Nagar (in 1963 and 1966 respectively) were established.

Springdales was founded at ½ East Patel Nagar, Delhi.

In 1959 the school obtained recognition from the Educational Authorities of the state.

Later the Dhaula Kuan branch opened in 1984. In 2007 another branch was opened at Sushant City, Jaipur.

== Community service ==
Reaching out to all members of society, sharing their concerns and caring for them is an essential part of the Springdalian Education.

The National Association for Blind and SOS Children's Village on a regular basis to interact with the children and help them to themselves. Work in slums, sponsored walks for various causes, blood donation camps and fund raising for natural calamities are some of the other programmes the active social work department organizes.

The Special needs Centre at Springdales School, Dhaula Kuan "Saath-Saath", headed by Ms. Sonali Bose and the Scholarship Scheme programme for the talented students of M.C.D. schools have successfully completed one year. "Kaamyab", an ongoing outreach programme of the school for the underprivileged community in the nearby JJ Cluster started in the Golden Jubilee year is also doing commendable work. Children are taught basic learning skills as well as spoken English, Music and Dance, Computers, Art and Craft and Sports.

The school is a member of the Delhi School Literacy Project, and works to eradicate illiteracy and spread awareness amongst the economically and socially backward classes. At the annual award giving ceremony the efforts of participating schools are recognized. A literacy week is also celebrated during which competitions are held and a grand Literacy Mela organized. The community service programme of the school aims to foster social awareness among students.

== Partnerships ==
The school of Pusa Road and Dhaula Kuan have partnerships across the globe, including schools from Australia, Great Britain, South Africa, South Korea, Japan, and Germany. It has exchanges of staff and students. Language labs have been made in both the branches also.

== Foreign branches ==
A new branch was opened in 2013 at Sheikh Zayed Road in Dubai.
