= Veena Anand =

Indian politician

Member of the Delhi Legislative Assembly
- In office 8 December 2013 – 10 February 2015
- Preceded by: Rajesh Lilothia
- Succeeded by: Hazari Lal Chauhan

Personal details
- Party: Bharatiya Janata Party (10 July 2024–present)
- Other political affiliations: Aam Aadmi Party (2013–2024)
- Spouse: Raaj Kumar Anand (husband)

Veena Anand is an Indian politician and a former member of the Aam Aadmi Party. She was elected to the Delhi Legislative Assembly from Patel Nagar constituency in the December 2013 elections. She is married to Raaj Kumar Anand, another Indian politician.

Veena Anand joined BJP in the presence of national general secretary Arun Singh and Delhi BJP president Virendra Sachdeva at BJP Headquarters in New Delhi on 10 July 2024.
