= Dev Nagar =

Coordinates: 26°26′59.72″N 80°19′54.75″E

Dev Nagar is part of the old Kanpur area in the Indian state of Uttar Pradesh.
