= Dhaula Kuan =

Neighbourhood of Delhi, India

- Neighborhood of Delhi
- Location in Delhi, India
- Coordinates: 28.593°N 77.163°E
- Country: India
- State: Delhi
- District: South West Delhi

Government
  - Body: Municipal Corporation Of Delhi

Languages
  - Official: Hindi, English
- Time zone: UTC+5:30 (IST)
- PIN: 110021
- Civic agency: MCD

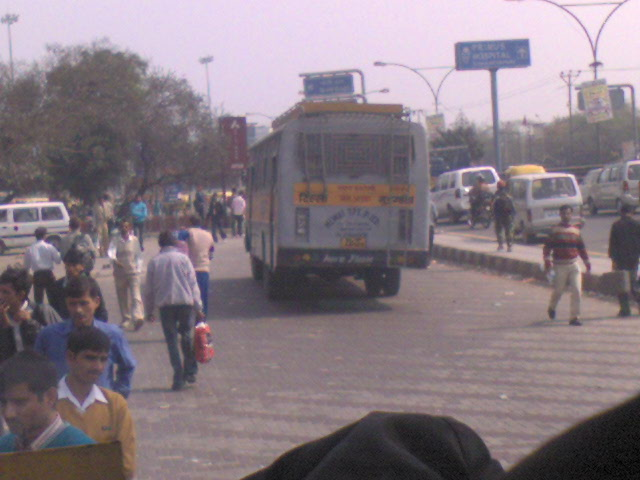
A Bus terminal at Dhaula Kuan, 2008.

Dhaula Kuan (Hindi: धौला कुआँ) is a major intersection of roads in Delhi, India. The name also now refers to the neighbourhood surrounding the intersection.

== Intersection ==
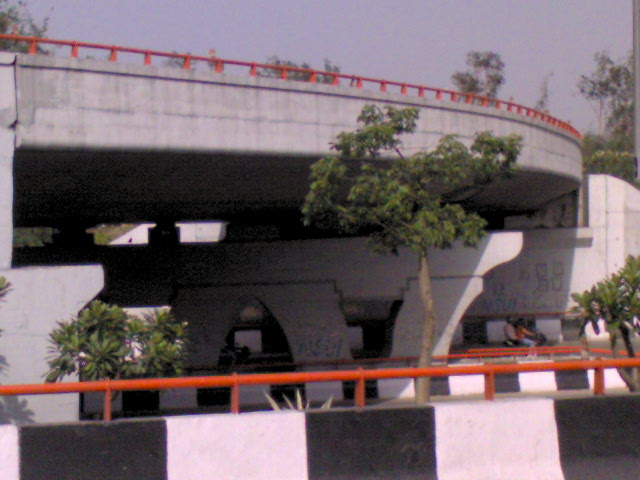
Dhaula Kuan fly-overs

Five major thoroughfares in Delhi meet at Dhaula Kuan. Passing through the intersection are the Ring Road and the starting point of National Highway 48, which feed traffic around Delhi and from Central Delhi to Gurgaon, and points south and southwest, respectively. National Highway 48 is also the primary route of traffic from Delhi to Delhi Airport. A major infrastructure project during the 1990s and early 2000s led to the construction of a figure-eight interchange that eliminated stop lights and improved traffic flow. In addition to being a major road hub, Dhaula Kuan is also a primary stop on the Delhi Ring Railway and is the location of a Delhi Metro stop on the Connaught Place - Airport line. Currently, Dhaula Kuan serves as a primary exchange point for multimodal travellers, and its importance is expected to grow as the Delhi Metro and Terminal 3 at Delhi Airport is constructed.

== History ==
The name Dhaula Kuan, means white well when translated to English from Hindi, (just as Dhaulagiri means white mountain), and refers to an ancient water well in the area that has white-colored sand.

It has been speculated that the well was constructed by Shah Alam II, the nominal Mughal emperor of India in the 1761-1806 CE period, whose actual area of control spanned a small territory in the environs of Delhi. Shah Alam II is said to have been fond of excursions across his limited domain, from the Red Fort to the Palam area, leading to the sarcastic verse, Sultanat-e-Shah-e-Alam, Az Dilli ta Palam (The dominion of Emperor Shah Alam, begins from Delhi and ends at Palam). Dhaula Kuan (the well) is located along this route in the Jheel Park complex (near Metro Station), and its masonry has been dated to the Shah Alam period.

== Neighbourhood ==
Dhaula Kuan sits between Chanakyapuri and the Delhi Cantonment; the former is an affluent neighbourhood that is home to a number of embassies and the latter houses a number of military personnel and their families.

Major institutions and points of interest in the neighbourhood include:

- The South Campus of the University of Delhi, including the Sri Venkateswara College and the Atma Ram Sanatan Dharma College.
- The Air Force School.
- Air Force Golden Jubilee Institute
- Manekshaw Centre
- The Army Public School Dhaula Kuan.
- The Air Force Auditorium.
- The Army Golf Course.
- Springdales School
- DSOI Delhi Cantt (Defence Services Officers Institute)
- 28 The Mall

== Delhi Metro ==
Dhaula Kuan Metro Station is located on the Delhi Airport Express Line (Orange Line) of the Delhi Metro. This station is the only elevated one along the Airport Express Line and features check-in facilities. This station was opened to the public on 15 August 2011. This station also connects the Airport Express Line with the Durgabai Deshmukh South Campus metro station of Pink Line of Delhi Metro.
