= Karol Bagh metro station =

Metro station in Delhi, India

Karol Bagh

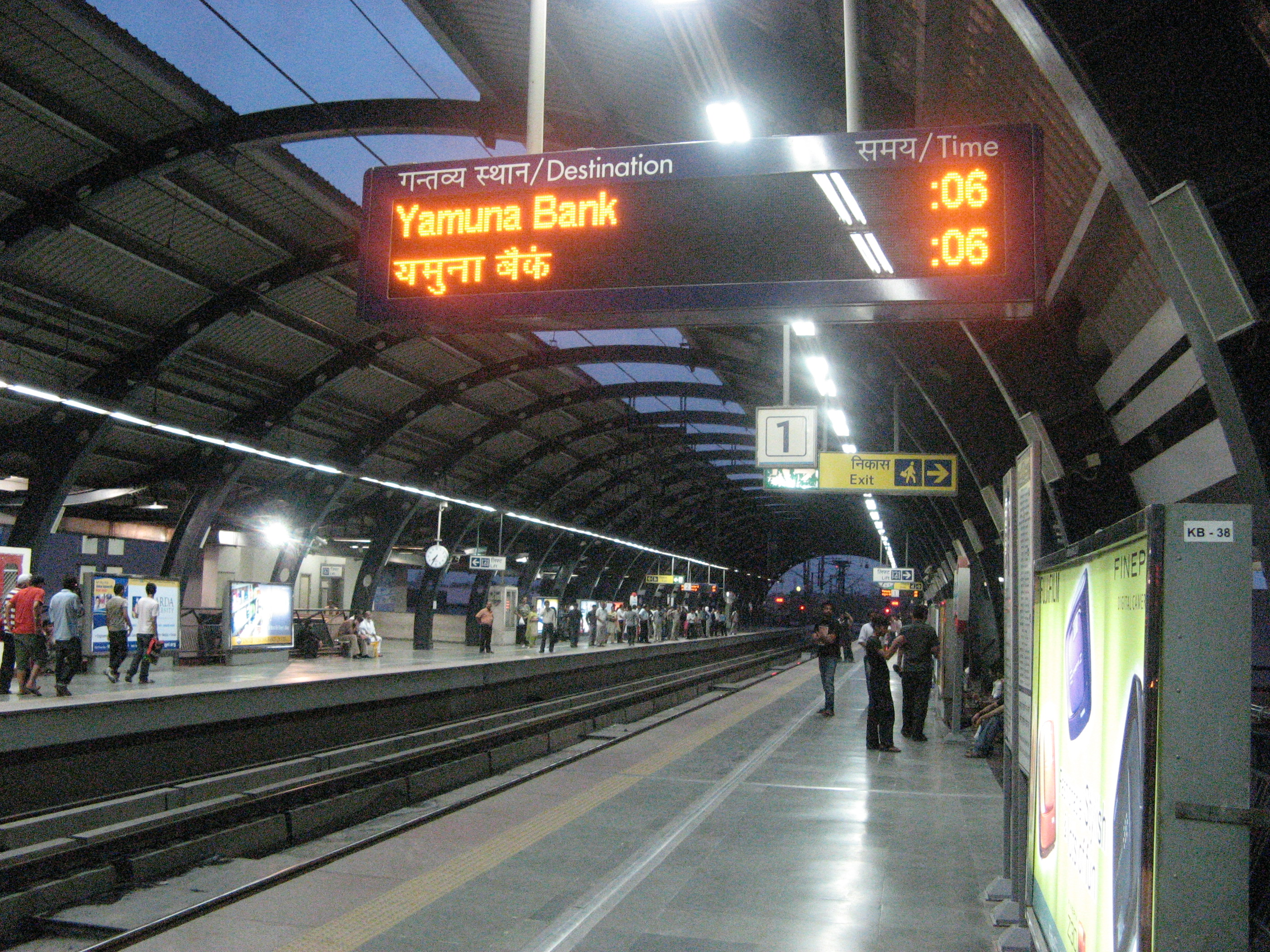

General information
- Coordinates: 28°38′38″N 77°11′19″E
- System: Delhi Metro station
- Owner: Delhi Metro
- Line: Blue Line
- Platforms: Side platform; Platform-1 → Noida Electronic City / Vaishali; Platform-2 → Dwarka Sector 21
- Tracks: 2

Construction
- Structure type: Elevated
- Platform levels: 2
- Accessible: Yes

Other information
- Station code: KB

History
- Opened: 31 December 2005; 20 years ago
- Electrified: 25 kV 50 Hz AC through overhead catenary

Services
| Preceding station | Delhi Metro | Following station |
|---|---|---|
| Rajendra Place towards Dwarka Sector 21 | Blue Line | Jhandewalan towards Noida Electronic City or Vaishali |
Route map
Location

Karol Bagh Metro station, also known as Qarol Bagh metro station, is a metro station located on the Blue Line of the Delhi Metro. Karol Bagh is a residential and commercial area located at Delhi. This metro station of Delhi Metro was inaugurated in year 2005. Its adjacent metro stations on the Blue Line are Jhandewalan and Rajendra Place.

The name comes under the new co-branding initiative by Delhi Metro Rail Corporation, under which brands can add their name, in this case the IAS Institute, to the metro stations in Delhi along with some advertising space provided to them at the metro stations.

== Station layout ==
| L2 | Side platform | Doors will open on the left |
| L2 | Platform 1 Eastbound | Towards → Noida Electronic City / Vaishali; Next Station: Jhandewalan |
| L2 | Platform 2 Westbound | Towards ← Dwarka Sector 21; Next Station: Rajendra Place |
| L2 | Side platform | Doors will open on the left |
| L1 | Concourse | Fare control, station agent, Metro Card vending machines, crossover |
| G | Street level | Exit/Entrance |

== See also ==
- List of Delhi Metro stations
- Transport in Delhi
