= Krishna Tirath =

Indian politician

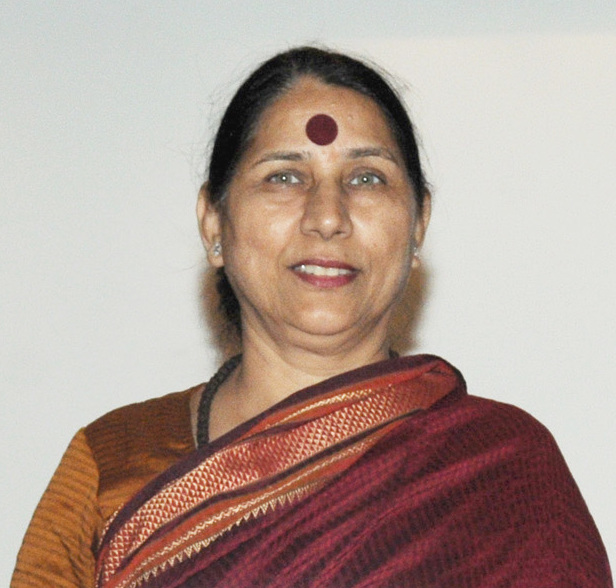
- Tirath in 2012

Minister of State (Independent Charge) for Women and Child Development
- In office May 31, 2009 – May 26, 2014
- Prime Minister: Manmohan Singh
- Preceded by: Renuka Chowdhury
- Succeeded by: Maneka Gandhi

Personal details
- Born: 3 March 1955 (age 71) New Delhi, India
- Party: Indian National Congress (2019-present) (before 2015)
- Other political affiliations: Bharatiya Janata Party (2015–2019)
- Spouse: Vijay Kumar
- Children: 3

Krishna Tirath (born 3 March 1955) is an Indian politician from INC. She was a member of the 15th Lok Sabha of India representing the North West Delhi constituency of Delhi. She was Minister of State (Independent Charge) in Ministry of Women and Child Development in the second Manmohan Singh ministry. She left the Indian National Congress (INC), and on 19 January 2015 she joined Bharatiya Janata Party (BJP). In March 2019, she rejoined the INC.

She began her political career as an MLA in Delhi and was a member of the Delhi Legislative Assembly between 1984 and 2004. In 1998, she became the Minister for Social Welfare, SC & ST and Labour & Employment in the Sheila Dikshit-led Delhi government. The Chief Minister saw her as a part of the dissident group and forced to resign from her post by dissolving her entire Cabinet. On her resignation in 2003, she became Deputy Speaker of the Delhi Assembly.

In the 2004 elections she beat Anita Arya of the Bharatiya Janata Party (BJP) and was elected to parliament. In 2009 elections, she was again elected from North West Delhi by defeating Meera Kanwaria of BJP.

== Minister of Women and Child Development ==
As Minister for Women and Child Development, Tirath stated that the government's priorities would be to "support holistic empowerment of women, ensure adequate and universal availability of supplementary nutrition for children, adolescent girls and expectant mothers and build a protective environment for children where they can develop and flourish as responsible and happy citizens of the society."

Tirath has proposed that working Indian husbands pay a portion of their income to their wives. The goal is to calculate the value of housework, and to socially empower women for the work they do at home.

In a 2012 meeting with United States Secretary of Health and Human Services Kathleen Sebelius, Tirath stated her concern for malnutrition among children in India. She emphasized the importance of agencies like Integrated Child Development Services for implementing improvements in education, immunization and supplementary nutrition, to alleviate child mortality.

== National Girl Child Day photograph ==
On 24 January 2010 a photograph of former Pakistan Air Chief Marshal Tanvir Mahmood Ahmed in uniform appeared along with those of Prime Minister Manmohan Singh and Congress president Sonia Gandhi in a full-page newspaper advertisement (see External links below) given by Ministry of Women and Child Development to mark the National Girl Child Day. Initially Mrs.Tirath refused to accept the error on behalf of her ministry, accused the media of hair-splitting, and stated, "[the] message is more important than the image. The photograph is only symbolic. The message for the girl child is more important. She should be protected." She later apologised on behalf of her ministry for publishing a photograph of a former Pakistan Air Force chief in a government advertisement and said an inquiry will bring out who was responsible for it. The former air marshal, upon learning of the publication, "..wasn't aware about this [and felt it was] an innocent mistake."

== Joining BJP ==
On 19 January 2015, she formally joined the BJP after meeting Mr Amit Shah - the BJP President. She contested from Patel Nagar (Delhi Assembly constituency) as a BJP candidate for the 2015 Delhi Legislative Assembly election and was defeated by Hazari Lal Chauhan of AAP by a margin of 34,638 votes. She left the Bharatiya Janata Party in March 2019 and rejoined Indian National Congress.
