= Shadipur metro station =

Metro station in Delhi, India

Shadipur

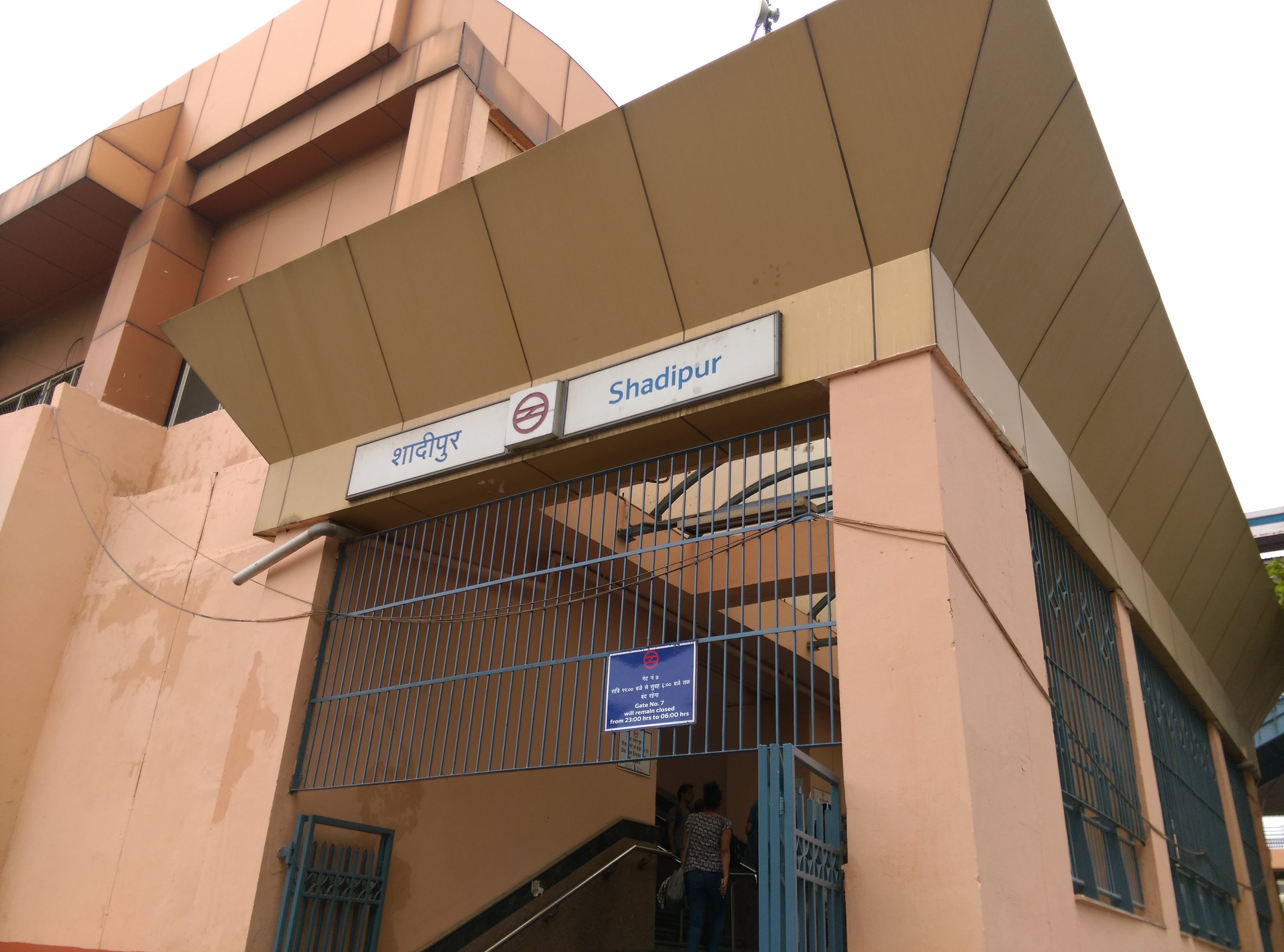

General information
- Location: Main Patel Rd, DTC Colony, Shadipur, New Delhi 110008
- Coordinates: 28°39′06″N 77°09′30″E
- System: Delhi Metro station
- Owner: Delhi Metro
- Operator: Delhi Metro Rail Corporation (DMRC)
- Line: Blue Line
- Platforms: Side platform; Platform-1 → Noida Electronic City / Vaishali; Platform-2 → Dwarka Sector 21
- Tracks: 2

Construction
- Structure type: Elevated, Double-track
- Platform levels: 2
- Parking: Available
- Accessible: Yes

Other information
- Status: Staffed, Operational
- Station code: SP

History
- Opened: 31 December 2005; 20 years ago
- Electrified: 25 kV 50 Hz AC through overhead catenary

Passengers
- Jan 2015: 32,042/day 993,302/ Month average

Services
Preceding station	Delhi Metro	Following station
Kirti Nagar towards Dwarka Sector 21	Blue Line	Patel Nagar towards Noida Electronic City or Vaishali
Route map
Location

The Shadipur or Patel Nagar (West) metro station is located on the Blue Line of the Delhi Metro, situated in the Shadipur area.

== The station ==
=== Station layout ===
L2	Side platform | Doors will open on the left
L2	Platform 1 Eastbound	Towards → Noida Electronic City / Vaishali; Next Station: Patel Nagar
L2	Platform 2 Westbound	Towards ← Dwarka Sector 21; Next Station: Kirti Nagar Change at the next station for Green Line
L2	Side platform | Doors will open on the left
L1	Concourse	Fare control, station agent, Metro Card vending machines, crossover
G	Street Level	Exit/Entrance

=== Facilities ===
List of available ATM at Shadipur metro station are Oriental Bank of Commerce, Bank of Baroda, Canara Bank, IndusInd Bank

== Entry/Exit ==
Shadipur metro station Entry/exits
Gate No-1	Gate No-2	Gate No-3	Gate No-4	Gate No-5	Gate No-6	Gate No-7
Towards DMS Depot & DTC Bus Depot	Baljeet Nagar	Patel Nagar Police Station	Patel Nagar	Ranjeet Nagar	Pandav Nagar	Towards Parking

== Connections ==
=== Bus ===
Delhi Transport Corporation bus routes number 47A, 47ACL, 73, 85, 85EXT, 85Ext, 114+990, 114+990E, 160, 208, 218, 308,313, 408, 408CL, 408EXTCL, 410, 410CL, 521, 522A, 751, 753, 775A, 803, 803CL, 807A, 810, 838, 842, 857, 871, 871A, 894, 894CL, 910, 910A, 940, 943, 944, 944EXTSPL, 953, 962, 962A, 970, 970A, 970B, 970C, 975, 980, 985, 990, 990A, 990CL, 990ECL, 990EXT, 991, 997, New Delhi Railway Station Gate 2 - Bahadurgarh Bus Stand serves the station from outside metro station stop.

== See also ==
- Delhi
- List of Delhi Metro stations
- Transport in Delhi
- Delhi Metro Rail Corporation
- Delhi Suburban Railway
- Delhi Monorail
- Delhi Transport Corporation
- Central Delhi
- New Delhi
- National Capital Region (India)
- List of rapid transit systems
- List of metro systems
