= Patel Nagar Assembly constituency =

Constituency of the Delhi legislative assembly in India

Coordinates: 28.654°N 77.168°E

Patel Nagar
- Constituency No. 24 for the Delhi Legislative Assembly

Constituency details
- Country: India
- Region: North India
- State: Delhi
- District: New Delhi
- Lok Sabha constituency: New Delhi
- Reservation: SC

Member of Legislative Assembly
- 8th Delhi Legislative Assembly
- Incumbent Pravesh Ratn
- Party: Aam Aadmi Party
- Elected year: 2025

Patel Nagar is one of the seventy constituencies in the Delhi Legislative Assembly located in northern India. It is part of the New Delhi Lok Sabha constituency.

== Members of the Legislative Assembly ==
Year	Member	Party
1993	Mewa Ram Arya	Bharatiya Janata Party
1998	Ramakant Goswami	Indian National Congress
2003	Ramakant Goswami	Indian National Congress
2008	Rajesh Lilothia	Indian National Congress
2013	Veena Anand	Aam Aadmi Party
2015	Hazari Lal Chauhan	Aam Aadmi Party
2020	Raaj Kumar Anand	Aam Aadmi Party
2025	Pravesh Ratn	Aam Aadmi Party

== Election results ==
=== 2025 ===
Delhi Assembly elections, 2025: Patel Nagar
Party	Candidate	Votes	%	±%
AAP	Pravesh Ratn	57,512		
BJP	Raaj Kumar Anand	53,463		
INC	Krishna Tirath	4654	3.96	
NOTA	None of the above	772		
Majority		4049		
Turnout		1,17,370		
AAP hold		Swing		

=== 2020 ===
Delhi Assembly elections, 2020: Patel Nagar
Party	Candidate	Votes	%	±%
AAP	Raaj Kumar Anand	73,463	60.81	+1.76
BJP	Pravesh Ratn	42,528	35.20	+5.85
INC	Krishna Tirath	3,382	2.80	−6.43
BSP	Pradeep Kumar Rawal	674	0.56	−0.10
NOTA	None of the above	767	0.63	+0.13
Majority		30,935	25.61	−4.09
Turnout		1,20,890	61.00	−7.13
AAP hold		Swing		

=== 2015 ===
Delhi Assembly elections, 2015: Patel Nagar
Party	Candidate	Votes	%	±%
AAP	Hazari Lal Chauhan	68,868	59.05	+21.14
BJP	Krishna Tirath	34,230	29.35	−2.46
INC	Rajesh Lilothia	10,766	9.23	−15.15
Independent	Veena Anand	1,051	0.90	
BSP	Alok Nanadan	772	0.66	−4.28
NOTA	None of the above	469	0.40	−0.57
Majority		34,638	29.70	+23.60
Turnout		1,16,645	68.13	
AAP hold		Swing	+21.14	

=== 2013 ===
Delhi Assembly elections, 2013: Patel Nagar
Party	Candidate	Votes	%	±%
AAP	Veena Anand	38,899	37.91	
BJP	Poornima Vidyarthi	32,637	31.81	−7.73
INC	Rajesh Lilothia	25,016	24.38	−26.05
BSP	Mangal Sain	5,069	4.94	−2.90
NOTA	None of the Above	993	0.97	
Majority		6,262	6.10	−4.79
Turnout		1,02,650	65.96	
AAP gain from INC		Swing		

=== 2008 ===
Delhi Assembly elections, 2008: Patel Nagar
Party	Candidate	Votes	%	±%
INC	Rajesh Lilothia	44,022	50.43	−9.61
BJP	Anita Arya	34,516	39.54	−5.43
BSP	Madan Lal	6,846	7.84	
Independent	Sunil Pawar	665	0.76	
DBP	Ghanshyam Morwal	487	0.56	
Independent	Dr Banarasi Dass	186	0.21	
Independent	Madan Lal	166	0.19	
Independent	Rita	130	0.15	
Independent	Puran Chand Gautam	97	0.11	
IJP	Dayanand	91	0.10	−0.72
Independent	Kiran Kumar	84	0.10	
Majority		9,506	10.89	−15.04
Turnout		87,290	56.5	+5.00
INC hold		Swing	-9.61	

=== 2003 ===
Delhi Assembly elections, 2003: Patel Nagar
Party	Candidate	Votes	%	±%
INC	Rama Kant Goswami	32,833	60.04	+12.66
BJP	Mahesh Chadha	18,657	34.11	−3.13
Independent	Asha	1,043	1.91	
Indian Federal Democratic Party	Brijesh Kumar Singh	860	1.57	
Independent	Sudesh Chug	535	0.98	
IJP	Chandu Lal	446	0.82	
Independent	Saleem	179	0.33	
Independent	Dinesh Kumar	136	0.25	
Majority		14,176	25.93	+15.79
Turnout		54,689	51.50	+1.18
INC hold		Swing	+12.66	

=== 1998 ===
Delhi Assembly elections, 1998: Patel Nagar
Party	Candidate	Votes	%	±%
INC	Rama Kant Goswami	26,135	47.38	+6.53
BJP	Mewa Ram Arya	20,541	37.24	−7.61
Independent	Dilvinder Singh	5,861	10.63	
BSP	Vinita	1,630	2.95	+0.92
Independent	Kiran Kapoor	370	0.67	
SJP(R)	Santosh Chawla	144	0.26	
RJD	Sandeep Saxena	138	0.25	
Independent	Om Prakash Trehan	101	0.18	
Independent	Chandu Lal	95	0.17	
Independent	Jai Bhagwan Gupta	57	0.10	
Independent	Suresh Kumar	55	0.10	
Independent	Dwarika Prasad	35	0.06	−0.15
Majority		5,594	10.06	+6.06
Turnout		55,162	50.32	−11.49
INC gain from BJP		Swing	-6.53	

=== 1993 ===
Delhi Assembly elections, 1993: Patel Nagar
Party	Candidate	Votes	%	±%
BJP	Mewa Ram Arya	24,058	44.85	
INC	Manohar Arora	21,911	40.85	
JD	Braham Prakash	3,717	6.93	
BSP	Mahender Pratap	1,090	2.03	
Independent	Mansa Ram	1,052	1.96	
Independent	Darshan Lal Arora	294	0.55	
Independent	Anil Chauhan	236	0.44	
Independent	Madan Lal	194	0.36	
Independent	Sardar Madan Singh	145	0.27	
Independent	Ram Nath Deepak	121	0.23	
Independent	Dwarka Prasad	115	0.21	
Independent	G S Jogi	103	0.19	
Independent	Pradeep Kumar	102	0.19	
Independent	Gulshan Anand	89	0.17	
Independent	Jai Kishan	85	0.16	
Independent	Shyam Lal	65	0.12	
Independent	Sunil Kumar	63	0.12	
Independent	Safaraj Ahamad	51	0.10	
Independent	Ghanshyam Banerjee	37	0.07	
Independent	Jitender Jeet	33	0.06	
Independent	Rajinder	27	0.05	
Independent	Veena Chhokar	23	0.04	
Independent	Mohinder Singh	21	0.04	
Independent	Mahesh	10	0.02	
Majority		2,147	4.00	
Turnout		53,642	61.81	
BJP hold		Swing		
