= Hazari Lal Chauhan =

Indian politician

MLA, Sixth Legislative Assembly of Delhi
- In office Feb. 2015 – Feb. 2020
- Preceded by: Veena Anand
- Succeeded by: Raaj Kumar Anand
- Constituency: Patel Nagar

Personal details
- Born: 10 May 1948 (age 78) Karol Bagh
- Party: Aam Aadmi Party
- Education: Govt. School, Dev Nagar
- Profession: Politician & businessperson

Hazari Lal Chauhan is an Indian politician and member of the Sixth Legislative Assembly of Delhi in India. He represents the Patel Nagar constituency of New Delhi and is a member of the Aam Aadmi Party political party.

== Early life and education ==
Hazari Lal Chauhan was born in Karol Bagh. He attended the Govt. School, Dev Nagar and is educated till Ninth grade.

== Political career ==
Hazari Lal Chauhan has been an MLA for one term from the Patel Nagar constituency as a representative of the Aam Aadmi Party. In 1983, Chauhan had contested the New Delhi Municipal Council elections.

== Posts held ==
#	From	To	Position	Comments
01	Feb. 2015	Feb. 2020	Member, Sixth Legislative Assembly of Delhi	

== See also ==
- Aam Aadmi Party
- Delhi Legislative Assembly
- Patel Nagar (Delhi Assembly constituency)
- Politics of India
- Sixth Legislative Assembly of Delhi
