= Patel Nagar metro station =

Metro station in Delhi, India

Patel Nagar

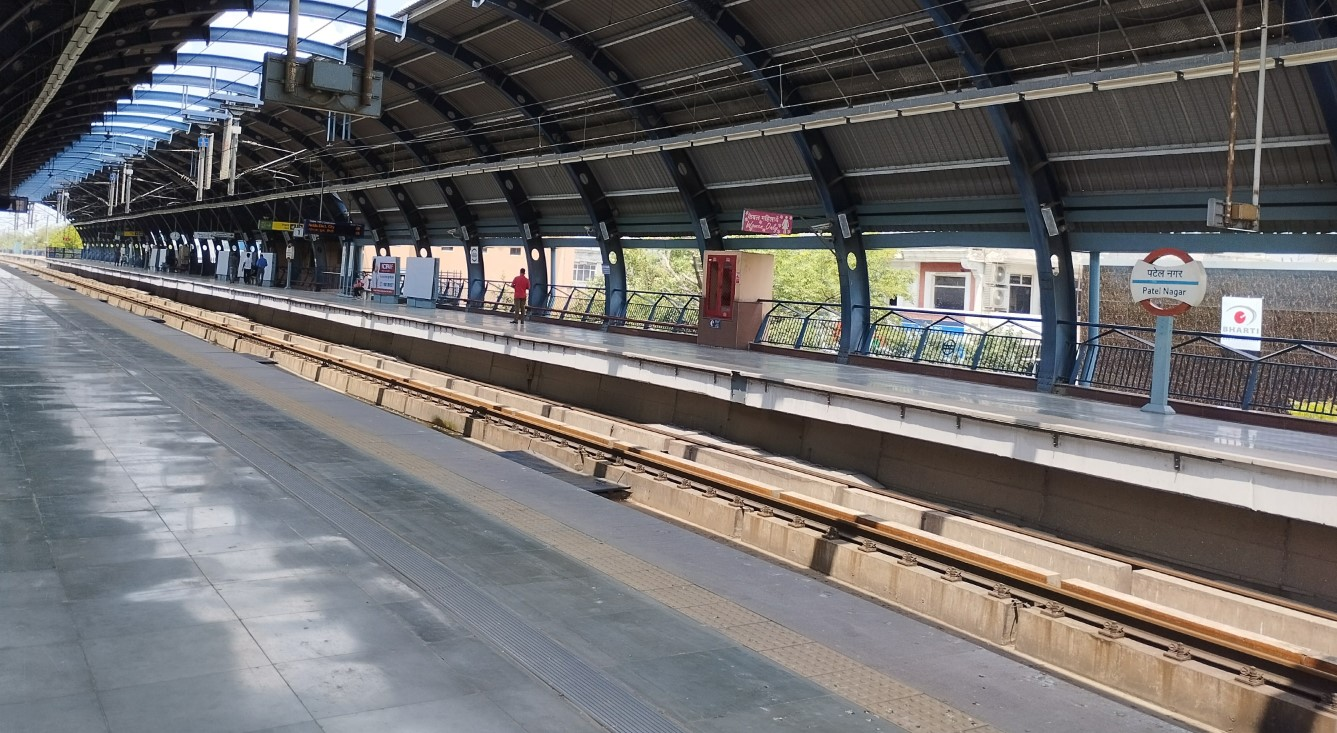

General information
- Location: West Patel Nagar, New Delhi, 110008
- Coordinates: 28°38′42″N 77°10′09″E
- System: Delhi Metro station
- Owner: Delhi Metro
- Operator: Delhi Metro Rail Corporation (DMRC)
- Line: Blue Line
- Platforms: Side platform; Platform-1 → Noida Electronic City / Vaishali; Platform-2 → Dwarka Sector 21
- Tracks: 2

Construction
- Structure type: Elevated, Double-track
- Platform levels: 2
- Parking: Available
- Accessible: Yes

Other information
- Status: Staffed, Operational
- Station code: PN

History
- Opened: 31 December 2005; 20 years ago
- Electrified: 25 kV 50 Hz AC through overhead catenary

Passengers
- Jan 2015: 13,817/day 428,321/ Month average

Services
Preceding station	Delhi Metro	Following station
Shadipur towards Dwarka Sector 21	Blue Line	Rajendra Place towards Noida Electronic City or Vaishali
Route map
Location

The Patel Nagar metro station is located on the Blue Line of the Delhi Metro. It connects to east, west, and south Patel Nagar with the rest of Delhi.

== The station ==
=== Station layout ===
L2	Side platform | Doors will open on the left
L2	Platform 1 Eastbound	Towards → Noida Electronic City / Vaishali; Next Station: Rajendra Place
L2	Platform 2 Westbound	Towards ← Dwarka Sector 21; Next Station: Shadipur
L2	Side platform | Doors will open on the left
L1	Concourse	Fare control, station agent, Metro Card vending machines, crossover
G	Street Level	Exit/Entrance

=== Facilities ===
List of available ATM at Patel Nagar metro station are Oriental Bank of Commerce, Karnataka Bank, Canara Bank, IndusInd Bank

== Entry/exit ==
Patel Nagar metro station Entry/exits
Gate No-1	Gate No-2	Gate No-3	Gate No-4

== Connections ==
=== Bus ===
Delhi Transport Corporation bus routes number 47A, 47ACL, 73, 85, 85EXT, 85Ext, 114+990, 114+990E, 160, 208, 218, 308,313, 408, 408CL, 408EXTCL, 410, 410CL, 521, 522A, 751, 753, 775A, 803, 803CL, 807A, 810, 838, 842, 857, 871, 871A, 894, 894CL, 910, 910A, 940, 943, 944, 944EXTSPL, 953, 962, 962A, 970, 970A, 970B, 970C, 975, 980, 985, 990, 990A, 990CL, 990ECL, 990EXT, 991, 997, New Delhi Railway Station Gate 2 - Bahadurgarh Bus Stand serves the station from outside metro station stop.

== See also ==
- Delhi
- Patel Nagar
- List of Delhi Metro stations
- Transport in Delhi
- Delhi Metro Rail Corporation
- Delhi Suburban Railway
- Delhi Monorail
- Delhi Transport Corporation
- Central Delhi
- New Delhi
- National Capital Region (India)
- List of rapid transit systems
- List of metro systems
