= Raaj Kumar Anand =

Indian politician

- राज कुमार आनंद
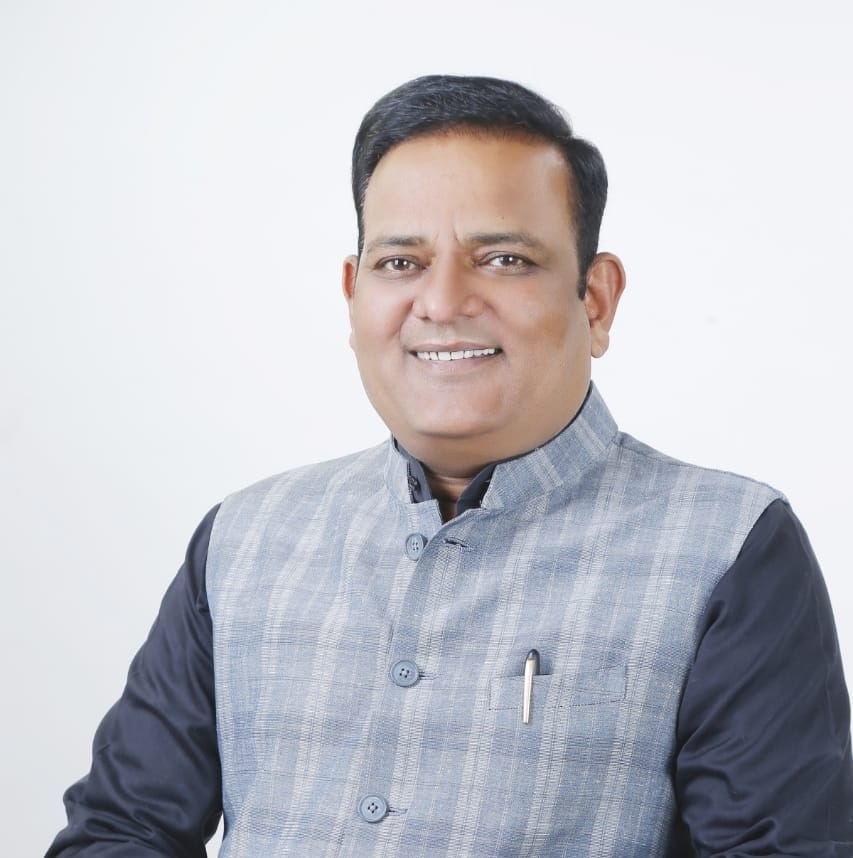

Cabinet Minister, Government of Delhi
- In office 3 November 2022 – 11 April 2024
- Lieutenant Governor: Vinai Kumar Saxena
- Cabinet: Kejriwal ministry – III
- Chief Minister: Arvind Kejriwal
- Ministry and Departments: List: * Social Welfare; Labour; Employment; SC & ST; Land & Building; Cooperative; Gurudwara Elections
- Preceded by: Rajendra Pal Gautam
- Succeeded by: Mukesh Kumar Ahlawat

Member of the Delhi Legislative Assembly
- In office 11 February 2020 – 11 April 2024
- Preceded by: Hazari Lal Chauhan
- Succeeded by: Pravesh Ratn
- Constituency: Patel Nagar

Personal details
- Born: 14 September 1966 (age 59)
- Party: Bharatiya Janata Party (10 July 2024–present)
- Other political affiliations: Bahujan Samaj Party (May 2024–July 2024); Aam Aadmi Party (2012–2024)
- Spouse: Veena Anand (wife)
- Education: Bundelkhand University

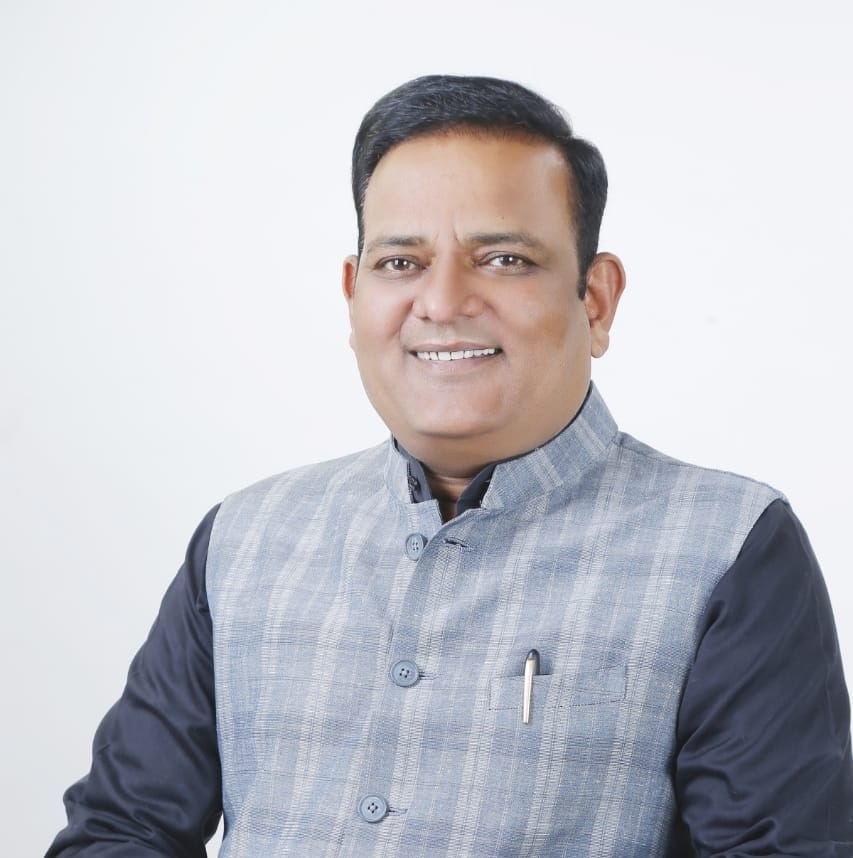
Portrait of Raaj Kumar Anand.

Raaj Kumar Anand is an Indian businessman and politician from the Bharatiya Janata Party. Anand previously served as the MLA from the Patel Nagar Assembly constituency and later became a member of the Delhi Cabinet. He unsuccessfully contested the 2025 Delhi Legislative Assembly election. Anand was the BJP's candidate for the 2025 Delhi Assembly elections from Patel Nagar Vidhan Sabha (SC) constituency.

== Early life and education ==
Anand was born on 14 September 1966. He holds a Master's degree in Political Science from Bundelkhand University.

== Political career ==
He began his political career with the Aam Aadmi Party. In 2011, Anand joined the Anna Hazare-led India Against Corruption Movement and became one of the early members of the AAP in 2012. He served as an MLA from Patel Nagar after winning the 2020 Delhi Assembly elections. He established the Anand Path Foundation, in which, he initiated several programs to uplift underprivileged communities, including the establishment of Dr. Ambedkar Pathshala in December 2018, for facilitating education of children in slum areas. During the COVID-19 pandemic, Anand set up a COVID care centre in Patel Nagar in May 2021. In November 2022, he was inducted into the Delhi Cabinet, where he was assigned under department of Social Welfare, SC & ST, in Gurudwara Elections, and the Registrar of Cooperative Societies. As the Delhi Cabinet Minister, Anand spearheaded the implementation of the Delhi Occupational Safety, Health and Working Conditions Rules, 2023, a move to enhance workplace safety and increase women's participation in the workforce. He also actively monitored governance initiatives, while inspecting the enforcement of the non-essential truck ban at Delhi's Singhu border to ensure compliance. He inaugurated the new pharmacy block at Sardar Vallabh Bhai Patel Hospital in April 2023. In April 2024, Anand resigned from AAP and the Delhi Cabinet, citing inadequate representation of Dalits within the party. He joined the Bharatiya Janata Party (BJP) in July 2024 and contested the 2024 Lok Sabha Elections from New Delhi.

== Electoral performance ==
=== 2025 ===
Delhi Assembly elections, 2025: Patel Nagar
Party	Candidate	Votes	%	±%
AAP	Pravesh Ratn	57,512		
BJP	Raaj Kumar Anand	53,463		
INC	Krishna Tirath	4654	3.96	
NOTA	None of the above	772		
Majority		4049		
Turnout		1,17,370		
AAP hold		Swing		

Delhi Assembly elections, 2020: Patel Nagar
Party	Candidate	Votes	%	±%
AAP	Raaj Kumar Anand	73,463	60.81	+1.76
BJP	Pravesh Ratn	42,528	35.20	+5.85
INC	Krishna Tirath	3,382	2.80	−6.43
BSP	Pradeep Kumar Rawal	674	0.56	−0.10
NOTA	None of the above	767	0.63	+0.13
Majority		30,935	25.61	−4.09
Turnout		1,20,890	61.00	−7.13
AAP hold		Swing		
