= Karol Bagh =

Karol Bagh Qarol Bagh
- Neighbourhood
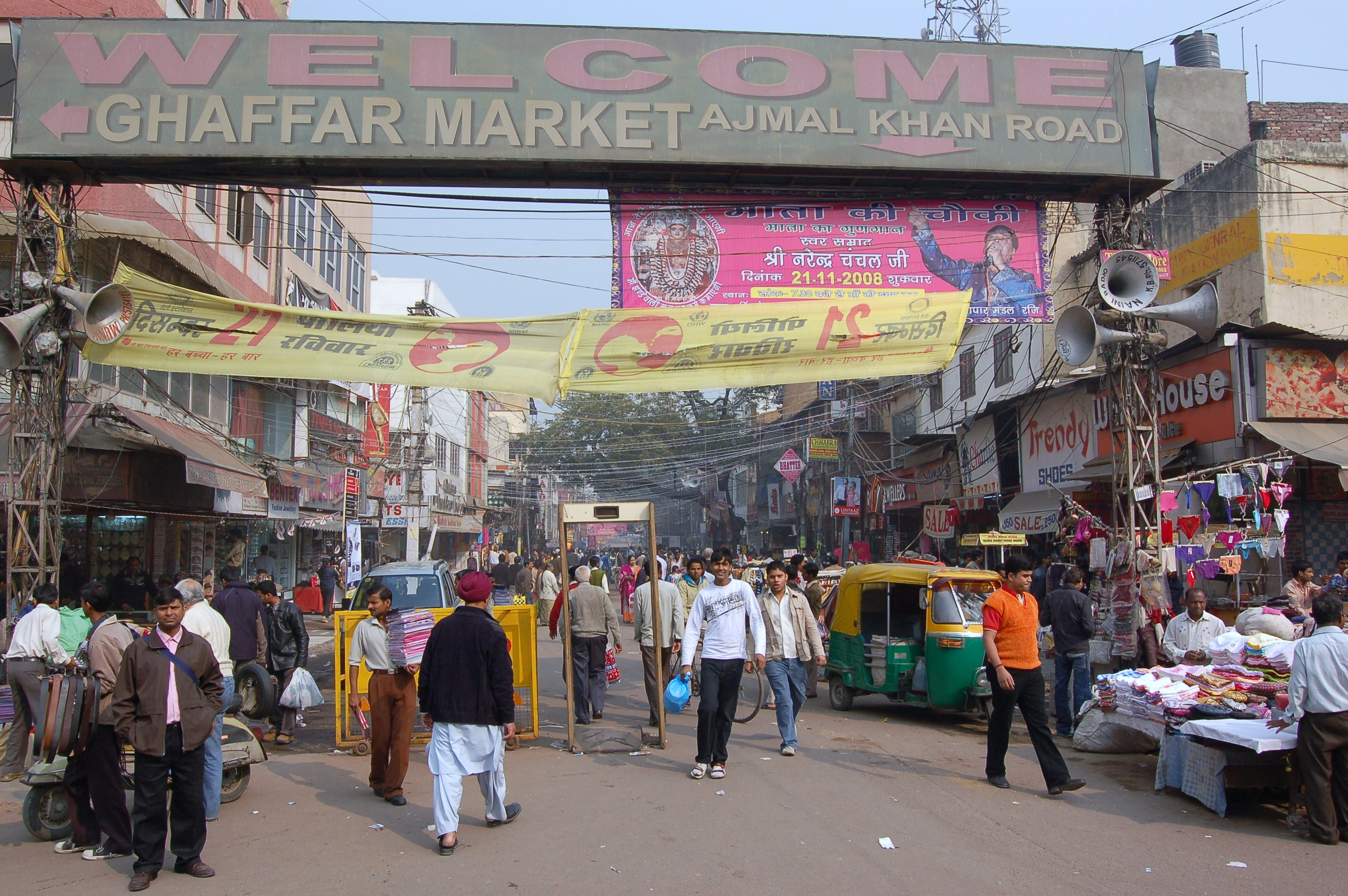
- Ajmal Khan Road, Karol Bagh (November 2008)
- Interactive map of Karol Bagh
- Location within Delhi
- Coordinates: 28.6629°N 77.210°E
- Country: India
- State: Delhi
- District: Central Delhi

Population
  - Total: 505,242
- Time zone: GMT + 0530
- PIN Code: 110005
- Lok Sabha constituency: New Delhi
- Vidhan Sabha constituency: Karol Bagh
- Civic agency: MCD

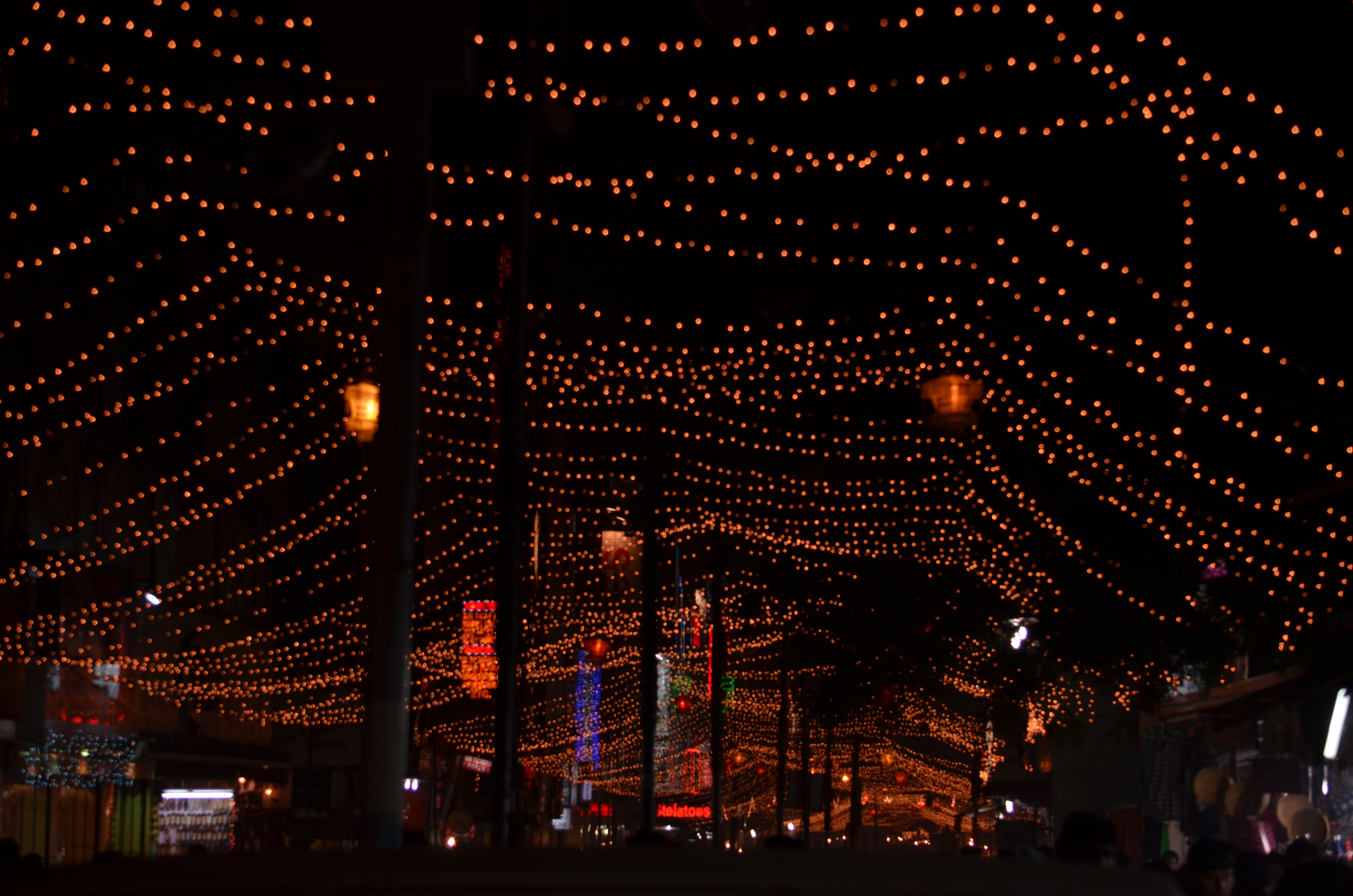
River of lights at Karol Bagh

Karol Bagh (also spelled Qarol Bagh, pronounced [qəroːl baːɣ]) is a neighborhood in Central District of Delhi, India. It is a mixed residential and commercial neighborhood known for shopping streets, such as the Ghaffar Market and Ajmal Khan Road.

It was home to the Karol Bagh Lok Sabha constituency until it was abolished in 2008.

Residential areas W.E.A, Beadon Pura, Reghar Pura, Dev Nagar, and Bapa Nagar have a mix of commercial activities such as wholesale markets Tank Road Garment Market and Hardhyan Singh Road Leather market.

Tank Road wholesale garment market came into existence with a few shopkeepers at the end of the 1980s. It offers multiple stores for ethnic women's wear i.e. suits, sarees, and lehengas.

== Etymology ==
The name Karol Bagh, also spelled Qarol Bagh, derives from the Hindi-Urdu words "Qarol" (क़रोल, قرول) meaning "curved like green chilly" and "Bagh" (बाग़, باغ) meaning "garden". The place was named for the numerous herbal gardens in the area.

== History ==
In the 1920s, the villages of Madhoganj, Jaisingh Pura, Raja ka Bazaar, and others were evacuated to build Connaught Place and nearby areas. The villagers were relocated once to the west of Karol Bagh, then to a second rocky area populated by trees and bushes.

Karol Bagh was primarily populated with Muslims until the mass exodus to Pakistan at the time of the Partition of India in 1947, which also resulted in an influx of refugees from West Punjab and Sindh, many of whom were traders. There is a sizable Marathi-speaking population, a Tamil-speaking population, and a large Bengali community, most of whom are employed in jewellery manufacturing. Karol Bagh hosts one of the oldest Durga Puja in the city.

There were incidents at Karol Bagh during the 1984 anti-Sikh riots, including burning of shops. Karol Bagh was the target of a terrorist bomb blast in Ghaffar Market in October 2008.

== Demographics ==
Karol Bagh has a population of 505,242, with 268,283 being males and 236,958 being females.

== Education ==
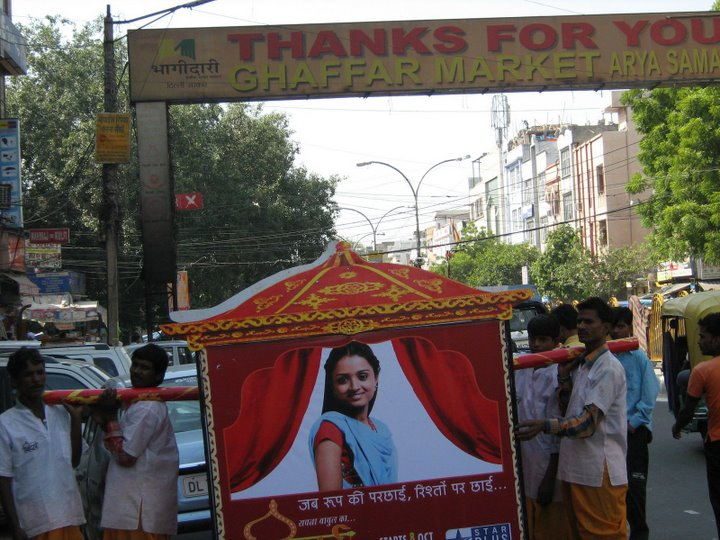
Entrance to the Ghaffar Market, Karol Bagh

The historic Ayurvedic and Unani Tibbia College was inaugurated here by Mahatma Gandhi in 1921, and Sri Guru Nanak Dev Khalsa College of Delhi University is situated here.

Faith Academy Senior Secondary School is a Christian minority school on John L Dorsey Road. The school was founded in East Patel Pragar in 1964.

== Markets ==
The Karol Bagh market is one of the oldest shopping centers in Delhi. Many areas of the market specialise in a particular field:

- Ajmal Khan Road once specialised in inexpensive ready-made garments, cotton yarn, and embroidered garments. Now this road has large stores and international labels, along with Indian munchies and masalas (spices).
- Arya Samaj Road specialises in second-hand books.
- Bank Street is known for its jewellery shops, especially jewellery for the bridal trousseau.
- Ghaffar Market sells products such as cosmetics, watches, cell phones, and footwear.

== Transport ==
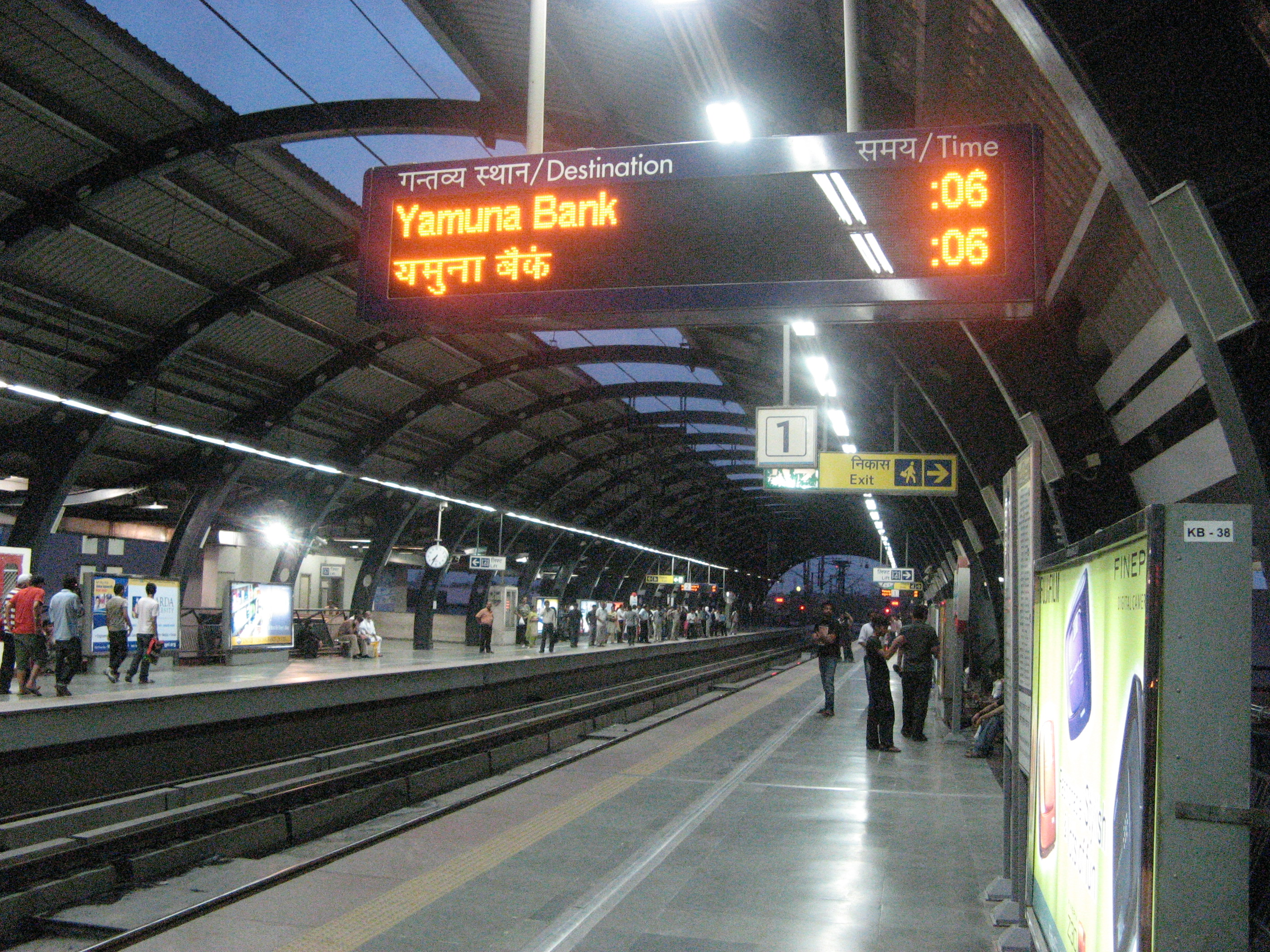
Karol Bagh Metro Station

The nearest railway stations are Delhi Sarai Rohilla and Delhi Kishanganj, both about a kilometer from Central Karol Bagh. Karol Bagh is situated at a distance of 20 – 22 km from the Indira Gandhi International Airport, and 4.1 km from New Delhi Railway Station. It is also serviced by the Karol Bagh Metro station, located on the Blue Line of the Delhi Metro.

== Gallery ==
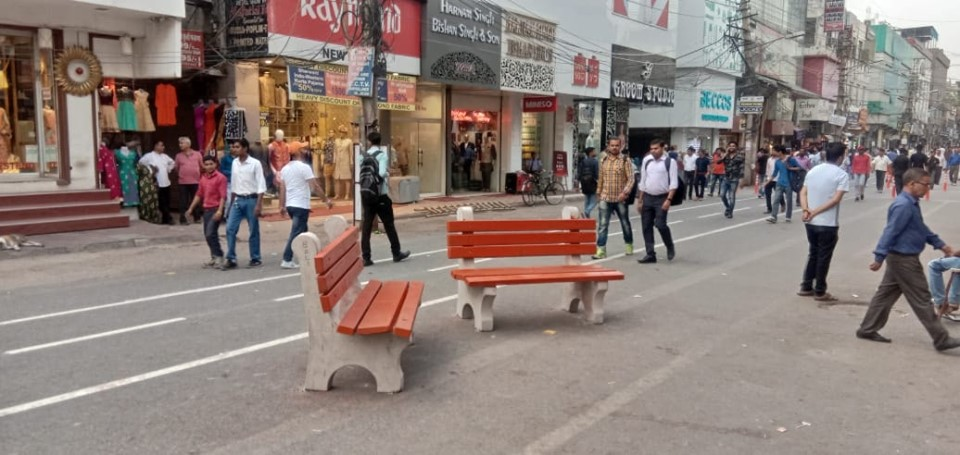
Karol Bagh Market

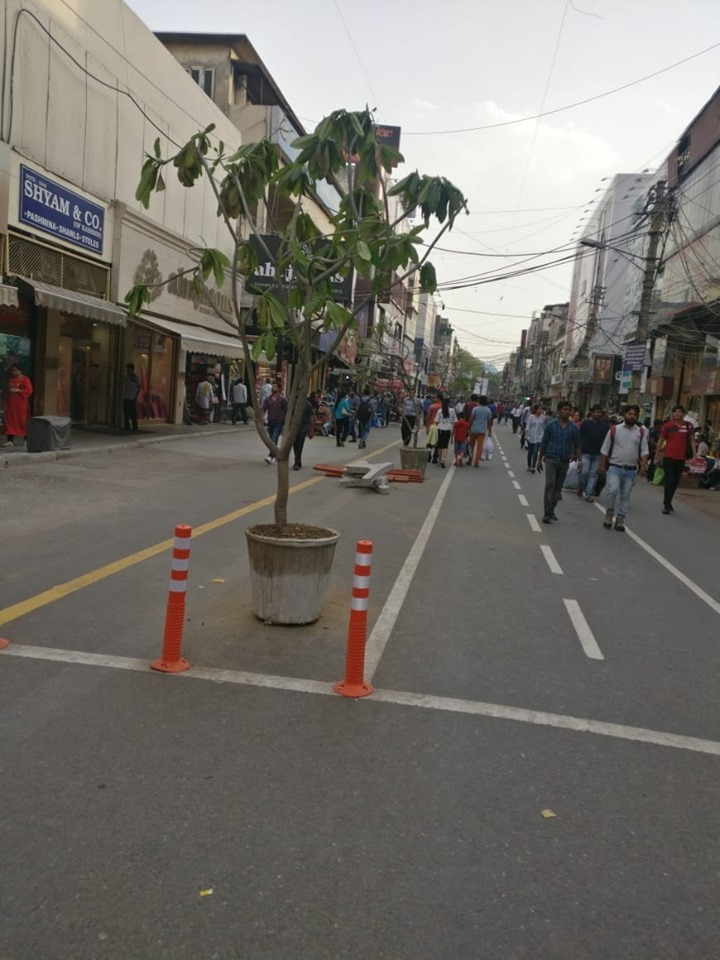
Karol Bagh Market

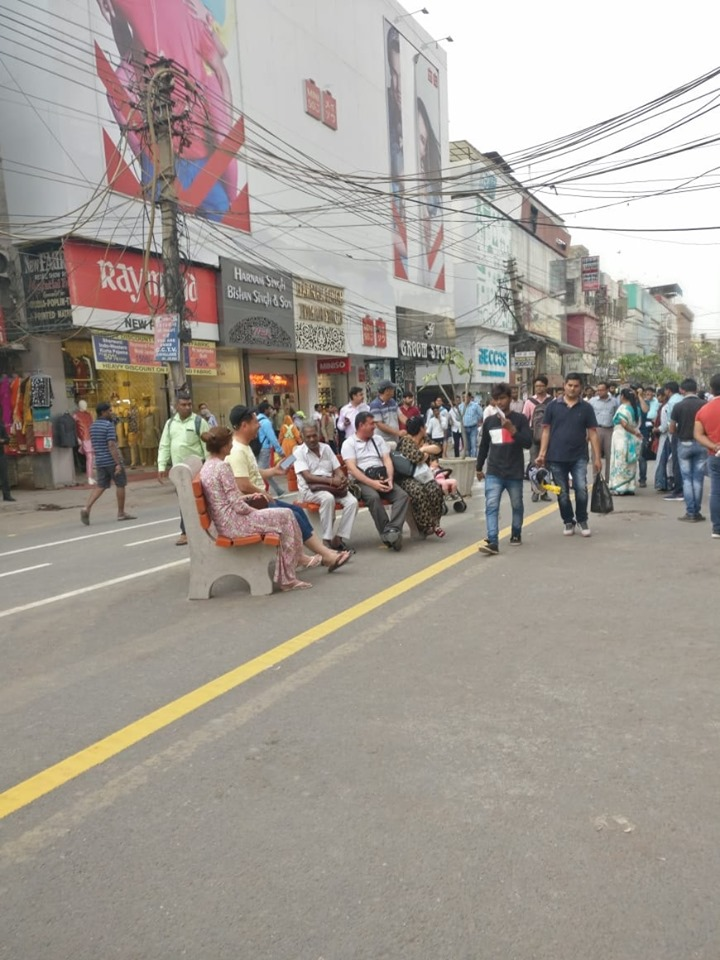
Karol Bagh 2019

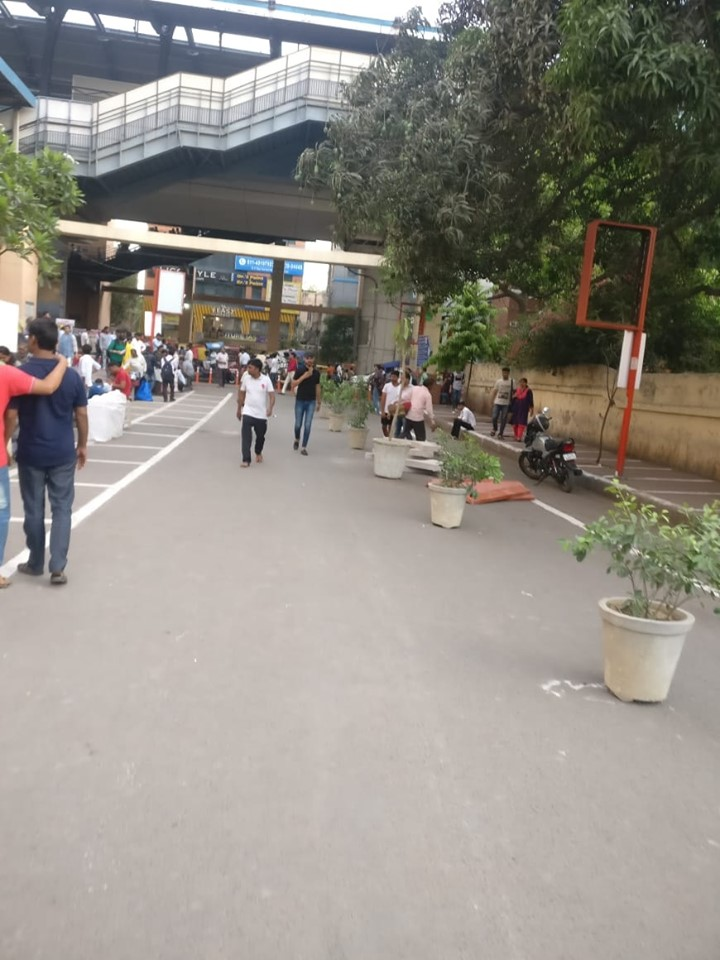
Karol Bagh Metro Station

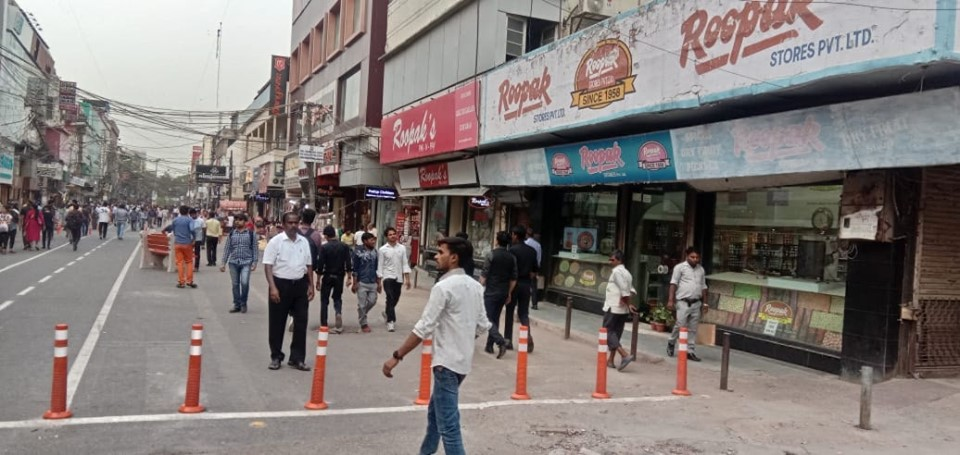
Karol Bagh Market

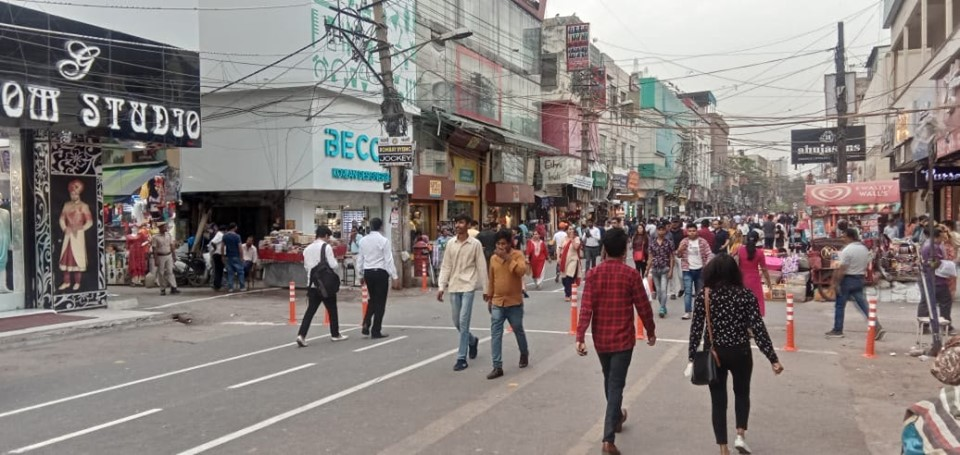
Karol Bagh Market

== In popular culture ==
- A TV series shown on Zee TV, 12/24 Karol Bagh (2009–2010), was shot and produced in Delhi. Its subsequent success started the trend for many TV serials being set in Delhi.
- Zoya Singh Solanki, the central character in the romantic comedy novel by Anuja Chauhan, The Zoya Factor (2008) lives in Karol Bagh, who ends up becoming the lucky mascot for the Indian cricket team in the novel.
- In recent years the 108-foot Hanuman statue has become an iconic landmark marking the entrance to Karol Bagh and is seen regularly featured in Bollywood movies showcasing Delhi.
- In the 2021 movie Bell Bottom, Akshay Kumar's character lived in Gurudwara Road, Karol Bagh.
- In the movie Befikre, Ranveer Singh's character lived in Karol Bagh. There's a dialogue that says "you might have left Karol Bagh, but Karol Bagh hasn't left you".
