= Patel Nagar =

- Sub-division
- Location in Delhi, India
- Coordinates: 28.6505°N 77.1691°E
- Country: India
- State: Delhi
- District: West Delhi

Government
  - Body: Municipal Corporation Of Delhi

Languages
  - Official: Hindi, English
- Time zone: UTC+5:30 (IST)
- Postal code: 110008
- Lok Sabha constituency: New Delhi
- Vidhan Sabha constituency: Patel Nagar
- Current Member of the Legislative Assembly: Raaj Kumar Anand
- Civic agency: MCD
- MP: Meenakshi Lekhi

Patel Nagar is one of the 3 sub-division of the West Delhi District in India.

== Area ==
Patel Nagar was developed on land acquired from the villages of Shadipur, Khampur, and neighboring settlements.

Patel Nagar is a large area and divided into the following colonies:

- West Patel Nagar
- East Patel Nagar
- South Patel Nagar

== Neighbouring areas ==
Patel Nagar's neighboring areas are Prem Nagar,Nehru Nagar, Baljit Nagar, Pusa Road, Rajendra Place, New Rajendra Nagar, Old Rajendra Nagar, Prasad Nagar, Shadipur, Khampur, Karol Bagh, Baba Farid Puri, Inderpuri, Pusa Institute, Tank Road, Shankar Road, & Naraina.

== Metro station ==
There are three metro stations in or near Patel Nagar: Rajendra Place, Patel Nagar and Shadipur. The Shadipur Metro Station is suitable for traveling to some parts of West Patel Nagar, Baljit Nagar and Baba Farid Puri. Patel Nagar metro station is suitable for traveling to some parts of South Patel Nagar, East Patel Nagar and West Patel Nagar. Rajendra Place (close to Jaypee Siddharth) metro station is suitable for traveling to some parts of East Patel Nagar and South Patel Nagar.

== Major landmarks ==
Sardar Vallabh Bhai Patel Hospital

== Politics ==
Patel Nagar comes under the jurisdiction of New Delhi (Lok Sabha constituency). The current MP is Meenakshi Lekhi of Bhartiya Janata Party.
