= Delhi Sultanate =

Late medieval empire in the Indian subcontinent (1206–1526)

Sultanate of Delhi سلطنت دهلی (Persian) Salṭanat-i-Dehlī
- 1206–1526
- Flag of the Delhi Sultanate according to the contemporary Catalan Atlas (c. 1375).

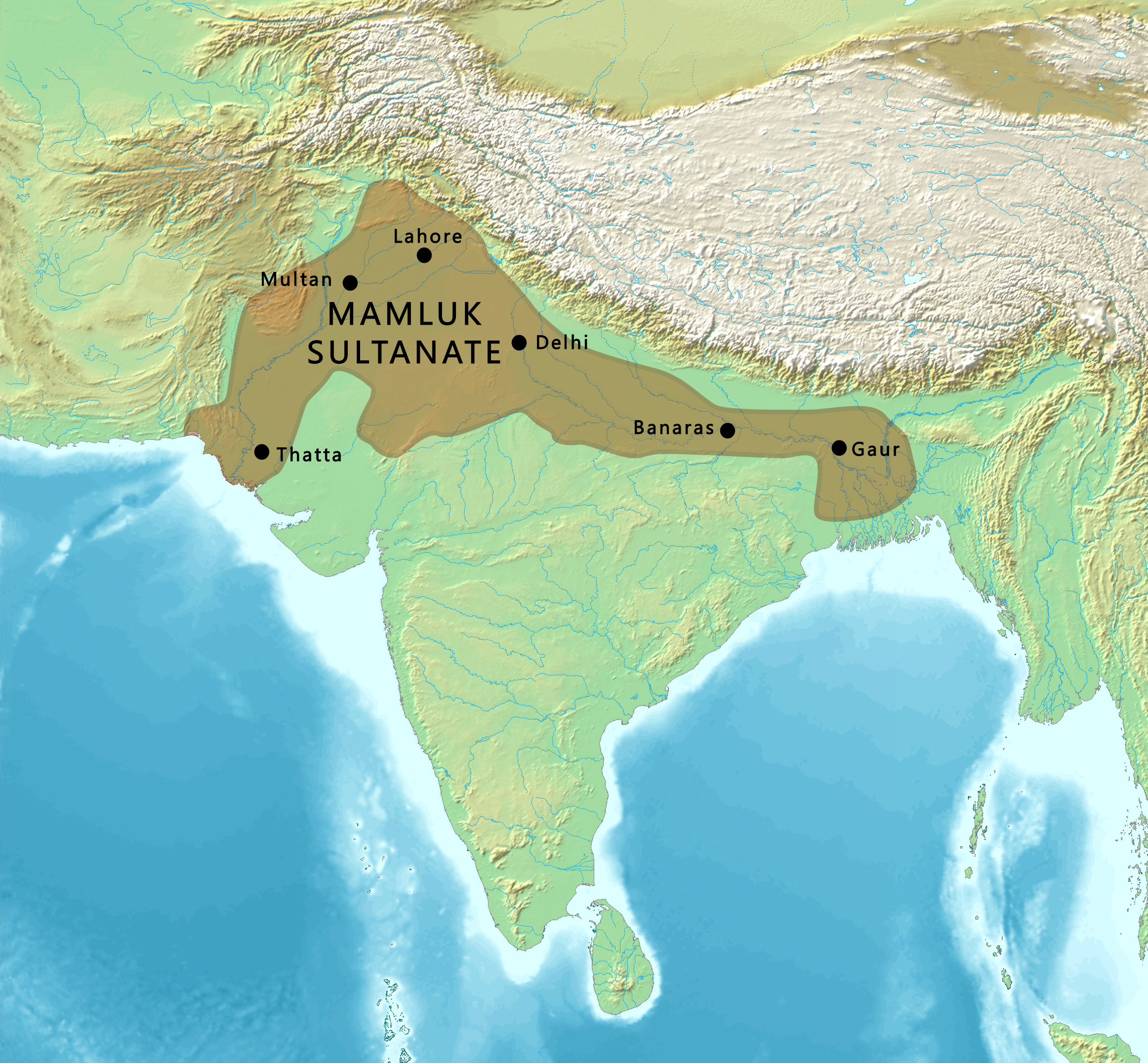
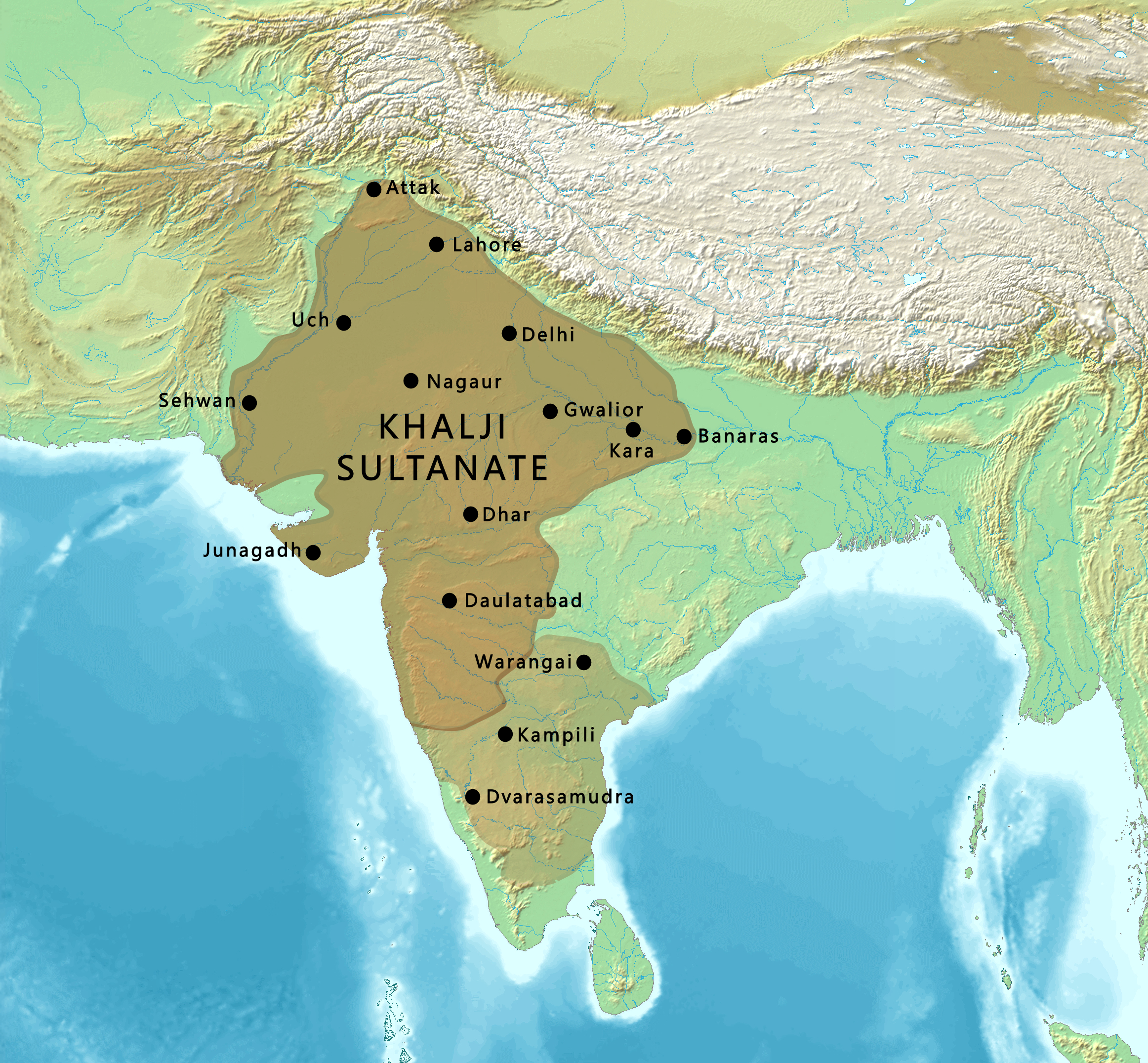
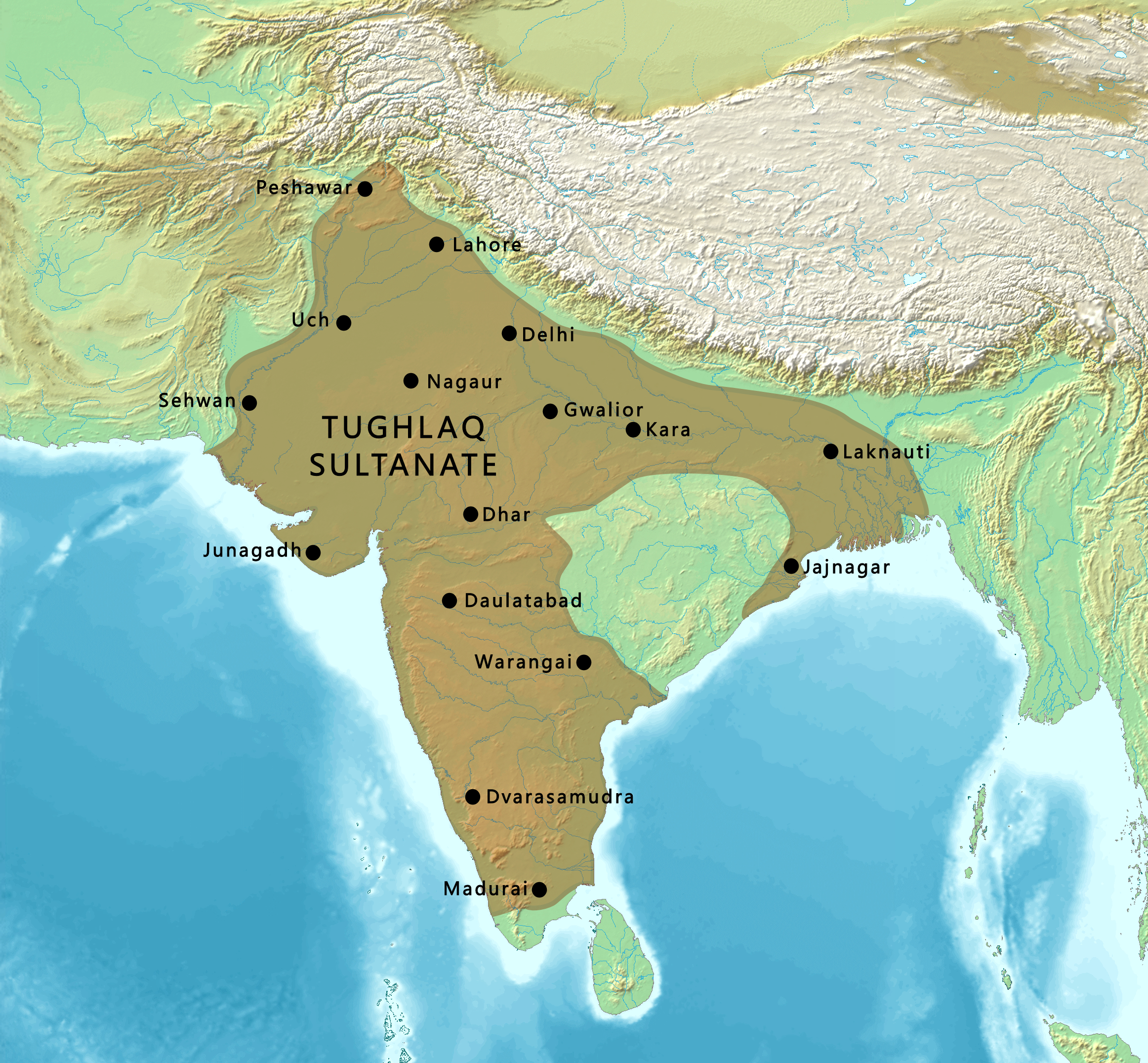
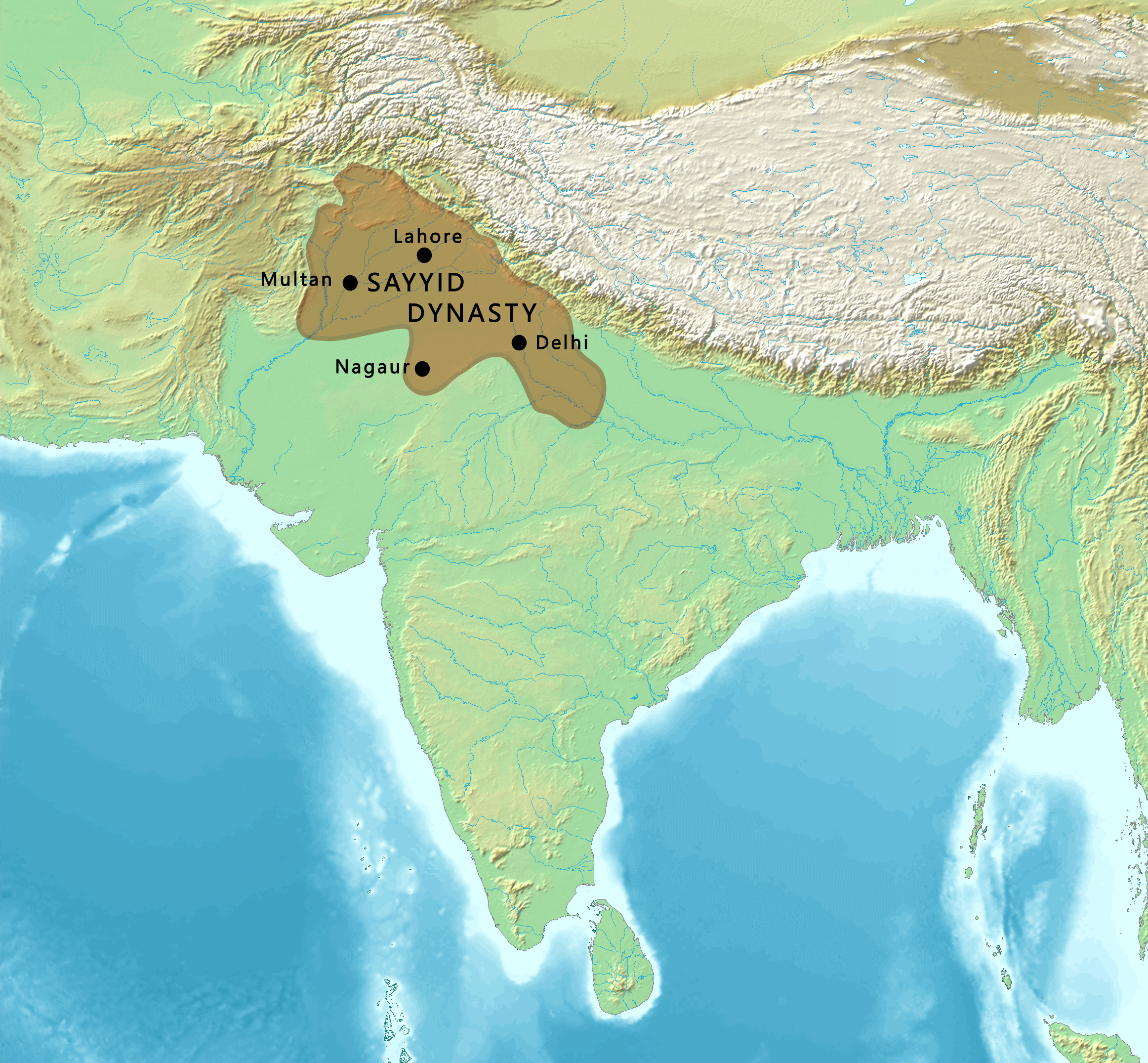
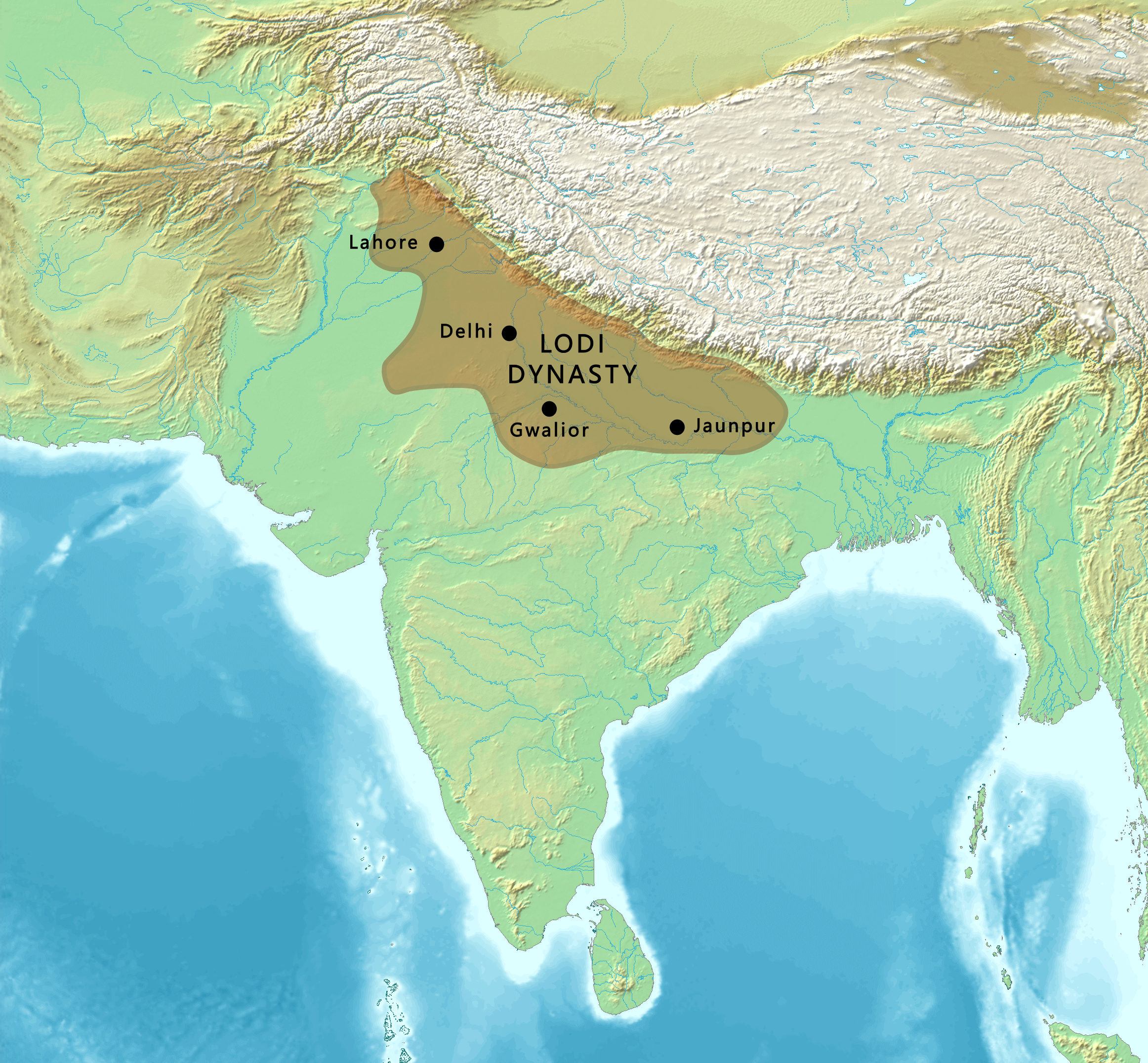
- Status: Sultanate
- Capital: Lahore (1206–1210); Badayun (1210–1214); Delhi (1214–1327; 1334–1506); Daulatabad (1327–1334); Agra (1506–1526)
- Official languages: Hindustani; Persian
- Religion: Sunni Islam (state religion); Hinduism (majority); Jainism; Buddhism; Christianity; Sikhism; Zoroastrianism
- Government: Absolute monarchy
- Sultan
  - 1206–1210: Qutb ud-Din Aibak (first)
  - 1517–1526: Ibrahim Khan Lodi (last)
- Legislature: Corps of Forty (1211–1266)
- Historical era: Medieval India
  - Independence: 25 June 1206
  - Khalji Revolution: 1 February – 13 June 1290
  - Battle of Lahrawat: 6 September 1320
  - Sack of Delhi: 17–20 December 1398
  - Battle of Panipat: 21 April 1526

Area
- 1250: 1,300,000 km^{2} (500,000 sq mi)
- 1300: 1,500,000 km^{2} (580,000 sq mi)
- 1312: 3,200,000 km^{2} (1,200,000 sq mi)
- 1350: 2,800,000 km^{2} (1,100,000 sq mi)

Population
  - 1500 estimate: 101,000,000
- Currency: Taka
| Preceded by | Succeeded by |
| Ghurid dynasty; Middle kingdoms of India | Mughal Empire; Vijayanagara Empire |
- Today part of: India; Pakistan; Bangladesh; Nepal

The Delhi Sultanate or the Sultanate of Delhi was a late medieval empire primarily based in Delhi that stretched over large parts of the Indian subcontinent for more than three centuries. The sultanate was established in 1206 in the former Ghurid territories in India. Its history is generally divided into five periods: Mamluk (1206–1290), Khalji (1290–1320), Tughlaq (1320–1414), Sayyid (1414–1451), and Lodi (1451–1526). It covered large swaths of territory in modern-day India, Pakistan, Bangladesh, as well as some parts of southern Nepal.

The foundation of the sultanate was laid by the Ghurid conqueror Muhammad Ghori, who routed the Rajput confederacy, led by Ajmer ruler Prithviraj Chauhan, in 1192 near Tarain, in a reversal of an earlier battle. As a successor to the Ghurid dynasty, the Delhi Sultanate was originally one of several principalities ruled by the Turkic slave-generals of Muhammad Ghori, who had inherited and divided the Ghurid territories amongst themselves. Khalji and Tughlaq rule ushered a new wave of rapid and continual Muslim conquests deep into southern India. The sultanate reached its geographical zenith under the Tughlaq dynasty, occupying most of the Indian subcontinent during the reign of Muhammad bin Tughluq. A major political transformation occurred across northern India, triggered by the Central Asian king Timur's devastating raid on Delhi in 1398, coinciding with the re-emergence of rival Hindu powers such as Vijayanagara Empire and Kingdom of Mewar, and new Muslim sultanates such as the Bengal and Bahmani sultanates asserting independence. In 1526, Timurid ruler Babur invaded northern India and conquered the sultanate, leading to its succession by the Mughal Empire.

The establishment of the sultanate drew the Indian subcontinent more closely into international and multicultural Islamic social and economic networks, as seen concretely in the development of the Hindustani language and Indo-Islamic architecture. It was also one of the few powers to repel attacks by the Mongols (from the Chagatai Khanate) and saw the enthronement of one of the few female rulers in Islamic history, Razia Sultana (r. 1236 – 1240). The sultans generally accepted Hindu officials and vassals as well as native Muslims converted from Hinduism in the administration, and presented themselves as a paramount power instead of sovereigns, according to the Hindu political traditions. However, there were cases like Bakhtiyar Khalji's annexations, which involved a large-scale desecration of Hindu and Buddhist temples and the destruction of universities and libraries. Mongolian raids on West and Central Asia set the scene for centuries of migration of fleeing soldiers, intelligentsia, mystics, traders, artists, and artisans from those regions into the subcontinent, thereby establishing Islamic culture there.

== Name ==
Although conventionally named after its principal capital city, Delhi, the terminology applied to the Delhi Sultanate was often not fixed. It was called the "Empire of Delhi" (Persian: Mamalik-i-Delhi) by Minhaj-i Siraj Juzjani and Ziauddin Barani, while Ibn Battuta referred to the empire under Muhammad bin Tughlaq as "Hind and Sind". The Delhi Sultanate was also known as the "Empire of Hindustan" (Persian: Mamalik-i-Hindustan), a name that gained currency during this period.

== History ==
=== Background ===
Like other agrarian societies in history, those in the Indian subcontinent have been attacked by nomadic tribes throughout its long history. The northwestern subcontinent was a frequent target of tribes raiding from Central Asia in the pre-Islamic era, and the Muslim intrusions and later Muslim invasions were not dissimilar to those of the earlier invasions during the 1st millennium.

The rise of the Delhi Sultanate in India was part of a wider trend affecting much of the Asian continent, including the whole of southern and western Asia: the influx of nomadic Turkic peoples from the Central Asian steppes that traces back to the 9th century when the Islamic caliphate began fragmenting in the Middle East. Muslim rulers in rival states began enslaving non-Muslim nomadic Turks from the Central Asian steppes and raising many of them to become loyal army slaves called Mamluks. Soon, Turks were migrating to Muslim lands and becoming Islamicized. Many of the Turkic Mamluk slaves eventually rose to become rulers and conquered large parts of the Muslim world, establishing Mamluk Sultanates from Egypt to present-day Afghanistan, before turning their attention to the Indian subcontinent.

Main South Asian polities in 1175, on the eve of the Ghurid Empire invasion of the subcontinent. Orange line: Ghurid territorial conquests from 1175 to 1205, which led to the establishment of the Delhi Sultanate in 1206.

By 962 CE, Hindu and Buddhist kingdoms in South Asia faced a series of raids from Muslim armies from Central Asia. Among them was Mahmud of Ghazni, the son of a Turkic Mamluk military slave, who raided and plundered kingdoms in northern India from east of the Indus river to west of the Yamuna river seventeen times between 997 and 1030. Mahmud of Ghazni raided the treasuries but retreated each time, only extending Islamic rule into western Punjab.

The series of raids on northern and western Indian kingdoms by Muslim warlords continued after Mahmud of Ghazni. The raids did not establish or extend the permanent boundaries of the Islamic kingdoms. In contrast, the Ghurid Sultan Mu'izz ad-Din Muhammad Ghori (commonly known as Muhammad of Ghor) began a systematic war of expansion into northern India in 1173. He sought to carve out a principality for himself and expand the Islamic world. Muhammad of Ghor created a Sunni Islamic kingdom of his own extending east of the Indus River, and he thus laid the foundation for the Muslim kingdom called the Delhi Sultanate. Some historians chronicle the Delhi Sultanate from 1192 due to the presence and geographical claims of Muhammad of Ghor in South Asia by that time.

Muhammad of Ghor was assassinated in 1206 by Isma'ili Shi'a Muslims. After the assassination, his Mamluks, including Taj al-Din Yildiz, Qutb ud-Din Aibak, Bahauddin Tughril and Nasir ad-Din Qabacha, divided the empire among themselves. One of Ghor's slaves (or Mamluks), the Turkic Qutb ud-Din Aibak, assumed power, becoming the first Sultan of Delhi.

=== Dynasties ===
==== Mamluk dynasty (1206–1290) ====
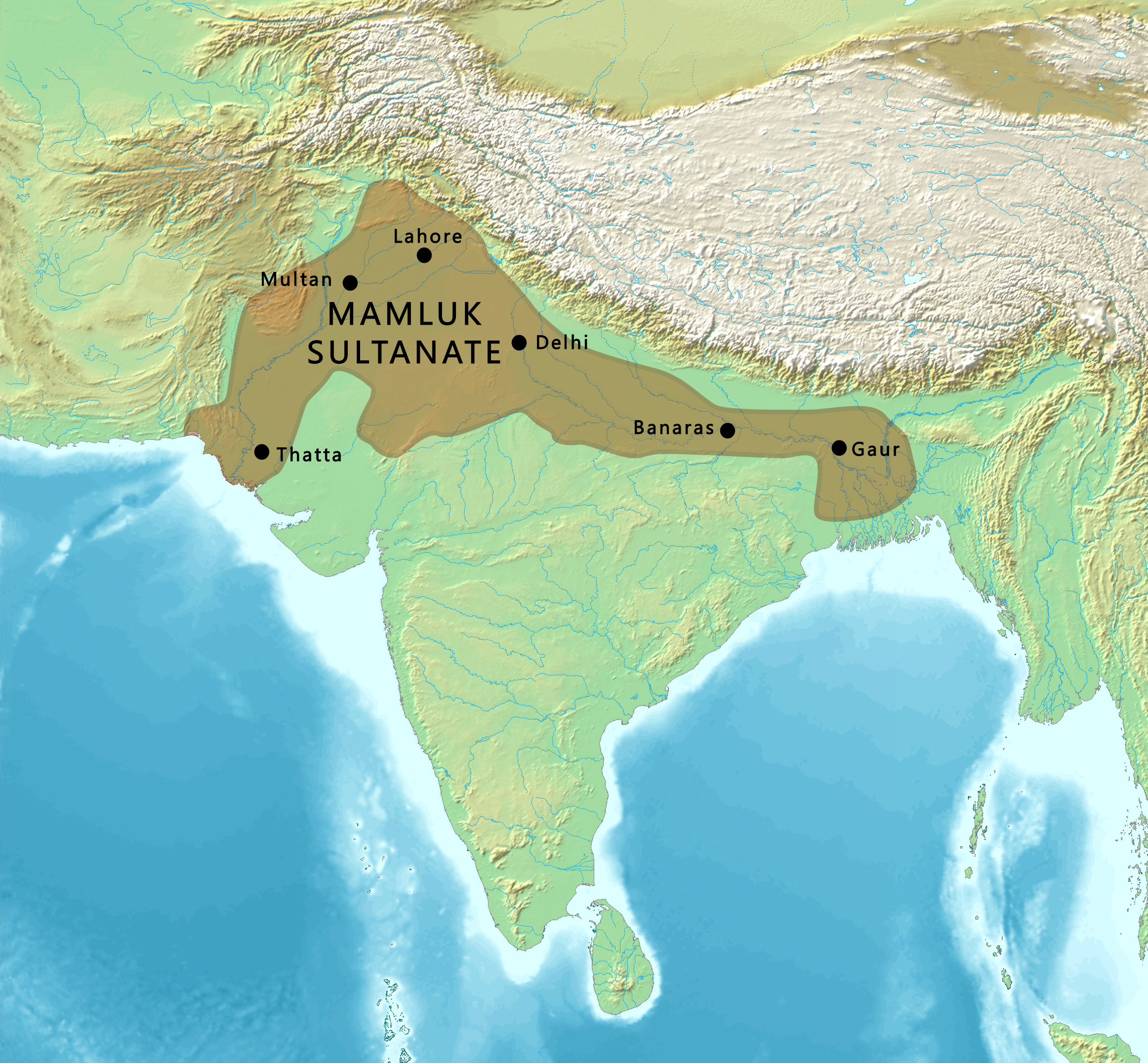
Territory of the Delhi Mamluk dynasty circa 1250.

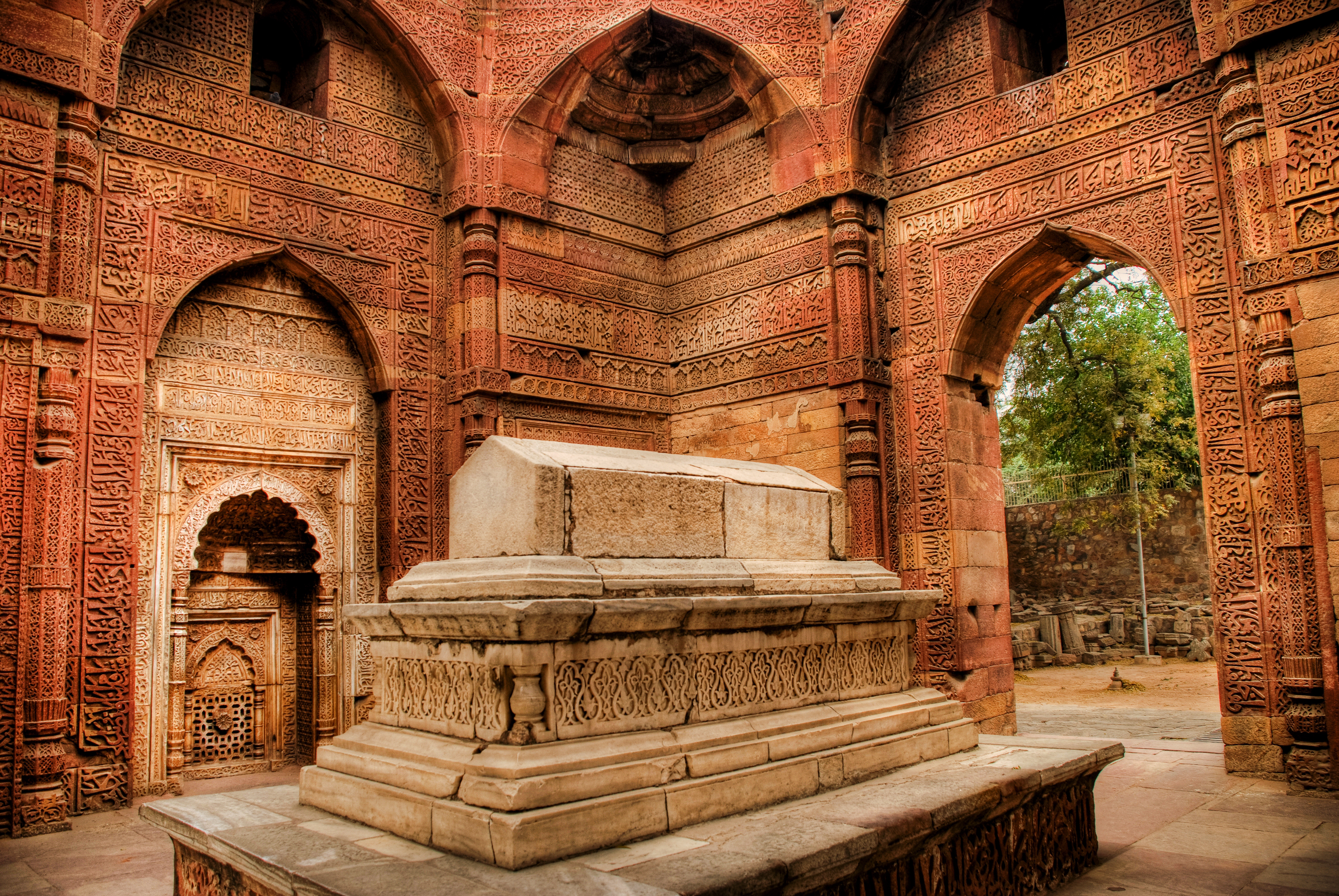
Tomb of Iltutmish (r. 1211–1236) in the Qutb Minar complex.

Qutb ud-Din Aibak, a former slave of Mu'izz ad-Din Muhammad Ghori, was the first ruler of the Delhi Sultanate. Aibak was of Turkic Cuman-Kipchak origin, and due to his background, the dynasty he founded is known as the Mamluk dynasty. Aibak reigned as the Sultan of Delhi for four years, from 1206 to 1210. He was praised by the contemporary and later accounts for his generosity and was known with the sobriquet of Lakhbaksh (provider of lakhs).

After Aibak died, Aram Shah assumed power in 1210, but he was assassinated in 1211 by Aibak's son-in-law, Shams ud-Din Iltutmish. Iltutmish's power was precarious, and several Muslim amirs (nobles) challenged his authority as they had been supporters of Qutb al-Din Aibak. After a series of conquests and brutal executions of opposition, Iltutmish consolidated his power.

His rule was challenged several times, such as by Qubacha, and this led to a series of wars. Iltutmish conquered Multan and Bengal from contesting Muslim rulers, as well as Ranthambore and Sivalik from the Hindu rulers. He also attacked, defeated, and executed Taj al-Din Yildiz, who asserted his rights as heir to Mu'izz ad-Din Muhammad Ghori. Iltutmish's rule lasted until 1236. Following his death, the Delhi Sultanate saw a succession of weak rulers, rebellious Muslim nobility, assassinations, and short-lived tenures. Power shifted from Rukn ud-Din Firuz to Razia Sultana and others, until Ghiyas ud-Din Balban came to power and ruled from 1266 to 1287. Ghiyasuddin Balban destroyed the power of the Corps of Forty, a council of usually forty Turkic slaves who had played a role as kingmakers and had been independent of the sultan. He was succeeded by 17-year-old Muiz ud-Din Qaiqabad, who appointed Jalal ud-Din Firuz Khalji as the commander of the army. Khalji assassinated Qaiqabad and assumed power in the Khalji Revolution, thus ending the Mamluk dynasty and founding the Khalji dynasty.

Qutb ud-Din Aibak initiated the construction of the Qutb Minar but died before it was completed. It was later completed by his son-in-law, Iltutmish. The Quwwat-ul-Islam (Might of Islam) Mosque was built by Aibak, now a UNESCO world heritage site. The Qutub Minar Complex was expanded by Iltutmish, and later by Ala ud-Din Khalji in the early 14th century. (Note: Welch and Crane note that the Quwwat-ul-Islam Mosque was built with the remains of demolished Hindu and Jain temples.) During the Mamluk dynasty, many nobles from Afghanistan and Persia migrated and settled in India, as West Asia came under Mongol onslaught.

==== Khalji dynasty (1290–1320) ====
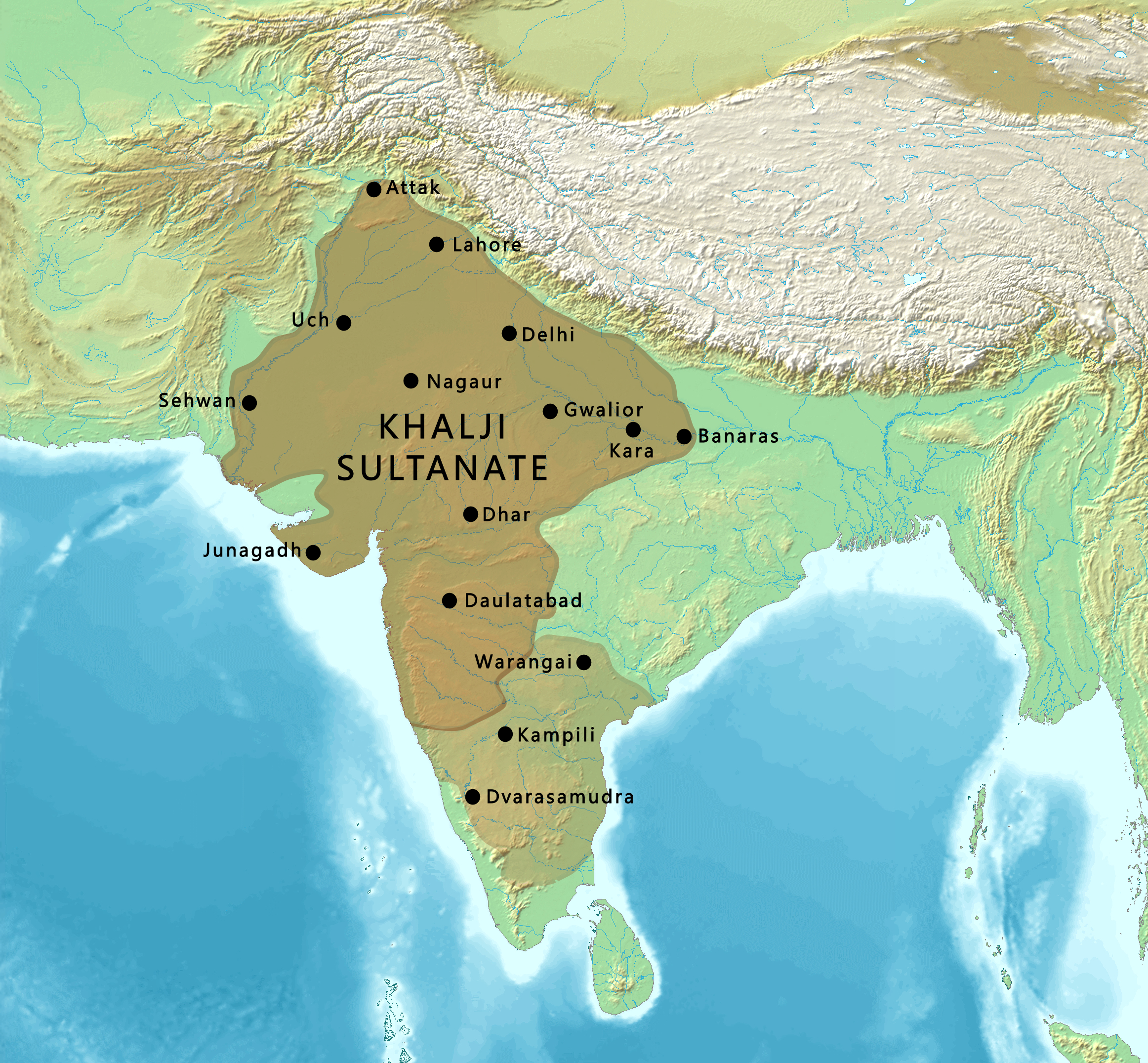
Territory controlled by Khalji dynasty circa 1320.

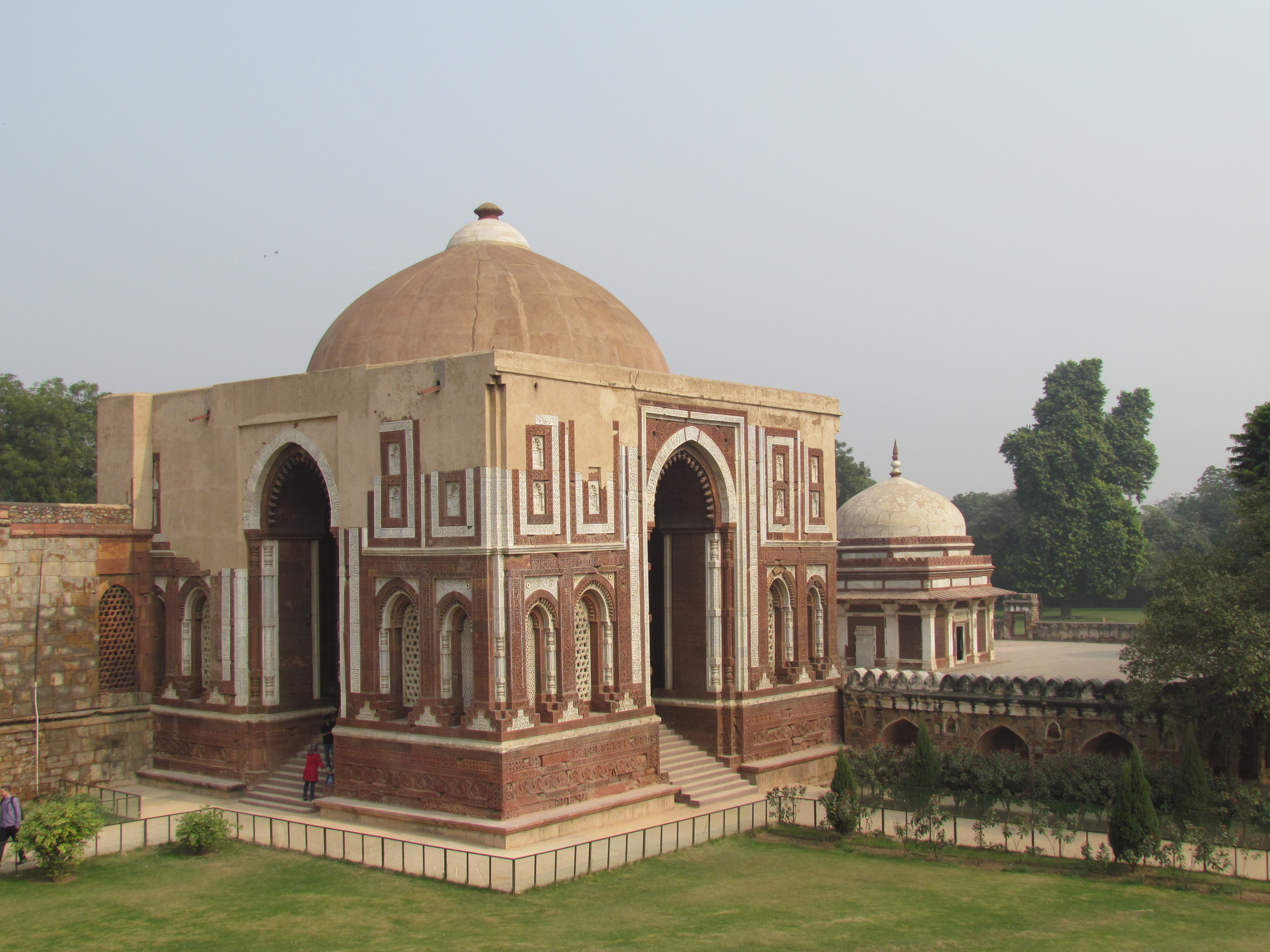
The Alai Darwaza, completed in 1311 during the Khalji dynasty.

The Khalji dynasty was of Turco-Afghan heritage. They were originally Turkic, but due to their long presence in Afghanistan, they were treated by others as Afghan as they adopted Afghan habits and customs.

The first ruler of the Khalji dynasty was Jalal ud-Din Firuz Khalji. He was around 70 years old at the time of his ascension and was known as a mild-mannered, humble and kind monarch to the general public. Jalal ud-Din Firuz ruled for 6 years before he was murdered in 1296 by Muhammad Salim of Samana, on the orders of his nephew and son-in-law Juna Muhammad Khalji, who later came to be known as Ala ud-Din Khalji.

Ala ud-Din began his military career as governor of Kara province, from where he led two raids on the Kingdom of Malwa (1292) and Devagiri (1294) for plunder and loot. After he acceded to the throne, expansions towards these kingdoms were renewed including Gujarat, which was conquered by the grand vizier Nusrat Khan Jalesari, the kingdom of Malwa by Ainul Mulk Multani, as well as Rajputana. However, these victories were cut short because of Mongol attacks and plunder raids from the northwest. The Mongols withdrew after plundering and stopped raiding the northwest parts of the Delhi Sultanate.

After the Mongols withdrew, Ala ud-Din Khalji continued to expand the Delhi Sultanate into southern India with the help of Indian slave generals such as Malik Kafur and Khusro Khan. They collected much war booty (anwatan) from those they defeated. His commanders collected war spoils and paid ghanima (Arabic: الْغَنيمَة, a tax on spoils of war), which helped strengthen the Khalji rule. Among the spoils was the Warangal loot that included the famous Koh-i-Noor diamond.

In South India, Malik Kafur's 1311 campaign reached the Pandya kingdom, plundering the Nataraja Temple at Chidambaram and the Renganathaswamy Temple at Srirangam before sacking the Pandyan capital at Madurai to seize accumulated treasury. The subsequent Delhi incursions under the Thugluqs led to the establishment of Madurai Sultanate (1335–1378). Contemporary Sanskrit sources, such as Gangadevi's Madhurāvijayam, document the widespread cessation of worship in temples. While also documenting the ruins of agricultural infrastructure during this period, her text frames Kumara Kampana's southern campaign as a liberation of sacred sites by Vijayanagara Empire.

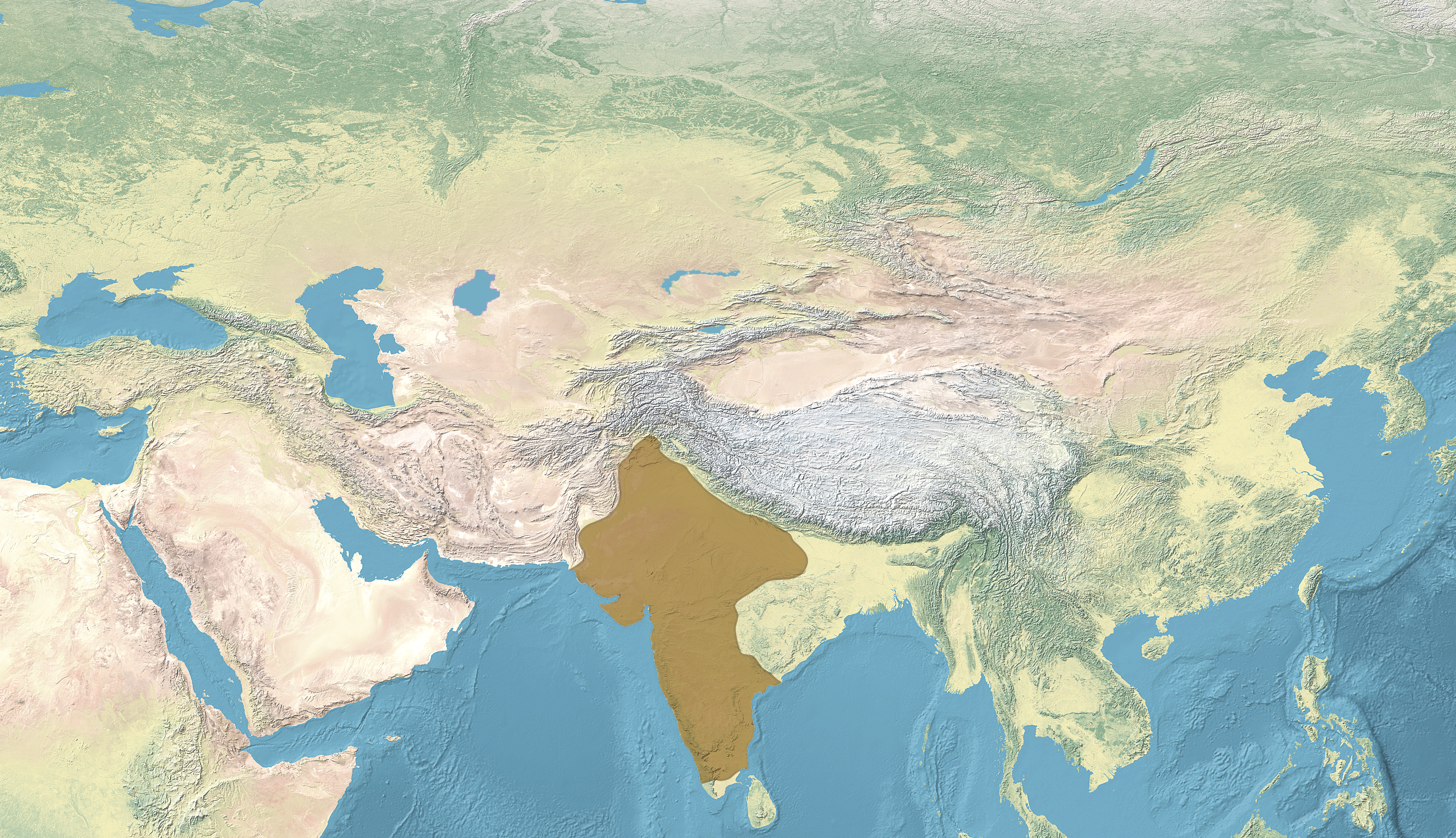
The Delhi Sultanate and contemporary Asian polities circa 1320. Most of the Asian continent was occupied by the Mongol Empire by that time, with Turkic polities occupying South and Western Asia, as far as Egypt where they established the Mamluk Sultanate.

Ala ud-Din Khalji changed tax policies, raising agricultural taxes from 20% to 50% (payable in grain and agricultural produce), eliminating payments and commissions on taxes collected by local chiefs, banning socialisation among his officials as well as inter-marriage between noble families to help prevent any opposition forming against him, and he cut salaries of officials, poets and scholars. These tax policies and spending controls strengthened his treasury to pay the keep of his growing army; he also introduced price controls on all agricultural produce and goods in the kingdom, as well as controls on where, how, and by whom these goods could be sold. Markets called "shahana-i-mandi" were created. Muslim merchants were granted exclusive permits and monopoly in these "mandis" to buy and resell at official prices. No one other than these merchants could buy from farmers or sell in cities. Those found violating these "mandi" rules were severely punished, often by mutilation. Taxes collected in the form of grain were stored in the kingdom's storage. During the famines that followed, these granaries ensured sufficient food for the army.

Historians note Ala ud-Din Khalji as being a tyrant. Anyone, Ala ud-Din suspected of being a threat to this power, was killed along with the men, women, and children of that family. He grew to eventually distrust the majority of his nobles and favoured only a handful of his slaves and family. In 1298, between 15 000 and 30 000 Mongols near Delhi, who had recently converted to Islam, were slaughtered in a single day, due to a mutiny during an invasion of Gujarat. He is also known for his cruelty against the kingdoms he defeated in battle.

After Ala ud-Din died in 1316 by assassination through his nobles, his general Malik Kafur, who was born to a Hindu family but converted to Islam, assumed de facto power and was supported by non-Khalji nobles like Kamal al-Din Gurg. However, he lacked the support of the majority of Khalji's nobles who had him assassinated, hoping to take power for themselves. However, the new ruler had the killers of Kafur executed.

The last Khalji ruler was Ala ud-Din Khalji's 18-year-old son Qutb ud-Din Mubarak Shah Khalji, who ruled for four years before he was killed by Khusrau Khan, another slave-general with Indian origins, who reverted from Islam and favoured his Hindu Baradu military clan in the nobility. Khusrau Khan's reign lasted only a few months, when Ghazi Malik, later to be called Ghiyath al-Din Tughluq, defeated and killed him and assumed power in 1320, thus ending the Khalji dynasty and starting the Tughlaq dynasty.

==== Tughlaq dynasty (1320–1413) ====
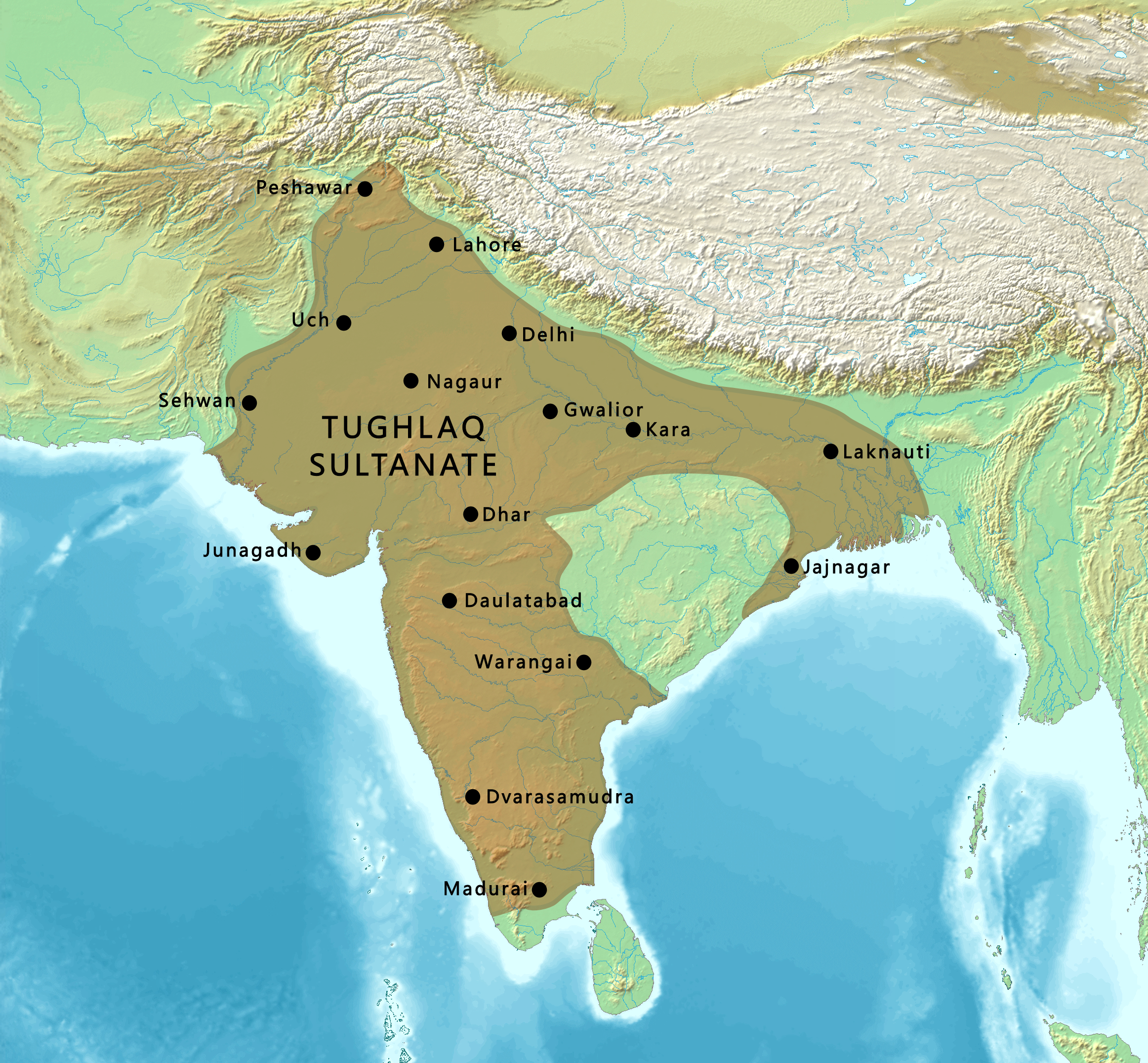
Territory of the Tughlaq dynasty circa 1330–1335, corresponding to the maximum extent of the Delhi Sultanate.

Ghiyath al-Din Tughlaq, of Turko-Mongol or Turkic extraction, ruled for five years and built a town near Delhi named Tughlaqabad. His son Juna Khan and general Ainul Mulk Multani conquered Warangal in south India. According to some historians such as Vincent Smith, he was killed by his son Juna Khan, who then assumed power in 1325.

Juna Khan, better known as Muhammad bin Tughluq, ruled for 26 years. During his rule, the Delhi Sultanate reached its peak in terms of geographical reach, covering most of the Indian subcontinent.

Muhammad bin Tughluq was an intellectual, with extensive knowledge of the Quran, Fiqh, poetry and other fields. He was also deeply suspicious of his kinsmen and wazirs (ministers), extremely severe with his opponents, and took decisions that caused economic upheaval. For example, he ordered the minting of coins from base metals with face value of silver coins – a decision that failed because ordinary people minted counterfeit coins from base metals they had in their houses and used them to pay taxes and jizya.

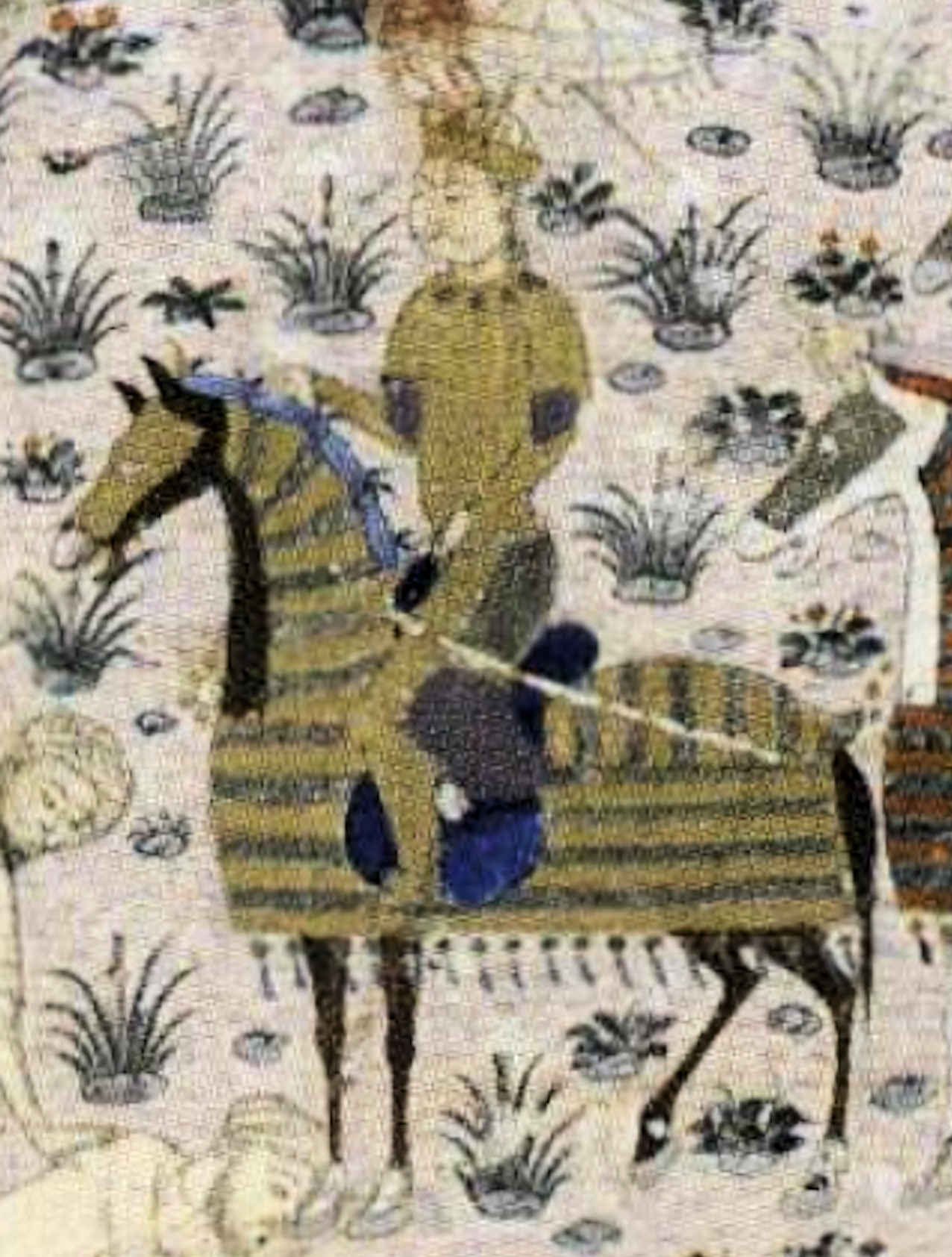
Depiction of Ghiyath al-Din Tughluq, founder of the Tughlaq dynasty, in the Basātin al-uns by Ikhtisān-i Dabir, a member of the Tughluq court and an ambassador to Iran. Ca. 1410 Jalayirid copy of 1326 lost original.

Muhammad bin Tughlaq chose the city of Deogiri in the present-day Indian state of Maharashtra (renaming it Daulatabad), as the second administrative capital of the Delhi Sultanate. He ordered a forced migration of the Muslim population of Delhi, including his royal family, the nobles, Sayyids, Sheikhs and Ulama to settle in Daulatabad. The purpose of transferring the entire Muslim elite to Daulatabad was to enrol them in his mission of world conquest. He saw their role as propagandists who would adapt Islamic religious symbolism to the rhetoric of empire, and that the Sufis could by persuasion bring many of the inhabitants of the Deccan to become Muslim. Tughluq cruelly punished the nobles who were unwilling to move to Daulatabad seeing their non-compliance with his order as equivalent to rebellion. According to Ferishta, when the Mongols arrived in Punjab, the Sultan returned the elite to Delhi, although Daulatabad remained an administrative centre. One result of the transfer of the elite to Daulatabad was the hatred of the nobility to the Sultan, which remained in their minds for a long time. The other result was that he managed to create a stable Muslim elite, resulting in the growth of the Muslim population of Daulatabad, who did not return to Delhi, without which the rise of the Bahmanid kingdom to challenge the Vijayanagara kingdom would not have been possible. Muhammad bin Tughlaq's adventures in the Deccan region also marked campaigns of destruction and desecration temples, for example, the Svayambhu Shiva Temple and the Thousand Pillar Temple in Warangal.

Revolts against Muhammad bin Tughlaq began in 1327, continued over his reign, and over time the geographical reach of the Sultanate shrank. The Vijayanagara Empire originated in southern India as a direct response to attacks from the Delhi Sultanate, and liberated south India from the Delhi Sultanate's rule. In the 1330s, Muhammad bin Tughlaq ordered an invasion of China, sending part of his forces over the Himalayas. However, they were defeated by the Kangra State. During his reign, state revenues collapsed due to his policies, such as the base metal coins from 1329 to 1332. Famines, widespread poverty, and rebellion grew across the kingdom. In 1338, his nephew rebelled in Malwa, whom he attacked, caught, flayed alive, and killed ultimately. By 1339, the eastern regions under local Muslim governors and southern parts led by Hindu kings had revolted and declared independence from the Delhi Sultanate. Muhammad bin Tughlaq did not have the resources or support to respond to the shrinking kingdom. The historian Walford chronicled that Delhi and most of India faced severe famines during Muhammad bin Tughlaq's rule in the years after the base metal coin experiment. In 1335, Jalaluddin Ahsan Khan, a Sayyid from Kaithal in northern India, revolted and founded the Madurai Sultanate in southern India. By 1347, the Bahmani Sultanate had become independent through the rebellion of Ismail Mukh. It became a competing Muslim kingdom in the Deccan region of South Asia, founded by Ala-ud-Din Bahman Shah.

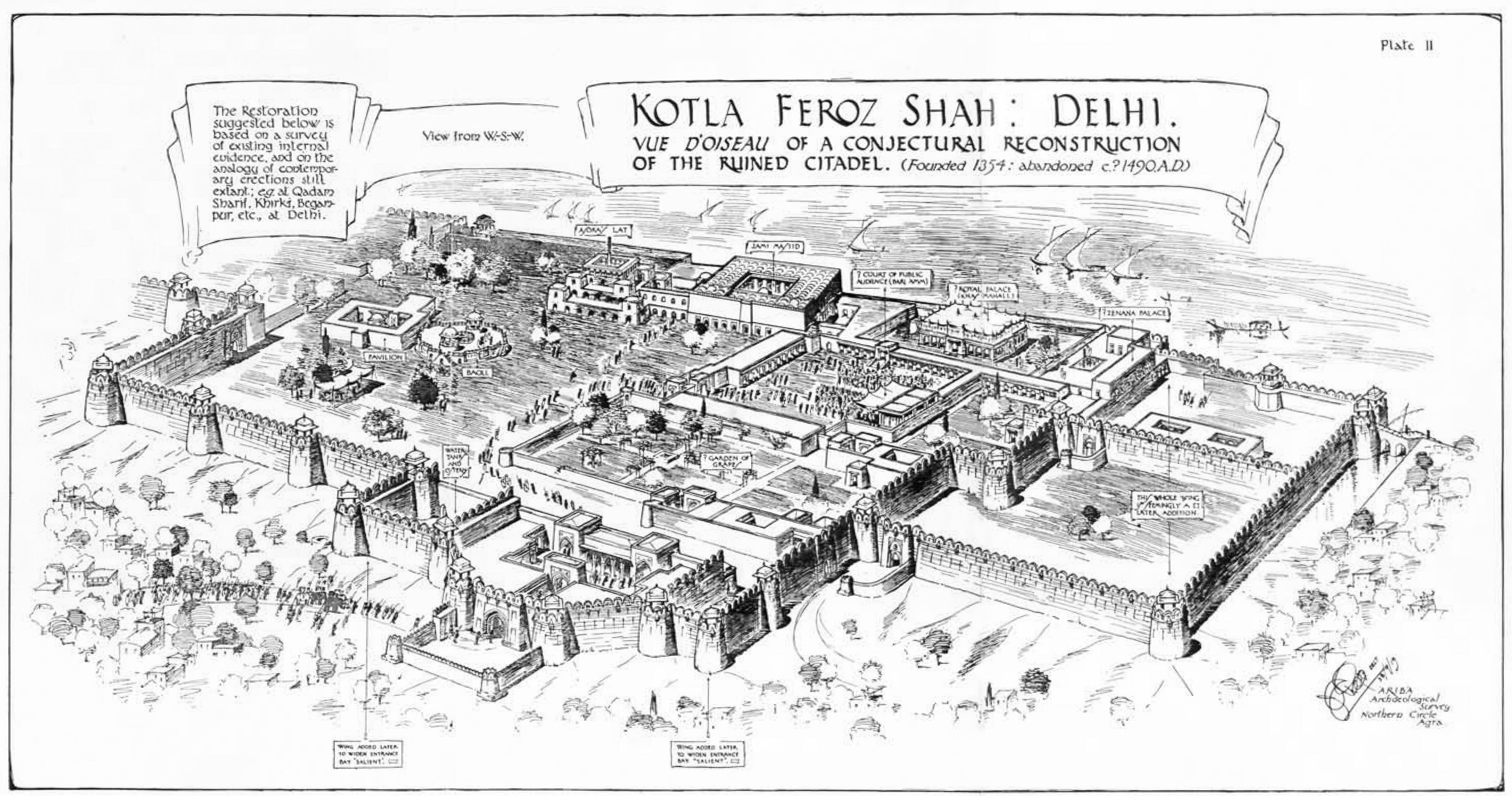
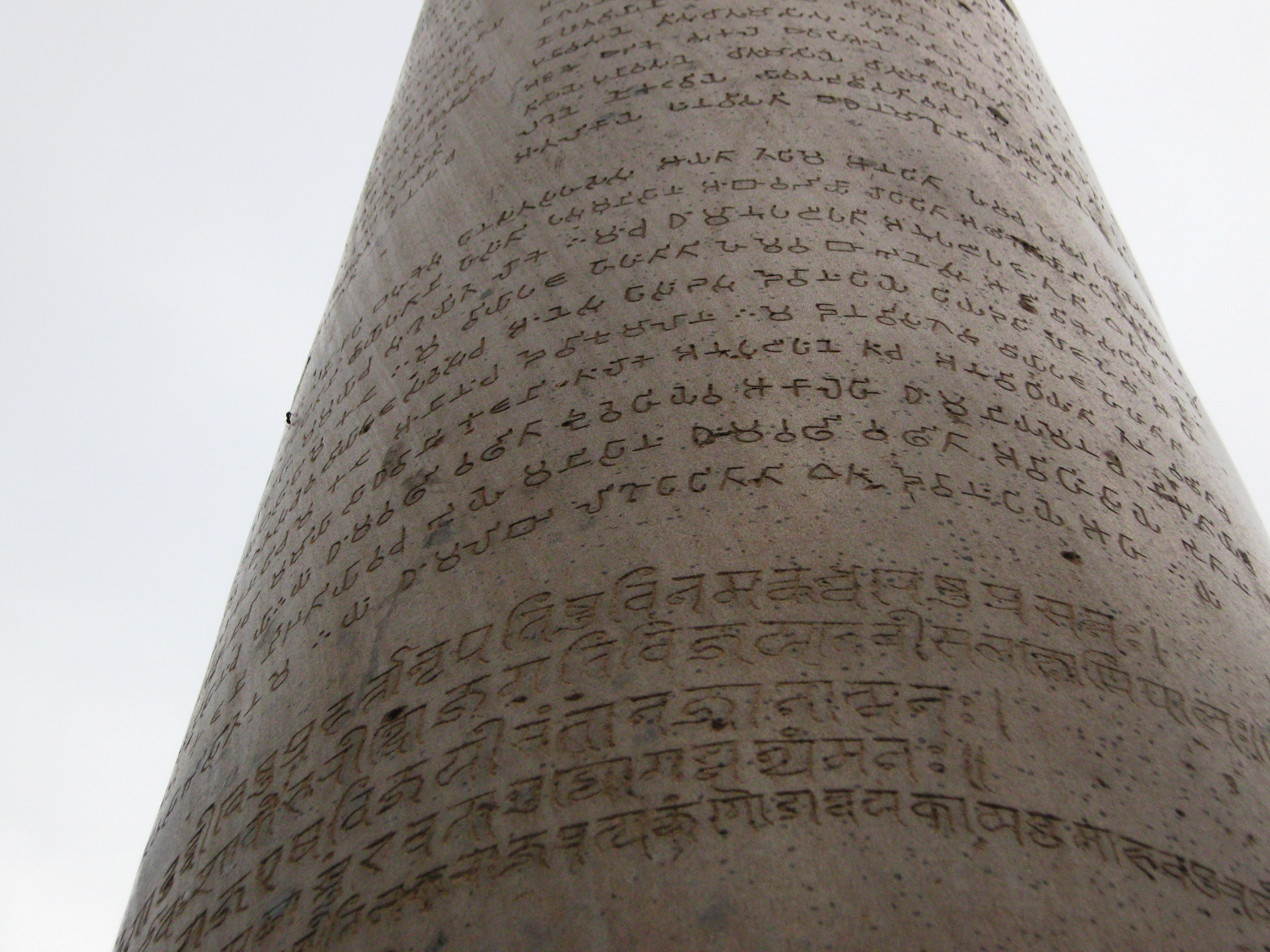
The Tughlaq dynasty is remembered for its architectural patronage, such as the construction of Firoz Shah Kotla. It reused old Buddhist pillars erected by Ashoka in the 3rd century BCE, such as the Delhi-Topra pillar. The Sultanate initially wanted to use the pillars as minarets. Firuz Shah Tughlaq decided otherwise and had them installed near mosques. The meaning of the Brahmi script on the pillars (the Edicts of Ashoka) was unknown in Firuz Shah's time.

Muhammad bin Tughlaq died in 1351 while trying to chase and punish people in Gujarat who were rebelling against the Delhi Sultanate. He was succeeded by Firuz Shah Tughlaq (1351–1388), who tried to regain the old kingdom, boundary by waging a war with Bengal for 11 months in 1359. However, Bengal did not fall. Firuz Shah ruled for 37 years. His reign was marked with prosperity much of which was due to the wise and capable grand vizier, Khan-i-Jahan Maqbul, an Indian Telugu Muslim. His reign attempted to stabilise the food supply and reduce famines by commissioning an irrigation canal from the Yamuna| river. An educated sultan, Firuz Shah, left a memoir. In it he wrote that he banned the practice of torture, such as amputations, tearing out of eyes, sawing people alive, crushing people's bones as punishment, pouring molten lead into throats, setting people on fire, driving nails into hands and feet, among others. He also wrote that he did not tolerate attempts by Rafida Shi'a Muslim and Mahdi sects from proselytizing people into their faith, nor did he tolerate Hindus who tried to rebuild temples that his armies had destroyed. Firuz Shah Tughlaq also lists his accomplishments to include converting Hindus to Sunni Islam by announcing an exemption from taxes and jizya for those who convert, and by lavishing new converts with presents and honours. He also vastly expanded the number of slaves in his service and those of Muslim nobles, who were converted to Islam, taught to read and memorize the Qur'an, and employed in many offices especially in the military, out of which he was able to amass a large army. These slaves were known as the Ghulaman-i-Firuz Shahi formed an elite guard which later became influential in the state. The reign of Firuz Shah Tughlaq was marked by reduction in extreme forms of torture, elimination of favours to select parts of society, but also increased intolerance and persecution of targeted groups, the latter of which resulting in conversion of significant parts of the population to Islam.

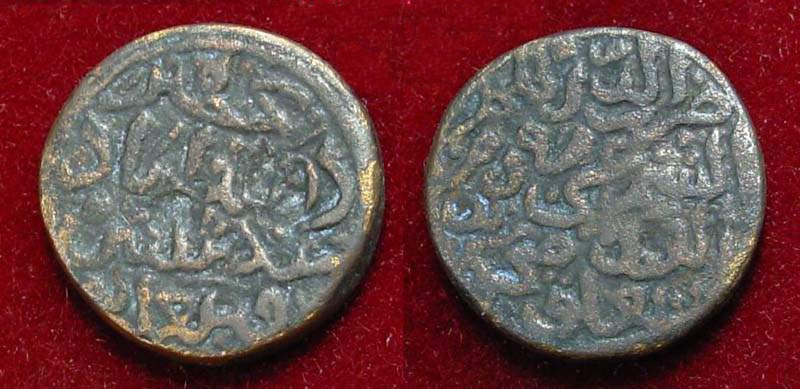
A base metal coin of Muhammad bin Tughlaq that led to an economic collapse.

The death of Firuz Shah Tughlaq created anarchy and the disintegration of the kingdom. Firuz Shah's successor, his great-grandson, Ghiyath-ud-Din Shah II was young and inexperienced and gave himself up to wine and pleasure. The nobles rose against him, killed the Sultan and his vizier, and installed a grandson of Firuz, Abu Bakr Shah on the throne. However, the old Ghulaman-i-Firuz Shahi turned against Abu Bakr, who fled, and on their invitation Nasir-ud-Din Muhammad Shah was installed on the throne. The anomalous institution of the Ghulaman-i-Firuz Shahi became a corrupting influence on the successive Sultans following Firuz Shah. The last rulers of this dynasty both called themselves Sultan from 1394 to 1397: Mahmud Shah Tughluq, the grandson of Firuz Shah Tughlaq who ruled from Delhi, and Nusrat Shah Tughluq, brother of Tughluq Khan and another great-grandson of Firuz who ruled from Firozabad, which was a few miles from Delhi. The battle between the two relatives continued until Timur's invasion in 1398. Timur, also known as Tamerlane in Western scholarly literature, was the Turko-Mongol ruler of the Timurid Empire. He became aware of the weakness and quarrelling of the rulers of the Delhi Sultanate, so he marched with his army to Delhi, plundering and killing all the way. Estimates for the massacre by Timur in Delhi range from 100,000 to 200,000 people. Timur had no intention of staying in or ruling India. He looted the lands he crossed, then plundered and burnt Delhi. Over fifteen days, Timur and his army raged a massacre. Then he collected wealth, captured women and men and children, and enslaved people (particularly skilled artisans), and returning with this loot to Samarkand. The people and lands within the Delhi Sultanate were left in a state of anarchy, chaos, and pestilence. Nasir ud-Din Mahmud Shah Tughlaq, who had fled to Gujarat during Timur's invasion, returned and nominally ruled as the last ruler of the Tughlaq dynasty, as a puppet of the various factions at the court. Next years were marked by a series of successions of provinces from the Delhi Sultanate: Gujarat, Malwa, and Jaunpur.

==== Sayyid dynasty (1414–1450) ====
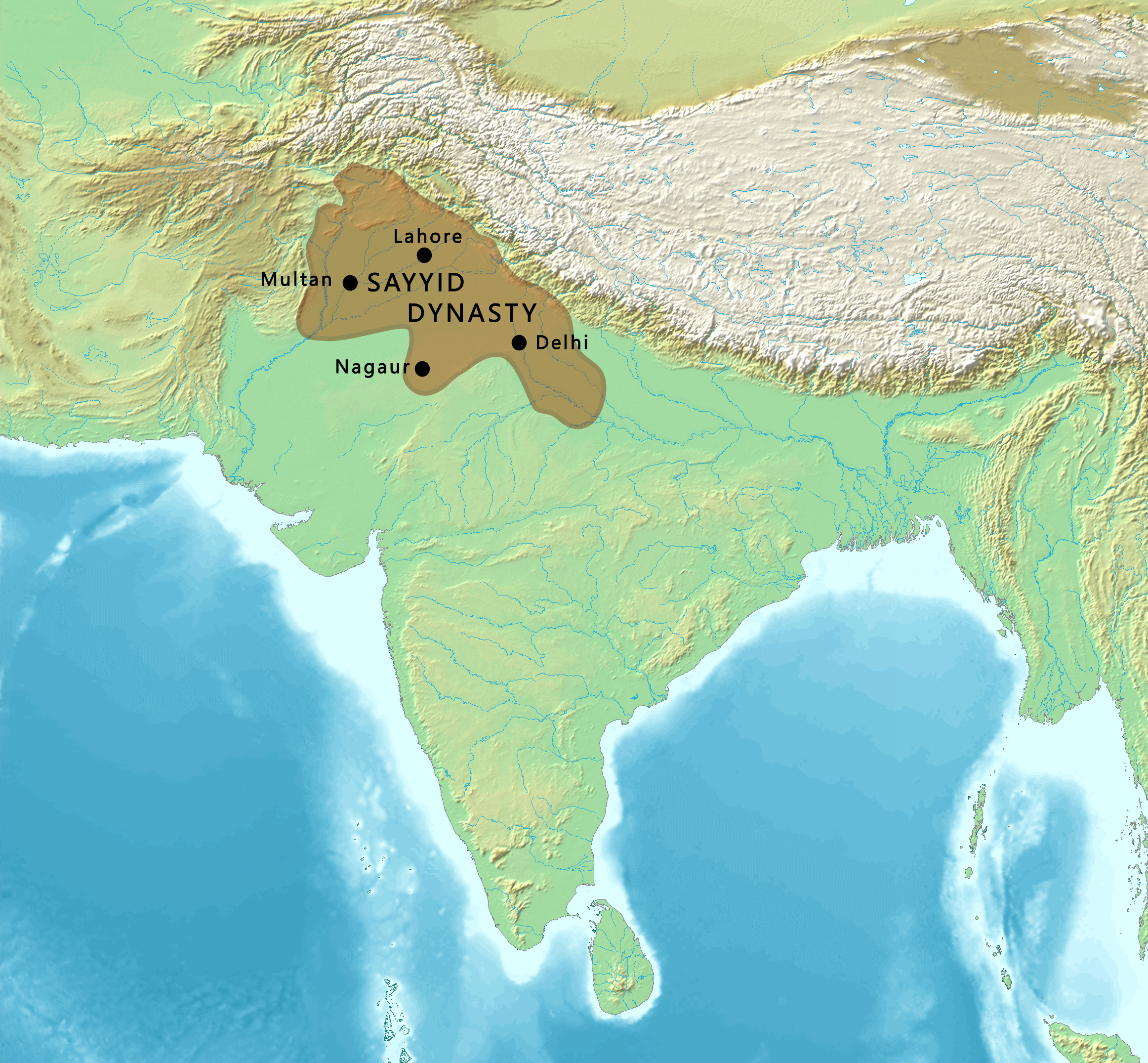
Territories of the Sayyid dynasty.

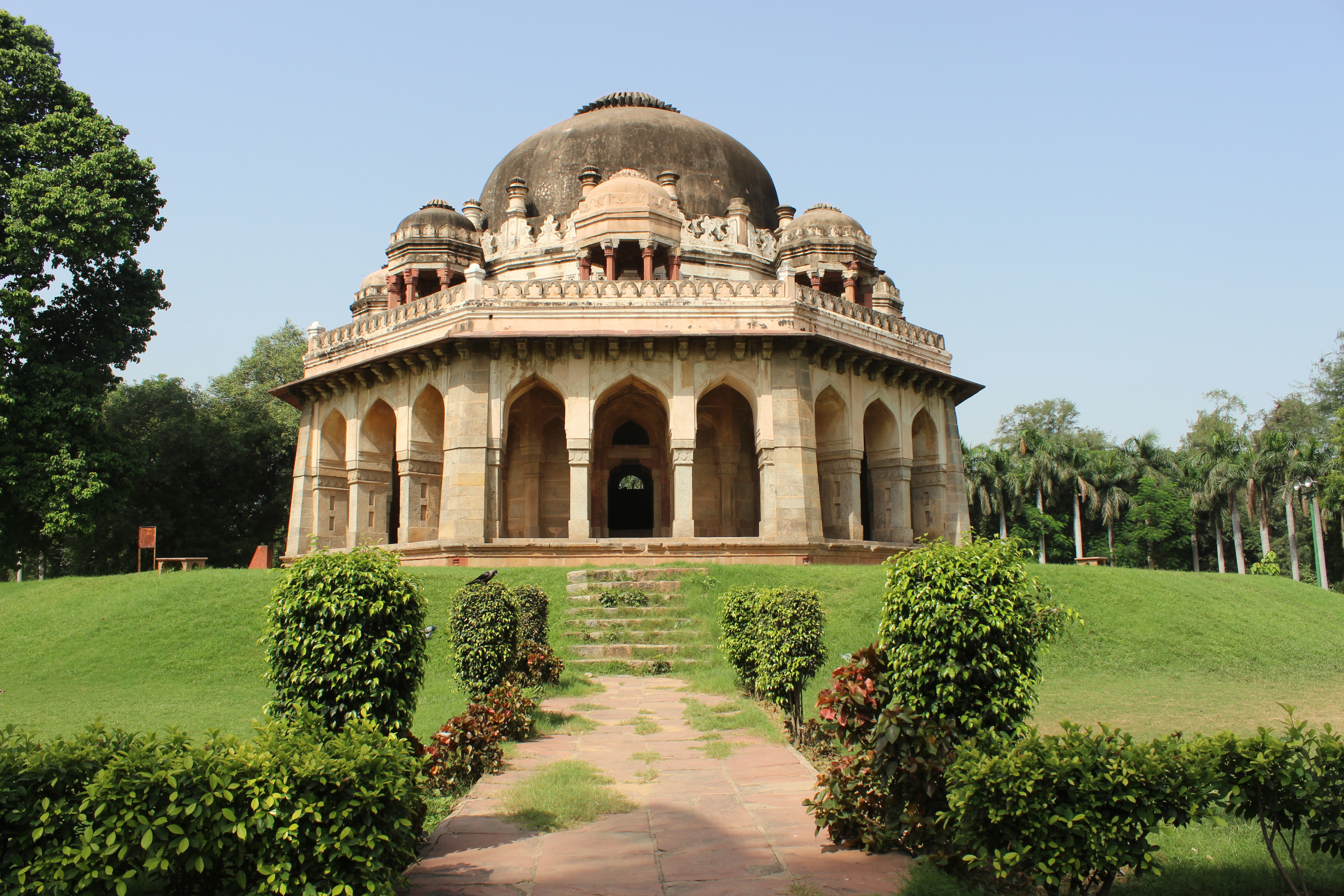
The tomb of Muhammad Shah at Lodi Gardens, New Delhi.

The Sayyid dynasty was founded by Khizr Khan and it ruled the Delhi Sultanate from 1415 to 1451. Members of the dynasty derived their title, Sayyid, or the descendants of the Islamic prophet, Muhammad, based on the claim that they belonged to his lineage through his daughter Fatima. Modern historians consider their claim of sayyid descent doubtful, although several scholars suggest him to have descended from an Arab family long settled in Multan, while according to Richard M. Eaton and Simon Digby, Khizr Khan was a Punjabi chieftain from Khokhar clan.

The Timurid invasion and plunder had left the Delhi Sultanate in shambles, and little is known about the rule by the Sayyid dynasty. Annemarie Schimmel notes the first ruler of the dynasty as Khizr Khan, who assumed power as a vassal of the Timurid Empire. His successor was Mubarak Khan, who renamed himself Mubarak Shah, discontinued his father's nominal allegiance to Timur and unsuccessfully tried to regain lost territories in Punjab from Khokhar warlords.

With the power of the Sayyid dynasty faltering, Islam's history on the Indian subcontinent underwent a profound change, according to Schimmel. The previously dominant Sunni sect of Islam became diluted, alternate Muslim sects such as the Shi'a rose, and new competing centres of Islamic culture took root beyond Delhi.

In the course of the late Sayyid dynasty, the Delhi Sultanate shrank until it became a minor power. By the time of the last Sayyid ruler, Alam Shah (whose name translated to "king of the world"), this resulted in a common northern Indian witticism, according to which the "kingdom of the king of the world extends from Delhi to Palam", i.e. merely 13 kilometres (8.1 mi). Historian Richard M. Eaton noted that this saying showcased how the "once-mighty empire had become a joke". The Sayyid dynasty was displaced by the Lodi dynasty in 1451, however, resulting in a resurgence of the Delhi Sultanate.

==== Lodi dynasty (1451–1526) ====
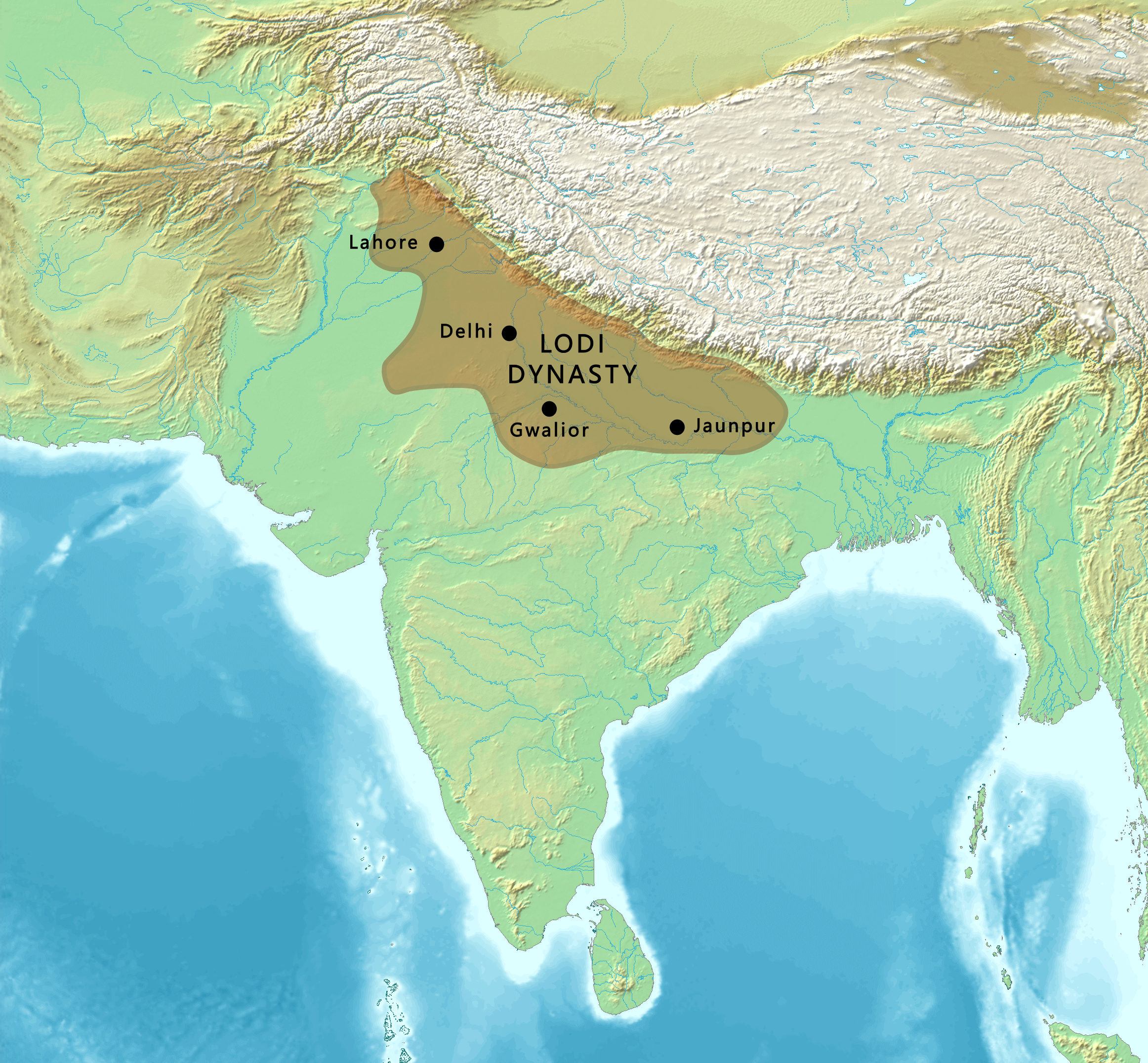
Territory of the Lodi Sultanate (1451–1526).

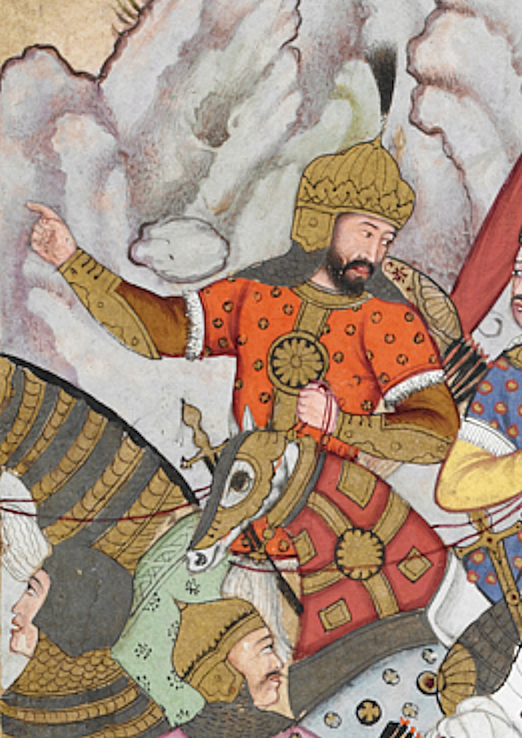
Ibrahim Lodi, last Sultan of the Lodi dynasty, at the Battle of Panipat (1526) against Babur, Baburnama c. 1590

The Lodi dynasty was an Afghan or Turco-Afghan dynasty, (Note: Herbert Hartel calls the Lodi sultans Turco-Afghan: "The Turco-Afghan sultans of the Lodi Dynasty...".) related to the Pashtun (Afghan) Lodi tribe. The founder of the dynasty, Bahlul Khan Lodi, was a Khalji of the Lodi clan. He started his reign by attacking the Muslim Jaunpur Sultanate to expand the influence of the Delhi Sultanate and was partially successful through a treaty. Thereafter, the region from Delhi to Varanasi (then at the border of Bengal province), was back under the influence of the Delhi Sultanate.

After Bahlul Lodi died, his son Nizam Khan assumed power, renamed himself Sikandar Lodi and ruled from 1489 to 1517. One of the better-known rulers of the dynasty, Sikandar Lodi expelled his brother Barbak Shah from Jaunpur, installed his son Jalal Khan as the ruler, then proceeded east to make claims on Bihar. The Muslim governors of Bihar agreed to pay tribute and taxes but operated independently of the Delhi Sultanate. Sikandar Lodi led a campaign of destruction of temples, particularly around Mathura. He also moved his capital and court from Delhi to Agra. Sikandar thus erected buildings with Indo-Islamic architecture in Agra during his rule, and the growth of Agra continued during the Mughal Empire, after the end of the Delhi Sultanate.

Sikandar Lodi died a natural death in 1517, and his second son Ibrahim Lodi assumed power. Ibrahim did not enjoy the support of Afghan and Persian nobles or regional chiefs. He attacked and killed his elder brother Jalal Khan, who was installed as the governor of Jaunpur by his father and had the support of the amirs and chiefs. Ibrahim Lodi was unable to consolidate his power, and after Jalal Khan's death, the governor of Lahore, Daulat Khan Lodi, reached out to the Mughal Babur and invited him to attack the Delhi Sultanate. Babur defeated and killed Ibrahim Lodi in the battle of Panipat in 1526. The death of Ibrahim Lodi ended the Delhi Sultanate, and the Mughal Empire replaced it.

== Government and politics ==
The historian Peter Jackson explains in The New Cambridge History of Islam: "The elite of the early Delhi sultanate comprised overwhelmingly first-generation immigrants from Iran and Central Asia: Persians, Turks, Ghūrīs, Khalaj from the hot regions (garmsīr) of modern Afghanistan".

=== Political system ===
Medieval scholars such as Abdul Malik Isami and Ziauddin Barani suggested that the prehistory of the Delhi Sultanate lay in the Ghaznavid state and that its ruler, Mahmud Ghaznavi, provided the foundation and inspiration integral to the making of the Delhi regime. The Mongol and Hindu monarchies were the great "Others" in these narratives and the Persianate and class-conscious, aristocratic virtues of the ideal state were creatively memorialised in the Ghaznavid state, now the templates for the Delhi Sultanate. Cast within a historical narrative, it allowed for a more self-reflective, linear rooting of the sultanate in the great traditions of Muslim statecraft. Over time, successive Muslim dynasties created a "centralized structure in the Persian tradition whose task was to mobilize human and material resources for the ongoing armed struggle against both Mongol and Hindu monarchies". The monarch was not the Sultan of the Hindus or of, say, the people of Haryana, rather in the eyes of the sultanate's chroniclers, the Muslims constituted what in more recent times would be termed a "Staatsvolk". For many Muslim observers, the ultimate justification for any ruler within the Islamic world was the protection and advancement of the faith. For the sultans, as for their Ghaznavid and Ghurid predecessors, this entailed the suppression of heterodox Muslims, and Firuz Shah attached some importance to the fact that he had acted against the ashab-i had-u ibadat (deviators and latitudinarians). It also involved plundering and extorting tribute from independent Hindu principalities. Firuz Shah, who believed that India was changed into a Muslim nation, declared that "no zimmi living in a Musalman country might dare to act".

The Hindu kingdoms who submitted to Islamic rule qualified as "protected peoples" according to the wide spectrum of the educated Muslim community within the subcontinent. The balance of the evidence is that in the latter half of the fourteenth century, if not before, the jizyah was levied as a discriminatory tax on non-Muslims, although even then it is difficult to see how such a measure could have been enforced outside the principal centres of Muslim authority. The Delhi Sultanate also continued the governmental conventions of the previous Hindu polities, claiming paramountcy of some of its subjects rather than exclusive supreme control. Accordingly, it did not interfere with the autonomy and military of certain conquered Hindu rulers and freely included Hindu vassals and officials.

=== Economic policy and administration ===
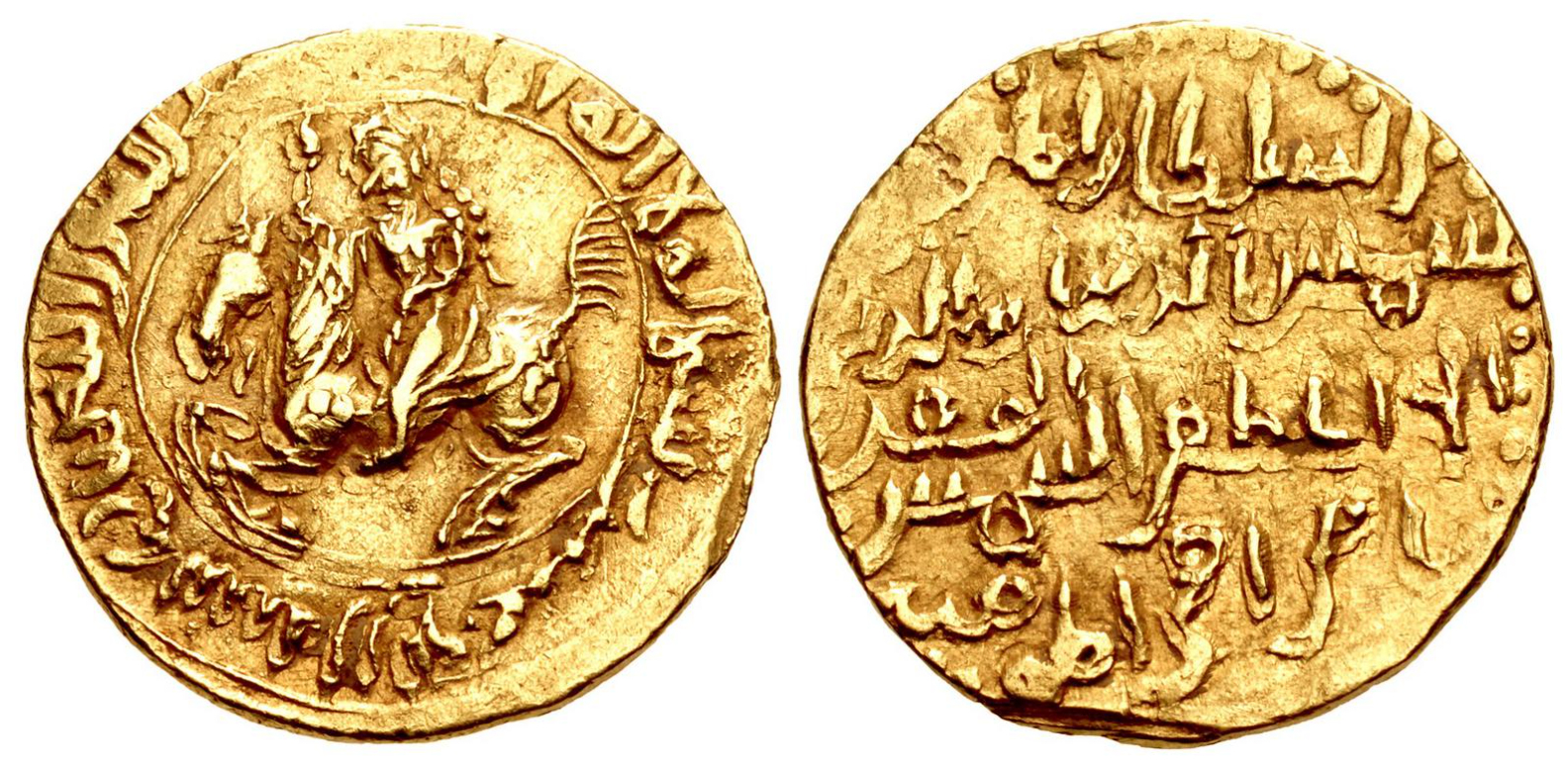
Coin of Ghiyath al-Din 'Iwad, Governor of Bengal, AH 614–616 AD 1217–1220. Struck in the name of Shams al-Din Iltutmish, Sultan of Dehli.

The economic policy of the Delhi Sultanate was characterised by greater government involvement in the economy relative to the Classical Hindu dynasties, and increased penalties for private businesses that broke government regulations. Alauddin Khalji replaced the private markets with four centralized government-run markets, appointed a "market controller", and implemented strict price controls on all kinds of goods, "from caps to socks; from combs to pins; from vegetables to soups, from sweetmeats to chapatis" (according to Ziauddin Barani [c. 1357]). The price controls were inflexible even during droughts. Capitalist investors were completely banned from participating in the horse trade, animal and slave brokers were forbidden from collecting commissions, and private merchants were eliminated from all animal and slave markets. Bans were instituted against hoarding and regrating, granaries were nationalised and limits were placed on the amount of grain that could be used by cultivators for personal use.

Various licensing rules were imposed. Registration of merchants was required, and expensive goods such as certain fabrics were deemed "unnecessary" for the general public and required a permit from the state to be purchased. These licenses were issued to amirs, maliks, and other important persons in government. Agricultural taxes were raised to 50%.

Traders regarded the regulations as burdensome, and violations were severely punished, leading to further resentment among the traders. A network of spies was instituted to ensure the implementation of the system; even after price controls were lifted after Khalji's death, Barani claims that the fear of his spies remained and that people continued to avoid trading in expensive commodities.

=== Social policies ===
Under the Hanafi school of jurisprudence followed by the Delhi Sultanate, non-Muslim subjects—predominantly Hindus, Jains, Buddhists, and Sikhs—were classified as dhimmis (non-Muslims living in an Islamic state) and required to pay the Jizya (tax) in exchange for protection and permission to practice their faith. While Sultanate administration relied routinely on Hindu subordinate elites, such as rawats and patwaris for rural revenue collection, orthodox chroniclers like Ziauddin Barani in his Fatāwā-i Jahāndārī advocated for stricter degradation of non-Muslims and restrictions on the public repair or construction of non-Islamic places of worship. Fairuz Shah Thugluq formally removed the historic exemption on jizya previously extended to Brahmins and suppressed newly constructed local shrines in Delhi.

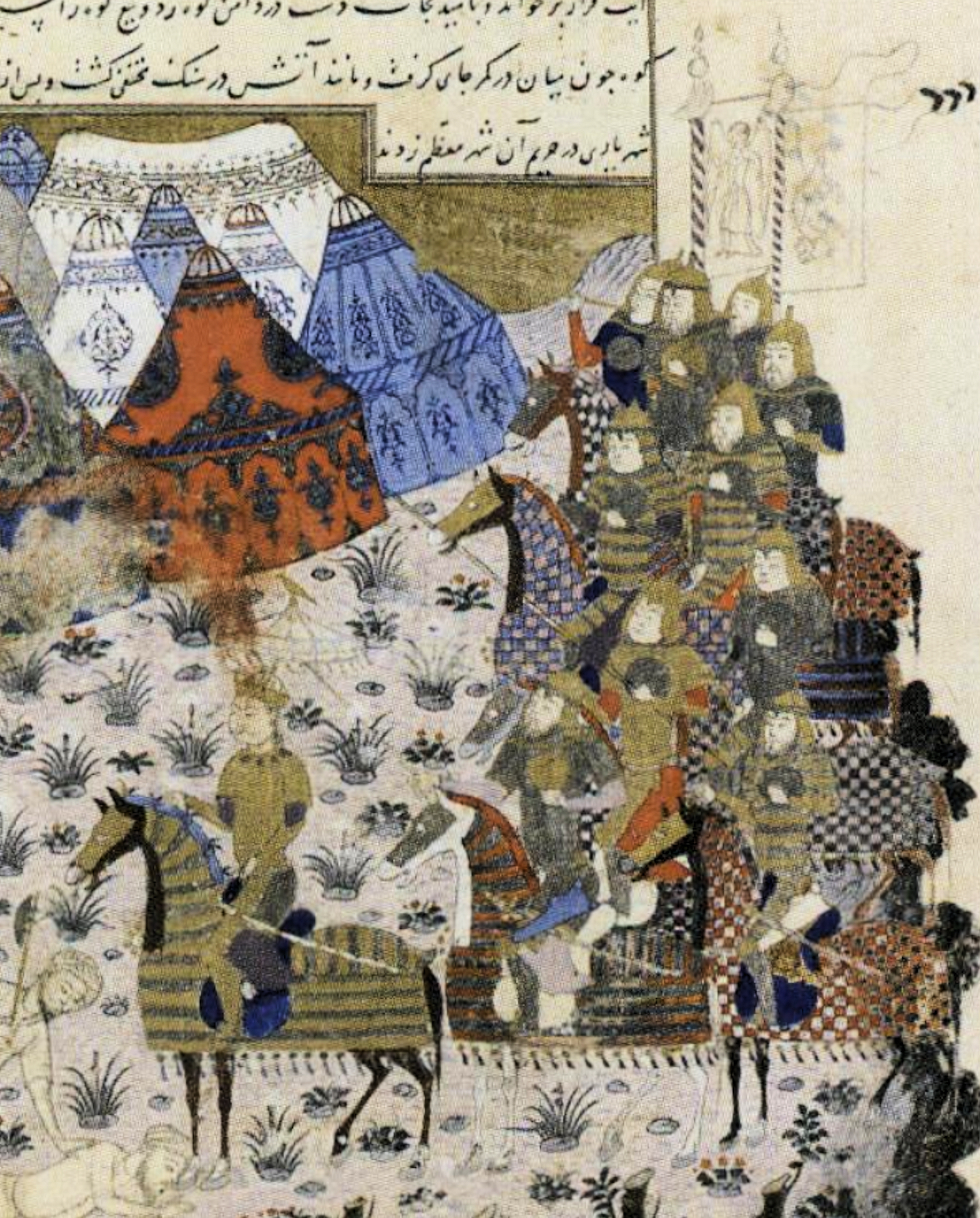
Ghiyath al-Din Tughluq leading his troops in the capture of the city of Tirhut in 1324, from Basātin al-uns by Ikhtisān-i Dabir, a member of the Tughluq court. Ca. 1410 Jalayirid copy of 1326 lost original. Istanbul, Topkapi Palace Museum Library, Ms R. 1032.

=== Military ===
The army of the Delhi sultans initially consisted of nomadic Turkic Mamluk military slaves belonging to Muhammad of Ghor.

The nucleus of this South Asian sultanate military was the Turco-Afghani regular units named Wajih, which were composed of elite household cavalry archers who came from slave backgrounds. A major military contribution of the Delhi Sultanate was their successful campaigns repelling the Mongol Empire's invasions of India, which could have been devastating for the Indian subcontinent, like the Mongol invasions of China, Persia and Europe. Were it not for the Delhi Sultanate, the Mongol Empire may have been successful in invading India.

The strength of the armies changes according to time. Historians state the Delhi sultanate during the Khalji dynasty maintained 300 000 to 400 000 horse cavalry and 2500 to 3000 war elephant as a standing army. Its successor state, the Tughlaq dynasty further expanded into 500 000 horse cavalry in their force.

== Economy ==
The Delhi Sultanate and main other polities circa 1500

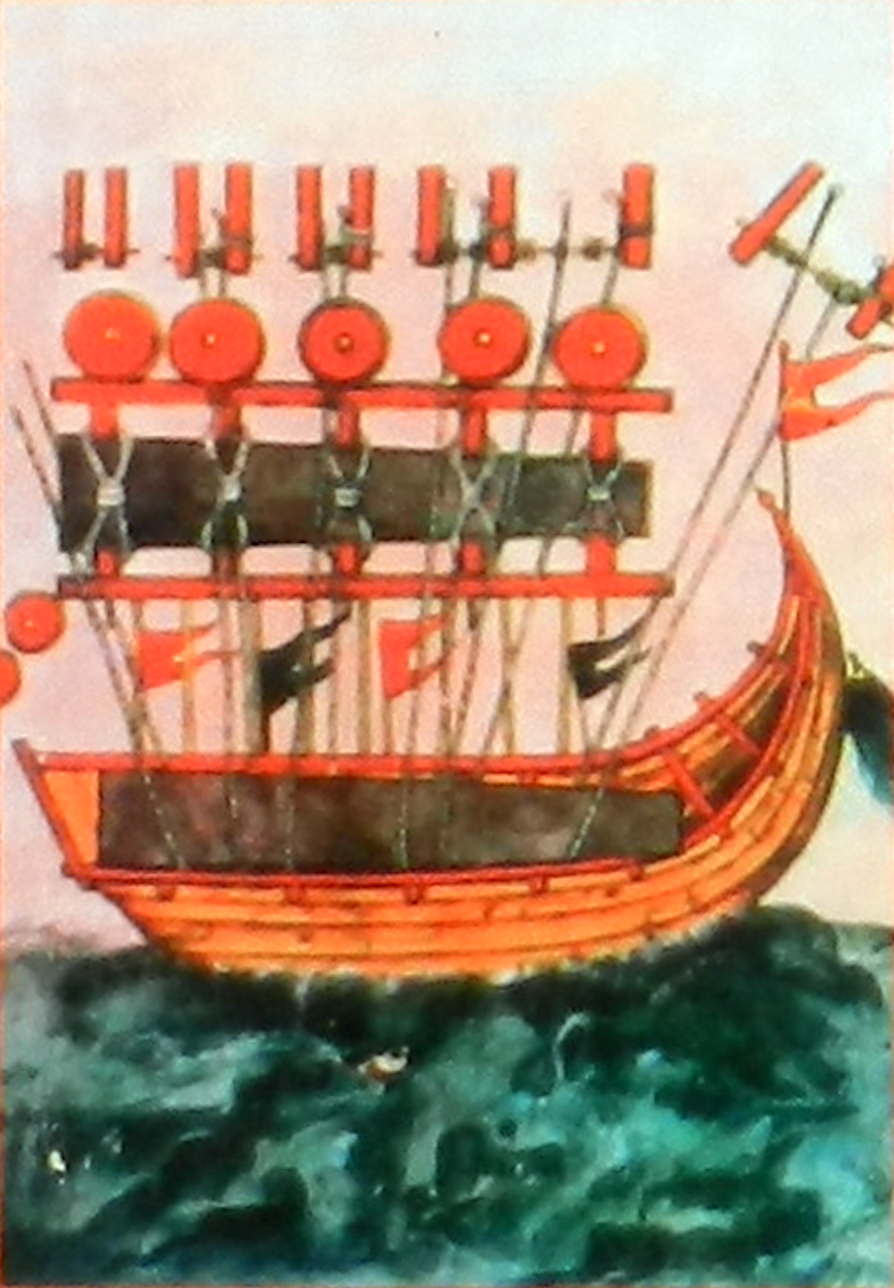
Transportation of the Delhi-Topra pillar to Delhi. Sirat i-Firuz Shahi, 14th century illustration.

Some historians argue that the Delhi Sultanate was responsible for making India more multicultural and cosmopolitan. The establishment of the Delhi Sultanate in India has been compared to the expansion of the Mongol Empire and called "part of a larger trend occurring throughout much of Eurasia, in which nomadic people migrated from the steppes of Inner Asia and became politically dominant".

According to Angus Maddison, between the years 1000 and 1500, India's GDP, of which the sultanates represented a significant part, grew nearly 8% to $60.5 billion in 1500. Though the overall the percentage of the GDP share reduced from 33% to 22% According to Maddison's estimates, India's population grew from 85 million in 1200 to 101 million in 1500.

The Delhi Sultanate period coincided with more use of mechanical technology in the Indian subcontinent. India previously already had highly sophisticated agriculture, food crops, textiles, medicine, minerals, and metals. Water wheels also previously existed in India, as described by various Chinese monks and Arab travellers and writers in their books. (Note: Pali literature dating to the 4th century BC mentions the cakkavattaka, which commentaries explain as arahatta-ghati-yanta (machine with wheel-pots attached), and according to Pacey, water-raising devices were used for irrigation in Ancient India predating their use in the Roman empire or China. Greco-Roman tradition, on the other hand, asserts that the device was introduced to India from the Roman Empire. Furthermore, South Indian mathematician Bhaskara II describes water-wheels c. 1150 in his incorrect proposal for a perpetual motion machine. Srivastava argues that the Sakia, or araghatta was in fact invented in India by the 4th century.) During the Delhi Sultanate, various mechanical devices were introduced from the Islamic world to India, such as geared water-raising wheels and other machines with gears, pulleys, cams, and cranks. Later, Mughal emperor Babur provided a description on the use of water wheels in the Delhi Sultanate.

According to historians Arnold Pacey and Irfan Habib, the spinning wheel was introduced to India from Iran during the Delhi Sultanate. Smith and Cothren suggested that it was invented in India during the latter half of the first millennium, but Pacey and Habib said these early references to cotton spinning do not identify a wheel, but more likely refer to hand spinning. The earliest unambiguous reference to a spinning wheel in India is dated to 1350. The worm gear roller cotton gin was invented in the thirteenth or fourteenth centuries; Habib states that the development may likely occurred in peninsular India, before becoming more widespread across India during the Mughal era. The incorporation of the crank handle in the cotton gin may have appeared sometime during the late Delhi Sultanate or the early Mughal Empire.

India and China have connections throughout thousands of years of history. Paper had already reached some parts of India as early as the 6th or 7th century, initially through Chinese travellers and the ancient silk road which India was very well connected with. Earlier some historians believed that paper failed to catch on as palmyra leaves and birch bark remained far more popular but this theory was discredited later on. On the other hand, the paper may have arrived in Bengal from a separate route, as 15th-century Chinese traveller Ma Huan remarked that Bengali paper was white and made from "bark of a tree" similar to the Chinese method of papermaking (as opposed to the Middle-Eastern method of using rags and waste material), suggesting a direct route from China for the arrival of paper in Bengal and paper was already very well established and widespread in that part of the subcontinent.

== Demographics ==
According to one set of very uncertain estimates by modern historians, the total Indian population had largely been stagnant at 75 million during the Middle Kingdoms era from 1 CE to 1000 CE. During the medieval Delhi Sultanate era from 1000 to 1500, India as a whole experienced lasting population growth for the first time in a thousand years, with its population increasing nearly 50% to 110 million by 1500.

== Culture and Architecture ==
=== Culture ===
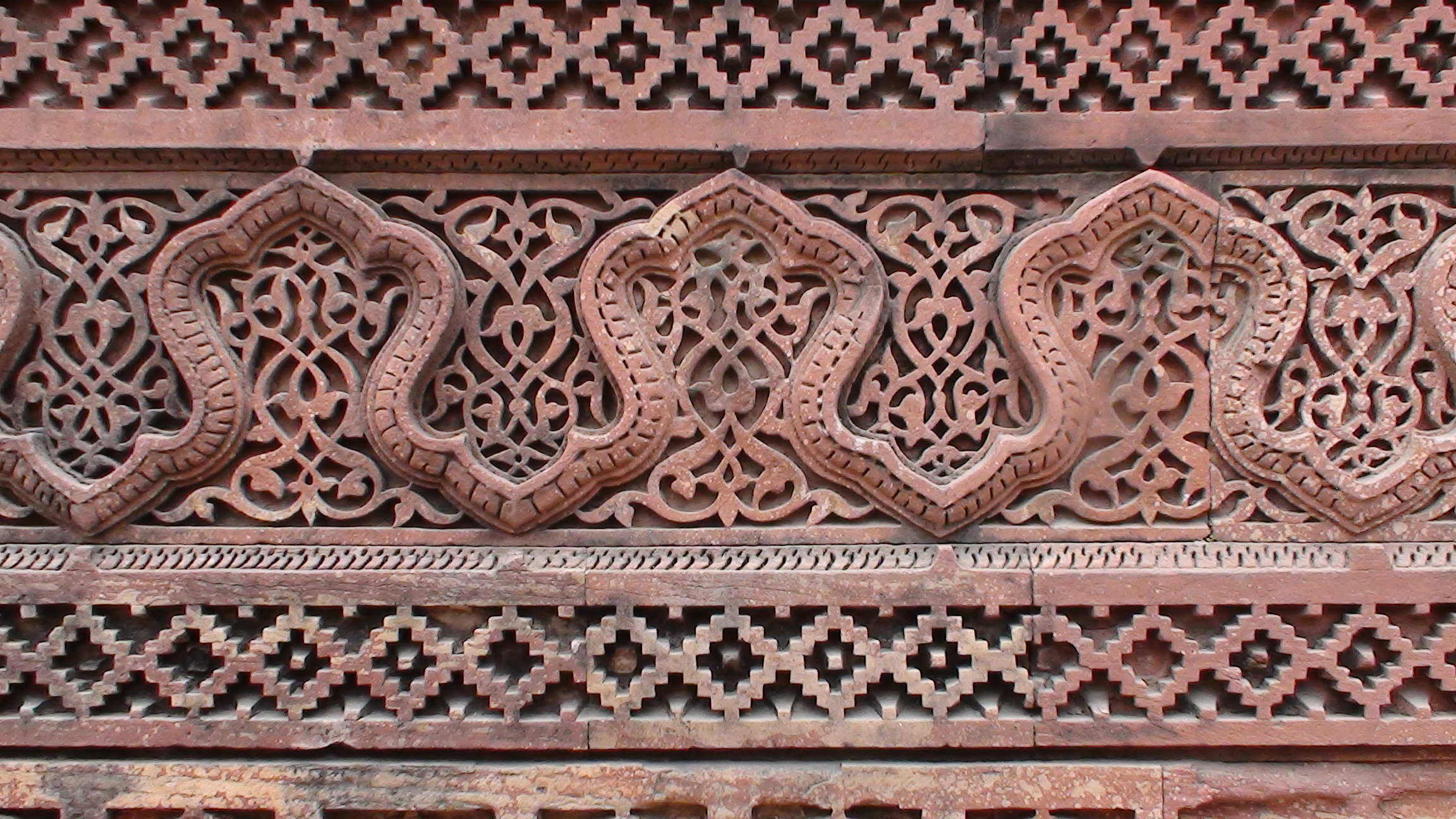
Decorative reliefs, Alai Darwaza, 1311.

While the Indian subcontinent has had invaders from Central Asia since ancient times, what made the Muslim invasions different is that unlike the preceding invaders who assimilated into the prevalent social system, the successful Muslim conquerors retained their Islamic identity and created new legal and administrative systems that challenged and usually in many cases superseded the existing systems of social conduct and ethics, even influencing the non-Muslim rivals and common masses to a large extent, though the non-Muslim population was left to their laws and customs. They also introduced new cultural codes that in some ways were very different from the existing cultural codes. This led to the rise of a new Indian culture that was mixed in nature, different from ancient Indian culture. The overwhelming majority of Muslims in India were Indian natives converted to Islam. This factor also played an important role in the synthesis of cultures.

The Hindustani language (Hindavi) began to emerge in the Delhi Sultanate period, developed from the Middle Indo-Aryan apabhramsha vernaculars of North India. Amir Khusrau, who lived in the 13th century CE during the Delhi Sultanate period in North India, used a form of Hindustani, which was the lingua franca of the period, in his writings and referred to it as Hindavi.

The officers, the Sultans, Khans, Maliks and the soldiers wore the Islamic qabas dress in the style of Khwarezm, which were tucked in the middle of the body, while the turban and kullah were common headwear. The turbans were wrapped around the kullah (caps), and the feet were covered with red boots. The Wazirs and Katibs also dressed like the soldiers, except they did not use belts, and often let down a piece of cloth in front of them in the manner of the Sufis. The judges and the learned men wore ample gowns (farajiyat) and an Arabic garment (durra).

=== Architecture ===
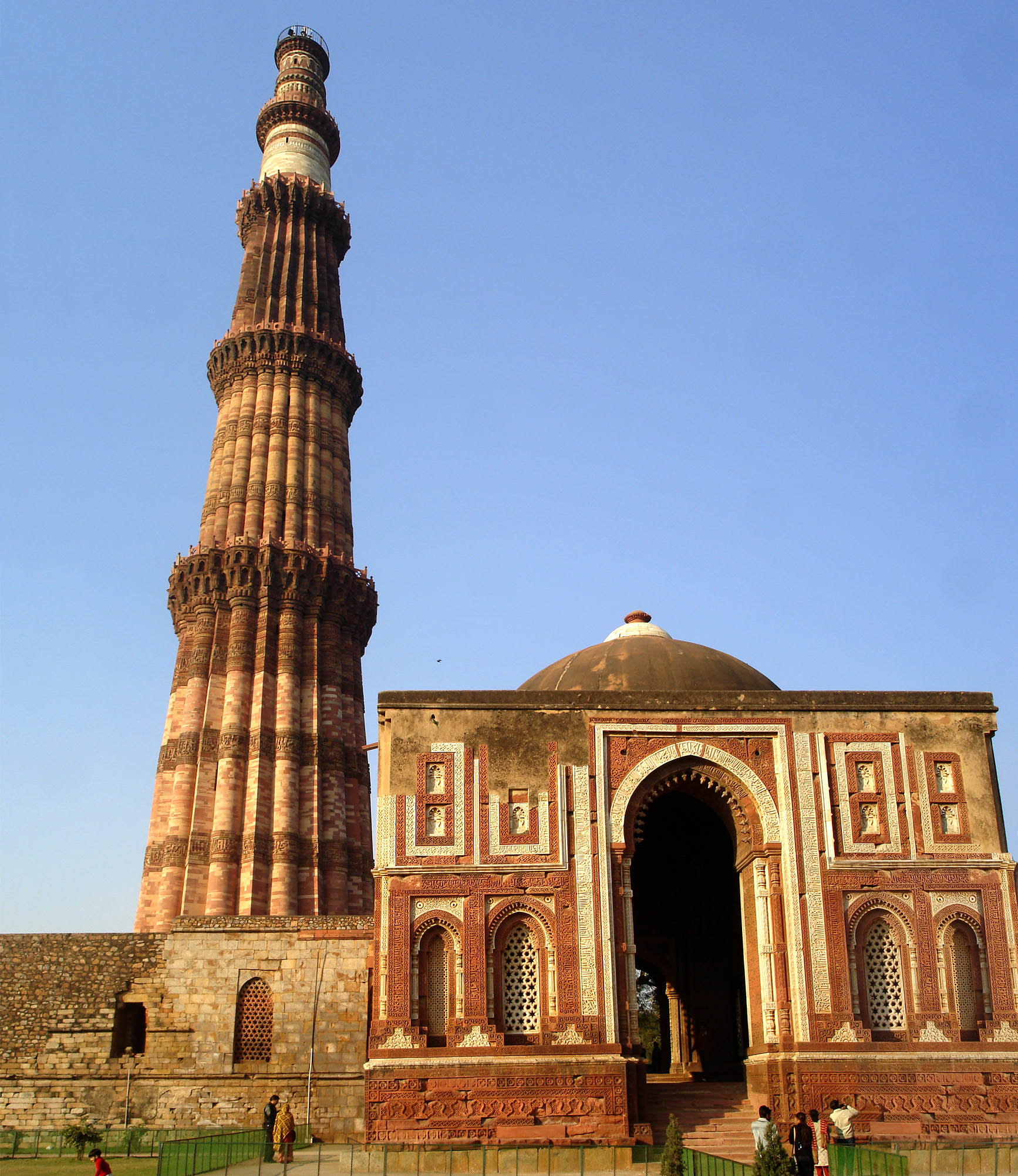
The Qutb Minar (left, begun c. 1200) next to the Alai Darwaza gatehouse (1311); Qutb Minar complex in Delhi.

The establishment of the Delhi Sultanate in 1206 under Qutb ud-Din Aibak introduced a large Islamic state to India, using Central Asian styles. The types and forms of large buildings required by Muslim elites, with mosques and tombs much the most common, were very different from those previously built in India. The exteriors of both were very often topped by large domes and made extensive use of arches. Both of these features were hardly used in Hindu temple architecture and other indigenous Indian styles. Both types of building essentially consist of a single large space under a high dome, and completely avoid the figurative sculpture so important to Hindu temple architecture.

The important Qutb Minar complex in Delhi was begun under Muhammad of Ghor, by 1199, and continued under Qutb ud-Din Aibak and later sultans. The Quwwat-ul-Islam Mosque, now a ruin, was the first structure. Like other early Islamic buildings, it re-used elements such as columns from destroyed Hindu and Jain temples, including one on the same site whose platform was reused. The style was Iranian, but the arches were still corbelled in the traditional Indian way.

Beside it is the extremely tall Qutb Minar, a minaret or victory tower, whose original four stages reach 73 meters (with a final stage added later). Its closest comparator is the 62-metre all-brick Minaret of Jam in Afghanistan, of c. 1190, a decade or so before the probable start of the Delhi tower. (Note: Also two huge minarets at Ghazni.) The surfaces of both are elaborately decorated with inscriptions and geometric patterns; in Delhi, the shaft is fluted with "superb stalactite bracketing under the balconies" at the top of each stage. In general, minarets were slow to be used in India, and are often detached from the main mosque where they exist.

The Tomb of Iltutmish was added by 1236; its dome, the squinches again corbelled, and is now missing, and the intricate carving has been described as having an "angular harshness", from carvers working in an unfamiliar tradition. Other elements were added to the complex over the next two centuries.

Another very early mosque, begun in the 1190s, is the Adhai Din Ka Jhonpra in Ajmer, Rajasthan, built for the same Delhi rulers, again with corbelled arches and domes. Here, Hindu temple columns (and possibly some new ones) are piled up in threes to achieve extra height. Both mosques had large detached screens with pointed corbelled arches added in front of them, probably under Iltutmish a couple of decades later. In these, the central arch is taller, in imitation of an iwan. At Ajmer, the smaller screen arches are tentatively cusped, for the first time in India.

By around 1300, true domes and arches with voussoirs were being built; the ruined Tomb of Balban (d. 1287) in Delhi may be the earliest survival. The Alai Darwaza gatehouse at the Qutb complex, from 1311, still shows a cautious approach to the new technology, with very thick walls and a shallow dome, only visible from a certain distance or height. Bold contrasting colours of masonry, with red sandstone and white marble, introduce what was to become a common feature of Indo-Islamic architecture, substituting for the polychrome tiles used in Persia and Central Asia. The pointed arches come together slightly at their base, giving a mild horseshoe arch effect, and their internal edges are not cusped but lined with conventionalised "spearhead" projections, possibly representing lotus buds. Jali, stone openwork screens, are introduced here; they already had been long used in temples.

==== Tughlaq architecture ====
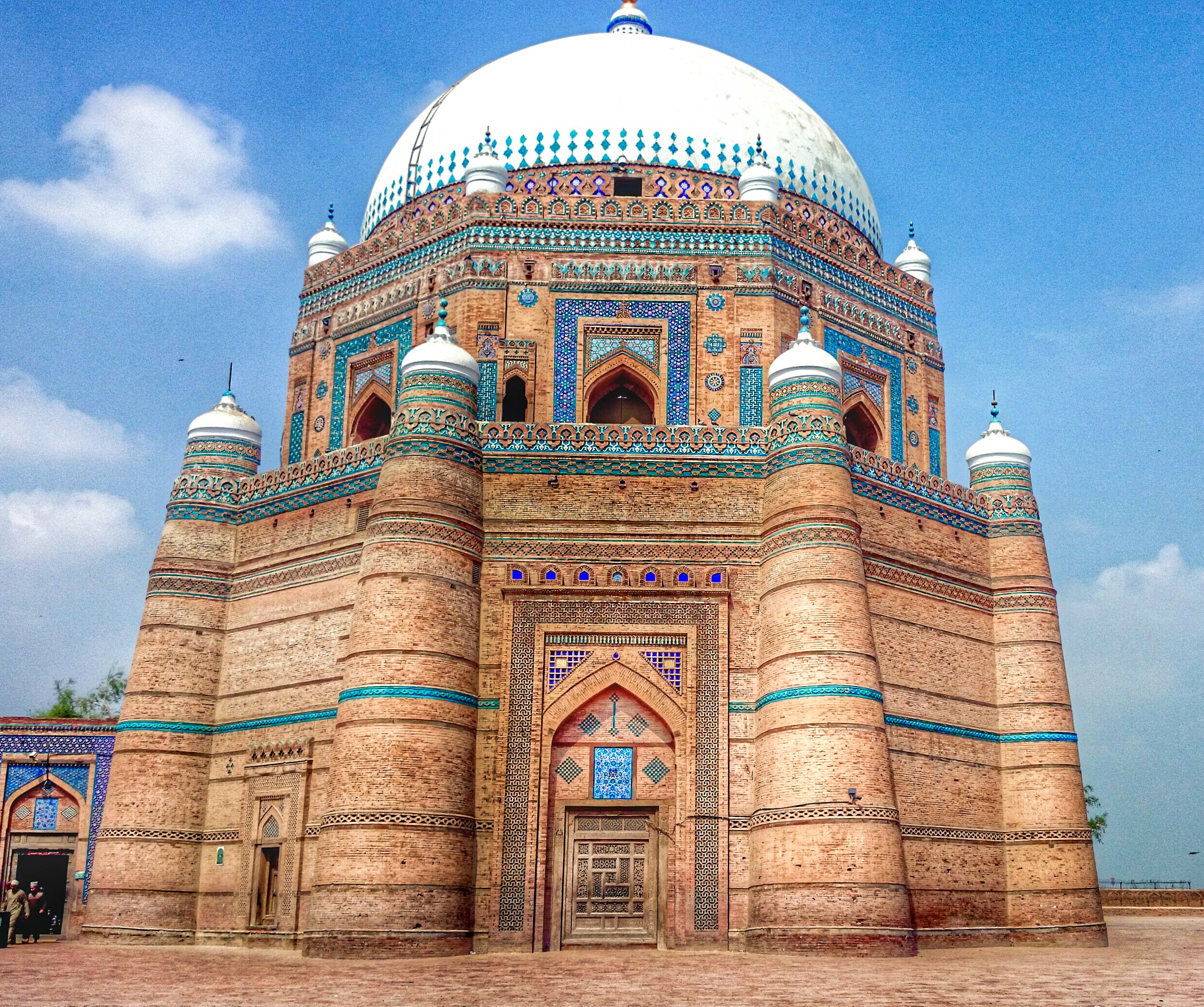
Tomb of Shah Rukn-e-Alam at Multan, built during the reign of Ghiyas-ud-Din Tughluq in 1320

The tomb of Shah Rukn-e-Alam (built 1320 to 1324) in Multan, Pakistan is a large octagonal brick-built mausoleum with polychrome glazed decoration that remains much closer to the styles of Iran and Afghanistan. Timber is also used internally. This was the earliest major monument of the Tughlaq dynasty (1320–1413), built during the unsustainable expansion of its massive territory. It was built for a Sufi saint rather than a sultan, and most of the many Tughlaq tombs are much less exuberant. The tomb of the founder of the dynasty, Ghiyath al-Din Tughluq (d. 1325), is more austere, but impressive; like a Hindu temple, it is topped with a small amalaka and a round finial like a kalasha. Unlike the buildings mentioned previously, it completely lacks carved texts and sits in a compound with high walls and battlements. Both these tombs have external walls sloping slightly inwards, by 25° in the Delhi tomb, like many fortifications including the ruined Tughlaqabad Fort opposite the tomb, intended as the new capital.

The Tughlaqs had a corps of government architects and builders, and in this and other roles employed many Hindus. They left many buildings and a standardised dynastic style. The third sultan, Firuz Shah Tughlaq (r. 1351–1388) is said to have designed buildings himself and was the longest ruler and greatest builder of the dynasty. His Firoz Shah palace complex (started 1354) at Hisar, Haryana is a ruin, but parts are in fair condition. Some buildings from his reign take forms that had been rare or unknown in Islamic buildings. He was buried in the large Hauz Khas Complex in Delhi, with many other buildings from his period and the later Sultanate, including several small domed pavilions supported only by columns.

By this time Islamic architecture in India had adopted some features of earlier Indian architecture, such as the use of a high plinth, and often mouldings around its edges, as well as columns and brackets and hypostyle halls. After the death of Firoz, the Tughlaqs declined, and the following Delhi dynasties were weak. Most of the monumental buildings constructed were tombs, although the impressive Lodi Gardens in Delhi (adorned with fountains, charbagh gardens, ponds, tombs and mosques) were constructed by the late Lodi dynasty. The architecture of other regional Muslim states was often more impressive.

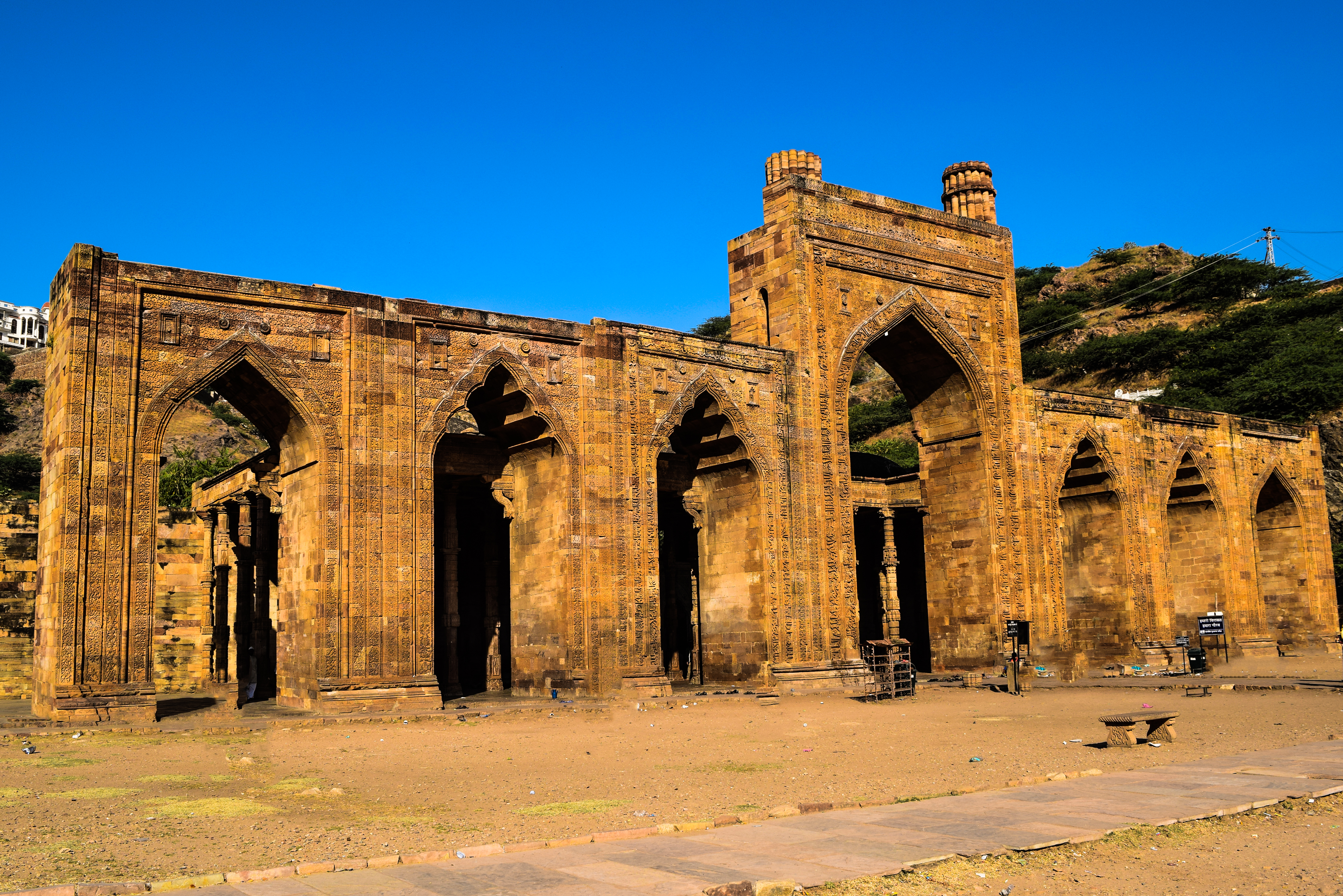
Screen of the Adhai Din Ka Jhonpra mosque, Ajmer, c. 1229; Corbel arches, some cusped.

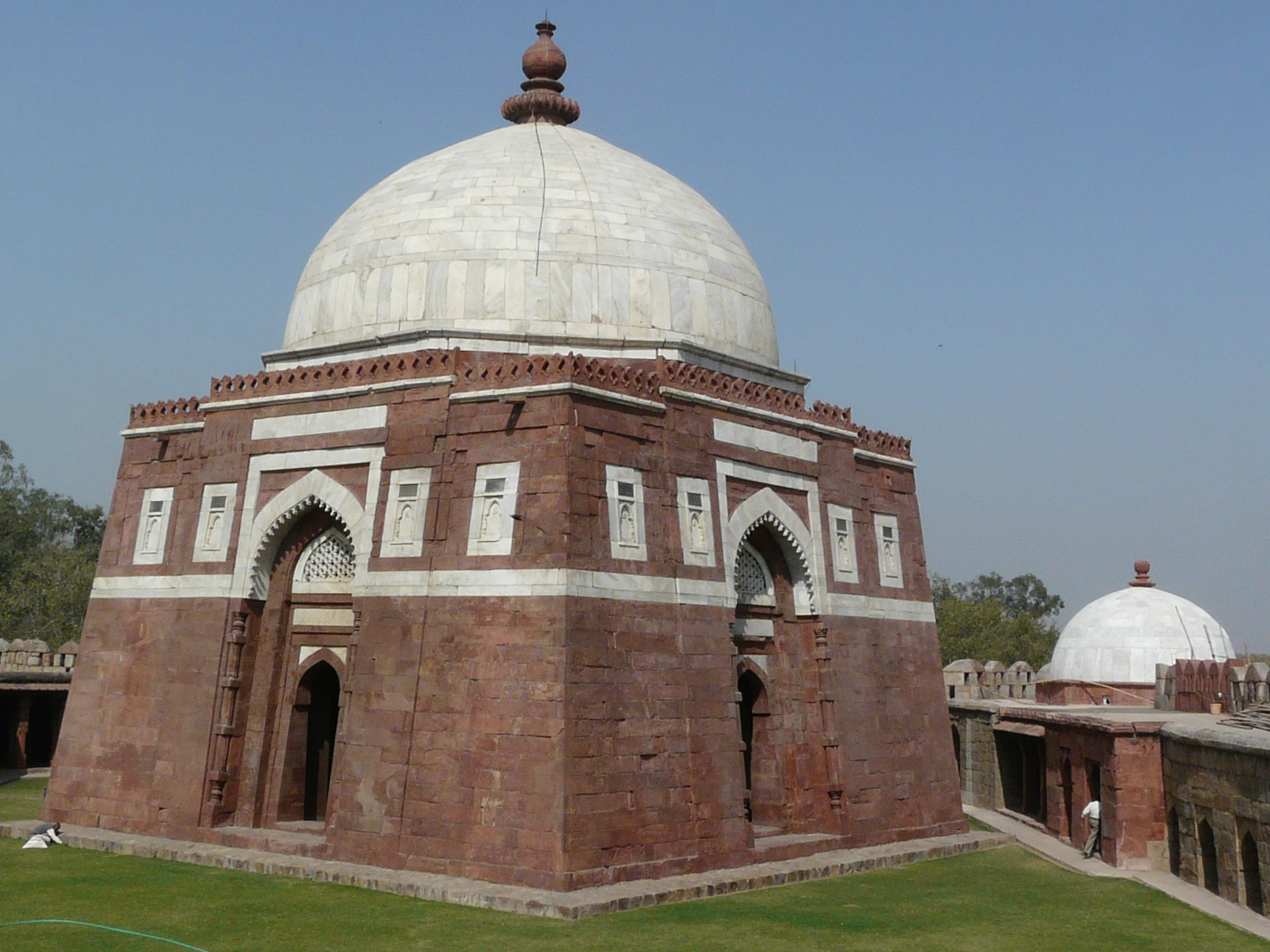
Tomb of Ghiyath al-Din Tughluq (d. 1325), Delhi

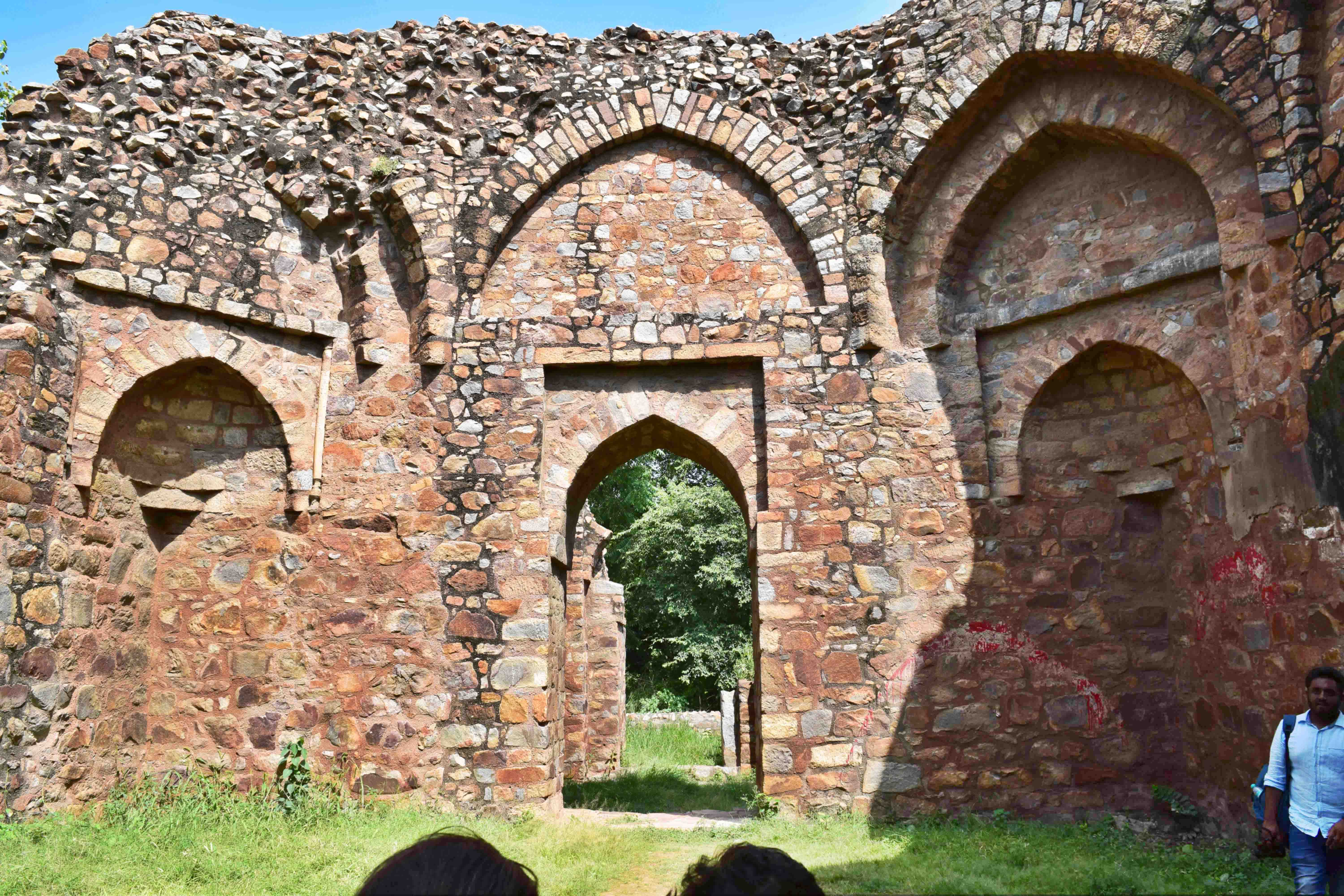
Possibly the first "true" arches in India; Tomb of Balban (d. 1287) in Delhi

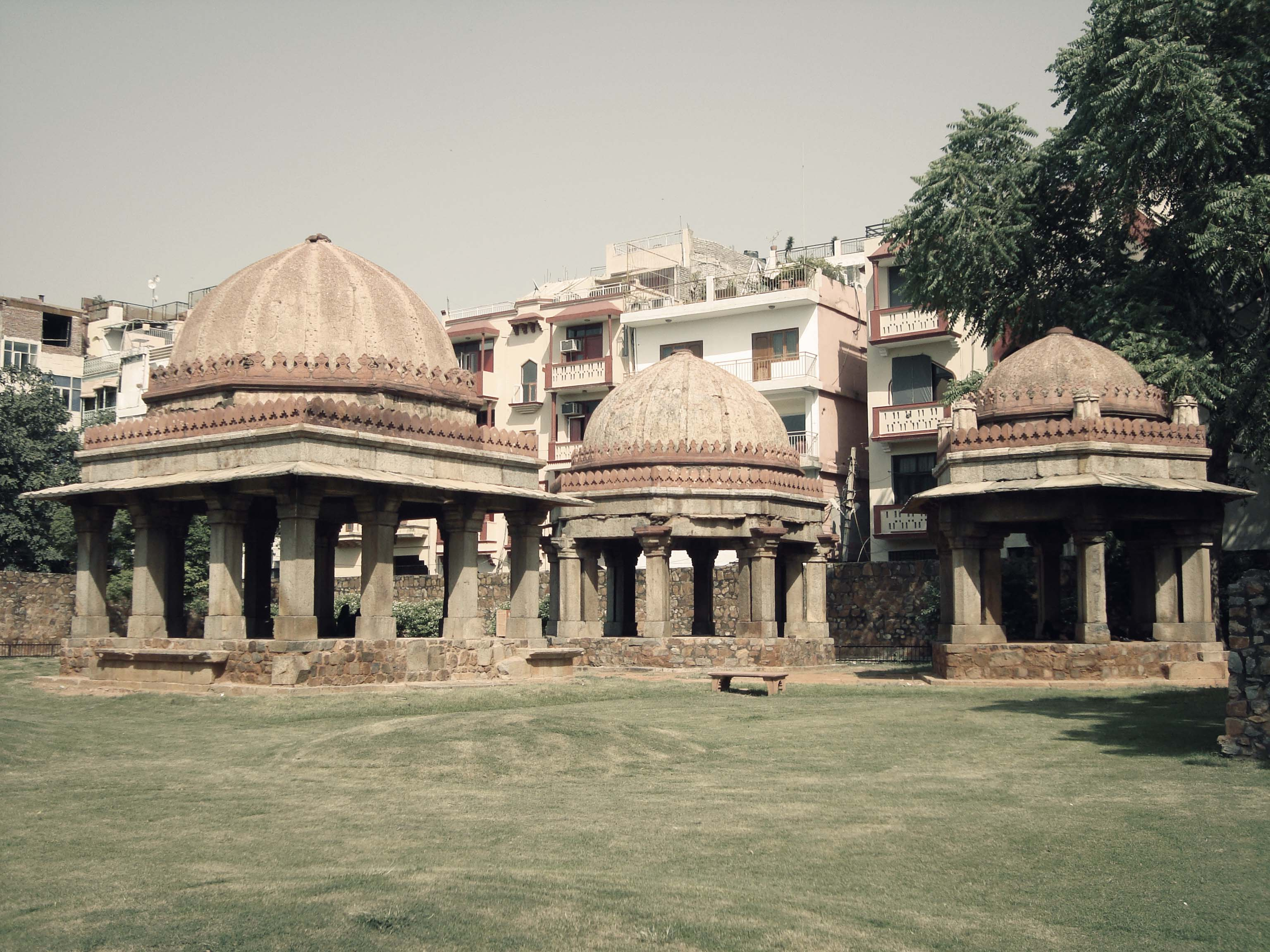
Pavilions in the Hauz Khas Complex, Delhi

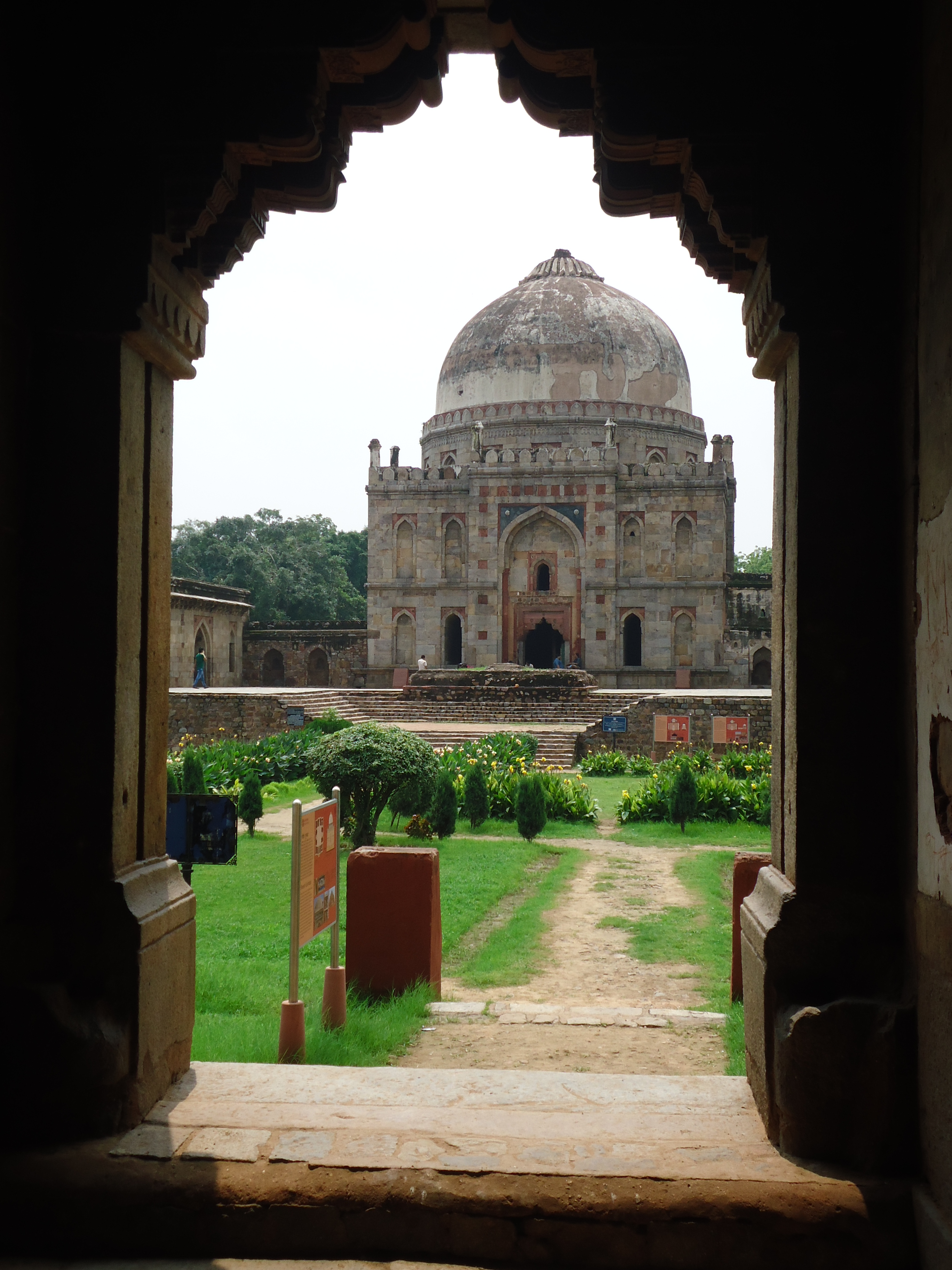
The Shish Gumbad in the Lodi Gardens, Delhi

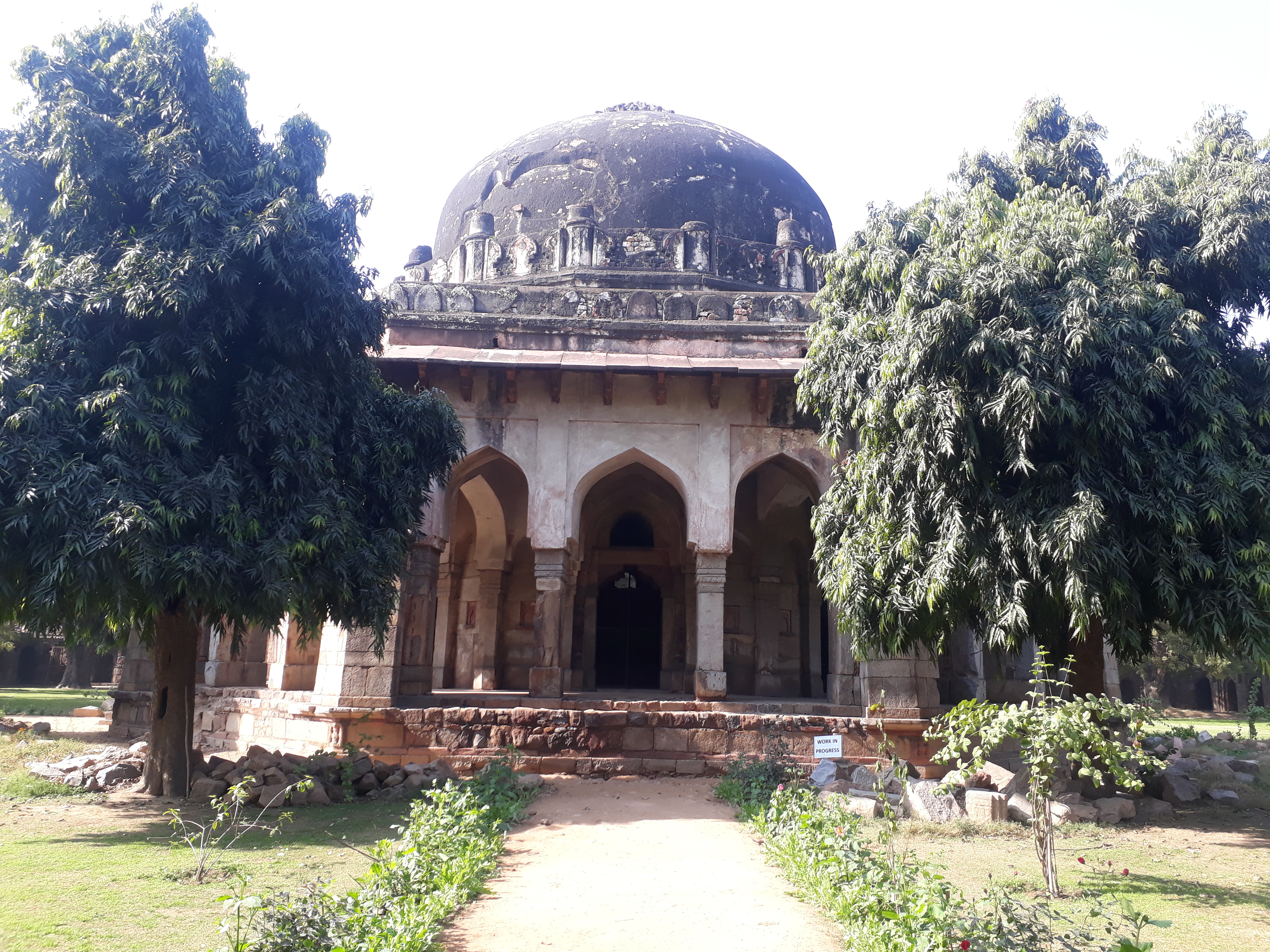
Tomb of Sikandar Lodi in the Lodi Gardens, Delhi

== Decline ==
=== Cities ===
While the sacking of cities was not uncommon in medieval warfare, the army of the Delhi Sultanate also often destroyed cities in its military expeditions. According to Jain chronicler Jinaprabha Suri, Nusrat Khan's conquests destroyed hundreds of towns including Ashapalli (modern-day Ahmedabad), Anhilvad (modern-day Patan), Vanthali and Surat in Gujarat. This account is corroborated by Ziauddin Barani.

=== Battles and massacres ===
- Ghiyas ud din Balban wiped out the Rajputs of Mewar and Awadh, killing approximately 100,000 people.
- Alauddin Khalji ordered the killing of 30,000 people at Chittor.
- Alauddin Khalji ordered the killing Brahmins during his raid on Devagiri.
- Firuz Shah Tughlaq killed 180,000 people during his invasion of Odisha.
- According to Sri Vaishnava temple chronicle (Kōil Oḻugu), during the 1323 expedition led by Ulugh Khan (later Muhammad bin Tughluq), the Ranganathaswamy Temple at Srirangam was sacked and an estimated 12,000 Vaishnava scholars and temple functionaries were killed. The text records that the acharya Pillai Lokacharya evacuated the processional deity (utsava-mūrti) southwards, while Vedanta Desika concealed the sacred manuscripts and the sanctum's primary deity (mūlava-mūrti) behind a stone wall before fleeing to safety.

=== Desecration ===
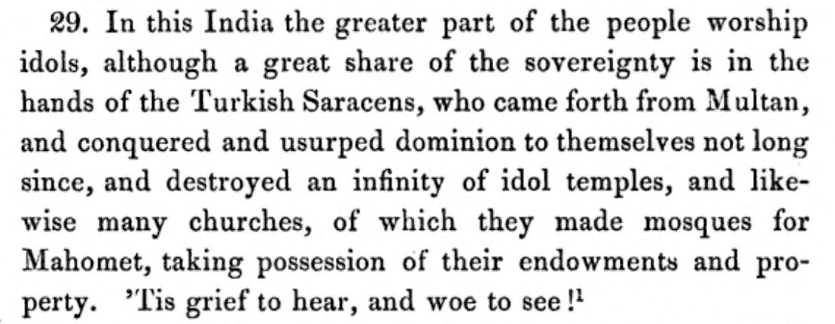
Jordan Catala was a contemporary European witness of the destructions by the "Turkish Saracens" in India (extract from Mirabilia Descripta, written in 1329–1338).

Historian Richard Eaton has tabulated a campaign of destruction of idols and temples by the Delhi Sultans, intermixed with certain years where the temples were protected from desecration. In his paper, he has listed 37 instances of Hindu temples being desecrated or destroyed in India during the Delhi Sultanate, from 1234 to 1518, for which reasonable evidences are available. He notes that this was not unusual in medieval India, as there were numerous recorded instances of temple desecration by Hindu and Buddhist kings against rival Indian kingdoms between 642 and 1520, involving conflict between devotees of different Hindu deities, as well as between Hindus, Buddhists and Jains at small scales. He also noted there were also many instances of Delhi sultans, who often had Hindu ministers, ordering the protection, maintenance and repairing of temples, according to both Muslim and Hindu sources. For example, a Sanskrit inscription notes that Sultan Muhammad bin Tughluq repaired a Shiva and Parvati temple in Bidar after his Deccan conquest. There was often a pattern of Delhi sultans plundering or damaging temples during the conquest and then patronising or repairing temples after the conquest. This pattern came to an end with the Mughal Empire, where Akbar's chief minister Abu'l-Fazl criticised the excesses of earlier sultans such as Mahmud of Ghazni.

In the majority of cases, the demolished remains, rocks and broken statue pieces of temples destroyed by Delhi sultans were reused to build mosques and other buildings. For example, the Qutb complex in Delhi was built from stones from 27 demolished Hindu and Jain temples by some accounts. Similarly, the Muslim mosque in Khanapur, Maharashtra was built from the looted parts and demolished remains of Hindu temples.

The first historical record of a campaign of destruction of temples and defacement of faces or heads of Hindu idols lasted from 1193 to 1194 in Rajasthan, Punjab, Haryana and Uttar Pradesh under the command of Ghuri. Under the Mamluks and Khaljis, the campaign of temple desecration expanded to Bihar, Madhya Pradesh, Gujarat and Maharashtra, and continued through the late 13th century. The campaign extended to Andhra Pradesh, Karnataka and Tamil Nadu under Malik Kafur and Ulugh Khan in the 14th century, and by the Bahmanis in the 15th century. Orissa temples were destroyed in the 14th century under the Tughlaqs.

Beyond destruction and desecration, the sultans of the Delhi Sultanate in some cases had forbidden the reconstruction or repair of damaged Hindu, Jain and Buddhist temples. In certain cases, the Sultanate would grant a permit for repairs and construction of temples if the patron or religious community paid jizya (fee, tax). For example, a proposal by the Chinese to repair Himalayan Buddhist temples destroyed by the Sultanate army was refused, because such temple repairs were only allowed if the Chinese agreed to pay jizya tax to the treasury of the Sultanate. According to Eva De Clercq, an expert in the study of Jainism, the Delhi Sultans did not strictly prohibit construction of new temples in the sultanate, Islamic law notwithstanding. In his memoirs, Firoz Shah Tughlaq describes how he destroyed temples and built mosques instead and killed those who dared build new temples. Other historical records from wazirs, amirs and the court historians of various Sultans of the Delhi Sultanate describe the grandeur of idols and temples they witnessed in their campaigns and how these were destroyed and desecrated.

Temple desecration during Delhi Sultanate period, a list prepared by Richard Eaton in Temple Desecration and Indo-Muslim States
| Sultan / Agent | Dynasty | Years | Temple Sites Destroyed | States |
|---|---|---|---|---|
| Muhammad of Ghor, Qutb ud-Din Aibak and Bakhtiyar Khalji | Ghurids | 1192–1206 | Ajmer, Samana, Kuhram, Delhi, Kara, Pushkar, Anahilavada, Kol, Kannauj, Varanasi, Nalanda, Odantapuri, Somapura, Vikramashila | Rajasthan, Punjab, Haryana, Gujarat, Uttar Pradesh, Bihar, Bengal |
| Iltumish, Jalal-ud-din Khalji, Alauddin Khalji, Malik Kafur | Mamluk and Khalji | 1211–1320 | Bhilsa, Ujjain, Jhain, Vijapur, Devagiri, Ellora, Lonar, Somnath, Ashapalli, Khambhat, Vamanathali, Surat, Dhar, Mandu, Ranthambore, Chittor, Siwana, Jalore, Hanmakonda, Dvarasamudra, Chidambaram, Srirangam, Madurai | Bihar, Madhya Pradesh, Rajasthan, Gujarat, Maharashtra, Telangana, Karnataka, Tamil Nadu |
| Ulugh Khan, Firuz Shah Tughlaq, Raja Nahar Khan, Muzaffar Khan | Khalji and Tughlaq | 1320–1395 (Note: Ulugh Khan also known as Almas Beg was brother of Ala-al Din Khalji; his destruction campaign overlapped the two dynasties.) | Warangal, Bodhan, Pillalamarri, Ghanpur, Dvarasamudra, Belur, Somanathapura, Puri, Cuttack, Jajpur, Jaunpur, Sainthali, Idar (Note: Somnath temple went through cycles of destruction by Sultans and rebuilding by Hindus.) | Gujarat, Telangana, Karnataka, Orissa, Haryana |
| Sikandar, Muzaffar Shah, Ahmad Shah, Mahmud | Sayyid | 1400–1442 | Paraspur, Bijbehara, Tripureshvara, Idar, Diu, Manvi, Sidhpur, Navasari, Dilwara, Kumbhalmer | Gujarat, Rajasthan |
| Suhrab, Begada, Bahmanis, Khalil Shah, Khawwas Khan, Sikandar Lodi, Ibrahim Lodi | Lodi | 1457–1518 | Mandalgarh, Malan, Dwarka, Alampur, Kondapalli, Kanchipuram, Amod, Nagarkot, Girnar, Vadnagar, Junagadh, Pavagadh, Utgir, Narwar, Khajuraho, Gwalior | Rajasthan, Gujarat, Himachal Pradesh, Madhya Pradesh, Telangana, Andhra Pradesh, Tamil Nadu |

Iconoclasm under the Delhi Sultanate

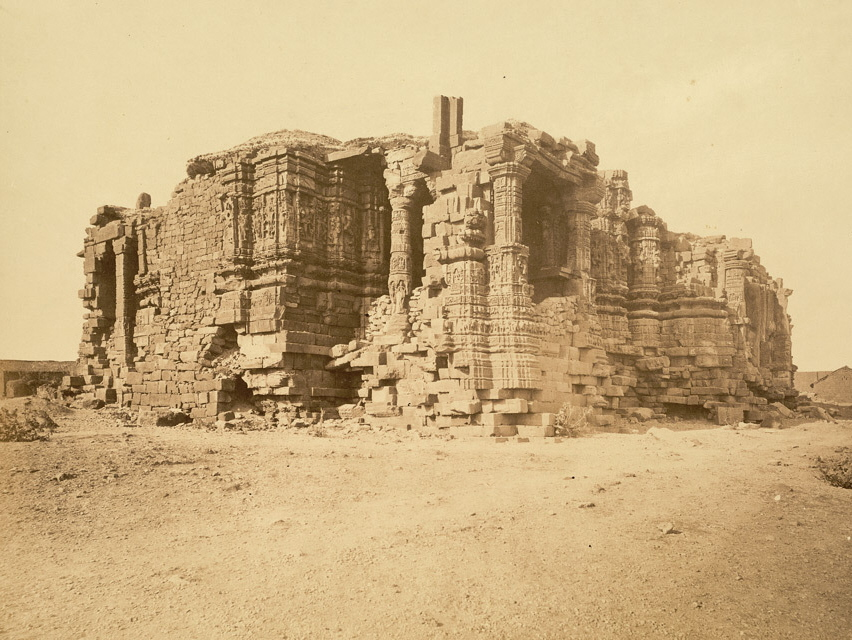
The Somnath Temple in Gujarat was repeatedly destroyed by Delhi Sultanate armies and rebuilt by Chaulukya armies. It was destroyed by the Delhi Sultanate's army in 1299 and was rebuilt afterwards.

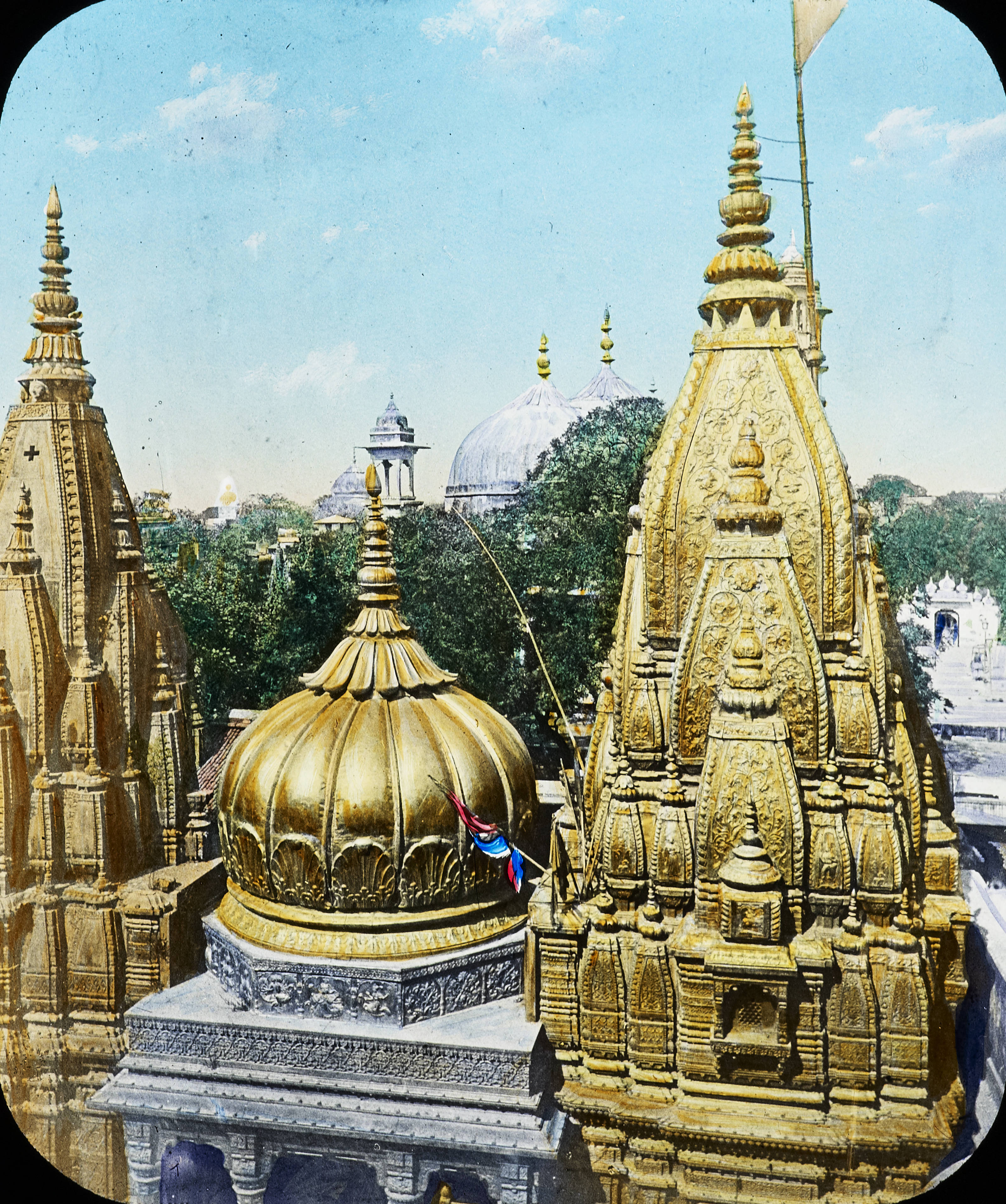
The Kashi Vishwanath Temple was destroyed by Muhammad of Ghor along with thousand other temples in Varanasi.

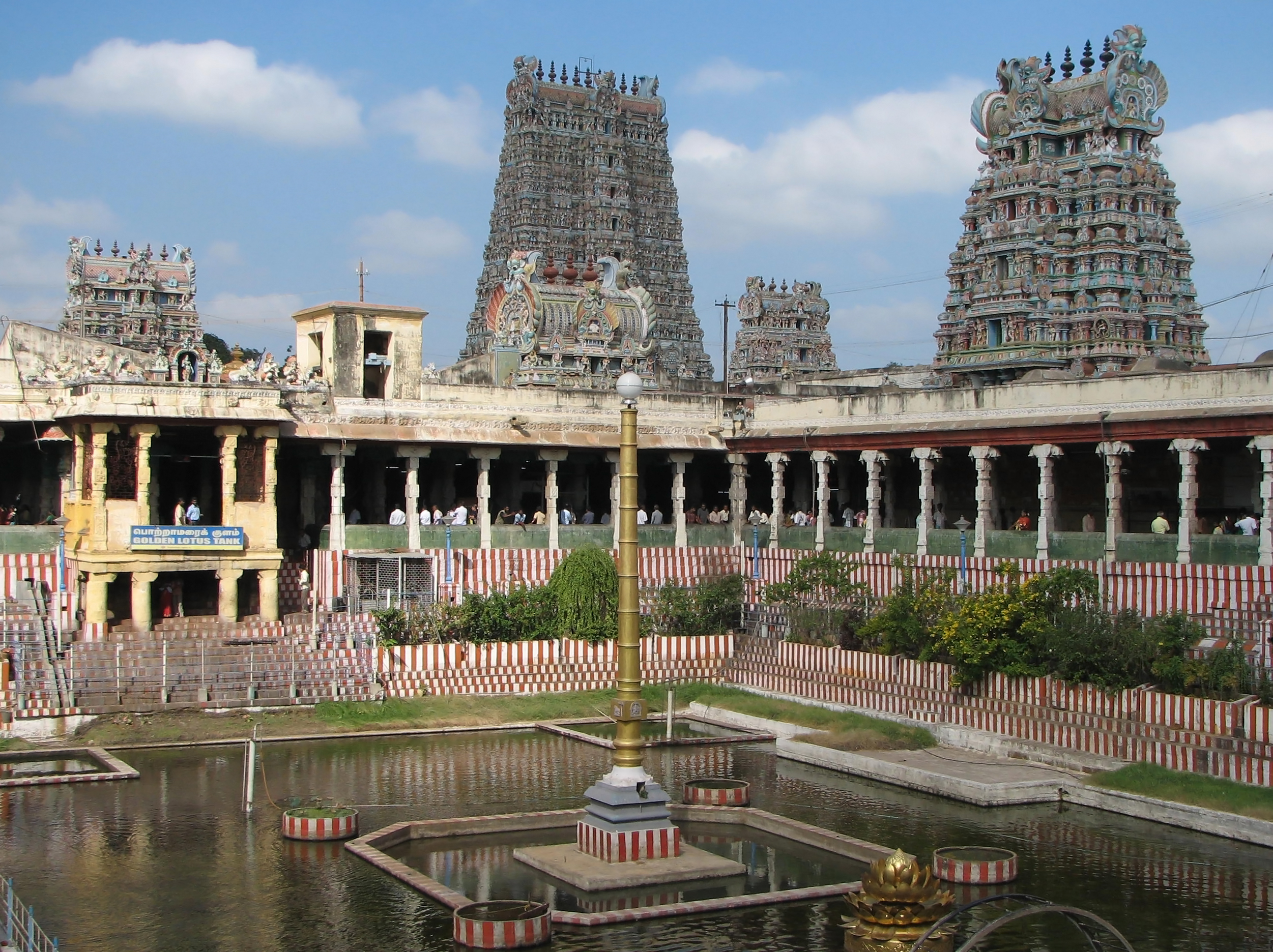
The armies of the Delhi Sultanate led by their Delhi Sultanate commander Malik Kafur demolished and plundered the Meenakshi Temple of Madurai and looted it of all its wealth.

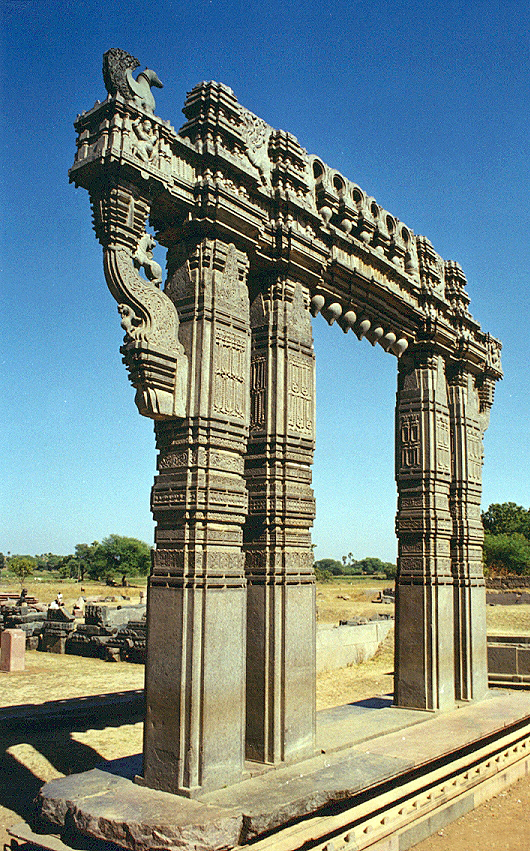
Kakatiya Kala Thoranam (Warangal Gate) built by the Kakatiya dynasty in ruins; one of the many temple complexes destroyed by the Delhi Sultanate.

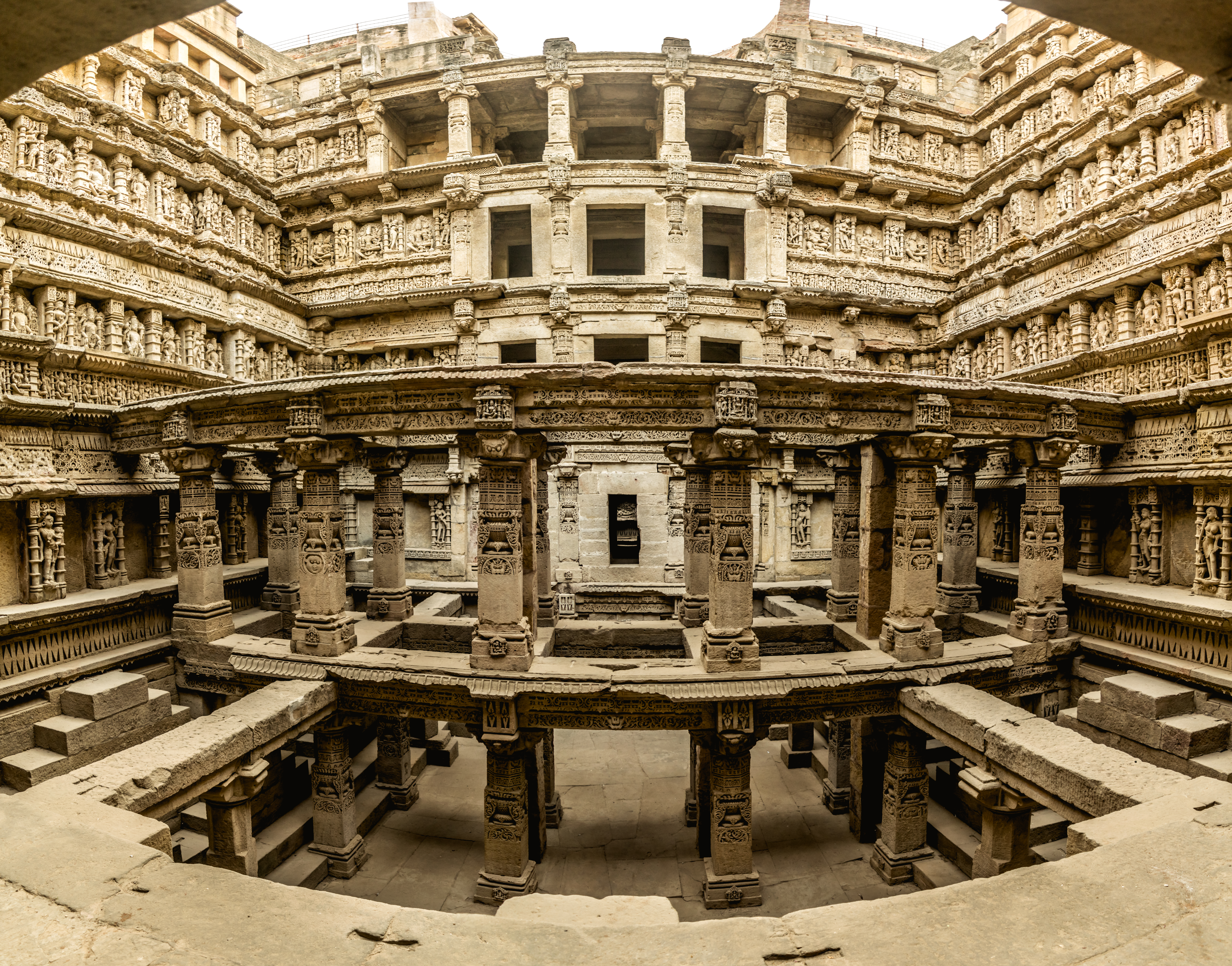
Rani ki Vav is a stepwell, built by the Chaulukya dynasty, located in Patan; the city was sacked by Sultan of Delhi Qutb ud-Din Aibak between 1200 and 1210, and again by the Allauddin Khalji in 1298.

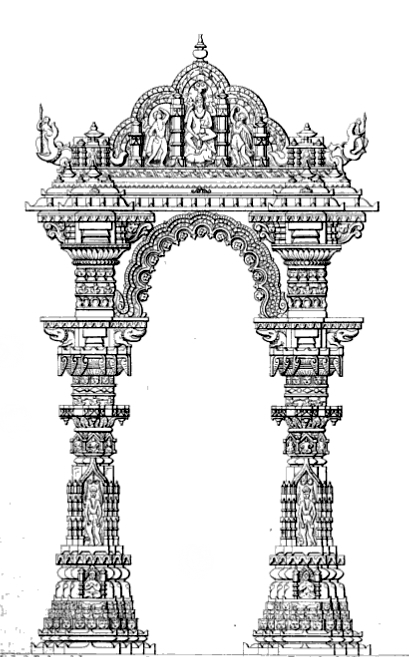
Artistic rendition of the Kirtistambha at Rudra Mahalaya Temple. The temple was destroyed by Alauddin Khalji.

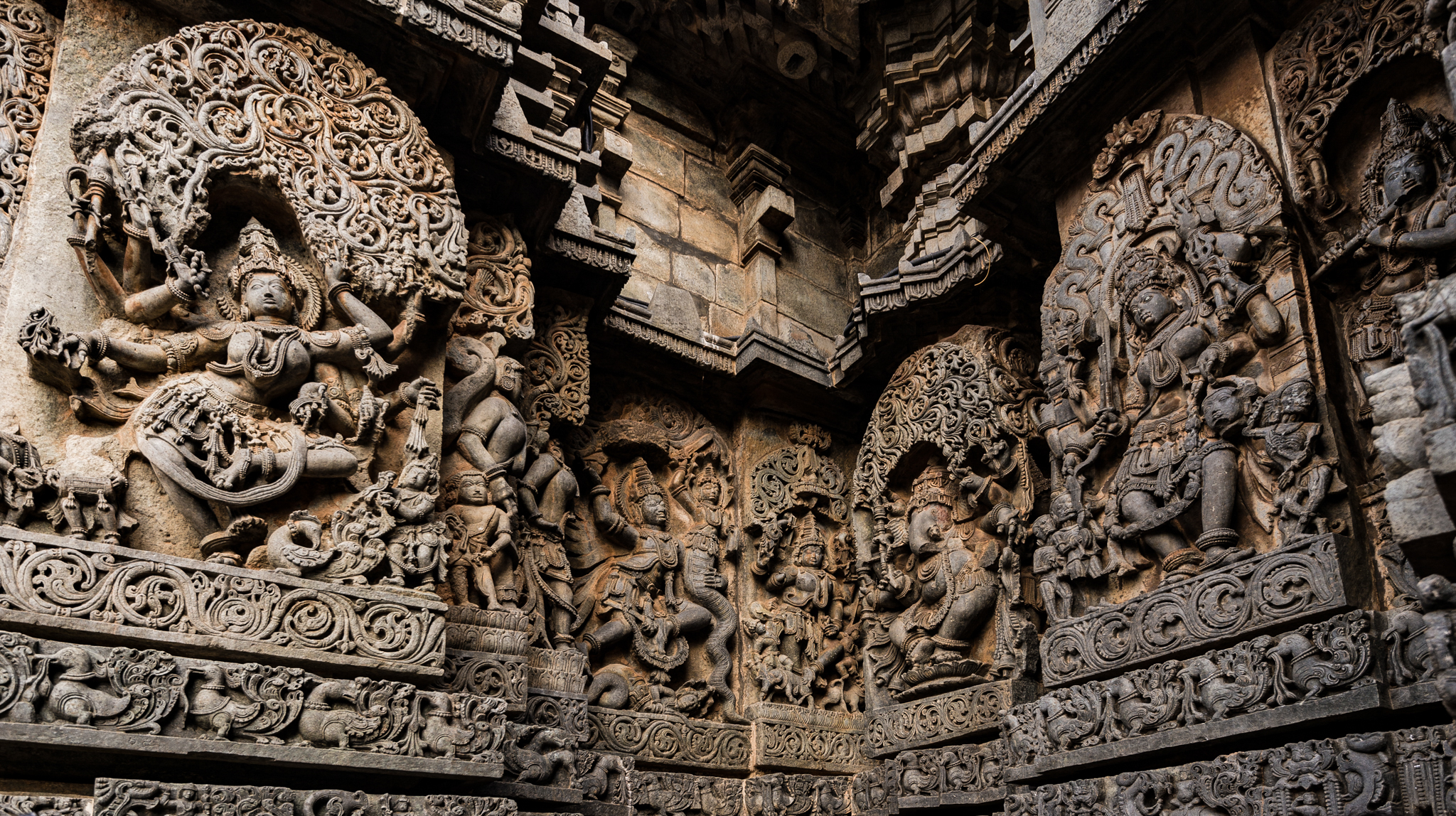
Exterior wall reliefs at Hoysaleshvara Temple. The temple was twice sacked and plundered by the Delhi Sultanate.

== See also ==
- Delhi Sultanate literature – Medieval Indian literature
- Ibrahim Lodi's Tomb – Enclosured Tomb of Afghan Sultan of Hindustan
- Iconoclasm – Destruction of religious images
- Islam in South Asia – Overview of Islam in South Asia
- Mongol invasions of India – Series of military offensives (1221–1327)
- Persianate states – Society strongly influenced by Persian culture
- Tomb of Bahlol Lodi – Tomb in Delhi, India
- Turkish slaves in the Delhi Sultanate – Slavery of Turkic peoples in the Delhi Sultanate

== Notes ==
67

== Bibliography ==
- Asher, C. B.; Talbot, C. (1 January 2008). India Before Europe (1st ed.). Cambridge University Press. ISBN 978-0-521-51750-8.
- Blair, Sheila; Bloom, Jonathan M. (1995). The Art and Architecture of Islam, 1250–1800. Yale University Press Pelican History of Art. ISBN 0300064659.
- Satish Chandra (2007). History of Medieval India: 800–1700. Orient Longman. ISBN 978-81-250-3226-7.
- Eaton, Richard M. (2020) [1st pub. 2019]. India in the Persianate Age. London: Penguin Books. ISBN 978-0-141-98539-8. * Ettinghausen, Richard; Grabar, Oleg; Jenkins-Madina, Marilyn (2001). Islamic Art and Architecture: 650–1250. Yale University Press. ISBN 9780300088694.
- Harle, J.C. (1994). The Art and Architecture of the Indian Subcontinent (2nd ed.). Yale University Press Pelican History of Art. ISBN 0300062176.
- Hartel, Herbert (1997). "India under the Moghol Empire". In Kissling, H. J.; Barbour, N.; Spuler, Bertold; Trimingham, J. S.; Bagley, F. R. C. (eds.). The Last Great Muslim Empires. BRILL. pp. 262–263. ISBN 90-04-02104-3.
- Jackson, Peter (April 1999). the Delhi Sultanate: A Political and Military History. Cambridge University Press.
  - Jackson, Peter (2003). The Delhi Sultanate: A Political and Military History. Cambridge University Press. ISBN 978-0-521-54329-3.
- Lal, Kishori Saran (1950). History of the Khaljis (1290–1320). Allahabad: The Indian Press. OCLC 685167335.
- Ludden, David (2002), India And South Asia: A Short History, Oxford: Oneworld, xii, 306, ISBN 978-1-85168-237-9.
- Majumdar, R. C., Raychaudhuri, H., & Datta, K. (1951). An advanced history of India: 2. London: Macmillan.
- Majumdar, R. C., & Munshi, K. M. (1990). The Delhi Sultanate. Bombay: Bharatiya Vidya Bhavan.
- Prasad, Pushpa (1990). Sanskrit Inscriptions of Delhi Sultanate 1191-1526. Oxford University Press.
- Ray, Aniruddha (4 March 2019). The Sultanate of Delhi (1206–1526): Polity, Economy, Society and Culture. Routledge. ISBN 9781000007299.
- Banarsi Prasad Saksena (1992) [1970]. "The Khaljis: Alauddin Khalji". In Mohammad Habib; Khaliq Ahmad Nizami (eds.). A Comprehensive History of India: The Delhi Sultanate (A.D. 1206–1526). Vol. 5 (2nd ed.). The Indian History Congress / People's Publishing House. OCLC 31870180.
- Schwartzberg, Joseph E. (1978). A Historical atlas of South Asia. Chicago: University of Chicago Press. ISBN 0226742210. Archived from the original on 5 June 2021.
- Smith, Vincent Arthur (1920). The Oxford History of India: From the Earliest Times to the End of 1911. Clarendon Press.
- Srivastava, Ashirvadi Lal (1929). The Sultanate Of Delhi 711–1526 A D (2nd ed.). Shiva Lal Agarwala & Company. OCLC 607636383.
