= 2014 Indian general election in Delhi =

Indian general election, 2014 (Delhi)
- 10 April 2014

7 seats
- Turnout: 65.10% ▲13.24pp
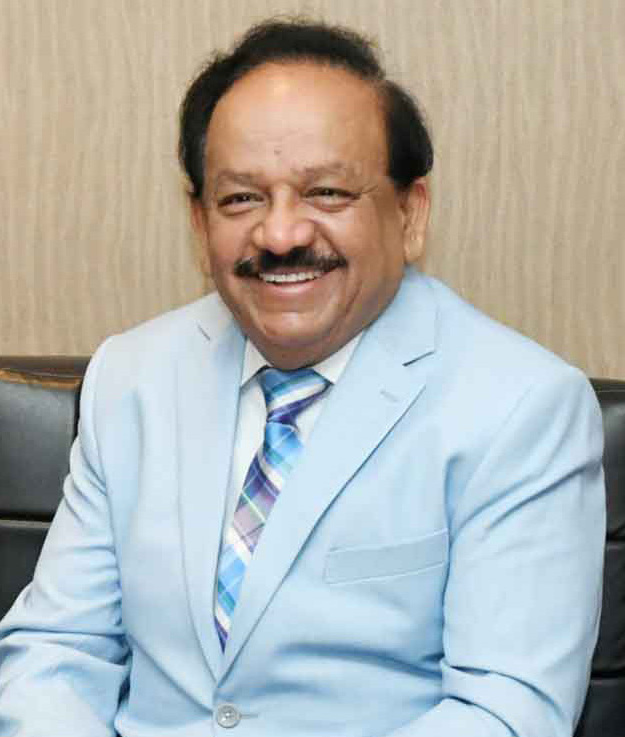

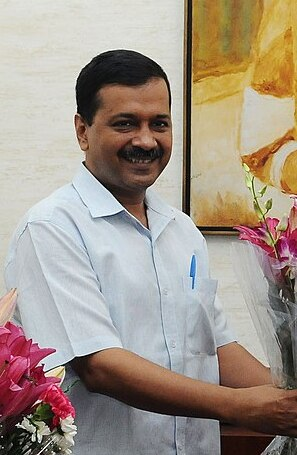

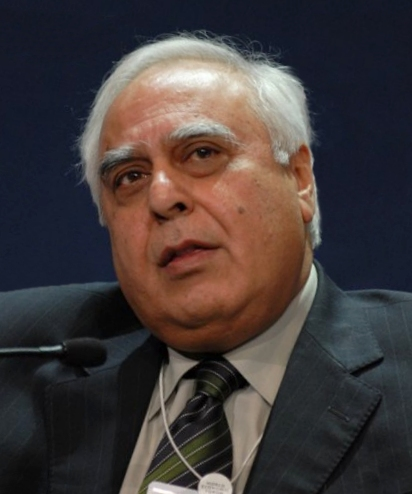
	First party	Second party	Third party
Leader	Harsh Vardhan	Arvind Kejriwal	Kapil Sibal
Party	BJP	AAP	INC
Leader's seat	Chandni Chowk (Won)	Did not contest in Delhi	Chandni Chowk (lost)
Seats won	7	0	0
Seat change	▲7	New party	▼7
Percentage	46.40%	32.90%	15.10%
Swing	▲11.17pp	New party	▼42.01pp
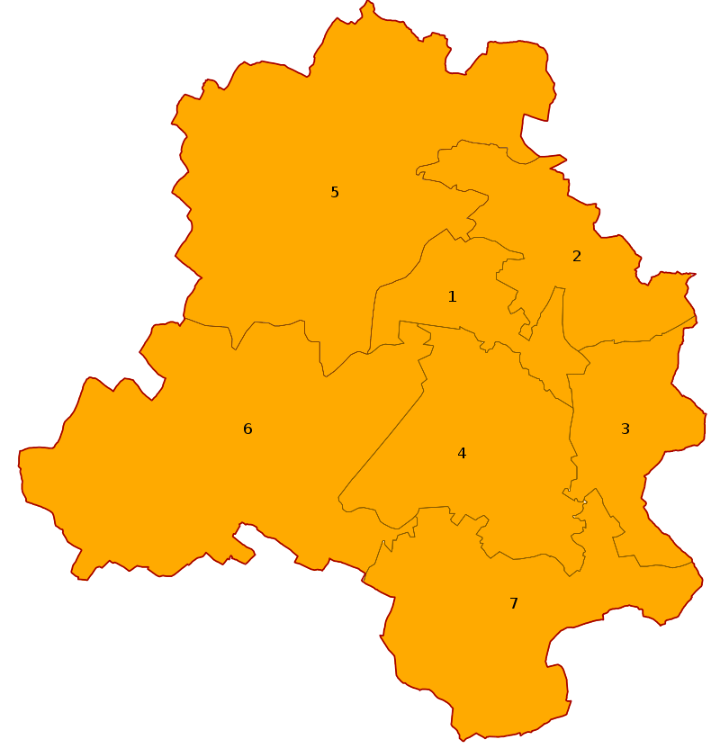
- Delhi
Prime Minister before election
Manmohan Singh
INC
Prime Minister after election
Narendra Modi
BJP

The 2014 Indian general election polls in Delhi for seven Lok Sabha seats was held in a single phase on 10 April 2014. As of 16 December 2013, the total voter strength of Delhi is 11,932,069.

The Main political parties are Aam Aadmi Party, Bharatiya Janata Party and Indian National Congress. Bharatiya Janata Party won all 7 seats.

== Opinion polling ==
Conducted in month(s)	Ref	Polling Organisation/Agency	Sample size			
Conducted in month(s)	Ref	Polling Organisation/Agency	Sample size	INC	BJP	AAP
Aug–Oct 2013		Times Now-India TV-CVoter	24,284	3	4	0
Jan–Feb 2014		Times Now-India TV-CVoter	14,000	0	4	3
March 2014		NDTV- Hansa Research	46,571	1	2	4
March–April 2014		CNN-IBN-Lokniti-CSDS	891	0–1	3–4	2–3
28–29 March 2014		India Today- Cicero	1,188	0–2	5–7	1–2
April 2014		NDTV- Hansa Research	24,000	0	6	1
28–29 April 2014		India Today- Cicero	1,188	1	4	2

== Election schedule ==
Constituency wise Election schedule are given below –

Polling Day	Phase	Date	Constituencies	Voting Percentage
1	3	10 April	Chandani Chowk, North East Delhi, East Delhi, New Delhi, North West Delhi, West Delhi, South Delhi	65.1

== Parties and alliances ==
Party Name	Flag	Electoral symbol	Leader	Seats contested
Bharatiya Janata Party			Harsh Vardhan	7
Aam Aadmi Party			Arvind Kejriwal	7
Indian National Congress			Kapil Sibal	7

== Candidates ==
Constituency							
Constituency		AAP		BJP		INC	
1	Chandni Chowk	AAP	Ashutosh	BJP	Dr. Harsh Vardhan	INC	Kapil Sibal
2	North East Delhi	AAP	Anand Kumar	BJP	Manoj Tiwari	INC	Jai Parkash Aggarwal
3	East Delhi	AAP	Rajmohan Gandhi	BJP	Maheish Girri	INC	Sandeep Dikshit
4	New Delhi	AAP	Ashish Khetan	BJP	Meenakshi Lekhi	INC	Ajay Maken
5	North West Delhi	AAP	Rakhi Birla	BJP	Udit Raj	INC	Krishna Tirath
6	West Delhi	AAP	Jarnail Singh	BJP	Pravesh Verma	INC	Mahabal Mishra
7	South Delhi	AAP	Devinder Kumar Sehrawat	BJP	Ramesh Bidhuri	INC	Ramesh Kumar

== Results ==
=== Results by Party ===
Party Name	Popular vote			Seats		
Party Name	Votes	%	±pp	Contested	Won	+/−
BJP	38,38,850	46.41	▲11.18	7	7	▲7
AAP	27,22,887	32.92	New entry	7	0	Steady
INC	12,53,078	15.15	▼41.96	7	0	▼7
Others	1,55,597	1.88	Steady	71	0	Steady
IND	2,61,664	3.16	▲2.07	58	0	Steady
NOTA	39,690	0.48	New entry			
Total	82,71,766	100%	-	150	7	-

=== Detailed Results ===
Constituency		Winner				Runner Up				Margin	%
#	Name	Candidate	Party	Votes	%	Candidate	Party	Votes	%	Margin	%
1	Chandni Chowk	Dr. Harsh Vardhan	BJP	437,938	44.58	Ashutosh	AAP	301,618	30.71	136,320	13.87
2	North East Delhi	Manoj Tiwari	BJP	596,125	45.23	Anand Kumar	AAP	452,041	34.30	144,084	10.93
3	East Delhi	Maheish Girri	BJP	572,202	47.81	Rajmohan Gandhi	AAP	381,739	31.90	190,463	15.91
4	New Delhi	Meenakshi Lekhi	BJP	453,350	46.73	Ashish Khetan	AAP	290,642	29.96	162,708	16.77
5	North West Delhi	Udit Raj	BJP	629,860	46.44	Rakhi Birla	AAP	523,058	38.56	106,802	7.88
6	West Delhi	Parvesh Verma	BJP	651,395	48.30	Jarnail Singh	AAP	382,809	28.38	268,586	19.92
7	South Delhi	Ramesh Bidhuri	BJP	497,980	45.15	D. K. Sehrawat	AAP	390,980	35.45	107,000	9.70

== Post-election Union Council of Ministers from Delhi ==
#	Name	Constituency	Designation	Department	From	To	Party
1	Dr. Harsh Vardhan	Chandni Chowk	Cabinet Minister	Health & Family Welfare	27 May 2014	9 November 2014	BJP
1	Dr. Harsh Vardhan	Chandni Chowk	Cabinet Minister	Science & Technology; Earth Sciences	9 November 2014	30 May 2019	BJP
1	Dr. Harsh Vardhan	Chandni Chowk	Cabinet Minister	Environment, Forest & Climate Change	18 May 2017	30 May 2019	BJP

== Assembly segment wise lead of parties ==
Party	Assembly segments	Position in Assembly (as of 2013 election)
Bharatiya Janata Party	60	32
Indian National Congress	0	8
Aam Aadmi Party	10	28
Total	70	
