= Bhavna Gaur =

Indian politician

Member of the Delhi Legislative Assembly for Palam
- In office 11 February 2015 – 2025
- Preceded by: Dharam Dev Solanki
- Succeeded by: Kuldeep Solanki

Personal details
- Born: 2 December 1970 (age 55) Delhi, India
- Party: Bharatiya Janata Party (From 1 February 2025-)
- Other political affiliations: Aam Aadmi Party, Independent
- Parent: Mangat Ram Gaur (father)
- Education: Maharshi Dayanand University
- Profession: Politician

Bhavna Gaur is an Indian politician and former member of the Delhi Legislative Assembly. She was a member of the Aam Aadmi Party and represented Palam Assembly constituency in the Seventh Legislative Assembly of Delhi.

Bhavna Gaur resigned from the Aam Aadmi Party on 31 January 2025 ahead of 2025 Delhi Legislative Assembly election and joined Bharatiya Janata Party on 1 February 2025 in the presence of BJP's national vice-president and the in-charge of Delhi Baijayant Panda, and state president Virendra Sachdeva.

== Early life and education ==
Bhavna Gaur completed her education in Delhi and in Rohtak. She holds Bachelor of Arts and Bachelor of Education degrees.

== Political career ==
She was an MCD Councillor in 1997 from Madhu Vihar area on BJP ticket.

She contested in 2013 Delhi Legislative Assembly election from Aam Aadmi Party and received 26.79% votes and came on second position after four term BJP MLA Dharm Dev Solanki who won with a margin of 6.51% votes.

In the 2015 Delhi Legislative Assembly election she defeated Dharam Dev Solanki of BJP by a margin of 30,849 votes (20.90%). Her term as MLA in the Sixth Legislative Assembly of Delhi was her first term.

In the 2020 Delhi Legislative Assembly election she was re-elected.

== Member of Legislative Assembly (2015-2020) ==
Between 2015-2020, she was an elected member of the 6th Delhi Assembly representing Palam Assembly constituency.

== Member of Legislative Assembly (2020 - 2025) ==
From 2020 till 2025, she waa an elected member of the 7th Delhi Assembly representing Palam Assembly constituency.

Committee assignments of Delhi Legislative Assembly

- Member (2022-2023), Public Accounts Committee
- Member (2022-2023), Committee on Government Undertakings

== Electoral performance ==
Delhi Assembly elections, 2013: Palam
Party	Candidate	Votes	%	±%
BJP	Dharm Dev Solanki	42,833	33.30	−10.82
AAP	Bhavna Gaur	34,661	26.79	
BSP	Madan Mohan	24,862	19.33	−3.44
INC	Vinay Mishra	19,531	15.18	−15.29
NYP	Neeraj Kr Sharma	3,631	2.82	
NOTA	None	903	0.70	
Majority		8,372	6.51	−7.14
Turnout		1,28,822	63.14	
Registered electors				
BJP hold		Swing	-10.82	

Delhi Assembly elections, 2015: Palam
Party	Candidate	Votes	%	±%
AAP	Bhavna Gaur	82,637	55.96	+29.17
BJP	Dharam Dev Solanki	51,788	35.06	+1.76
INC	Madan Mohan	10,529	7.13	−8.05
BSP	Ranbir Singh Solanki	900	0.60	−18.73
CPI	Dalip Kumar	488	0.33	−0.06
NOTA	None of the above	475	0.32	−0.38
Majority		30,849	20.90	+14.39
Turnout		1,47,708	65.01	
Registered electors				
AAP gain from BJP		Swing	+29.17	

Delhi Assembly elections, 2020: Palam
Party	Candidate	Votes	%	±%
AAP	Bhavna Gaur	92,722	59.15	+3.19
BJP	Vijay Pandit	60,010	38.26	+3.20
BSP	Geeta	786	0.50	−0.10
RJD	Nirmal Kumar Singh	552	0.35	New
NOTA	None of the above	848	0.54	+0.22
Majority		32,765	20.89	−0.01
Turnout		1,56,982	63.37	−1.64
Registered electors				
AAP hold		Swing	+3.19	

State Legislative Assembly
Preceded by Dharm Dev Solanki	Member of the Delhi Legislative Assembly from Palam Assembly constituency 2015– present	Incumbent
