= South Delhi Lok Sabha constituency =

Lok Sabha Constituency in Delhi

Coordinates: 28.5040°N 77.2140°E

South Delhi DL-7
- Lok Sabha constituency
- Interactive Map Outlining South Delhi Lok Sabha constituency

Constituency details
- Country: India
- Region: North India
- Union Territory: Delhi
- Assembly constituencies: Bijwasan; Palam; Mehrauli; Chhatarpur; Deoli; Ambedkar Nagar; Sangam Vihar; Kalkaji; Tughlakabad; Badarpur
- Established: 1966
- Reservation: None

Member of Parliament
- 18th Lok Sabha
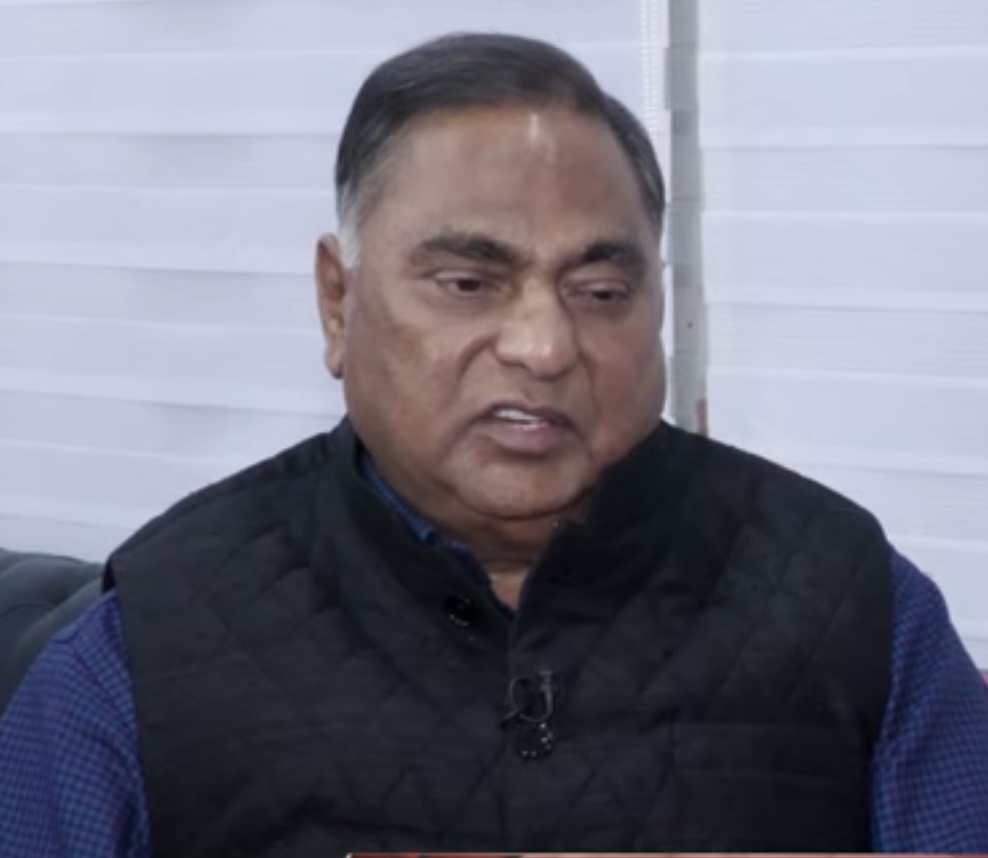
- Incumbent Ramvir Singh Bidhuri
- Party: BJP
- Alliance: NDA
- Elected year: 2024

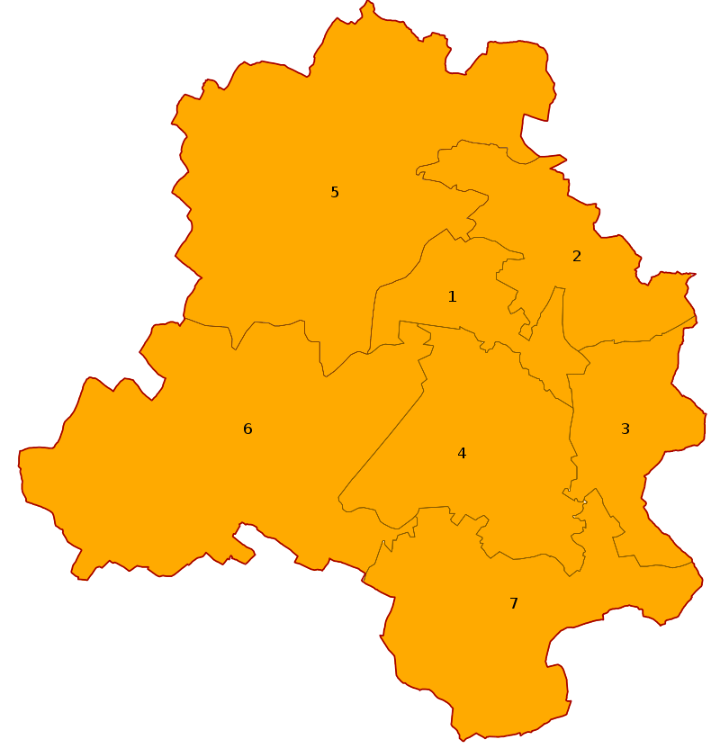
Political Map of Delhi showing Parliamentary constituencies as of 2024 elections.

South Delhi Lok Sabha constituency is one of the seven Lok Sabha constituencies in the Indian National Capital Territory of Delhi. This constituency came into existence in 1966.

The seat was a stronghold of the Bharatiya Janata Party for many years but in 2009, after delimitation, INC won this seat. Ramvir Singh Bidhuri of the BJP is the MP representing the constituency since 2024.

Most successful parties from South Delhi Lok Sabha
1. BJP + BJS (10 times) (63.0%)
2. INC (5 times) (31.0%)
3. JP (1 time) (6.00%)

== Assembly segments ==
Following the delimitation of the parliamentary constituencies, since 2008, it comprises the following Delhi Vidhan Sabha segments:

#	Name	District	Member	Party	Leading (in 2024)
36	Bijwasan	South West Delhi	Kailash Gahlot	BJP	BJP
37	Palam	South West Delhi	Kuldeep Solanki	BJP	BJP
45	Mehrauli	South Delhi	Gajendra Singh Yadav	BJP	BJP
46	Chhatarpur	South Delhi	Kartar Singh Tanwar	BJP	BJP
47	Deoli (SC)	South Delhi	Prakash Jarwal	AAP	BJP
48	Ambedkar Nagar (SC)	South Delhi	Ajay Dutt	AAP	AAP
49	Sangam Vihar	South East Delhi	Chandan Kumar Choudhary	BJP	AAP
51	Kalkaji	South East Delhi	Atishi Marlena	AAP	BJP
52	Tughlakabad	South East Delhi	Sahiram	AAP	AAP
53	Badarpur	South East Delhi	Ram Singh Netaji	AAP	BJP

From 1993 to 2008, it comprised the following Delhi Vidhan Sabha segments:

1. Okhla
2. Kalkaji
3. Malviya Nagar (Polling stations 1–60 and 71–128)
4. Hauz Khas
5. R K Puram
6. Delhi Cantt
7. Janakpuri (Polling stations 1–91)
8. Hari Nagar
9. Tilak Nagar
10. Rajouri Garden
11. Sarojini Nagar (Polling stations 94–107)
12. Gole Market (Polling stations 101–109)
13. Kasturba Nagar (Polling stations 22 and 115–119)

From 1966 to 1993, South Delhi Lok Sabha constituency comprised the following Delhi Metropolitan Council segments:

1. Delhi Cantt
2. Okhla
3. Malviya Nagar
4. R K Puram
5. Hauz Khas
6. Ashok Nagar
7. Tilak Nagar
8. Rajouri Garden

== Members of Parliament ==
The South Delhi Lok Sabha constituency was created in 1967. The list of Member of Parliament (MP) is as follows:

Year	Member	Party
1967	Balraj Madhok	Bharatiya Jana Sangh
1971	Shashi Bhushan	Indian National Congress
1977	Vijay Kumar Malhotra	Janata Party
1980	Charanjit Singh	Indian National Congress (I)
1984	Lalit Maken	Indian National Congress
1985^	Arjun Singh	Indian National Congress
1989	Madan Lal Khurana	Bharatiya Janata Party
1991	Madan Lal Khurana	Bharatiya Janata Party
1996	Sushma Swaraj	Bharatiya Janata Party
1998	Sushma Swaraj	Bharatiya Janata Party
1999	Vijay Kumar Malhotra	Bharatiya Janata Party
2004	Vijay Kumar Malhotra	Bharatiya Janata Party
2009	Ramesh Kumar	Indian National Congress
2014	Ramesh Bidhuri	Bharatiya Janata Party
2019	Ramesh Bidhuri	Bharatiya Janata Party
2024	Ramvir Singh Bidhuri	Bharatiya Janata Party

^By-Poll

== Election results ==
=== 2024 general elections ===
2024 Indian general election: South Delhi
Party	Candidate	Votes	%	±%
BJP	Ramvir Singh Bidhuri	692,832	53.46	▼3.12
AAP	Sahiram Pehalwan	568,499	43.87	▲17.52
NOTA	None of the Above	5,961	0.46	
Majority		124,333	9.59	
Turnout		1,296,306	56.52	▼2.23
BJP hold		Swing		

=== 2019 general elections ===
2019 Indian general elections: South Delhi
Party	Candidate	Votes	%	±%
BJP	Ramesh Bidhuri	687,014	56.58	▲11.41
AAP	Raghav Chadha	3,19,971	26.35	▼9.12
INC	Vijender Singh	1,64,613	13.56	▲2.20
NOTA	None of the Above	5,264	0.43	▲0.07
Majority		3,67,043	30.23	▲20.53
Turnout		12,14,545	58.75	▼4.22
BJP hold		Swing	▲11.41	

=== 2014 general election ===
2014 Indian general elections: South Delhi
Party	Candidate	Votes	%	±%
BJP	Ramesh Bidhuri	497,980	45.17	▲8.65
AAP	Col. Devinder Sehrawat	390,980	35.47	New
INC	Ramesh Kumar	125,213	11.36	▼37.91
IND.	Ruby Yadav	56,749	5.15	N/A
BSP	Sanjay Kumar Rai	10,873	0.99	▼11.06
NOTA	None of the Above	4,010	0.36	N/A
Majority		107,000	9.70	▼3.05
Turnout		1,102,410	62.90	▲15.49
BJP gain from INC		Swing	▼4.10	

=== 2009 general election ===
2009 Indian general elections: South Delhi
Party	Candidate	Votes	%	±%
INC	Ramesh Kumar	360,278	49.27	▲2.36
BJP	Ramesh Bidhuri	2,67,059	36.52	▼13.73
BSP	Kanwar Singh Tanwar	88,120	12.05	▲11.19
CPI	Shrichand Tanwar	5,244	0.72	N/A
Majority		93,219	12.75	▲9.41
Turnout		7,31,294	47.41	▲7.54
INC gain from BJP		Swing	▲2.36	

=== 2004 general election ===
2004 Indian general elections: South Delhi
Party	Candidate	Votes	%	±%
BJP	Prof. Vijay Kumar Malhotra	240,654	50.25	▼2.00
INC	R. K. Anand	2,24,649	46.91	▲0.66
Independent	Shiv Khera	4,832	1.01	▲1.01
BSP	Surjeet Singh Assie	4,100	0.86	▲0.66
Majority		16,005	3.34	▼2.66
Turnout		4,78,876	39.87	▼2.00
BJP hold		Swing	▼2.00	

=== 1999 general election ===
1999 Indian general election: South Delhi
Party	Candidate	Votes	%	±%
BJP	Prof. Vijay Kumar Malhotra	261,230	52.25	▼5.99
INC	Dr. Manmohan Singh	2,31,231	46.25	▲8.50
Independent	Mohammad Sarif	2,846	0.57	N/A
BSP	Narendra Nath Shukla	1,021	0.20	▼1.60
Majority		29,999	6.00	▼14.49
Turnout		4,99,937	41.87	
BJP hold		Swing	▼5.99	

=== 1998 general election ===
1998 Indian general election: South Delhi
Party	Candidate	Votes	%	±%
BJP	Sushma Swaraj	331,756	58.24	▲3.55
INC	Ajay Maken	2,15,043	37.75	▲4.23
BSP	Nisha Gotam	10,260	1.80	N/A
Independent	Jagjit Singh	1,185	0.21	N/A
Majority		1,16,713	20.49	▼0.68
Turnout		5,69,597		
BJP hold		Swing	▲3.55	

=== 1996 general election ===
1996 Indian general election: South Delhi
Party	Candidate	Votes	%	±%
BJP	Sushma Swaraj	294,570	54.69	▲15.20
INC	Kapil Sibal	1,80,564	33.52	▲3.63
AIIC(T)	Manoj Prabhakar	17,690	3.28	New
Majority		1,14,006	21.17	▲11.96
Turnout		5,38,551		
BJP hold		Swing	▲15.20	

=== 1991 general election ===
1991 Indian general election: South Delhi
Party	Candidate	Votes	%	±%
BJP	Madan Lal Khurana	208,728	39.49	▼21.17
INC	Romesh Bhandari	1,58,005	29.89	▼8.25
Majority		48,723	9.21	▼13.30
Turnout		5,28,550		
BJP hold		Swing	▼21.17	

=== 1989 general election ===
1989 Indian general election: South Delhi
Party	Candidate	Votes	%	±%
BJP	Madan Lal Khurana	382,904	60.66	
INC	Subhash Chopra	77,910	22.14	
Majority		2,04,994	38.51	
Turnout		4,66,370		
BJP gain from INC		Swing		

=== 1984 general election ===
- Lalit Maken (Cong) : 215,898 votes
- Vijay Kumar Malhotra (BJP) : 130,847

==== 1985 bye-poll ====
- Arjun Singh (Cong) : 161,744 votes
- V.K. Malhotra (BJP) : 121,830

=== 1980 general election ===
- Charanjit Singh (Cong - I) : 150,513 votes
- Vijay Kumar Malhotra (Janata Party) : 146,413
- Shashi Bhushan (Cong - Urs) : 6339
- Balraj Madhok (Ind) : 2196 votes

=== 1967 general election ===
- Balraj Madhok (BJS) : 105,611 votes
- R. Singh (INC) : 69290

== See also ==
- List of constituencies of the Lok Sabha
- Outer Delhi (Lok Sabha constituency)
