= Palam =

- Residential Colony in South West Delhi
- Location in Delhi
- Coordinates: 28°35′21″N 77°5′9″E
- Country: India
- Union Territory: Delhi
- District: South West Delhi

Government
  - Body: DDA

Languages
- Time zone: UTC+5:30 (IST)
- PIN: 110045 and 110077
- Telephone code: +91 11
- Lok Sabha constituency: South Delhi
- Vidhan Sabha constituency: Palam
- Civic agency: DDA

Palam (phonetically Pālam) is a major residential colony located in South West district of NCT of Delhi, India. It is one of 70 Vidhan Sabha constituencies of the Delhi National Capital Territory in northern India.

== History ==
Palam is among the oldest historically recorded settlements of south-west Delhi and has long been regarded in local tradition as a principal seat of the Solanki Rajputs in the region. According to oral accounts and regional historical traditions, the Solankis are believed to have migrated from Roopnagar near Jaipur during the 11th century and entered the Delhi region during the period of Chauhan ascendancy. They are said to have served as chieftains under the rule of Prithviraj Chauhan, gradually consolidating their influence across the surrounding countryside. Over time, Palam emerged as the leading village of the well-known “Palam Barah”, a confederation of twelve Solanki Rajput villages in south-west Delhi.

These twelve villages formed a historically significant Rajput-dominated cluster, with Palam occupying a central and pre-eminent position as its political and cultural head. The Solanki Rajputs of the region maintained a strong clan-based identity and exercised considerable influence over local agrarian and social structures for several centuries. The collective identity of the “Palam Barah” continues to be referenced in local historical memory as a symbol of Solanki Rajput dominance in the area.

The wider south-western region of Delhi has historically been associated with multiple Rajput lineages. Alongside the Solanki Rajputs of Palam, the Tanwar Rajputs held prominence in areas such as Mehrauli, Mahipalpur named after Mahipal Singh Tanwar, and Naraina named after Naraina Pal Singh Tanwar, while Chauhan Rajput settlements existed across adjoining rural tracts. Together, these settlements contributed significantly to the historical and socio-political landscape of the region.

“When these Solanki Rajputs of Rajasthan migrated to Delhi. They brought with them stone slab of the revered temple of Dada Dev from their original home. It is said that this slab fell down at a place near Palam. Considering the spot as pious and worthy of God’s abode, they built a temple of the deity there and settled around the place”.

There was once a prolonged feud between the Solanki Rajputs of Palam and the Gujjars of neighbouring villages. During this conflict, Thakur Karan Singh Solanki was slain by members of the opposing group. The Solankis later avenged his death and recovered his body, after which a samadhi was constructed in his honour. This memorial came to be popularly known as the “Chhatri”. The account reflects the intense inter-village rivalries and territorial conflicts that characterized rural Delhi in earlier periods. Initially there were 12 villages of the Solanki Rajputs in the Palam region. After conflicts with nearby Gujjar settlements, the Solankis captured several surrounding villages, expanding their presence to around 18 villages, while some Gujjar groups moved towards eastern part of Delhi.

During the Mughal period, Palam continued to function as an important settlement on the outskirts of Delhi. Despite rapid urbanisation in the modern era, the village has retained elements of its historical identity and remains associated with the Solanki Rajput community.

Palam is listed in the Ain-i-Akbari as a pargana under Delhi sarkar, producing a revenue of 5,726,787 dams for the imperial treasury and supplying a force of 1000 infantry and 70 cavalry.

Palam is referenced in a sarcastic Persian verse commenting on the weakness of the Mughal Empire in its Late Period: Sultanat-e-Shah-e-Alam, Az Dilli ta Palam, which means "The dominion of Emperor Shah Alam begins from Delhi and ends at Palam." This indicates that Palam existed during the rule of the Mughal Empire in India.

Palam and surrounding suburbs of Delhi were recaptured by the Maratha forces led by Baji Rao I, in their attempt to take Delhi back from Mughals in 1753.

== Geography ==
Palam is situated 20 km southwest of the New Delhi City Centre. It is surrounded by Delhi Cantt, Dwarka and Janakpuri. Palam is part of the "Dwarka Sub-Division" of the South West Delhi District.

== Government and politics ==
Palam lies in the South Delhi Lok Sabha constituency from where Ramesh Bidhuri from BJP is the MP. In Delhi Legislative Assembly Kuldeep Solanki from BJP is the MLA from Palam. The entire Palam area consisting of wards Mahavir Enclave (147), Mangla Puri (130), Palam (145), Rajnagar (142) and Sadh Nagar (146) falls in the Najafgarh zone of the South Delhi Municipal Corporation.

=== Climate ===
Palam features an atypical version of the humid subtropical climate (Köppen Cwa). The warm season lasts from 9 April to 8 July, with an average daily high temperature above 36 °C (97 °F). The hottest day of the year is 22 May, with an average high of 38 °C (100 °F) and low of 25 °C (77 °F). The cold season lasts from 11 December to 11 February with an average daily high temperature below 18 °C (64 °F). The coldest day of the year is 4 January, with an average low of 2 °C (36 °F) and high of 15 °C (59 °F). In early March, the wind direction changes from north-westerly to south-westerly. From April to October the weather is hot. The monsoon arrives at the end of June, along with an increase in humidity. The brief, mild winter starts in late November, peaks in January and heavy fog often occurs.

Temperatures in Palam usually range from 3 to 47 °C (37.4 to 116.6 °F), with the lowest and highest temperatures ever recorded being −2.2 and 48.4 °C (28.0 and 119.1 °F) respectively. The annual mean temperature is 25 °C (77 °F); monthly mean temperatures range from 13 to 32 °C (55 to 90 °F). The highest temperature recorded in July was 45.7 °C (114.3 °F) in 1987. The average annual rainfall is approximately 714 mm (28.1 in), most of which falls during the monsoon in July and August. The average date of the advent of monsoon winds in Palam is 29 June.

Climate data for Delhi (DEL), 1991–2020 normals, extremes 1952–present
Month	Jan	Feb	Mar	Apr	May	Jun	Jul	Aug	Sep	Oct	Nov	Dec	Year
Record high °C (°F)	31.0 (87.8)	35.7 (96.3)	41.3 (106.3)	45.3 (113.5)	48.4 (119.1)	48.0 (118.4)	45.7 (114.3)	43.2 (109.8)	40.8 (105.4)	39.6 (103.3)	36.4 (97.5)	30.4 (86.7)	48.4 (119.1)
Mean maximum °C (°F)	26.1 (79.0)	29.5 (85.1)	36.4 (97.5)	42.6 (108.7)	45.3 (113.5)	44.9 (112.8)	40.9 (105.6)	38.2 (100.8)	37.8 (100.0)	36.8 (98.2)	32.7 (90.9)	27.4 (81.3)	45.3 (113.5)
Mean daily maximum °C (°F)	19.9 (67.8)	24.1 (75.4)	30.0 (86.0)	37.1 (98.8)	40.7 (105.3)	39.6 (103.3)	36.0 (96.8)	34.5 (94.1)	34.4 (93.9)	33.3 (91.9)	28.3 (82.9)	22.7 (72.9)	31.7 (89.1)
Daily mean °C (°F)	13.6 (56.5)	17.4 (63.3)	22.7 (72.9)	29.4 (84.9)	33.6 (92.5)	33.8 (92.8)	31.7 (89.1)	30.5 (86.9)	29.7 (85.5)	26.6 (79.9)	21.0 (69.8)	15.9 (60.6)	25.5 (77.9)
Mean daily minimum °C (°F)	7.3 (45.1)	10.6 (51.1)	15.4 (59.7)	21.7 (71.1)	26.4 (79.5)	27.9 (82.2)	27.4 (81.3)	26.4 (79.5)	24.9 (76.8)	19.9 (67.8)	13.7 (56.7)	9.0 (48.2)	19.2 (66.6)
Mean minimum °C (°F)	3.6 (38.5)	6.2 (43.2)	9.7 (49.5)	15.3 (59.5)	20.8 (69.4)	22.3 (72.1)	24.1 (75.4)	23.3 (73.9)	21.7 (71.1)	15.6 (60.1)	9.0 (48.2)	4.6 (40.3)	3.3 (37.9)
Record low °C (°F)	−2.2 (28.0)	−1.6 (29.1)	3.4 (38.1)	8.6 (47.5)	14.6 (58.3)	19.8 (67.6)	17.8 (64.0)	20.2 (68.4)	13.6 (56.5)	9.9 (49.8)	2.1 (35.8)	−1.3 (29.7)	−2.2 (28.0)
Average rainfall mm (inches)	18.1 (0.71)	19.3 (0.76)	15.2 (0.60)	13.6 (0.54)	30.2 (1.19)	68.8 (2.71)	205.7 (8.10)	214.2 (8.43)	109.5 (4.31)	12.7 (0.50)	5.5 (0.22)	6.4 (0.25)	719.2 (28.32)
Average rainy days	1.4	1.6	1.4	1.2	2.7	4.0	8.9	9.4	5.0	0.8	0.4	0.4	37.2
Average relative humidity (%) (at 17:30 IST)	56	48	36	24	25	42	62	67	59	43	44	54	47
Source 1: India Meteorological Department
Source 2: Tokyo Climate Center (mean temperatures 1991–2020);

== Economy ==
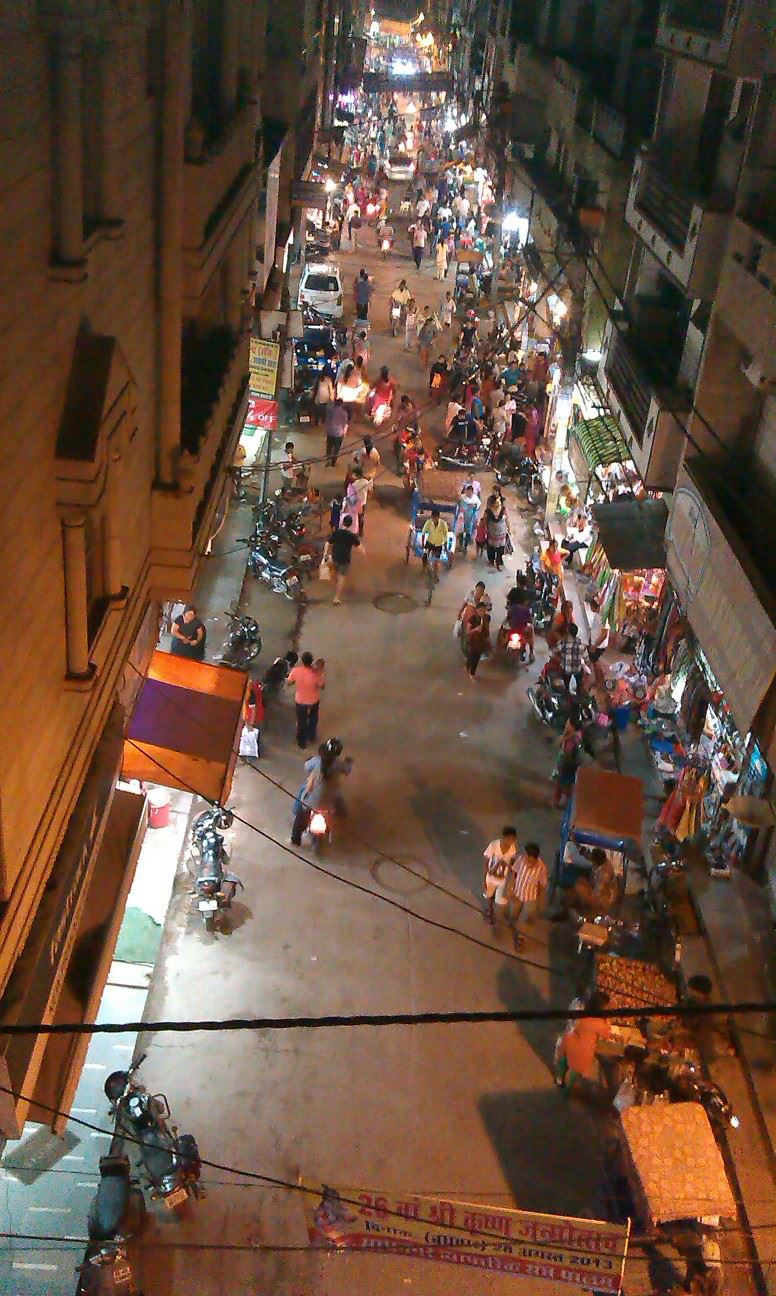
Ram Chowk Market

Palam's market is quite famous with over 1,000 shops. Many shops are located on the Palam Main Road, Ram Chowk, Syndicate Market, Dada Chhatri Wala Marg, Old Mehrauli Road, 60 ft. road.

== Culture ==
Palam's culture is diverse and includes many temples, the biggest and oldest of which is Dada Dev Mandir, worshiped as the gram devta (village god) of the 12 villages, Palam, Shahbad, Bagdola, Nasirpur, Bindapur, Dabri, Asalatpur, Untkala, Matiala, Baprola, Poothkala and Nangalraya. Established in Vikram Samvant 781 or 838 AD, after a dream made Saints Dada Dev and Jaidev transport a stone north from Tonk in Rajasthan, the temple complex is huge and is spread over eight acres. Devotees believe in seeking the blessings of Dada Dev before starting any new venture. All the year around pilgrims come to the temple to offer prayers and to seek fulfilment of their wishes. Many festivals are celebrated here in great joy, particularly Janmastmi (Krishnastmi).

The Palam Mosque is the only surviving building of Babur's reign in Delhi. It is recognised for having been visited by Ibn Battuta. According to an inscription in mixed Arabic and Persian prose on the northern arch of its central compartment, it was built by one Ghazanfar in 935 AH (1528–29).

== Transport ==
=== Road ===
Buses are primarily operated by the DTC and DIMTS; although a privately operated network of chartered buses connects Palam to corporate offices nearby and in the National Capital Territory.

=== Delhi Metro ===
Palam Metro Station is served by Magenta Line of Delhi Metro that directly connects it to Janakpuri and Botanical Garden (Noida). Palam's underground Metro station is situated near Palam Police Station. It was opened for public on 29 May 2018.

=== Rail Network ===
Palam Railway Station has connections to Rewari, Delhi Cantonment and New Delhi. Porbandar, Motihari & Delhi Sarai Rohilla trains pass through Palam Railway Station.

=== Airways ===
Indira Gandhi International Airport, formerly known as Palam Airport, is situated in Palam.

== Health care ==
Palam's public health services network includes Palam Colony D-66 Central Government Health Scheme (CGHS) dispensary, a Primary Health Centre (PHC).
