= Kalkaji Assembly constituency =

Constituency of the Delhi legislative assembly in India

Coordinates: 28.54°N 77.26°E

New Delhi
- Constituency No. 51 for the Delhi Legislative Assembly

Constituency details
- Country: India
- Region: North India
- State: Delhi
- District: New Delhi
- Lok Sabha constituency: South Delhi
- Total electors: 1,46,750
- Reservation: None

Member of Legislative Assembly
- 8th Delhi Legislative Assembly
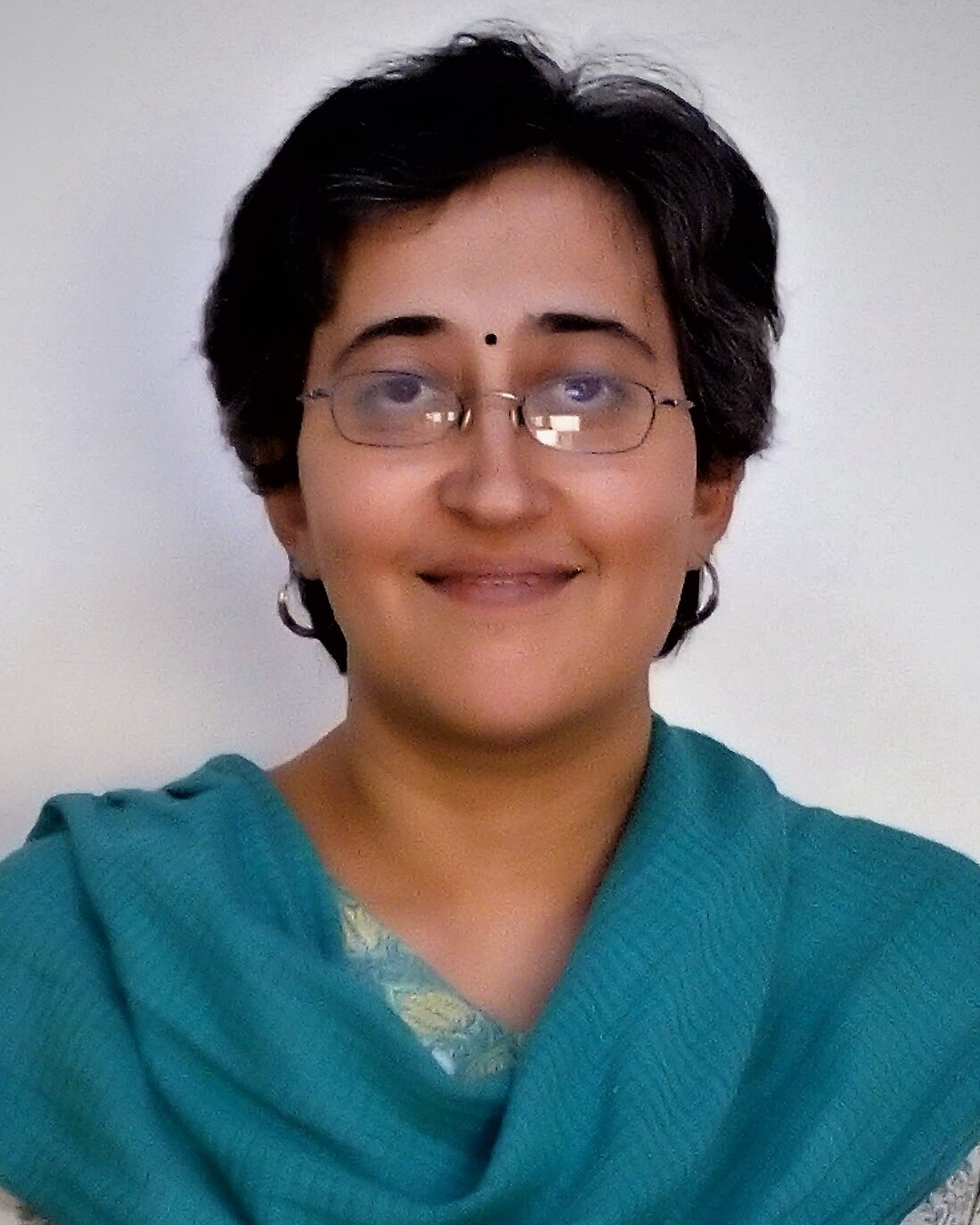
- Incumbent Atishi Marlena
- Party: AAP
- Elected year: 2025

Kalkaji Assembly constituency is one of the 70 Delhi Legislative Assembly constituencies of the National Capital Territory in northern India.

== Overview ==
The present geographical structure of Kalkaji constituency came into existence in 2008 as a part of the implementation of the recommendations of the Delimitation Commission of India constituted in 2002. Kalkaji is part of South Delhi Lok Sabha constituency along with nine other Assembly segments, namely, Bijwasan, Sangam Vihar, Ambedkar Nagar, Chhatarpur, Deoli, Tughlakabad, Palam, Badarpur and Mehrauli.

== Members of the Legislative Assembly ==
Election	Name	Party
1993	Purnima Sethi	Bharatiya Janata Party
1998	Subhash Chopra	Indian National Congress
2003	Subhash Chopra	Indian National Congress
2008	Subhash Chopra	Indian National Congress
2013	Harmeet Singh Kalka	Bharatiya Janata Party
2015	Avtar Singh	Aam Aadmi Party
2020	Atishi Marlena	Aam Aadmi Party
2025	Atishi Marlena	Aam Aadmi Party

== Election results ==
=== 2025 ===
Delhi Assembly elections, 2025: Kalkaji
Party	Candidate	Votes	%	±%
AAP	Atishi Marlena	52,154	48.79	−3.49
BJP	Ramesh Bidhuri	48,633	45.5	+3.87
INC	Alka Lamba	4,392	4.11	−0.53
NOTA	None of the above	556	0.52	−
Majority		3,521	3.29	
Turnout		1,06,876		
AAP hold		Swing		

=== 2020 ===
Delhi Assembly elections, 2020: Kalkaji
Party	Candidate	Votes	%	±%
AAP	Atishi Marlena	55,897	52.28	+0.57
BJP	Dharambir	44,504	41.63	+8.47
INC	Shivani Chopra	4,965	4.64	−8.07
NOTA	None of the above	551	0.52	+0.03
BSP	Jay Prakash Sharma	551	0.44	−0.02
Majority		11,393	10.65	−7.90
Turnout		1,06,910	57.51	−7.34
AAP hold		Swing	+0.57	

=== 2015 ===
Delhi Assembly elections, 2015: Kalkaji
Party	Candidate	Votes	%	±%
AAP	Avtar Singh	55,104	51.71	+20.19
BJP	Harmeet Singh Kalka	35,335	33.16	−0.61
INC	Subhash Chopra	13,552	12.71	−15.67
BSP	Shashi Pratap	491	0.46	−0.90
NOTA	None of the above	528	0.49	−0.15
Majority		19,769	18.55	+16.30
Turnout		1,06,558	64.85	
AAP gain from BJP		Swing	+19.89	

=== 2013 ===
Delhi Assembly elections, 2013: Kalkaji
Party	Candidate	Votes	%	±%
BJP	Harmeet Singh Kalka	30,683	33.77	−0.02
AAP	Dharambir Singh	28,639	31.52	
INC	Subhash Chopra	25,787	28.38	−23.53
Independent	Dharmender Kumar	3,092	3.40	
BSP	Ajay Kr Aggarwal	1,235	1.36	−11.43
JSMP	Mohd Vikki Khan	176	0.19	
DMDK	Ramu	172	0.19	
Independent	Sunil Garg	162	0.18	
Independent	Surender Singh	124	0.14	
Independent	Bhesh Dhari	83	0.09	
SP	Suman Yadav	78	0.09	
JKNPP	Ramesh Chand Yadav	49	0.05	
NOTA	None	581	0.64	
Majority		2,044	2.25	−15.87
Turnout		90,882	63.11	
BJP gain from INC		Swing	-0.02	

=== 2008 ===
Delhi Assembly elections, 2008: Kalkaji
Party	Candidate	Votes	%	±%
INC	Subhash Chopra	38,360	51.91	−12.22
BJP	Jai Gopal Abrol	24,971	33.79	+1.34
BSP	Avinash Kaur	9,455	12.79	
Independent	Sushil Kumar Agarwal	432	0.58	
Independent	Om Prakash Abrol	353	0.48	
Independent	Lavesh Kumar Gautam	172	0.23	
Independent	Mohd Alam	161	0.22	
Majority		13,389	18.12	−13.56
Turnout		73,904	51.3	−1.50
INC hold		Swing	-12.22	

=== 2003 ===
Delhi Assembly elections, 2003: Kalkaji
Party	Candidate	Votes	%	±%
INC	Subhash Chopra	35,721	64.13	+10.51
BJP	Purnima Sethi	18,077	32.45	−11.78
SP	Kalpana	654	1.17	
NCP	Anil Bawa	329	0.59	
IJP	Sarla Singh	278	0.50	
Independent	Rajinder Singh	230	0.41	
Independent	Aswani Kumar	160	0.29	
Independent	Neelam	133	0.24	
Independent	Neeraj Kumar Bakshi	121	0.22	
Majority		17,644	31.68	+22.29
Turnout		55,703	52.80	+7.87
INC hold		Swing	+10.51	

=== 1998 ===
Delhi Assembly elections, 1998: Kalkaji
Party	Candidate	Votes	%	±%
INC	Subhash Chopra	29,948	53.62	+14.59
BJP	Purnima Sethi	24,704	44.23	−3.28
BSP	Sewa Singh	665	1.19	+0.45
JD	Jasvinder Singh	203	0.36	−2.50
SJP(R)	Vijender Kumar	99	0.18	
Independent	Parminder Singh	97	0.17	
Akhil Bharatiya Jan Sangh	Laxmi Narayan Goyal	70	0.13	
Independent	Nirmal Singh	62	0.11	
Majority		5,244	9.39	+0.91
Turnout		55,848	44.93	−16.35
INC gain from BJP		Swing	+14.59	

=== 1993 ===
Delhi Assembly elections, 1993: Kalkaji
Party	Candidate	Votes	%	±%
BJP	Purnima Sethi	22,468	47.51	
INC	Subhash Chopra	18,456	39.03	
Independent	Nasib Singh	3,374	7.13	
JD	Vasantha Nanda Kumar	1,352	2.68	
Independent	Animesh Dass	356	0.75	
BSP	Deep Chand Birwal	348	0.74	
Independent	Vikas Nag Choudhary	299	0.63	
Independent	R N Singh	239	0.51	
Independent	Karan Singh Dewan	90	0.19	
SS	Ishwar Dutt Sharma	88	0.19	
Independent	Chanchal Kumar Ganguli	75	0.16	
BJC	Ashok Kapil	44	0.09	
Independent	N C Ghosal	35	0.07	
Independent	Mohan Singh	24	0.05	
Independent	R P Pokhariyal	23	0.05	
Doordarshi Party	Mandika Devi	20	0.04	
Majority		4,012	8.48	
Turnout		47,291	61.28	
BJP win (new seat)				

== See also ==
- Kalkaji
