= Mahendra Yadav =

Mahendra Yadav may refer to:

- Mahendra Yadav (Nepali politician)
- Mahendra Yadav (Indian politician)
