= Avtar Singh (politician) =

Indian politician

MLA, 06th Legislative Assembly, Delhi
- In office Feb 2015 – Feb 2020
- Preceded by: Harmeet Singh Kalka
- Succeeded by: Atishi Marlena
- Constituency: Kalkaji

Personal details
- Born: 18 February 1963 (age 63) Delhi, India
- Party: Bharatiya Janata Party (2024- present)
- Other political affiliations: Aam Aadmi Party (till 2024)
- Spouse: Satwant Kaur (wife)
- Children: 2 sons & 1 daughter
- Parent: S. Gurnam Singh (father)
- Education: Govt. Boys Senior Secondary School
- Profession: Businessperson & politician

Avtar Singh is an Indian politician and former member of the Sixth Legislative Assembly of Delhi in India. He represented the Kalkaji constituency of Delhi and is a member of the Bharatiya Janata Party political party.

== Early life and education ==
Avtar Singh was born in Delhi. He attended the Govt. Boys Senior Secondary School and is educated till Tenth grade.

== Political career ==
Avtar Singh has been an MLA for one term. He represented the Kalkaji constituency and is a member of the Aam Aadmi Party political party. He left the party to join Bharatiya Janata Party on 20ᵗʰ January 2024.

== Posts held ==
#	From	To	Position	Comments
01	2015	2018	Member, Sixth Legislative Assembly of Delhi	

== See also ==
- Aam Aadmi Party
- Delhi Legislative Assembly
- Kalkaji (Delhi Assembly constituency)
- Politics of India
- Sixth Legislative Assembly of Delhi
