= Dinesh Mohaniya =

Indian politician

Vice Chairman of the Delhi Jal Board
- In office 29 July 2015 – 2 March 2020
- Succeeded by: Raghav Chadha

Member of Delhi Legislative Assembly
- In office 28 December 2013 – 08 February 2025
- Preceded by: Dr. Shiv Charan Lal Gupta
- Succeeded by: Chandan Kumar Choudhary
- Constituency: Sangam Vihar

Personal details
- Born: 31 December 1977 (age 48) New Delhi, India
- Party: Aam Aadmi Party
- Spouse: Rani Mohaniya (wife)
- Children: 1 son and 1 daughter
- Parent: Bhagat Singh Mohaniya Baghel (father)
- Education: Deshbandhu College; Amity University, Noida
- Profession: Politician

Dinesh Mohaniya is an Indian politician affiliated with Aam Aadmi Party (AAP). He was an MLA from Sangam Vihar constituency. He was defeated by BJP candidate Chandan Kumar Chaudhary in the 2025 elections. He was elected to the Delhi Assembly in the 2013 Delhi Legislative Assembly election, after defeating the BJP candidate Shiv Charan Lal Gupta and Congress candidate Jag Parvesh (Sajjan Kumar's son).

In 2014, Mohaniya alleged that the BJP leader Sher Singh Dagar offered him ₹40,000,000 to help BJP form the state government in Delhi. AAP released sting footage of the conversation between the two.

He again won Delhi Assembly Election 2020 from Sangam Vihar, with a margin of 42522 votes by defeating Shiv Charan Lal Gupta (Janata Dal (United)).

== Political career ==
Between February 2015 and August 2015 he was the Chairman, DDC South. Between 2015 and 2020 he was the Vice Chairman, Delhi Jal Board (DJB). From November 2020 till present he served as the Chairperson, Delhi Development Committee, South East District.

Since 2020 he was the Aam Aadmi Party Incharge, Uttarakhand. Since 2020 he was the co-Incharge MCD.

He was arrested in 2016 for molestation and sexual harassment and sent to Tihar Jail in Delhi. He was later acquitted by the Delhi High Court.

== Member of Legislative Assembly ==
=== Second term (2015-2020) ===
In 2015 he was elected as the MLA representing Sangam Vihar in the Sixth Legislative Assembly of Delhi. He was made the Chairman of the Estimates Committee.

=== Third term (2020-2025) ===
He was re-elected to the Delhi Legislative Assembly in 2020 and made the Chairman on the committee on Government Undertakings.

== Electoral performance ==
Delhi Assembly elections, 2025: Sangam Vihar
Party	Candidate	Votes	%	±%
BJP	Chandan Kumar Choudhary	54,049	42.99	▲17.26
AAP	Dinesh Mohaniya	53,705	42.72	▼21.86
INC	Harsh Chaudhary	15,863	12.62	▲10.40
NOTA	None of the above	537	0.43	▼0.32
Majority		344	0.27	▼36.17
Turnout		125,714		
BJP gain from AAP		Swing		

Delhi Assembly elections, 2020: Sangam Vihar
Party	Candidate	Votes	%	±%
AAP	Dinesh Mohaniya	75,345	64.58	▼1.37
JD(U)	Shiv Charan Gupta	32,823	28.13	New
BSP	Suresh Chaudhary	2,930	2.50	▼0.27
INC	Poonam Azad	2,604	2.22	▼0.9
NOTA	None of the above	872	0.75	+0.33
Majority		42,522	36.44	−3.77
Turnout		1,17,577	62.20	−4.48
AAP hold		Swing	-1.37	

State Legislative Assembly
Preceded by ?	Member of the Delhi Legislative Assembly from Sangam Vihar Assembly constituency 2020–	Incumbent
