= Kartar Singh Tanwar =

Indian politician

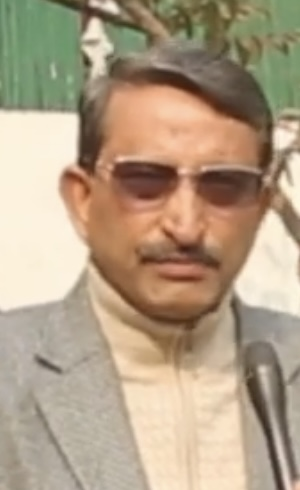

Member of the Delhi Legislative Assembly for Chhatarpur
- Incumbent
- Assumed office Feb 2015
- Preceded by: Brahm Singh Tanwar

Personal details
- Born: 12 December 1962 (age 63) New Delhi
- Party: Bhartiya Janta Party
- Other political affiliations: Aam Aadmi Party (formerly)
- Parent: Horam (father)
- Education: G. B. Pant Polytechnic
- Profession: Politician & businessperson

Kartar Singh Tanwar (born 1962) is an Indian politician and a member of the Eighth Legislative Assembly of Delhi. He representes the Chhatarpur constituency of New Delhi and is a member of the Bhartiya Janta Party.

== Early life and education ==
Kartar Singh Tanwar was born in a Gurjar Family in New Delhi.

== Political career ==
Tanwar has been three times MLA from Bharatiya Janata Party. He represented the Chhatarpur constituency and is a member of the Bhartiya Janta Party . Before joining AAP in 2014, he was a leader with the Bharatiya Janata Party (BJP). His political career, however, started way back in 2007, when he became the corporator for the Bhati ward (two terms). Before taking the plunge into politics, Tanwar was a junior engineer with the Delhi Jal Board (DJB).

On 27 July 2016, the Income Tax department raided Tanwar's home, office, farmhouse along with his brother Chatar Singh's residence. Tanwar had submitted an affidavit in 2015 to the Election Commission of India showing only ₹176 million (US$1.8 million) of total assets.

On 10 July 2024, he renounced Aam Aadmi Party and rejoined Bhartiya Janta Party. On 24 September, Tanwar was disqualified by the Speaker Ram Niwas Goel under the anti-defection law and his membership of the Assembly was terminated from July 10, 2024.

== Electoral performance ==
=== 2025 ===
Delhi Assembly elections, 2025: Chhatarpur
Party	Candidate	Votes	%	±%
BJP	Kartar Singh Tanwar	80,469	48.98	
AAP	Brahm Singh Tanwar	74,230	45.18	
INC	Rajender Tanwar	6,601	4.02	
NOTA	None of the above	868	0.53	
Majority		6,239	3.80	
Turnout		1,64,299		
BJP gain from AAP		Swing		

Delhi Assembly elections, 2020: Chhatarpur
Party	Candidate	Votes	%	±%
AAP	Kartar Singh Tanwar	69,411	49.13	−5.16
BJP	Brahm Singh Tanwar	65,691	46.15	+9.71
INC	Satish Lohia	3,874	2.74	−4.75
NOTA	None of the above	707	0.50	+0.07
BSP	Suraj Bharti	369	0.26	−0.14
NCP	Rana Sujeet Singh	177	0.13	
Majority		3,720	2.65	−15.20
Turnout		1,41,283	64.59	−2.75
AAP hold		Swing	-5.16	

State Legislative Assembly
Preceded by ?	Member of the Delhi Legislative Assembly from Chhatarpur, Delhi Assembly constituency 2020–	Incumbent
