= Tughlakabad Assembly constituency =

Legislative assembly seat in Delhi

Coordinates: 28.514°N 77.269°E

Tughlakabad
- Constituency No. 52 for the Delhi Legislative Assembly

Constituency details
- Country: India
- Region: North India
- State: Delhi
- District: South East Delhi
- Reservation: None

Member of Legislative Assembly
- 8th Delhi Legislative Assembly
- Incumbent Sahi Ram
- Party: Aam Aadmi Party
- Elected year: 2025

Tughlakabad Assembly constituency is one of the 70 Delhi Legislative Assembly constituencies of the National Capital Territory in northern India.

== Overview ==
The Tughlakabad constituency with its present geographical structure came into existence in 2008 as a part of the implementation of the recommendations of the Delimitation Commission of India constituted in 2002. Tughlakabad is part of South Delhi Lok Sabha constituency along with nine other Assembly segments, namely, Bijwasan, Sangam Vihar, Ambedkar Nagar, Chhatarpur, Deoli, Kalkaji, Palam, Badarpur and Mehrauli.

== Members of Legislative Assembly ==
Year	Name	Party
1993	Shish Pal	Independent
1998	Shish Pal	Indian National Congress
2003	Ramesh Bidhuri	Bharatiya Janata Party
2008	Ramesh Bidhuri	Bharatiya Janata Party
2013	Ramesh Bidhuri	Bharatiya Janata Party
2015	Sahi Ram	Aam Aadmi Party
2020	Sahi Ram	Aam Aadmi Party
2025	Sahi Ram	Aam Aadmi Party

== Election results ==
=== 2025 ===
Delhi Assembly elections, 2025: Tughlakabad
Party	Candidate	Votes	%	±%
AAP	Sahi Ram	62,155		
BJP	Rohtash Kumar	47,444		
INC	Virender Singh	2,313		
BSP	Amjad Hasan	1,606		
RBCP	Khursheed Abbas Zaidi	133		
NOTA	None of the above	323		
Majority				
Turnout				
		Swing		

=== 2020 ===
Delhi Assembly elections, 2020: Tughlakabad
Party	Candidate	Votes	%	±%
AAP	Sahi Ram	58,905	54.51	−7.89
BJP	Vikram Bidhuri	45,147	41.77	+12.07
INC	Shubham Sharma	1,342	1.24	−2.90
BSP	Manoj Kumar Ray	1,316	1.23	−0.72
NOTA	None of the above	384	0.36	−0.01
Majority		13,757	12.73	−13.14
Turnout		1,08,098	60.84	−5.53
AAP hold		Swing		

=== 2015 ===
Delhi Assembly elections, 2015: Tughlakabad
Party	Candidate	Votes	%	±%
AAP	Sahi Ram	64,311	62.40	+48.11
BJP	Vikram Bidhuri	30,610	29.70	−9.28
INC	Sachin	4,269	4.14	−7.07
BSP	Giriraj Singh	2,015	1.95	−30.22
RJD	Abdul Basit	236	0.22	N/A
NOTA	None of the above	383	0.37	−0.15
Majority		33,701	32.70	+25.88
Turnout		1,03,087	66.37	
AAP gain from BJP		Swing	+43.47	

=== 2013 ===
Delhi Assembly elections, 2013: Tughlakabad
Party	Candidate	Votes	%	±%
BJP	Ramesh Bidhuri	34,009	38.98	−2.01
BSP	Sahi Ram	28,063	32.17	+1.52
AAP	Manoj Kumar Ray	12,465	14.29	
INC	Om Prakash	9,781	11.21	−14.78
Independent	Shish Pal	1,269	1.45	
JD(U)	Mohd Shabbir	460	0.53	
Independent	Hansraj Nagar	195	0.22	−0.43
Independent	Amit Bidhuri	177	0.20	−0.02
Independent	Rekha Singh	115	0.13	−0.06
Independent	Birju Nayak	108	0.12	−0.17
Independent	Mahipal Singh	81	0.09	
Independent	Balveer	60	0.07	
NOTA	None	457	0.52	
Majority		5,946	6.82	+5.48
Turnout		87,274	66.19	
BJP hold		Swing	-2.01	

=== 2008 ===
Delhi Assembly elections, 2008: Tughlakabad
Party	Candidate	Votes	%	±%
BJP	Ramesh Bidhuri	32,633	40.99	−9.11
BSP	Sahi Ram	24,399	30.65	+21.75
INC	Shish Pal Singh	20,692	25.99	+10.30
Independent	Hans Raj Nagar	519	0.65	
RBCP	Munna	265	0.33	
Independent	Birju Nayak	228	0.29	
Independent	Rajeshwari Meena	191	0.24	
Independent	Rekha Singh	154	0.19	
Independent	Amit Bidhuri	146	0.18	
LJP	Sudesh	120	0.15	
Independent	Naresh Jain	112	0.14	
Independent	Atibal Singh	84	0.11	
Independent	Prakash Chand	62	0.08	
Majority		8,234	10.34	−18.60
Turnout		79,605	55.5	−0.06
BJP hold		Swing	-9.11	

=== 2003 ===
Delhi Assembly elections, 2003: Tughlakabad
Party	Candidate	Votes	%	±%
BJP	Ramesh Bidhuri	41,523	50.10	+11.65
Independent	Shish Pal Singh	17,540	21.16	
INC	Vir Singh	13,001	15.69	−33.90
BSP	Anand Kumar Gupta	7,379	8.90	+4.71
Independent	Durga Devi	675	0.81	+0.36
Independent	R P Pokhriyal	576	0.69	
SP	Mubin Idrisi	312	0.38	
RJD	Raza Hussain	277	0.33	
JSMP	Arjun Singh	225	0.27	−0.05
Independent	Krishna Devi	224	0.27	
RLD	Kusum Sharma	221	0.27	
Independent	Ghanshyam Dhir	220	0.27	
RSP(U)	O P Srivastava	204	0.25	
DMVP	Sameen Bhai	149	0.18	
LP(S)	Tilak Singh	149	0.18	
IJP	Shiv Narayan Dubey	91	0.11	
Independent	Karmveer Singh	69	0.08	
Independent	Om Pal Singh	50	0.06	
Majority		23,983	28.94	+17.80
Turnout		82,885	55.56	+5.92
BJP hold		Swing	+11.65	

=== 1998 ===
Delhi Assembly elections, 1998: Tughlakabad
Party	Candidate	Votes	%	±%
INC	Shish Pal Singh	39,551	49.59	+24.34
BJP	Ramesh Bidhuri	30,672	38.45	+16.77
BSP	Dharam Vir Singh	3,342	4.19	+0.42
Independent	Babu Lal	2,834	3.55	
Independent	Sunil Mehta	683	0.86	
Independent	Dharam Pal Singh	666	0.83	
JD	Gaj Raj Singh	587	0.74	−16.49
Independent	Durga Devi	361	0.45	
JSMP	Vicki Khan	257	0.32	
Independent	Kusum Rani	194	0.24	
AIRJP	Gopal Jha	168	0.21	
Independent	Nuruddin Khan	90	0.11	
Independent	Dr Abdur Kadir Burney	79	0.10	
SJP(R)	Mahesh Joshi	73	0.09	
SS	Kulwant Singh	53	0.07	−0.09
Independent	Raja Ram	45	0.06	
NLP	Mohd Sabir	41	0.05	
Independent	Subash Chand Akela	39	0.05	
Independent	Richhpal Singh	28	0.04	
Majority		8,879	11.14	+5.87
Turnout		79,763	49.64	−11.49
INC hold		Swing	+24.34	

=== 1993 ===
Delhi Assembly elections, 1993: Tughlakabad
Party	Candidate	Votes	%	±%
Independent	Shish Pal	14,683	30.52	
INC	Shyama Sinha	12,151	25.25	
BJP	Ramesh Bidhuri	10,434	21.68	
JD	Manoj Choudhary	8,290	17.23	
BSP	Dharamvir Singh	1,812	3.77	
IPF	Sheo Mangal	128	0.27	
Independent	Jaswant Rai Vig	101	0.21	
Independent	Chander Gupta	83	0.17	
AIFB	Ranbir Kumar	80	0.17	
SS	Ram Kumar Gupta	78	0.16	
SP	Pyare Miyan	64	0.13	
Doordarshi Party	Ram Chander	52	0.11	
BJVP	Jaya Bala	46	0.10	
Independent	Kali Charan Pipal	45	0.09	
Independent	S K Jindal	32	0.07	
Independent	Jagpal Singh	19	0.04	
Independent	Sunehri Lal Tanwar	19	0.04	
Majority		2,532	5.27	
Turnout		48,117	61.13	
Independent hold		Swing		

== See also ==
Tughlakabad (Delhi Metro)
