= Naresh Yadav =

Indian politician

Member of the Delhi Legislative Assembly for Mehrauli
- In office Feb 2015 – Feb 2025
- Preceded by: Parvesh Verma
- Succeeded by: Gajender Yadav

Personal details
- Born: 5 February 1972 (age 54) Kapas Hera
- Party: Bharatiya Janata Party
- Other political affiliations: Aam Aadmi Party (till 2025)
- Spouse: Preeti Yadav
- Children: 1 son & 1 daughter
- Parent: Hira Lal Yadav (father)
- Education: Chaudhary Charan Singh University
- Profession: Politician & advocate
- Website: www.nareshyadav.com

Naresh Yadav (Hindi: नरेश यादव) is an Indian politician and was a member of the Delhi Legislative Assembly in India. He has represented the Mehrauli constituency of the national capital territory of Delhi.

Yadav resigned to Aam Aadmi Party on 31 January 2025 ahead of 2025 Delhi Legislative Assembly election.

== Early life and education ==
Yadav was born in Delhi. He attended the Chaudhary Charan Singh University and attained Bachelor of Laws degree.

== Political career ==
Yadav was a Member Of Legislative Assembly in the Legislative Assembly of Delhi. He was elected twice as the representative from the Mehrauli constituency with the candidacy of the Aam Aadmi Party. In the 2015 Delhi Legislative Assembly election, he polled 51.06% of the votes and won with a margin of 16,591. In the 2020 Delhi Legislative Assembly election, he increased his vote share, polling 54.27% of the votes and won with a margin of 18,161.

== Assassination attempt ==
The results of the 2020 Delhi Legislative Assembly were declared on 11 February 2020. On the night of the same day, while he was returning from a temple visit, the convoy escorting Naresh Yadav was shot at. It resulted in the death of an accompanying Aam Aadmi Party volunteer and he was injured during the incident. The perpetrator was arrested and it appears that he was known to Naresh and to the volunteer.

== Member of Legislative Assembly (2020 - 2025) ==
Since 2020, he is an elected member of the 7th Delhi Assembly.

Committee assignments of Delhi Legislative Assembly

- Member (2022-2023), Committee on Estimates

== Posts held ==
#	From	To	Position	Comments
01	2015	2020	Member, Sixth Legislative Assembly of Delhi	
02	2020	Present	Member, Seventh Legislative Assembly of Delhi	

== See also ==
- Aam Aadmi Party
- Delhi Legislative Assembly
- Government of India
- Mehrauli (Delhi Assembly constituency)
- Politics of India
- Sixth Legislative Assembly of Delhi

== Electoral performance ==
Delhi Assembly elections, 2020: Mehrauli
Party	Candidate	Votes	%	±%
AAP	Naresh Yadav	62,417	54.27	+3.21
BJP	Kusum Khatri	44,256	38.48	+2.31
INC	A. A. Mahender Chaudhary	6,952	6.04	−4.55
NOTA	None of the above	593	0.52	+0.04
BSP	Kamal Singh	470	0.41	−0.07
AIFB	D K Chopra	163	0.14	
Majority		18,161	15.79	+0.90
Turnout		1,15,008	56.68	−6.08
AAP hold		Swing	+3.21	

State Legislative Assembly
Preceded by ?	Member of the Delhi Legislative Assembly from Mehrauli Assembly constituency 2020–	Incumbent
