= Palam Assembly constituency =

Legislative assembly seat in Delhi

Coordinates: 28.592°N 77.090°E

Palam
- Constituency No. 37 for the Delhi Legislative Assembly

Constituency details
- Country: India
- Region: North India
- State: Delhi
- District: South Delhi
- Established: 1993
- Reservation: None

Member of Legislative Assembly
- 8th Delhi Legislative Assembly
- Incumbent Kuldeep Solanki
- Party: Bharatiya Janata Party
- Elected year: 2025

Palam Assembly constituency is one of the 70 Delhi Legislative Assembly constituencies of the National Capital Territory in northern India.

== Overview ==
The present geographical structure of Palam constituency came into existence in 2008 as a part of the implementation of the recommendations of the Delimitation Commission of India constituted in 2002. Palam is part of South Delhi Lok Sabha constituency (Earlier it was under the erstwhile Outer Delhi parliamentary constituency) along with nine other Assembly segments, namely, Bijwasan, Sangam Vihar, Ambedkar Nagar, Chhatarpur, Deoli, Kalkaji, Tughlakabad, Badarpur and Mehrauli.

== Members of the Legislative Assembly ==
Election	Name	Party
1993	Dharam Dev Solanki	Bharatiya Janata Party
1998	Mahender Yadav	Indian National Congress
2003	Dharam Dev Solanki	Bharatiya Janata Party
2008	Dharam Dev Solanki	Bharatiya Janata Party
2013	Dharam Dev Solanki	Bharatiya Janata Party
2015	Bhavna Gaur	Aam Aadmi Party
2020	Bhavna Gaur	Aam Aadmi Party
2025	Kuldeep Solanki	Bharatiya Janata Party

== Election results ==
Vote share of winning candidates
2025	50.45%
2020	59.15%
2015	55.96%
2013	33.30%
2008	44.12%
2003	47.95%
1998	48.62%
1993	41.23%

=== 2025 ===
Delhi Assembly elections, 2025: Palam
Party	Candidate	Votes	%	±%
BJP	Kuldeep Solanki	82,046	50.45	
AAP	Joginder Solanki	73,094	44.95	
INC	Mange Ram Solanki	4,697	2.89	
Independent	Prashant Chauhan	302	0.19	
NOTA	None of the above	1,119	0.69	
Majority		8,952	5.50	
Turnout		1,62,615		
BJP gain from AAP		Swing		

=== 2020 ===
Delhi Assembly elections, 2020: Palam
Party	Candidate	Votes	%	±%
AAP	Bhavna Gaur	92,722	59.15	+3.19
BJP	Vijay Pandit	60,010	38.26	+3.20
BSP	Geeta	786	0.50	−0.10
RJD	Nirmal Kumar Singh	552	0.35	New
NOTA	None of the above	848	0.54	+0.22
Majority		32,765	20.89	−0.01
Turnout		1,56,982	63.37	−1.64
Registered electors				
AAP hold		Swing	+3.19	

=== 2015 ===
Delhi Assembly elections, 2015: Palam
Party	Candidate	Votes	%	±%
AAP	Bhavna Gaur	82,637	55.96	+29.17
BJP	Dharam Dev Solanki	51,788	35.06	+1.76
INC	Madan Mohan	10,529	7.13	−8.05
BSP	Ranbir Singh Solanki	900	0.60	−18.73
CPI	Dalip Kumar	488	0.33	−0.06
NOTA	None of the above	475	0.32	−0.38
Majority		30,849	20.90	+14.39
Turnout		1,47,708	65.01	
Registered electors				
AAP gain from BJP		Swing	+29.17	

=== 2013 ===
Delhi Assembly elections, 2013: Palam
Party	Candidate	Votes	%	±%
BJP	Dharm Dev Solanki	42,833	33.30	−10.82
AAP	Bhavna Gaur	34,661	26.79	
BSP	Madan Mohan	24,862	19.33	−3.44
INC	Vinay Mishra	19,531	15.18	−15.29
NYP	Neeraj Kr Sharma	3,631	2.82	
NOTA	None	903	0.70	
Majority		8,372	6.51	−7.14
Turnout		1,28,822	63.14	
Registered electors				
BJP hold		Swing	-10.82	

=== 2008 ===
Delhi Assembly elections, 2008: Palam
Party	Candidate	Votes	%	±%
BJP	Dharam Dev Solanki	40,712	44.12	−3.83
INC	Mahender Yadav	28,119	30.47	−14.93
BSP	Madan Mohan	21,014	22.77	+18.92
CPI	Bhairav Dutt Dhyani	659	0.71	
Independent	Mahesh Kumar	600	0.65	−0.57
SAP	Chanchal Sharma	349	0.38	
LJP	Mohan Pal Sankhla	307	0.33	
Independent	Pawan Kumar	259	0.28	
RJSP	Deepak Kumar	258	0.28	
Majority		12,593	13.65	+11.10
Turnout		92,277	58.8	+10.03
BJP hold		Swing	-3.83	

=== 2003 ===
Delhi Assembly elections, 2003: Palam
Party	Candidate	Votes	%	±%
BJP	Dharam Dev Solanki	43,521	47.95	+7.58
INC	Sumesh	41,204	45.40	−3.22
BSP	L C Sharma	3,496	3.85	+1.04
Independent	Harish Chander Jha	488	0.54	
RSP(U)	Anil Kumar Chand	463	0.51	
JD(U)	Govind Singh Negi	361	0.40	
Independent	Virendar	263	0.29	
LP(S)	Kirpa Shankar Verma	244	0.27	
Independent	Mam Chand Singh	170	0.19	
Independent	Rajpal Singh Khokhar	166	0.18	
AD(K)	Kiran Brahmi	151	0.17	
IJP	Stephen Verghese	82	0.09	
Independent	Mahesh Kumar	73	0.08	
Independent	Krishan Lal	72	0.08	
Majority		2,317	2.55	−5.70
Turnout		90,754	48.77	+2.46
BJP hold		Swing	+7.58	

=== 1998 ===
Delhi Assembly elections, 1998: Palam
Party	Candidate	Votes	%	±%
INC	Mahender Yadav	32,699	48.62	+15.49
BJP	Dharam Dev Solanki	27,152	40.37	−0.86
Independent	Jasbir Singh Solanki	2,196	3.27	
BSP	Sarnam Singh Pal	1,889	2.81	+0.35
RJD	Mahender Yadav	1,869	2.78	
Independent	Avdesh Tiwari	829	1.23	
JD	Shivan Bansal	473	0.70	+20.55
Independent	Ram Swaroop	126	0.19	
Independent	Parveen Kumar	25	0.04	
Majority		5,547	8.25	+0.15
Turnout		67,258	46.31	−12.20
INC hold		Swing	+15.49	

=== 1993 ===
Delhi Assembly elections, 1993: Palam
Party	Candidate	Votes	%	±%
BJP	Dharam Dev Solanki	20,671	41.23	
INC	Mukhtyar Singh	16,613	33.13	
JD	Sukhbir Singh Solanki	10,655	21.25	
BSP	Tikam Singh	1,233	2.46	
Independent	Ram Rattan Doohan	336	0.67	
JP	Raj Kumar	204	0.41	
DPP	Madhav Pathak	162	0.32	
Mukt Bharat	Randhir Singh	82	0.16	
Independent	Rama Shankar Singh	73	0.15	
Independent	Sukhbir Singh	60	0.12	
Doordarshi Party	Shyam Sunder	49	0.10	
Majority		4,058	8.10	
Turnout		50,138	58.51	
BJP hold		Swing		
