= Deoli, Delhi Assembly constituency =

Constituency of the Delhi legislative assembly in India

Coordinates: 28.502°N 77.230°E

Deoli
- Constituency No. 47 for the Delhi Legislative Assembly

Constituency details
- Country: India
- Region: North India
- State: Delhi
- District: South Delhi
- Established: 2008
- Reservation: SC

Member of Legislative Assembly
- 8th Delhi Legislative Assembly
- Incumbent Prem Chauhan
- Party: AAP
- Elected year: 2025

Deoli Assembly constituency is one of the 70 Delhi Legislative Assembly constituencies of the National Capital Territory in northern India.

== Overview ==
Present geographical structure of Deoli constituency came into existence in 2008 as a part of the implementation of the recommendations of the Delimitation Commission of India constituted in 2002. Deoli is part of South Delhi Lok Sabha constituency along with nine other Assembly segments, namely, Bijwasan, Sangam Vihar, Ambedkar Nagar, Chhatarpur, Kalkaji, Tughlakabad, Palam, Badarpur and Mehrauli.

== Members of the Legislative Assembly ==
Election	Name	Party
2008	Arvinder Singh Lovely	Indian National Congress
2013	Prakash Jarwal	Aam Aadmi Party
2015	Prakash Jarwal	Aam Aadmi Party
2020	Prakash Jarwal	Aam Aadmi Party
2025	Prem Chauhan	Aam Aadmi Party

== Election results ==
=== 2025 ===
Delhi Assembly elections, 2025: Deoli
Party	Candidate	Votes	%	±%
AAP	Prem Kumar Chauhan	86,889	55.09	
LJP(RV)	Deepak Tanwar	50,209	31.83	
INC	Rajesh Chauhan	12,211	7.74	
BSP	Asmita	2,581	1.64	
Majority		36,680	13.26	
Turnout		1,57,734		
AAP hold		Swing		

=== 2020 ===
Delhi Assembly elections, 2020: Deoli
Party	Candidate	Votes	%	±%
AAP	Prakash Jarwal	92,575	61.59	−9.02
BJP	Arvind Kumar	52,402	34.86	+11.02
INC	Arvinder Singh Lovely	2,711	1.80	−1.83
BSP	Ravi Kumar	620	0.61	−0.54
None of the Above	None of the Above	703	0.47	+0.10
Majority		40,173	26.73	−20.04
Turnout		1,50,388	63.53	−4.06
AAP hold		Swing	-9.02	

=== 2015 ===
Delhi Assembly elections, 2015: Deoli
Party	Candidate	Votes	%	±%
AAP	Prakash Jarwal	96,530	70.61	+26.96
BJP	Arvind Kumar	32,593	23.84	−5.35
INC	Rajesh Chauhan	4,968	3.63	−17.46
BSP	Dalchand Kapil	1,569	1.15	−2.48
NOTA	None of the above	502	0.37	−0.34
Majority		63,937	46.77	+32.31
Turnout		1,36,721	67.59	+15.55
AAP hold		Swing	+26.96	

=== 2013 ===
Delhi Assembly elections, 2013: Deoli
Party	Candidate	Votes	%	±%
AAP	Prakash Jarwal	51,646	43.65	New
BJP	Gagan Rana	34,538	29.19	+5.48
INC	Arvinder Singh Lovely	26,140	22.09	−21.32
BSP	Kishor Kumar Rajora	4,419	3.73	−22.29
NOTA	None of the above	838	0.71	New
Majority		17,108	14.46	−2.93
Turnout		1,18,364	64.22	+23.80
AAP gain from INC		Swing	+43.65	

=== 2008 ===
Delhi Assembly elections, 2008: Deoli
Party	Candidate	Votes	%	±%
INC	Arvinder Singh Lovely	41,497	43.41	
BSP	Shri Lal	24,869	26.02	
BJP	Bhim Singh	22,661	23.71	
LJP	Dal Chand Kapil	4,758	4.98	
IND	Rakesh Kumar	1,244	1.30	
Majority		16,628	17.39	
Turnout		95,587	56.40	
INC win (new seat)				

== See also ==
Deoli, Delhi
