= Arvinder Singh Lovely (politician, born 1965) =

Indian politician (1965–2021)

- Arvinder Singh C.

Member of the Delhi Legislative Assembly
- In office 2008–2013
- Succeeded by: Prakash Jarwal
- Constituency: Deoli

Personal details
- Born: 3 January 1965 Ludhiana, Punjab, India
- Died: 1 November 2021 (aged 56) Delhi, India
- Citizenship: Indian
- Party: Indian National Congress (2008–2015, 2020–2021)
- Other political affiliations: Bharatiya Janata Party (2015–2019)
- Spouse: Alka Singh
- Children: 2
- Parent: Buta Singh (father)
- Occupation: Businessman

Arvinder Singh C. (3 January 1965 – 1 November 2021) was an Indian politician who served as a Member of the Delhi Legislative Assembly representing the Deoli constituency. He was not to be confused with the Gandhinagar MLA of a similar name.

He was elected as MLA from Deoli in 2008 on an Indian National Congress ticket. In 2015, he joined the Bharatiya Janata Party after Congress declined a ticket to his father, Buta Singh.

He left the BJP in 2019 and rejoined the Indian National Congress. In 2020, he contested the Delhi Assembly election again from Deoli on a Congress ticket but was unsuccessful.

== Political career ==
Arvinder Singh was born to former minister and veteran Congress leader Buta Singh, in a Scheduled Caste Sikh family. In the 2008 Delhi Assembly elections, Congress gave him a ticket from Deoli. His father, who was the Chairman of National Commission for Scheduled Castes at that time, took leave from work to campaign for him. He achieved a surprise victory, defeating BSP's Sreelal by a big margin of 16,627 votes.

In 2010, he raised the issue of reservation for scheduled castes in Delhi Sikh Gurdwara Management Committee. The proposal was shot down by his namesake Arvinder Singh Lovely, who was the Delhi Gurudwara election and administration minister at that time.

In the 2013 Delhi Assembly elections, he was defeated by Prakash Jarwal of AAP. In 2015, he left Congress to join BJP. but returned to Congress in 2020.

== Death ==
He died due to cardiac arrest in November 2021.
