= Gajender Yadav =

Indian politician

Gajainder Yadav

Member of Delhi Legislative Assembly
- Incumbent
- Assumed office 2025
- Preceded by: Naresh Yadav
- Constituency: Mehrauli

Personal details
- Party: Bharatiya Janata Party

Gajender Yadav (born 1977) is an Indian politician from Delhi. He was elected as a Member of the Legislative Assembly in the 8th Delhi Assembly representing Bharatiya Janata Party from Mehrauli Assembly constituency in South Delhi district.

== Early life and education ==
Gajainder Yadav is from Mehrauli, Delhi. He is the son of Mohlad Singh. He graduated from Aurobindo college, University of Delhi. Also he completed his masters degree in political science in 2018 at a college affiliated with Swami Swami Vivekanand Subharti University, Meerut. Earlier, he did a post graduate diploma in management at Makhanlal Chaturvedi National University of Journalism and Communication, Bhopal in 2006. He declared assets over Rs.30,000,000 before the 2025 election.

== Career ==
Yadav won from Mehrauli Assembly constituency representing the Bharatiya Janata Party in the 2025 Delhi Legislative Assembly election. He polled 48,349 votes and defeated his nearest rival, Mahender Chaudhary of the Aam Aadmi Party, by a margin of 1,782 votes.
