= Sangam Vihar Assembly constituency =

Constituency of the Delhi legislative assembly in India

Coordinates: 28.499°N 77.240°E

Sangam Vihar
- Constituency No. 49 for the Delhi Legislative Assembly

Constituency details
- Country: India
- Region: North India
- State: Delhi
- District: South Delhi
- Established: 2009
- Reservation: None

Member of Legislative Assembly
- 8th Delhi Legislative Assembly
- Incumbent Chandan Kumar Choudhary
- Party: Bharatiya Janata Party
- Elected year: 2025

Sangam Vihar Assembly constituency is one of the 70 Delhi Legislative Assembly constituencies of the National Capital Territory in northern India.

== Overview ==
Present boundaries of Sangam Vihar constituency came into existence in 2008 as a part of the implementation of the recommendations of the Delimitation Commission of India constituted in 2002. Sangam Vihar is part of South Delhi Lok Sabha constituency along with nine other Assembly segments, namely, Bijwasan, Ambedkar Nagar, Chhatarpur, Deoli, Kalkaji, Tughlakabad, Palam, Badarpur and Mehrauli.

== Members of Legislative Assembly ==
Year	Member	Party
2008	Shiv Charan Lal Gupta	Bharatiya Janata Party
2013	Dinesh Mohaniya	Aam Aadmi Party
2015	Dinesh Mohaniya	Aam Aadmi Party
2020	Dinesh Mohaniya	Aam Aadmi Party
2025	Chandan Kumar Choudhary	Bharatiya Janata Party

== Election results ==
=== 2025 ===
Delhi Assembly elections, 2025: Sangam Vihar
Party	Candidate	Votes	%	±%
BJP	Chandan Kumar Choudhary	54,049	42.99	▲17.26
AAP	Dinesh Mohaniya	53,705	42.72	▼21.86
INC	Harsh Chaudhary	15,863	12.62	▲10.40
NOTA	None of the above	537	0.43	▼0.32
Majority		344	0.27	▼36.17
Turnout		125,714		
BJP gain from AAP		Swing		

=== 2020 ===
Delhi Assembly elections, 2020: Sangam Vihar
Party	Candidate	Votes	%	±%
AAP	Dinesh Mohaniya	75,345	64.58	▼1.37
JD(U)	Shiv Charan Gupta	32,823	28.13	New
BSP	Suresh Chaudhary	2,930	2.50	▼0.27
INC	Poonam Azad	2,604	2.22	▼0.9
NOTA	None of the above	872	0.75	+0.33
Majority		42,522	36.44	−3.77
Turnout		1,17,577	62.20	−4.48
AAP hold		Swing	-1.37	

=== 2015 ===
Delhi Assembly elections, 2015: Sangam Vihar
Party	Candidate	Votes	%	±%
AAP	Dinesh Mohaniya	72,131	65.95	+38.08
BJP	Dr. Shiv Charan Lal Gupta	28,143	25.73	−1.27
INC	Vishan Swaroop Agarwal	3,423	3.13	−15.30
BSP	Shish Pal Singh	3,146	2.87	−8.18
NOTA	None of the above	467	0.42	+0.09
Majority		43,988	40.22	+39.35
Turnout		1,09,373	66.68	
AAP hold		Swing	+37.45	

=== 2013 ===
Delhi Assembly elections, 2013: Sangam Vihar
Party	Candidate	Votes	%	±%
AAP	Dinesh Mohaniya	24,851	27.87	New
BJP	Dr. Shiv Charan Lal Gupta	24,074	27.00	−0.37
INC	Jag Parvesh	16,435	18.43	−4.11
BSP	Vir Singh	9,850	11.05	−4.68
JD(U)	Shish Pal Singh	9,010	10.10	+9.96
IND	Dasharth Chohan	1,500	1.68	
NOTA	None of the above	298	0.33	
Majority		777	0.87	−3.96
Turnout		89,167	64.95	
AAP gain from BJP		Swing		

=== 2008 ===
Delhi Assembly elections, 2008: Sangam Vihar
Party	Candidate	Votes	%	±%
BJP	Shiv Charan Lal Gupta	20,332	27.37	
INC	Amod Kumar Kanth	16,743	22.54	
BSP	Ranjit Singh	11,687	15.73	
NCP	Vir Singh	10,577	14.24	
SP	A K Gupta	9,665	13.01	
LJP	Suresh Choudhary	2,975	4.01	
Majority		3,589	4.83	
Turnout		74,281	51.40	
BJP win (new seat)				
