= Chhatarpur, Delhi Assembly constituency =

Legislative assembly seat in Delhi

Coordinates: 28.496°N 77.186°E

Chhatarpur
- Constituency No. 46 for the Delhi Legislative Assembly

Constituency details
- Country: India
- Region: North India
- Union Territory: Delhi
- District: South Delhi
- Established: 2008
- Reservation: None

Member of Legislative Assembly
- 8th Delhi Legislative Assembly
- Incumbent Kartar Singh Tanwar
- Party: Bhartiya Janata Party
- Elected year: 2025

Chhatarpur is one of the 70 Delhi Legislative Assembly constituencies of the National Capital Territory in northern India.

== Overview ==
Present geographical structure of Chhatarpur constituency came into existence in 2008 as a part of the implementation of the recommendations of the Delimitation Commission of India constituted in 2002. Chhatarpur is part of South Delhi Lok Sabha constituency along with nine other Assembly segments, namely, Bijwasan, Sangam Vihar, Ambedkar Nagar, Deoli, Kalkaji, Tughlakabad, Palam, Badarpur and Mehrauli.

== Members of the Legislative Assembly ==
Election	Name	Party
2008	Balram Tanwar	Indian National Congress
2013	Brahm Singh Tanwar	Bharatiya Janata Party
2015	Kartar Singh Tanwar	Aam Aadmi Party
2020	Kartar Singh Tanwar	Aam Aadmi Party
2025	Kartar Singh Tanwar	Bharatiya Janata Party

== Election results ==
=== 2025 ===
Delhi Assembly elections, 2025: Chhatarpur
Party	Candidate	Votes	%	±%
BJP	Kartar Singh Tanwar	80,469	48.98	
AAP	Brahm Singh Tanwar	74,230	45.18	
INC	Rajender Tanwar	6,601	4.02	
NOTA	None of the above	868	0.53	
Majority		6,239	3.80	
Turnout		1,64,299		
BJP gain from AAP		Swing		

=== 2020 ===
Delhi Assembly elections, 2020: Chhatarpur
Party	Candidate	Votes	%	±%
AAP	Kartar Singh Tanwar	69,411	49.13	−5.16
BJP	Brahm Singh Tanwar	65,691	46.15	+9.71
INC	Satish Lohia	3,874	2.74	−4.75
NOTA	None of the above	707	0.50	+0.07
BSP	Suraj Bharti	369	0.26	−0.14
NCP	Rana Sujeet Singh	177	0.13	
Majority		3,720	2.65	−15.20
Turnout		1,41,283	64.59	−2.75
AAP hold		Swing	-5.16	

=== 2015 ===
Delhi Assembly elections, 2015: Chhatarpur
Party	Candidate	Votes	%	±%
AAP	Kartar Singh Tanwar	67,644	54.29	+34.10
BJP	Brahm Singh Tanwar	45,405	36.44	−8.63
INC	Balram Tanwar	9,339	7.49	−23.04
NOTA	None of the above	547	0.43	−0.22
Majority		22,240	17.85	+3.31
Turnout		1,24,640	67.34	
AAP gain from BJP		Swing	+29.79	

=== 2013 ===
Delhi Assembly elections, 2013: Chhatarpur
Party	Candidate	Votes	%	±%
BJP	Brahm Singh Tanwar	49,975	45.07	+13.63
INC	Balram Tanwar	33,851	30.53	−6.69
AAP	Rishi Pal	22,285	20.10	
BSP	Amit Kumar	2,507	2.26	−27.02
NOTA	None of the above	718	0.65	
Majority		16,124	14.54	+8.76
Turnout		1,10,879	66.12	
BJP hold		Swing	+13.63	

=== 2008 ===
Delhi Assembly elections, 2008: Chhatarpur
Party	Candidate	Votes	%	±%
INC	Balram Tanwar	32,406	37.22	
BJP	Brahm Singh Tanwar	27,376	31.44	
BSP	Kanwar Singh Tanwar	25,492	29.28	
Majority		5,030	5.78	
Turnout		87,077	56.00	
INC win (new seat)				

== See also ==
- Chhattarpur Temple
- Chhattarpur (Delhi Metro)
