= Mehrauli Assembly constituency =

Constituency of the Delhi legislative assembly in India

Coordinates: 28.520°N 77.180°E

Mehrauli
- Constituency No. 45 for the Delhi Legislative Assembly

Constituency details
- Country: India
- Region: North India
- State: Delhi
- District: South Delhi
- Established: 1993
- Reservation: None

Member of Legislative Assembly
- 8th Delhi Legislative Assembly
- Incumbent Gajendra Singh Yadav
- Party: Bharatiya Janata Party
- Elected year: 2025

Mehrauli Assembly constituency is one of the 70 Delhi Legislative Assembly constituencies of the National Capital Territory in northern India.

== Overview ==
Present geographical structure of Mehrauli constituency came into existence in 2008 as a part of the implementation of the recommendations of the Delimitation Commission of India constituted in 2002. Mehrauli is part of South Delhi Lok Sabha constituency along with nine other Assembly segments, namely, Bijwasan, Sangam Vihar, Ambedkar Nagar, Chhatarpur, Deoli, Kalkaji, Tughlakabad, Palam and Badarpur.

== Members of the Legislative Assembly ==
Year	Member	Party
1993	Brahm Singh Tanwar	Bharatiya Janata Party
1998	Brahm Singh Tanwar	Bharatiya Janata Party
2003	Balram Tanwar	Indian National Congress
2008	Yoganand Shastri	Indian National Congress
2013	Parvesh Verma	Bharatiya Janata Party
2015	Naresh Yadav	Aam Aadmi Party
2020	Naresh Yadav	Aam Aadmi Party
2025	Gajender Yadav	Bharatiya Janata Party

== Election results ==
=== 2025 ===
Delhi Assembly elections, 2025: Mehrauli
Party	Candidate	Votes	%	±%
BJP	Gajender Yadav	48,349	41.65	
AAP	A. A. Mahender Chaudhary	46,567	40.11	
Independent	Balyogi Balaknath Ji Maharaj	9,731	8.38	
INC	Pushpa Singh	9,338	8.04	
NOTA	None of the above	846	0.72	
Majority		1,782	1.53	
Turnout		1,16,072		
BJP gain from AAP		Swing		

=== 2020 ===
Delhi Assembly elections, 2020: Mehrauli
Party	Candidate	Votes	%	±%
AAP	Naresh Yadav	62,417	54.27	+3.21
BJP	Kusum Khatri	44,256	38.48	+2.31
INC	A. A. Mahender Chaudhary	6,952	6.04	−4.55
NOTA	None of the above	593	0.52	+0.04
BSP	Kamal Singh	470	0.41	−0.07
AIFB	D K Chopra	163	0.14	
Majority		18,161	15.79	+0.90
Turnout		1,15,008	56.68	−6.08
AAP hold		Swing	+3.21	

=== 2015 ===
Delhi Assembly elections, 2015: Mehrauli
Party	Candidate	Votes	%	±%
AAP	Naresh Yadav	58,125	51.06	+17.05
BJP	Sarita Chaudhary	41,174	36.17	−2.55
INC	Satbir Singh	12,065	10.59	−11.62
BSP	Saroj Verma	550	0.48	−2.79
NOTA	None of the above	553	0.48	−0.20
Majority		16,951	14.89	+10.16
Turnout		1,13,838	62.76	
AAP gain from BJP		Swing	+15.78	

=== 2013 ===
Delhi Assembly elections, 2013: Mehrauli
Party	Candidate	Votes	%	±%
BJP	Parvesh Sahib Singh Verma	37,481	38.72	+7.57
AAP	Narinder Singh Sejwal	32,917	34.01	
INC	Dr Yoganand Shastri	21,494	22.21	−10.62
BSP	Surender Kumar	3,170	3.27	−5.33
NOTA	None	657	0.68	
Majority		4,564	4.72	+3.04
Turnout		96,838	62.06	
BJP gain from INC		Swing	+7.57	

=== 2008 ===
Delhi Assembly elections, 2008: Mehrauli
Party	Candidate	Votes	%	±%
INC	Dr. Yoganand Shastri	21,740	32.83	−23.65
BJP	Sher Singh Dagar	20,632	31.15	−9.11
Independent	Satbir Singh	14,954	22.58	
BSP	Ved Prakash	5,697	8.60	+7.51
NCP	Jagdish Singh Lohia	1,892	2.86	
Majority		1,108	1.68	−14.54
Turnout		66,224	45.9	−10.47
INC hold		Swing	-23.65	

=== 2003 ===
Delhi Assembly elections, 2003: Mehrauli
Party	Candidate	Votes	%	±%
INC	Balram Tanwar	40,595	56.48	+22.95
BJP	Brahm Singh Tanwar	28,939	40.26	+2.82
Independent	Raghvinder Bakshi (NETA JI)	6410	9.10	+9.10
Majority		11,656	16.22	+12.31
Turnout		75,994	56.37	+4.49
INC hold		Swing	+22.95	

=== 1998 ===
Delhi Assembly elections, 1998: Mehrauli
Party	Candidate	Votes	%	±%
BJP	Brahm Singh Tanwar	24,996	37.44	−8.83
Independent	Balram Tanwar	22,389	33.53	
INC	Vijay Deep	17,427	26.10	−6.85
Majority		2,607	3.91	−9.41
Turnout		66,765	51.88	−9.70
BJP hold		Swing	-8.83	

=== 1993 ===
Delhi Assembly elections, 1993: Mehrauli
Party	Candidate	Votes	%	±%
BJP	Brahm Singh Tanwar	24,396	46.27	
INC	Balram Tanwar	17,375	32.95	
JD	Nathu Singh	8,889	16.86	
CPI	Sri Chand	1,355	2.57	
Majority		7,021	13.32	
Turnout		52,725	61.58	
BJP hold		Swing		

== See also ==
Mehrauli
