= Ashutosh (journalist) =

Indian journalist and former politician

Ashutosh Gupta
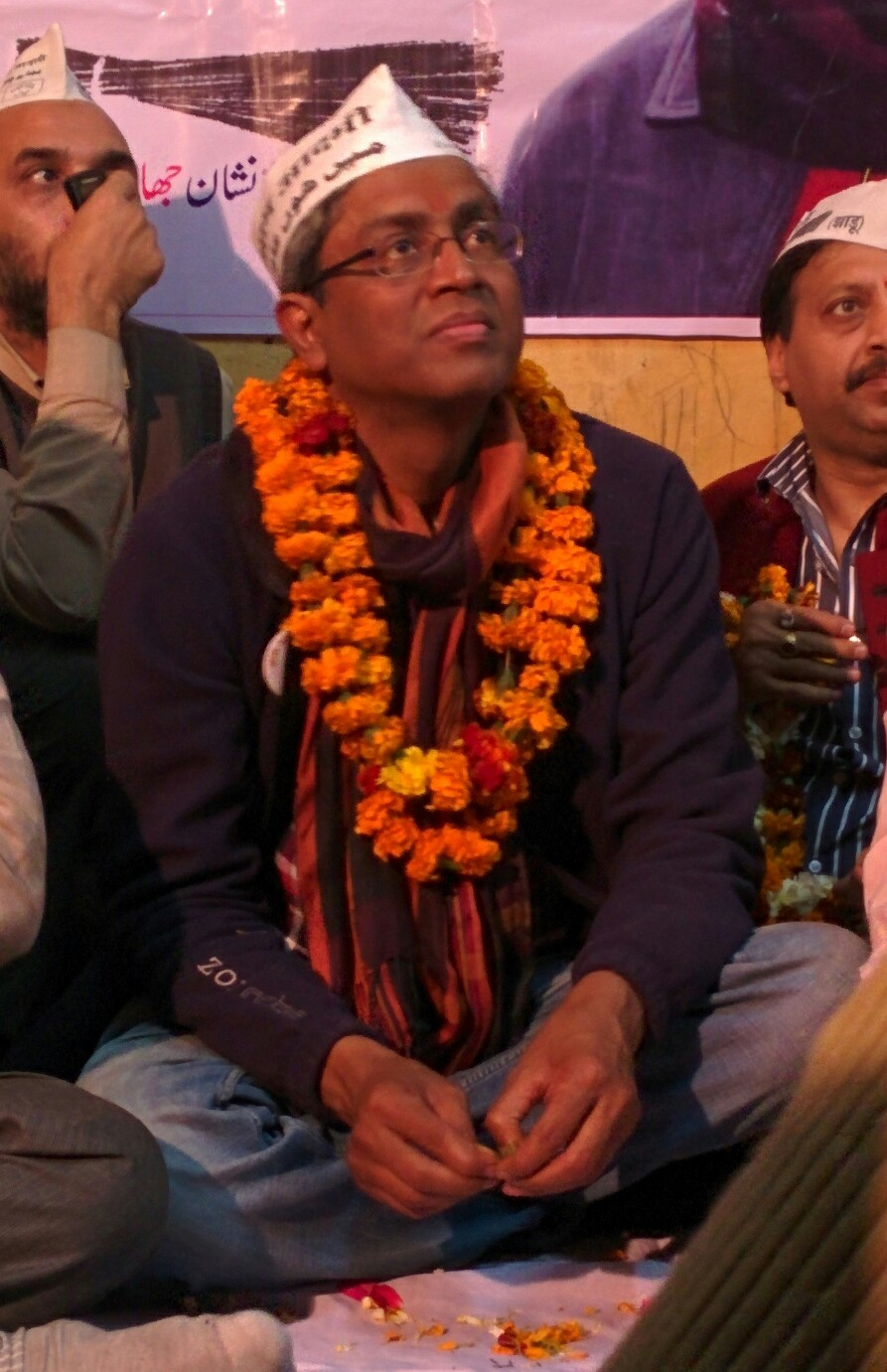
- Born: Ashutosh Gupta; 1965 (age 60–61); Varanasi, Uttar Pradesh, India
- Occupation: Journalist

Ashutosh (born 1965) is an Indian journalist and former politician of AAP. He was the spokesperson of the Aam Aadmi Party. He is the Co-founder and Editorial Director of SatyaHindi, He was previously associated with IBN 7, an Indian news television channel, as a News anchor and managing editor. On 15 August 2018 Ashutosh resigned from Aam Aadmi Party citing his personal reasons.

== Early life and education ==
Ashutosh Gupta was born in 1965 in Varanasi, where his father Mr S N Lal Gupta was an officer. He graduated in science from Allahabad University. He earned an M.Phil. (Social Studies) and M.A. (Politics & International Studies) from Jawahar Lal Nehru University, New Delhi.

== Political career ==
He was among close confidants of Arvind Kejriwal when the group was part of Anna Hazare's anti-corruption movement. Against Hazare's wishes, the group floated a political outfit named Aam Adami Party. The party did well in Delhi Vidhan Sabha polls in 2013 and formed government with outside support by Congress. But soon Kejriwal resigned. The party lost all 7 seats to BJP in Delhi in 2014 Lok Sabha polls. Ashutosh contested the 2014 Lok Sabha elections from Chandni Chowk against Kapil Sibal of Congress and Harsh Vardhan of the BJP. He garnered more votes than Kapil Sibal of the Congress, but lost out to Dr Harsh Vardhan of the BJP.

Aam Admi Party swept to power winning 67 out of 70 seats for Delhi Vidhan Sabha in February 2015. But several top leaders did not contest the polls themselves and concentrated on strategy. Yogendra Yadav, Prashant Bhushan, Ashutosh, Atishi Marlena were among the main leaders who did not contest the elections.

== Books ==
Ashutosh has written a book on Anna Hazare's August 2011 movement, against Corruption. The book is titled 'Anna: 13 Days That Awakened India'. A new book named 'The Crown Prince, the Gladiator and the Hope: Battle for Change' was released in February 2015. The book is based on the story of politics on 2014. Another book titled 'Mukhote ka Rajdharm' written by Ashutosh was published in 2015.
