= Prakash Jarwal =

Indian politician

Member of the Delhi Legislative Assembly
- In office 2013–2025
- Preceded by: Arvinder Singh Lovely
- Succeeded by: Prem Chauhan
- Constituency: Deoli

Personal details
- Party: AAP
- Education: M.Com. (University of Delhi)

Prakash Jarwal is an Indian politician from the Aam Aadmi Party, formerly represented Deoli constituency in the Delhi State Legislature.

== About ==
Jarwal is the youngest candidate of Aam Aadmi Party, 25 years old. Jarwal has left his job of assistant manager in a multinational company, to join the anti-Corruption movement and later AAP. Jarwal has been jailed for an alleged assault on a Delhi Jal Board junior engineer.

On 21 July 2017, Jarwal was booked for molesting and harassing a woman who was allegedly a member of the Rashtravadi Janata Party.

On 20 February 2018, an assault case was filed by Delhi Chief Secretary Anshu Prakash against Jarwal and fellow legislator Amanatullah Khan for allegedly slapping and abusing him at the residence of Chief Minister Arvind Kejriwal. He was granted bail on 9 March. In 2021, a Delhi court dismissed the assault case filed by the Delhi bureaucrat against Kejriwal and ten AAP MLAs and discharged them of all charges. The court noted that "no prima facie case" was made against them.

On 18 April 2020, a 52-year-old doctor, Rajendra Singh, had allegedly committed suicide, holding Jarwal responsible in his suicide note following which police had registered a case against the legislator on charges of extortion and abetment to suicide.

== Electoral performance ==
Delhi Assembly elections, 2013: Deoli
Party	Candidate	Votes	%	±%
AAP	Prakash Jarwal	51,646	43.65	New
BJP	Gagan Rana	34,538	29.19	+5.48
INC	Arvinder Singh Lovely	26,140	22.09	−21.32
BSP	Kishor Kumar Rajora	4,419	3.73	−22.29
NOTA	None of the above	838	0.71	New
Majority		17,108	14.46	−2.93
Turnout		1,18,364	64.22	+23.80
AAP gain from INC		Swing	+43.65	

Delhi Assembly elections, 2015: Deoli
Party	Candidate	Votes	%	±%
AAP	Prakash Jarwal	96,530	70.61	+26.96
BJP	Arvind Kumar	32,593	23.84	−5.35
INC	Rajesh Chauhan	4,968	3.63	−17.46
BSP	Dalchand Kapil	1,569	1.15	−2.48
NOTA	None of the above	502	0.37	−0.34
Majority		63,937	46.77	+32.31
Turnout		1,36,721	67.59	+15.55
AAP hold		Swing	+26.96	

Delhi Assembly elections, 2020: Deoli
Party	Candidate	Votes	%	±%
AAP	Prakash Jarwal	92,575	61.59	−9.02
BJP	Arvind Kumar	52,402	34.86	+11.02
INC	Arvinder Singh Lovely	2,711	1.80	−1.83
BSP	Ravi Kumar	620	0.61	−0.54
None of the Above	None of the Above	703	0.47	+0.10
Majority		40,173	26.73	−20.04
Turnout		1,50,388	63.53	−4.06
AAP hold		Swing	-9.02	

Delhi Assembly elections, 2025: Deoli
Party	Candidate	Votes	%	±%
AAP	Prem Kumar Chauhan	86,889	55.09	
LJP(RV)	Deepak Tanwar	50,209	31.83	
INC	Rajesh Chauhan	12,211	7.74	
BSP	Asmita	2,581	1.64	
Majority		36,680	13.26	
Turnout		1,57,734		
AAP hold		Swing		

State Legislative Assembly
Preceded by ?	Member of the Delhi Legislative Assembly from Deoli, Delhi Assembly constituency 2020– 2025	Succeeded by Prem Chauhan
