= Sahi Ram =

Indian politician (born 1959)

Member of the Legislative Assembly
- Incumbent
- Assumed office December 2013
- Preceded by: Ramesh Bidhuri
- Constituency: Tughlakabad

Member of the Legislative Assembly
- In office Dec 2015 – Nov 2020
- Preceded by: Ramesh Bidhuri
- Constituency: Tughlaqabad (Delhi Assembly constituency)

Personal details
- Born: 10 October 1959 (age 67) Delhi, India
- Party: Aam Aadmi Party
- Spouse: Late Smt. Balesh (wife)
- Children: 3 sons
- Education: Government Boys Senior Secondary School, Badarpur
- Profession: Politician

Sahi Ram is an Indian politician and a member of the Sixth Legislative Assembly of Delhi and re-elected to Seventh Legislative Assembly of Delhi and Eighth Legislative Assembly of Delhi in India. He represents the Tughlakabad constituency of Delhi and is a member of the Aam Aadmi Party political party. He won from Tughlakabad Assembly on an Aam Aadmi Party Ticket in the years 2015, 2025 & 2025.

== Early life and education ==
Sahi Ram was born in Delhi on 10 October 1959. He was brought up in Tekhand Village, Delhi. He attended the Government Boys Senior Secondary School in Badarpur and was educated to tenth grade.

== Political career ==
Sahi Ram is a three Term MLA, representing the Tughlakabad constituency in the Sixth, Seventh and Eighth Delhi Legislative Assembly. He is a member of the Aam Aadmi Party.

In 2013, Sahi Ram was elected as Deputy Mayor of South Delhi Municipal Corporation. Also, he was elected as two times Councillor.

Sahi Ram unsuccessfully from South Delhi Constituency in 2024 Elections.

== Convictions ==
Sahi Ram was first convicted under West Bengal Prevention of Defacement Property Act 1976 in July 1998.

In July 2017, he was convicted for a second time of the offences punishable under sections 324 (voluntarily causing hurt by sharp object), 341 (wrongfully restrain) and 34 (common intention) of Indian Penal Code.

== Posts held ==
#	From	To	Position	Comments
01	2015	2020	Member, Sixth Legislative Assembly of Delhi	
02	2020	2025	Member, Seventh Legislative Assembly of Delhi	
03	2025	-	Member, Eighth Legislative Assembly of Delhi	
04	April 2013	April 2014	Deputy Mayor, South Delhi Municipal Corporation	
05	2012	2015	Councillor, Municipal Corporation of Delhi	
06	2007	2012	Councillor, Municipal Corporation of Delhi	

== Electoral performance ==
Delhi Assembly elections, 2020: Tughlakabad
Party	Candidate	Votes	%	±%
AAP	Sahi Ram	58,905	54.51	−7.89
BJP	Vikram Bidhuri	45,147	41.77	+12.07
INC	Shubham Sharma	1,342	1.24	−2.90
BSP	Manoj Kumar Ray	1,316	1.23	−0.72
NOTA	None of the above	384	0.36	−0.01
Majority		13,757	12.73	−13.14
Turnout		1,08,098	60.84	−5.53
AAP hold		Swing		

State Legislative Assembly
Preceded by ?	Member of the Delhi Legislative Assembly from Tughlakabad Assembly constituency 2020–	Incumbent
