= Bagdola =

Bagdola is a village located in Sector-8 Dwarka New Delhi. Pin code of Bagdola is 110077. This village is dominated by Yadav community.

== See also ==
- Najafgarh
