= Harmeet Singh Kalka =

Indian politician

Harmeet Singh Kalka (born 23 August 1968) is an Indian politician and a member of the Bharatiya Janata Party. Kalka is a former member of the Delhi Legislative Assembly from the Kalkaji constituency of South Delhi.

He is currently serving as President of Delhi Sikh Gurdwara Management Committee.
