= Prem Chauhan =

Indian politician

Councillor, South Delhi Municipal Corporation
- Incumbent
- Assumed office 8 February 2025
- Constituency: Deoli, Delhi

Personal details
- Born: Delhi, India
- Party: Aam Aadmi Party
- Occupation: Politician

Prem Chauhan is an Indian politician and a member of the Aam Aadmi Party (AAP). He is serving as a Member of the Delhi Legislative Assembly from Deoli Assembly constituency since 8 February 2025. He has served as a councillor in the South Delhi Municipal Corporation and has been actively involved in local governance.

== Political career ==
Prem Chauhan has been associated with the Aam Aadmi Party and has served as a councillor in the South Delhi Municipal Corporation. As a local representative, he has focused on civic issues, public services, and urban development in his area.

In 2025, Chauhan was contesting the Delhi Legislative Assembly elections from the Deoli constituency as an AAP candidate, aiming to represent the residents of the area in the Delhi Assembly and won.
