= Brahm Singh Tanwar =

Indian politician

Brahm Singh Tanwar (born: 7 July 1952) is an Indian politician. He is a former member of the Delhi Legislative Assembly, who joined Aam Aadmi Party in October 2024, after renouncing the membership of Bharatiya Janta Party.

== Political career ==
Tanwar was elected to the Delhi assembly in 1993 and 1998 from Mehrauli and in 2013 from Chhatarpur, Delhi Assembly constituency. He is a three-time Councillor and three-time BJP-MLA from South Delhi district. He has been a prominent leader of BJP since the foundation of the party and has been jailed in The Emergency (India).

He is a mass leader of Hindus in Delhi. He was also listed in Top 5 Richest Candidates of the 2020 Delhi Legislative Assembly election.

On 31 October 2024, Tanwar along with his associates, renounced the membership from Bhartiya Janata Party and joined Aam Aadmi Party in the presence of the party chief Arvind Kejriwal.
