= Kuldeep Solanki =

Indian politician

Member of the Delhi Legislative Assembly

Kuldeep Solanki (born 1967) is an Indian politician from Delhi. He is a member of the Delhi Legislative Assembly from Palam Assembly constituency in South West Delhi district. He won the 2025 Delhi Legislative Assembly election representing the Bharatiya Janata Party.

== Early life and education ==
Solanki is from Palam, New Delhi. He was born in 1967 into a Hindu Rajput family to late Ram Roop Solanki. He studied till Class 10 Government Boys Senior Secondary School, Delhi Cantonment, New Delhi and passed his matriculation examination in 1983. Later, he discontinued his studies. He declared assets of over Rs. 13 crore (Rs. 130 million) before the 2025 election.

== Career ==
Solanki won the Palam Assembly constituency representing the Bharatiya Janata Party in the 2025 Delhi Legislative Assembly election. He polled 82,046 votes and defeated his nearest competitor, Jogindar Solanki of the Aam Aadmi Party, by 8,952 votes.
