= Avinash Kaur =

Indian social activist (born 1966)

- Born: Avinash Kaur; 1 September 1966; Jalandhar, Punjab, India
- Occupations: General secretary of Delhi Pradesh mahila congress, Socialist, director at Delhi cooperative housing Finance corporation Ltd.

Avinash Kaur (born 1 September 1966) is an Indian socialist and a noted public figure. She is currently serving as general secretary of Delhi Pradesh Mahila Congress.

Kaur has been associated with the Indian National Congress committee for almost a decade, where she works for the empowerment of women in the country.

== Early life and background ==
Avinash Kaur was born in Jalandhar in India. Her grandfather, Babu Ram, was a freedom fighter and social reformer. Her father Gulzar Singh was a former active politician and retired deputy collector, while her mother, Prakash Kaur is ex-Vice President, Jila Parishad, Jalandhar. She received her Bachelor of Arts degree from the Guru Nanak Dev University in Jalandhar.

== Career ==
Hailing from the family of social reformers, Kaur started her career with working for several non-governmental organizations which work on serving women empowerment in India, for which she worked for almost a decade. Later, she was appointed a general secretary for Delhi Pradesh Mahila Congress which is the women's wing of All India Mahila Congress under Congress Party. Also, she works as a vice president at South Delhi District Congress Committee, Delhi. She is also working as director at Delhi Cooperative Housing Finance Cooperation Limited in Delhi.

== Activism ==
In 2011 Avinash Kaur became Member of Social Welfare Ministry, Government of NCT of Delhi. In 2013, after dedicating almost her entire life for the needs of underprivileged people, Avinash Kaur became Joint Secretary of Classic Sewa samiti which is a non government organisation aimed at empowerment of women and their participation in various sectors of the country. This NGO also works for needs of old age people through the development of old age homes.
