= Mahendra Yadav (Indian politician) =

Indian politician (died 2020)

Member of the Delhi Legislative Assembly
- In office November 1998 – December 2003
- Preceded by: Dharam Dev Solanki
- Succeeded by: Dharam Dev Solanki
- Constituency: Palam

Personal details
- Born: 1949-1950
- Died: 4 July 2020 New Delhi, India
- Cause of death: COVID-19
- Party: Indian National Congress

Mahendra Yadav (1949/1950 – 5 July 2020) was an Indian politician affiliated with the Indian National Congress. He was an MLA from Delhi's Palam constituency in 1998 and OBC category chairman. He was convicted in a 1984 anti-Sikh riots case and was sentenced to 10 years in prison.

== Death ==
Yadav died on 4 July 2020 at the age of 70 from COVID-19 during the COVID-19 pandemic in India. Mahendra Yadav was serving a 10-year prison sentence in jail 14 at Mandoli Jail, a sub-jail of Tihar Jail. After a prisoner died from COVID-19 on June 15, all 29 prisoners were tested, with 17 positive and 12 negative results. However, on June 25, the 12 negative prisoners were retested and 3, including Mahendra Yadav, tested positive. On June 26, Yadav felt unwell and experienced heart-related issues, and was taken to Deen Dayal Upadhyay Hospital before being transferred to Loknayak Jaiprakash Hospital. His family requested that he should be admitted to a private hospital under police protection and the jail administration granted their request. Yadav was admitted to Akash Health Care Hospital in Dwarka on June 30, where he died on July 4.

== See also ==
- 1984 anti-Sikh riots
