= Chandan Kumar Choudhary =

Indian politician

- चंदन कुमार चौधरी

Member of Delhi Legislative Assembly
- Incumbent
- Assumed office 08 February 2025
- Preceded by: Dinesh Mohaniya
- Constituency: Sangam Vihar

Municipal Councillor, Sangam Vihar-A
- In office 7 December 2022 – 08 February 2025
- Constituency: Sangam Vihar-A (Ward No. 163)

Personal details
- Party: Bharatiya Janata Party
- Occupation: Politician
- Known for: Winning the 2022 Delhi Municipal Corporation election
- Website: https://www.chandanchoudhary.in/

Chandan Kumar Choudhary is an Indian politician and a member of the Bharatiya Janata Party (BJP). In 2022, he was elected as a Councillor from the Sangam Vihar-A ward in the Municipal Corporation of Delhi election. In 2025, he was elected as a member of the Delhi Legislative Assembly from the Sangam Vihar constituency.

== Political career ==
Choudhary entered active politics through the BJP's Delhi unit and played a role in local governance. His electoral success in the 2022 MCD elections helped BJP retain its presence in the municipal body. As an MCD Councillor, he focused on local civic issues, sanitation, and infrastructure development in his ward.

In 2025, the BJP announced him as the candidate for Sangam Vihar in the Delhi Assembly elections against candidates from Aam Aadmi Party (AAP) and Indian National Congress (INC) and won.

== Electoral history ==
- 2022 Delhi Municipal Corporation election – Elected as MCD Councillor from Sangam Vihar-A (Ward No. 163)
- 2025 Delhi Legislative Assembly election – BJP MLA from Sangam Vihar
