= Atishi Marlena =

Former Chief Minister of Delhi

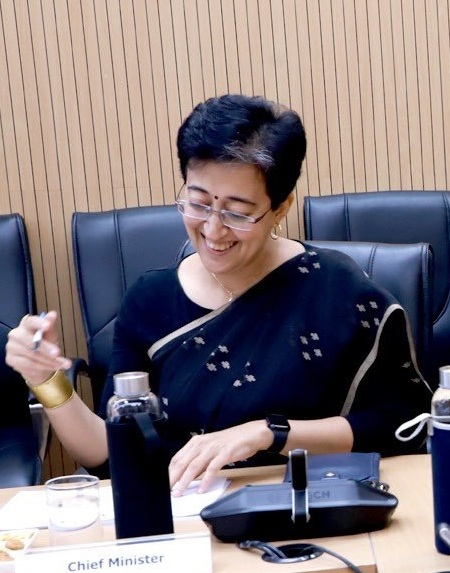
- Marlena in 2024

8th Leader of the Opposition in Delhi Legislative Assembly
- Incumbent
- Assumed office 23 February 2025
- Deputy: Anil Jha Vats
- Speaker: Vijender Gupta
- Preceded by: Vijender Gupta

8th Chief Minister of Delhi
- In office 21 September 2024 – 20 February 2025
- Lieutenant Governor: Vinai Kumar Saxena
- Preceded by: Arvind Kejriwal
- Succeeded by: Rekha Gupta

Cabinet Minister in Delhi
- In office 9 March 2023 – 17 September 2024
- Chief Minister: Arvind Kejriwal
- Ministry and Departments: Education; Women and Child Welfare; Culture; Tourism; Public Works Department
- Preceded by: Manish Sisodia
- Succeeded by: Rekha Gupta

Member of Delhi Legislative Assembly
- Incumbent
- Assumed office 12 February 2020
- Preceded by: Avtar Singh
- Constituency: Kalkaji

Personal details
- Born: Atishi Marlena Singh; 8 June 1981 (age 45) New Delhi, Delhi, India
- Party: Aam Aadmi Party
- Spouse: Pravin Singh
- Education: St. Stephen's College, Delhi (BA); University of Oxford (MA, MSc)
- Occupation: Politician

Atishi Marlena (Hindi: [ɑːtɪʃiː]; born Atishi Marlena Singh; 8 June 1981), better known mononymously as Atishi, is an Indian politician who served as the 8th Chief Minister of Delhi, the third female in the role, from 2024 to 2025 and also serving as leader of the house in legislative assembly. She belongs to the Aam Aadmi Party and is a member of its Political Affairs Committee, the governing body of the party. Prior to her appointment as the chief minister, she also served as the Minister of Education, P.W.D, Culture and Tourism in the Delhi Government. Previously, she served as advisor to the former Deputy Chief Minister of Delhi, Manish Sisodia, primarily on education, from July 2015 to 17 April 2018. Since 2025, she has been serving as 8th Leader of Opposition in the Delhi Legislative Assembly, the first woman in the role, following her election as the AAP's house leader.

== Early life and education ==
Atishi was born to Delhi University professors Vijay Singh and Tripta Wahi on 8 June 1981. Although she comes from a family of Punjabi background, just before the 2019 Indian general election, she dropped 'Marlena' from her surname to “not want to waste time in proving her identity.” She was given the middle name Marlena by her parents. According to her party, the name is a portmanteau of Marx and Lenin.

Atishi was raised in Delhi. She did her schooling at Springdales School, New Delhi. She graduated in Bachelor of Arts in History from the St. Stephen's College at the University of Delhi in 2001.

In 2003, she earned Master of Arts in History from University of Oxford and was on a Chevening scholarship. In 2005, she went to Magdalen College, Oxford and earned Master of Science in Educational Research as a Rhodes scholar.

== Political career ==
In January 2013, she became involved in policy formulation for the AAP, which has its roots in that movement.

She was closely involved with the Jal Satyagraha in Khandwa district of Madhya Pradesh 2015 and provided support to the AAP leader and activist spearheading the campaign Alok Agarwal during the historic protests, as well as during the legal battle that ensued. After the 2020 elections, she was made the AAP's in-charge for its Goa unit.

=== 2019 Lok Sabha election ===
Atishi was appointed the Lok Sabha in-charge for East Delhi (Lok Sabha constituency) for the 2019 Lok Sabha elections. She contested from the East Delhi (Lok Sabha constituency) as an Aam Aadmi Party candidate for the 2019 Indian general election. She lost to BJP's Gautam Gambhir by a margin of 4.77 lakh votes, coming in third.

=== 2020 Delhi Legislative Assembly election ===
She contested in the 2020 Delhi Legislative Assembly election from Kalkaji (Delhi Assembly constituency) of South Delhi (Lok Sabha constituency). She defeated Dharambir Singh, a Bharatiya Janata Party candidate, by 11,422 votes.

=== Member of the Delhi Legislative Assembly (2020–present) ===
Since 2020, she has been an elected member of the 7th Delhi Assembly representing Kalkaji Assembly constituency.

Committee assignments of Delhi Legislative Assembly

- Chairman (2022–23), Public Accounts Committee
- Member (2022–23), Questions & Reference Committee
- Member (2022–23), Committee on Women and Child Welfare
- Member (2022–23), Committee on Ethics
- Member (2022–23), Committee on Welfare of Minorities
- Member (2022–23), Standing Committee on Education
- Member (2022–23), Standing Committee on Health

=== Delhi Cabinet Minister (2023–2024) ===
She was inducted into the Delhi Government as a Cabinet Minister, along with Saurabh Bhardwaj after the resignation of Deputy Chief Minister Manish Sisodia and Health Minister Satyendra Kumar Jain.

Atishi was also spearheading the flagship Mohalla Sabha Project for the Government of NCT of Delhi. The effort to decentralise governance to empower every citizen was a major promise of the AAP before coming to power.

=== Chief Minister of Delhi (2024–2025) ===
On 17 September 2024, she was named as the Chief Minister of Delhi in a meeting of Aam Admi Party MLAs at the residence of Arvind Kejriwal. With this, she went on to become the youngest ever CM of Delhi at an age of 43. Even though Aam Aadmi Party lost the 2025 Delhi Legislative Assembly election, Atishi again won from her constituency Kalkaji, defeating BJP's contender Ramesh Bidhuri by 3521 votes.

== Electoral performance ==
=== 2025 ===
Delhi Assembly elections, 2025: Kalkaji
Party	Candidate	Votes	%	±%
AAP	Atishi	52,154	48.8	
BJP	Ramesh Bidhuri	48,633	45.5	
INC	Alka Lamba	4,392	4.11	
NOTA	None of the above	556	0.52	
Majority		3521	3.3	
Turnout		106876		
		Swing		

Delhi Assembly elections, 2020: Kalkaji
Party	Candidate	Votes	%	±%
AAP	Atishi Marlena	55,897	52.28	+0.57
BJP	Dharambir	44,504	41.63	+8.47
INC	Shivani Chopra	4,965	4.64	−8.07
NOTA	None of the above	551	0.52	+0.03
BSP	Jay Prakash Sharma	551	0.44	−0.02
Majority		11,393	10.65	−7.90
Turnout		1,06,910	57.51	−7.34
AAP hold		Swing	+0.57	

2019 Indian general elections: East Delhi
Party	Candidate	Votes	%	±%
BJP	Gautam Gambhir	696,356	55.35	+7.52
INC	Arvinder Singh Lovely	3,04,934	24.24	+7.25
AAP	Atishi Marlena	2,19,328	17.44	−14.47
NOTA	None of the Above	4,920	0.39	−0.03
Majority		3,91,222	31.11	+15.19
Turnout		12,58,195	61.70	−3.69
BJP hold		Swing	+7.52	

== Controversies ==
On March 15, 2019, Atishi and three other party leaders were summoned to court in response to a defamation case filed by the Delhi BJP's vice-president, Rajeev Babbar. The case stemmed from their claim that the BJP had removed 30 lakh names from Delhi's voter list. The court found the allegation prima facie defamatory and invoked Section 500 of the Indian Penal Code (IPC) for defamation. The case revolved around allegations of voter list manipulation and its impact on the BJP's reputation.

BJP leader Praveen Shankar Kapoor filed a defamation suite in 2024 against Atishi and Kejriwal over the allegations of poaching.

During her term as the CM, Atishi was set to move into the CM's residence, a bungalow on 6, Flagstaff Road, on 7 October 2024. However, on 9 October, the AAP alleged that the BJP had failed to allot the bungalow to her and that they were trying to "usurp" it, showing documentation that Kejriwal had already vacated the bungalow. The BJP responded by claiming that Kejriwal still had the keys to the bungalow and had failed to transfer them to Atishi.

Political offices
Preceded by Arvind Kejriwal	Chief Minister of Delhi; 2024–2025	Succeeded by Rekha Gupta
State Legislative Assembly
Preceded by Avtar Singh	Member of the Delhi Legislative Assembly from Kalkaji Assembly constituency 2020–present	Incumbent
Aam Aadmi Party political offices
New political party	Member of Political Affairs Committee of AAP ??–present	Incumbent
New political party	Member of National Executive Committee AAP ??–present	Incumbent
Preceded by ?	State Convener of AAP, Goa; 2020–present	Incumbent
