= Ashish Khetan =

Indian lawyer, public policy expert and writer

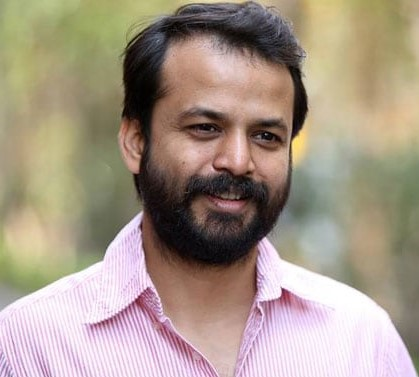
- Khetan at Delhi Secretariat

Vice Chairman, Dialogue and Development Commission of Delhi
- In office 20 February 2015 – 18 April 2018
- Succeeded by: Jasmine Shah

Personal details
- Born: Barabanki, Uttar Pradesh, India
- Spouse: Divorced
- Education: Georgetown Law, University of Cambridge, University of Delhi
- Profession: Lawyer

Ashish Khetan is a distinguished Indian lawyer. From July 2021 to August 2024, he served as an associate professor at OP Jindal Global University, where he taught courses in investment law, commercial arbitration, and national securities laws. He is currently running his own private law practice.

== Public life ==
Before joining the field of law, Khetan worked as a journalist and then had a stint in the field of politics and public policy.

In a career spanning over 15 years he worked with major English publications and TV news networks in India.

In 2014, he joined the Aam Aadmi Party and fought the 2014 Indian General Election from New Delhi but lost to Bharatiya Janata Party's candidate Meenakshi Lekhi.

In 2015, he was appointed as vice chairman of the Dialogue and Development Commission (DDC) of Delhi, a think tank of the Delhi government. He was given the rank of Cabinet Minister for his contributions to the government.

During his three year stint he formulated major policy recommendations and a few key legislations in sectors such as energy, health, education and urban development..

In April 2018, he resigned from the DDC to practice law. In August 2018, he left the Aam Aadmi Party, citing the desire to pursue law as a full-time profession.

He recently resigned from his position as an associate professor at OP Jindal Global University and has since established his own private legal practice.

== Writings ==
He has written on issues like communal violence, internal security, political economy and law. His articles have appeared in The Indian Express , The Telegraph, Scroll , The Wire , Tehelka, The New Indian Express, The Hindu and The Leaflet.
