= Delhi Jal Board =

Government agency in India

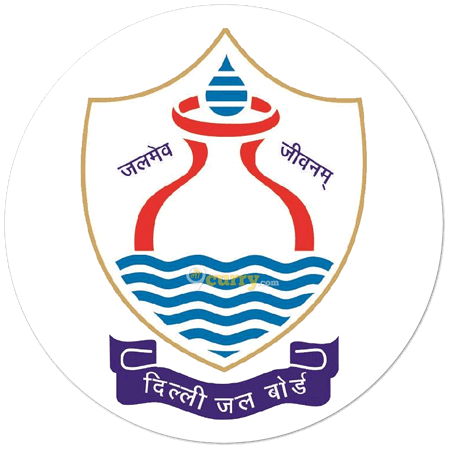
- Formation: April 6, 1998; 28 years ago
- Website: Delhi Jal Borad

The Delhi Jal Board (DJB) in the National Capital Region is the government agency responsible for the supply of potable water to most of the National Capital Territory region of Delhi, India. Delhi Jal Board was constituted on 6 April 1998 through an Act of the Delhi Legislative Assembly incorporating the previous Delhi Water Supply and Sewage Disposal Undertaking. DJB is also responsible for the treatment and disposal of waste water.

== Water supply policies ==
In 2004, the DJB called on residents to use a bucket of water instead of shower in order to save water. In July 2012, the Board decided the privatization of tanker management system in the city to check pilferage of water. In late 2019, vide Resolution No. 871 dated 27.08.2019, the DJB announced a complete waiver of water arrears for people living in colonies categorized as E, F, G and H (House Tax Categorization) and a rebate ranging from 25-75 per cent of the dues for consumers falling in the other four categories (A-D). After a history of non-implementation of Rainwater Harvesting (RWH) Systems in the city , the Board has now mandated the installation of such systems in the city while setting a hard target for implementation. The Board has also made attempts to incentivize RWH methods by proposing financial assistance for the construction of RWH systems providing rebates on the water bill to households which install such systems. The Board has also proposed the imposition of fines on households not complying with the hard deadline of March 2020 for getting RWH systems installed.

== Challenges in meeting needs of workers and residents ==
A 2007 article in Newsweek profiled a ten-year veteran sewer worker of Delhi Jal, in preparation for the 2007 World Toilet Summit in New Delhi. "The four-day event is exploring ways to bring sewage systems to the estimated 2.6 billion people in the world who don't have proper toilets, including 700 million in India alone."

The article carried the headline: "The world's worst job? Indian sewage workers are certainly in the running," adding that the 3,700 miles of existing sewer lines were in poor repair and had inadequate capacity to meet the needs of a growing population.

== Corruption charges ==
Delhi Jal Board was found guilty of corruption in an effort to privatize itself when an investigation was conducted by Arvind Kejriwal and the non-governmental organization (NGO) Parivartan in 2005. After submitting a Right to Information (RTI) request, Parivartan received 9000 pages of correspondence and consultation with the World Bank, where it was revealed that the privatization of Delhi's water supply would provide salaries of $25,000 a month to four administrators of each of the 21 water zones, which amounted to over $25 million per year, increasing the budget by over 60% and water taxes 9 times.

The Delhi Jal Board was first approached by Parivartan in November 2004, following a report by the newspaper The Asian Age, where the scheme was revealed to the public for the first time. The DJB denied the existence of the project, but after an appeal, the RTI request was granted. The documents revealed that the project began in 1998, in complete secrecy within the DJB administration. The DJB approached the World Bank for a loan to improve the water system, which it approved, and the effort began with a $2.5 million consultation loan. The Delhi government could have easily provided the money, and the interest rate of 12% that was to be loaned by the World Bank could have been raised on capital markets for 6%. Following the consultation, 35 multinational companies bid, of which six were to be shortlisted, out of which PricewaterhouseCoopers (PwC) was found to be unethically favored, and granted the contract in 2001. Following the investigation by Parivartan, a campaign was waged by Kejriwal, Aruna Roy, and other activists across Delhi, and the Delhi Jal Board withdrew the loan application to the World Bank.
