= Ramesh Kumar (politician) =

Indian politician

Ramesh Kumar (born 1956) is an Indian politician from Delhi. He was a member of the parliament from South Delhi representing the Indian National Congress party. He won the 2009 Indian general election in Delhi.

His is the son of the late Raghunath Singh and the brother of Sajjan Kumar, who was convicted and sentenced to a term of life imprisonment for alleged involvement in the 1984 anti-Sikh riots. He studied Class 10 at Government Senior Secondary School, Shakurpur, Delhi and passed the examinations in 1971. Later, he discontinued his studies.

== Career ==
Kumar won from South Delhi Lok Sabha constituency representing the Indian National Congress in the 2009 Indian general election in Delhi defeating his nearest rival Ramesh Bidhuri of the Bharatiya Janata Party by a margin of 93,219 votes.
