= Ramesh Bidhuri =

Indian politician (born 1961)

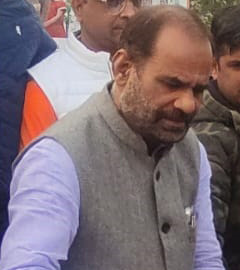

Member of Parliament, Lok Sabha
- In office 16 May 2014 – 4 June 2024
- Preceded by: Ramesh Kumar
- Succeeded by: Ramvir Singh Bidhuri
- Constituency: South Delhi

Member of Delhi Legislative Assembly
- In office 2003–2014
- Preceded by: Ch Shish Pal
- Succeeded by: Sahi Ram
- Constituency: Tughlakabad

Personal details
- Born: 18 July 1961 (age 65) Delhi, India
- Party: Bharatiya Janata Party
- Spouse: Kamla Bidhuri (m. 1987)
- Children: 2 sons, 1 daughter
- Parents: Ramrikh (father); Charto Devi (mother)
- Education: Shaheed Bhagat Singh College, Delhi University (B.Com) Chaudhary Charan Singh University (LLB)
- Profession: Politician, lawyer, businessperson

Ramesh Bidhuri (born 18 July 1961) is an Indian politician, lawyer and a former Member of Parliament affiliated with the Bharatiya Janata Party (BJP). Bidhuri and his family have been active members of the Rashtriya Swayamsevak Sangh from their early childhood. He started his political career as an elected central councillor of Shaheed Bhagat Singh College and to the executive council of Delhi University. He served as a Member of parliament for the South Delhi constituency twice, and as a Member of the Legislative Assembly (MLA) thrice.

== Early life ==
Ramesh Bidhuri was born on 18 July 1961 in Delhi to Ramrikh and Charto Devi.

== Political career ==
Bidhuri completed his graduation with a Bachelor of Commerce degree from Shaheed Bhagat Singh College (M), Delhi University, and completed his degree in law (LLB) from Chaudhary Charan Singh University, Meerut.

Since 1993, Bidhuri has worked actively in politics, occupying posts in several religious and political organizations. In 1996, he worked as the District General Secretary, Mehrauli district, and served as the Pradesh Secretary of Dharm Yatra of Mahasangh.

He also served the party as District President BJP (1997–2003) and as the Vice President BJP Delhi Pradesh (2003–2008). Since 2008, he has occupied the position of General Secretary, BJP Delhi Pradesh. He joined BJP and has thrice been the MLA from Tughlakabad.

In the 2014 Indian general election, Bidhuri was declared as the candidate from South Delhi constituency by the BJP, and later won the election..

In 2019, he defeated Aam Aadmi Party's Raghav Chadha and Indian National Congress's Vijender Singh in elections in South Delhi (Lok Sabha constituency) by gaining more than 54% votes.

In 2025 Delhi Legislative Assembly election, he contested from Kalkaji Assembly constituency and was defeated by Aam Aadmi Party's candidate and Chief Minister Atishi by 3500 votes.

== Controversies ==
During a discussion in Parliament on 21 September 2023, Bidhuri directed derogatory and communal remarks at Bahujan Samaj Party MP Kunwar Danish Ali. The comments, which were later expunged from the parliamentary record, were widely condemned by parliamentarians and political leaders across party lines. The Bharatiya Janata Party issued a show-cause notice to him over the incident. However, the Speaker, Om Birla, did not announce any disciplinary action. Bidhuri later expressed regret for his remarks.

In 2015, five women Opposition MPs submitted a complaint to the then Speaker, Sumitra Mahajan, accusing Bidhuri of "abusive behaviour" and using "abusive and derogatory" language in the House.

In January 2025, Bidhuri made a widely criticised remark about Congress leader and MP Priyanka Gandhi, saying, "I assure you that just as we made the roads in Okhla and Sangam Vihar, we will make all the roads in Kalkaji like Priyanka Gandhi's cheeks." The comment drew sharp reactions from opposition parties and civil society groups, though Bidhuri later defended his statement.

== Posts held ==
=== Political posts ===
From	To	Position
2003	2008	Member, Third Legislative Assembly of Delhi
2008	2013	Member, Fourth Legislative Assembly of Delhi
2013	2014	Member, Fifth Legislative Assembly of Delhi
2014	2019	Member, Sixteenth Lok Sabha
2019	2024	Member, Seventeenth Lok Sabha

=== Legislative posts ===
From	To	Position
1998	1999	OSD to Chairperson, Committee on Subordinate Legislation
2014	2019	Member, Standing Committee on Urban Development
2014	2019	Member, Standing Committee on Welfare of Other Backward Classes
2014	2019	Member, Consultative Committee, Ministry of Labour and Employment
2014	2019	Member, National Social Security Board
2017	2019	Member, Committee on Estimates
2019	2024	Member, Committee on Welfare of Other Backward Classes
2019	2024	Chairperson, Standing Committee on Petroleum and Natural Gas
2019	2024	Member, General Purposes Committee, Lok Sabha
2019	2024	Member, Consultative Committee, Ministry of Housing and Urban Affairs
