= Anand Group =

Automotive industry company

ANAND Group
- Industry: Automotive
- Founded: 1961
- Founder: Deep C Anand
- Headquarters: 1, Sri Aurobindo Marg, Hauz Khas, New Delhi, India
- Key people: Anjali Singh (Executive Chairperson); Mahendra K Goyal (CEO)
- Website: www.anandgroupindia.com

ANAND Group is an Automotive Industry company, with headquarters in Delhi, India. It manufactures as well as supplies automotive systems and components.

== Overview ==
ANAND Group was founded by Deep C Anand, and named after the founder. The company manufactures automotive components. The company is responsible for introducing different kinds of automotive equipments into the Indian market. Mrs. Anjali Anand Singh is the Chairperson OF ANAND Group India and Gabriel India Limited (The Flagship Company).

== The evolution ==
The history of ANAND dates back to 1961, when Mr Deep C Anand, Founder of ANAND and Chairman of the Deep C Anand Foundation, set up his first business venture – Gabriel India. The flagship company of the Group, Gabriel was set up in collaboration with Maremont Corporation (now Gabriel Ride Control Products of ArvinMeritor Inc.), USA for manufacture of shock absorbers at Mulund in Mumbai.

== History ==
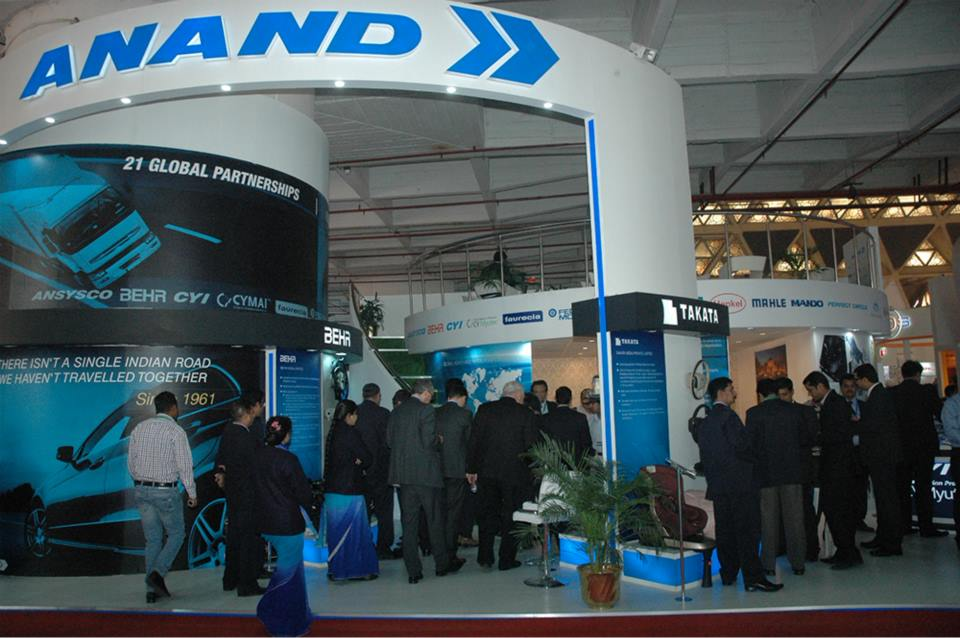
Auto Expo 2014

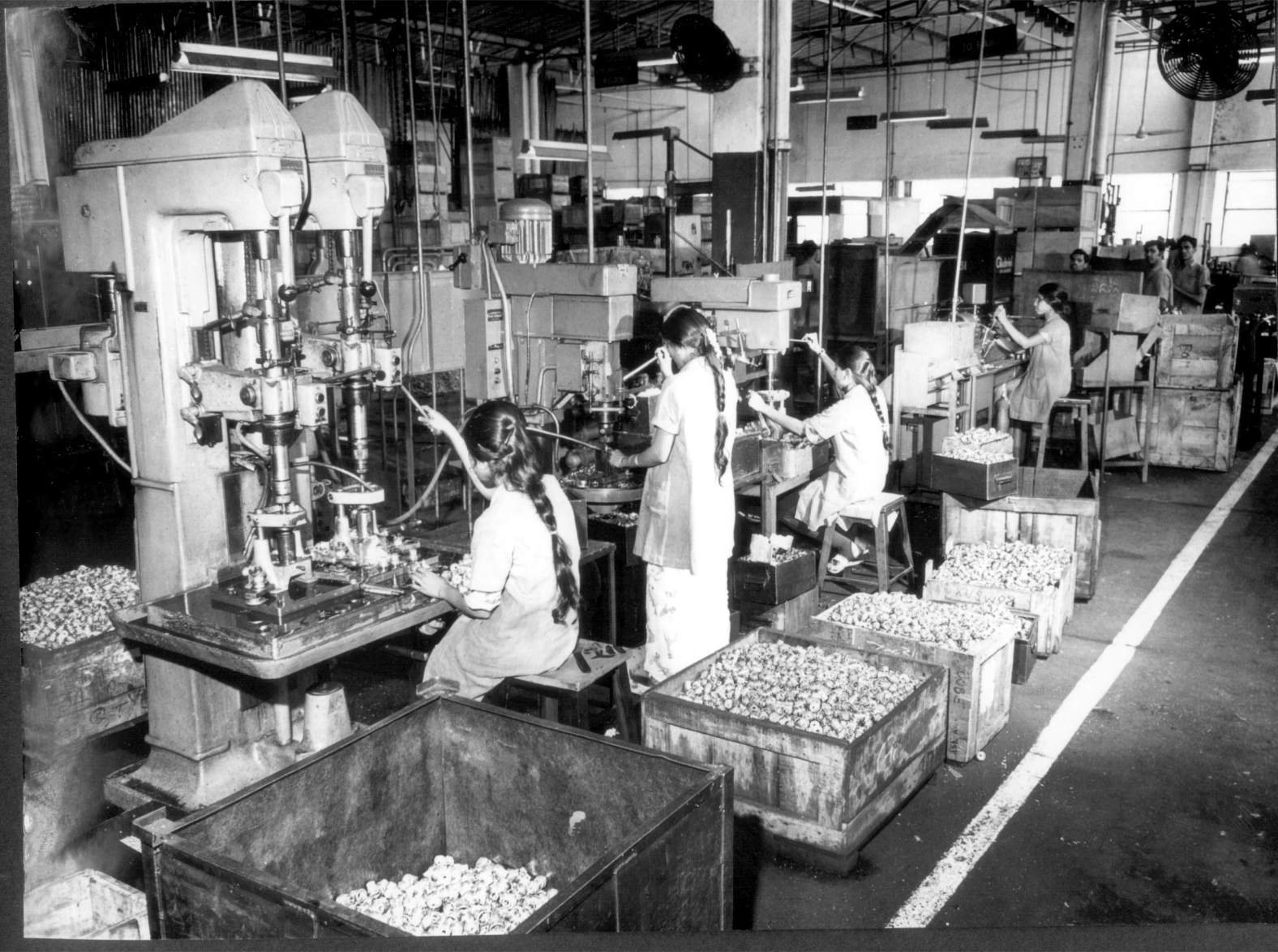
Gabriel

In 2005, Mahle and the ANAND Group restructured their partnership, resulting in the formation of an automotive filter conglomerate.

In 2009, the Japanese company Takata Corporation began a collaboration with ANAND Group to manufacture safety Safety systems.

By 2012 ANAND Automotive invested in non-automotive businesses such as high-end hospitality.

In 2013, ANAND Automotive decided to invest ₹1,200 crores over the next five years on new product development.

By January 2014, the ANAND Group operated 47 manufacturing facilities producing various automotive components and reported total sales of ₹5,800 crore.

In March 2015 Anand India and Federal-Mogul Powertrain entered into an agreement to convert the sealing and piston ring businesses of Anand into joint venture (JV) operations.

In 2017 the company signed technical assistance agreement with Seiken Chemical Industry.

This was followed by the establishment of a joint venture between ANAND Group and Joyson Safety Systems in 2019.

In 2020, the company announced new collaborations with FAR and Mazaro.

In 2021, ANAND Group and Mando Corporation began preparations to supply motors and controllers for the emerging two- and three-wheeler electric vehicle market.t.
