= IHE =

IHE may refer to:

- Ideal Human Environment, an Australian cult
- Insensitive High Explosive, a type of insensitive munition
- Institute of Highway Engineers, British professional association
- Institute of Home Economics, a girls' college of Delhi University
- Integrating the Healthcare Enterprise, a non-profit organisation in the US
- UNESCO-IHE, Institute for Water Education
