= Chor Minar =

13th-century minaret in Delhi, India

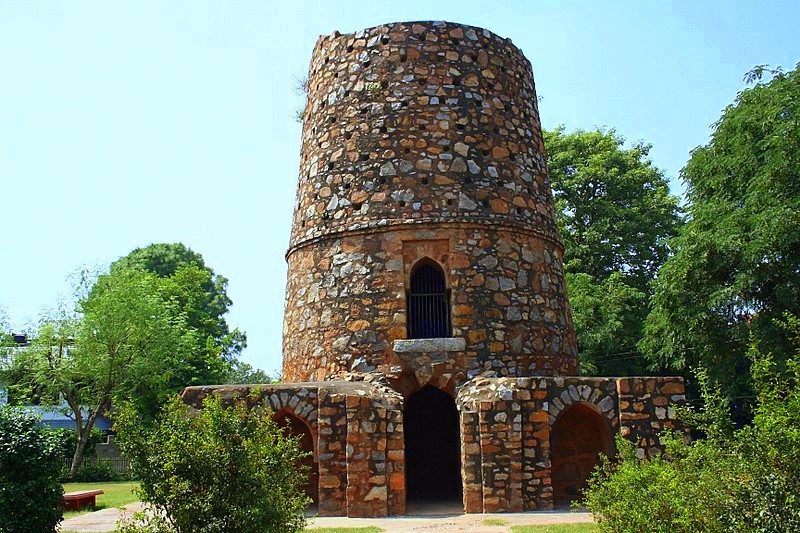
- Chor Minar
- Interactive map of the Chor Minar area

General information
- Location: New Delhi, India
- Construction started: Khalji dynasty

Chor Minar or 'Tower of Thieves' is a 13th-century minaret with 225 holes, situated just off Aurobindo Marg in the Hauz Khas area, in New Delhi. The Chor Minar is nearly 700 to 800 years old. it's also situated in narnaul Haryana near dhosi hills 120 km away from Delhi

== History ==
It was built under the rule of Alauddin Khalji, of the Khalji dynasty (1290–1320) in the thirteenth century. Historians suggests that the Khalji king slaughtered a settlement of Mongol people, nearby, to stop them from joining with their brethren in another Mongol settlement in Delhi, the present day locality of 'Mongolpuri'.

During the raid of Ali Beg, Tartaq and Targhi (1305), 8,000 Mongol prisoners were executed and their heads displayed is the towers around Siri

== Purpose ==
According to local legends, it was a 'tower of beheading', where the severed heads of thieves were displayed on spear through its 225 holes, to act as a deterrent to thieves. In case the heads exceeded the number of holes, the less important heads were piled in a pyramid outside the tower.
