= Hauz Khas Complex =

Site in Delhi, India

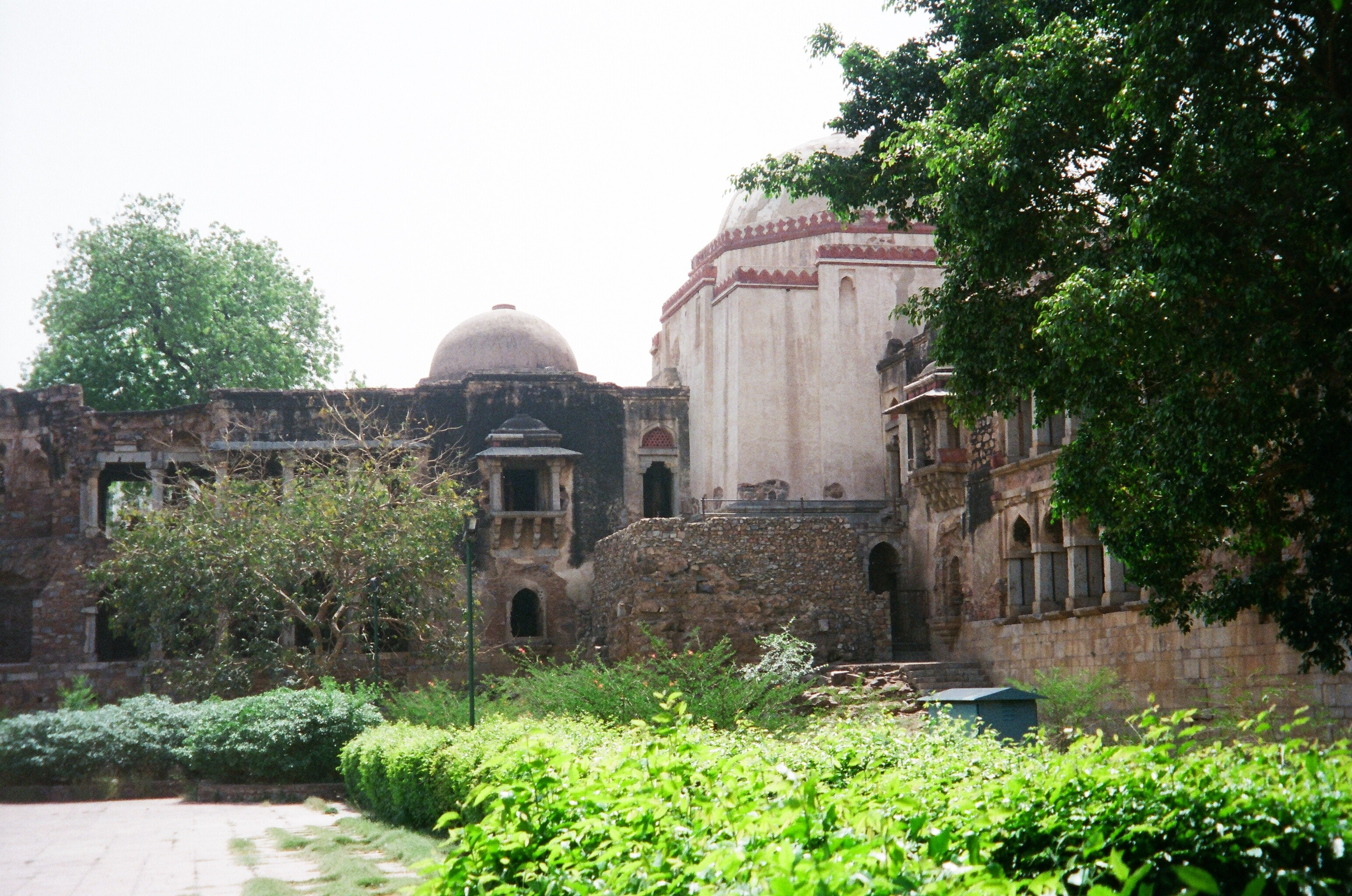
Eastern limb of the madrasa from the tomb

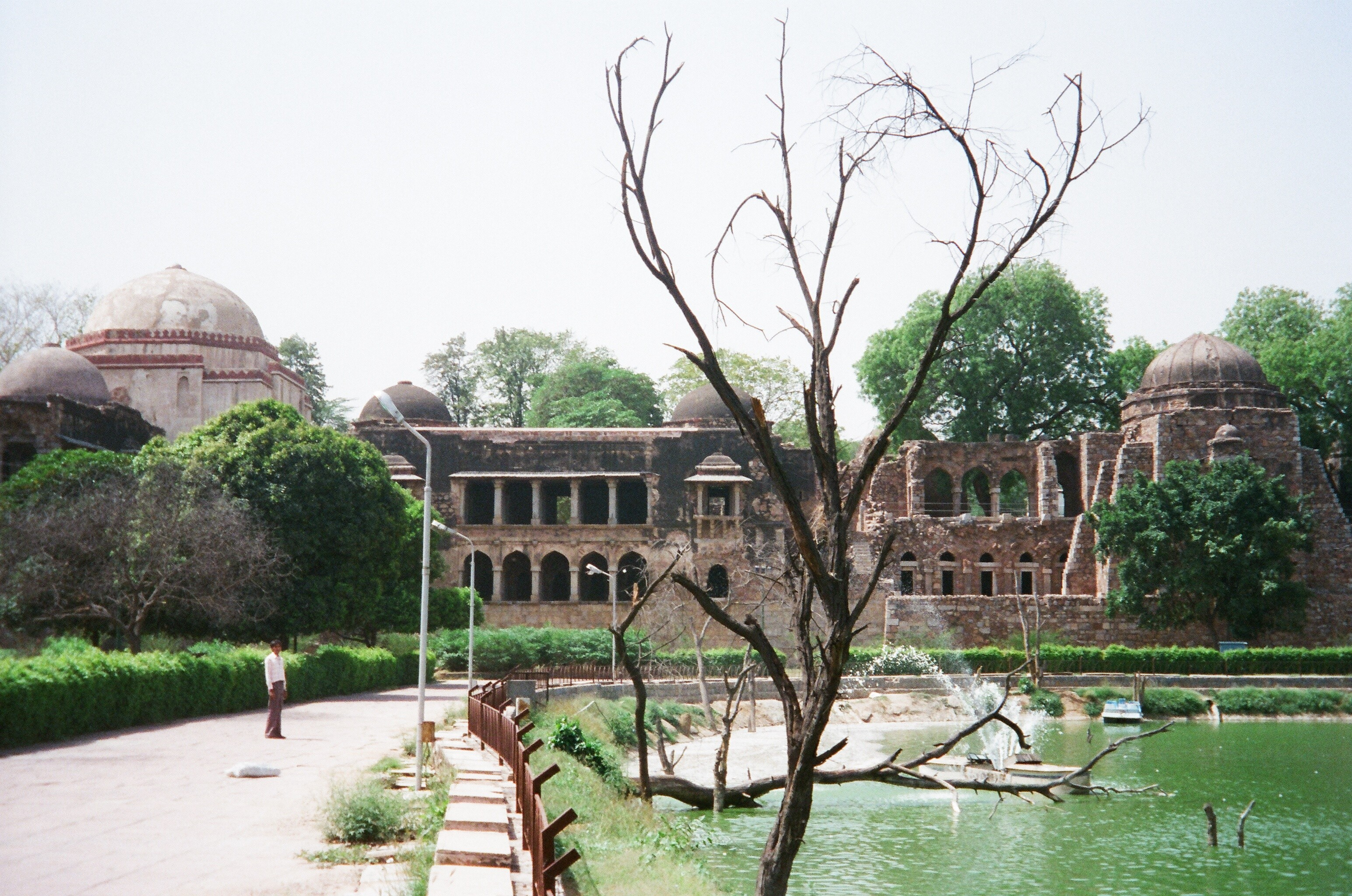
Northern limb of the madrasa starting with the tomb of Feruz Shah and ending in a mosque, with reservoir in the foreground

Hauz Khas Complex in Hauz Khas, South Delhi, India, houses a water tank, an Islamic seminary, a mosque, a tomb, and pavilions built around an urbanized village with a medieval history traced to the 13th century of Delhi Sultanate reign. It was part of Siri, the second medieval city of India of the Delhi Sultanate of Alauddin Khalji Dynasty (1296–1316). The large water tank or reservoir was first built by Allauddin Khilji (the plaque displayed at the site records this fact) to supply water to the inhabitants of Siri. The tank was de–silted during the reign of Firuz Shah Tughlaq (1351–88). Several buildings (Mosque and madrasa) and tombs were built overlooking the water tank or lake. Firuz Shah's tomb pivots the L–shaped building complex which overlooks the tank.

In the 1980s, Hauz Khas Village, studded with domed tombs of Muslim royalty from the 14th to 16th centuries, was developed as an upper class residential commercial area in the metropolis of South Delhi. It is now a relatively expensive tourist commercial area with numerous art galleries, upscale boutiques and fancy restaurants.

== Etymology ==
The etymology of the name Hauz Khas in Persian is derived from the words 'Hauz', meaning "water tank" (or lake) and 'Khas', meaning "royal": thus, it is the "Royal tank".

== History ==
The water tank was built during Alauddin Khilji's reign (1296–1316) in the second city of Delhi to meet the water supply needs of the newly built fort at Siri, and was originally known as Hauz-i-Alai after Khilji. Firuz Shah Tughlaq (1351–88) of the Tughlaq dynasty re-excavated the silted tank and cleared the clogged inlet channels. The tank was originally of about 50 ha (123.6 acres) area with dimensions of 600 m (1,968.5 ft) width and 700 m (2,296.6 ft) length with 4 m (13.1 ft) depth of water. When built, its storage capacity at the end of each monsoon season was reported to be 0.8 M. Now the tank size has substantially reduced due to encroachment and siltation but is well maintained in its present state (pictured).

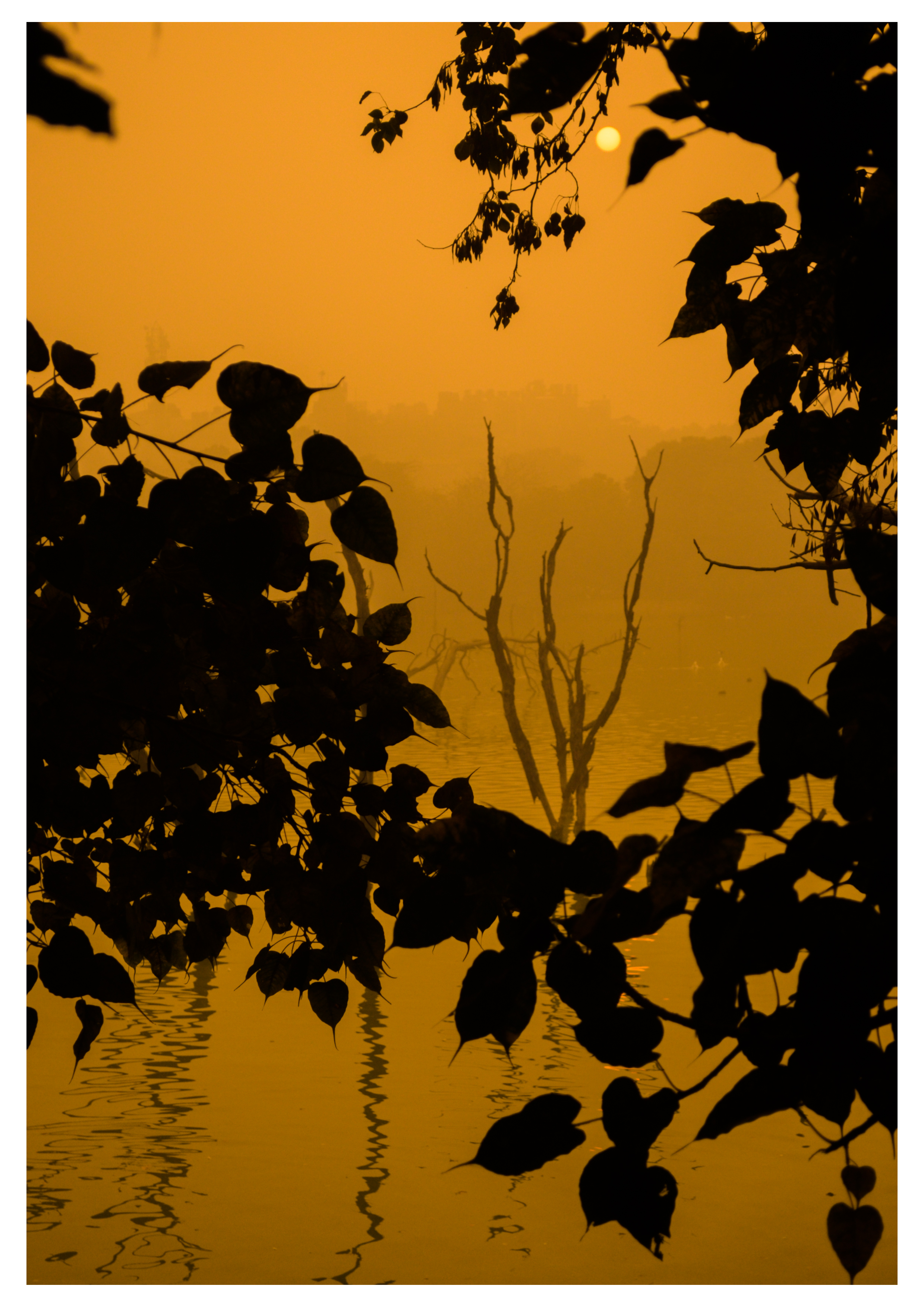
HauzKhas Lake in foggy winter sunrise

Feruz Shah, who ruled from his new city called Firozabad (now known as Feroz Shah Kotla, the fifth city of Delhi, was an enlightened ruler. He was known for "his keen sense of historical precedent, statements of dynastic legitimacy and the power of monumental architecture". He is credited with construction of new monuments (several mosques and palaces) in innovative architectural styles, irrigation works and renovating/restoring old monuments such as the Qutub Minar, Sultan Ghari and Suraj Kund, and also erecting two inscribed Ashokan Pillars, which he had transported from Ambala and Meerut in Delhi. At Hauz Khas, he raised several monuments on the southern and eastern banks of the reservoir.

The Hauz Khas or the Royal Tank as revived now

Recent lake restoration efforts

In efforts made in the past by the Delhi Development Authority to develop Hauz Khas village, the inlets to the reservoir were blocked and consequently the lake had gone dry for several years. To rectify the situation, a plan was implemented in 2004 to store storm water generated at the southern ridge of Delhi behind an embankment and then divert it into the lake. An outside source has also been tapped by feeding the water from the treatment plant at Sanjay Van into the lake. Unfortunately, in spite of the plans, a mixture of partially treated and raw sewage ended up flowing into the lake, creating a water body that was more similar to an oxidation pond than a lake. The water turned green from the amount of algae that grew and a foul smell permeated around the park and surrounding areas. Various attempts were made to remedy the problems and there were temporary minor improvements from time to time, but none were fully successful and the lake languished in this condition until 2018. The lake finally saw a permanent change in water quality in 2019 when a citizen initiative was started by EVOLVE Engineering and the Hauz Khas Urban Wetlands were created with public donations and with the help of a corporate sponsor. Two constructed wetlands were built, one to filter the incoming water flow and one to filter the existing water body, as well as numerous floating wetland islands that were adopted by members of the public. Together they form the largest constructed wetland system in Delhi and are unique in that they were entirely funded by and built by individual citizens and a corporation. Although still in progress, the project has already started operation, and for the first time since its inception, clean water now flows into the lake. EVOLVE Engineering is made up of two professional engineers who are also helping the local authorities improve their management of the lake and ensure that the lake water quality continues to improve.

== Structures ==
The notable structures built by Firuz Shah on the eastern and northern side of the reservoir consisted of the Madrasa (Islamic School of Learning – a theological college), the small Mosque, the Main tomb for himself and six domed pavilions in its precincts, which were all built between 1352 and 1354 A.D.

Madrasa

Established in 1352, the Madrasa was one of the leading institutions of Islamic learning in the Delhi Sultanate. It was also considered the largest and best equipped Islamic seminary anywhere in the world. There were three main Madrasa's in Delhi during Firuz Shah's time. One of them was the Firuz Shahi madrasa at Hauz Khas. After the sacking of Baghdad, Delhi became the most important place in the world for Islamic education. The village surrounding the Madarsa was also called Tarababad (city of joy) in view of its affluent and culturally rich status, which provided the needed supporting sustenance supply system to the Madrasa.

The madrasa structure has an innovative design. It was built in L-Shape as one contiguous structure on the south and east edges of the reservoir complex. One arm of the L-shape structure runs in the North–South direction measuring 76 m (249.3 ft) and the other arm runs in the East–West direction measuring 138 m (452.8 ft). The two arms are pivoted at the large Tomb of Firuz Shah (pictured). At the northern end there is a small mosque. Between the mosque and the tomb two storied pavilions exist now on the northern side and similar pavilions on the eastern side, overlooking the lake, which were used as madrasa. The two arms are interconnected through small domed gateways passing through the tomb at the center. The North–South arm with balconies overlooking the reservoir is a two storied building with three towers of varying sizes. Ornamental brackets cover the upper storied balconies while the lower stories have corbelled support. Roof overhangs or eaves (chajjas) are seen now only in the upper stories though it is said that they existed on both stories when it was built.

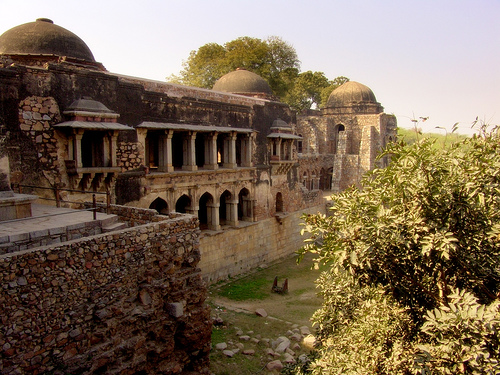
North-South arm of the Madrasa and Mosque overlooking the reservoir

From each floor of the Madrasa, staircases are provided to go down to the lake. Many cenotaphs, in the form of octagonal and square chhatris are also seen, which are reported to be possibly tombs of teachers of the Madrasa.

It is recorded that the first Director of the Madarasa was

one Jalal al-Din Rumi who knew fourteen sciences, could recite the Quran according to the seven known methods of recitation and had complete mastery over the five standard collections of the Traditions of the Prophet

The madrasa was well tended with liberal donations from the Royalty. Timur, the Mongol ruler, who invaded Delhi, defeated Mohammed Shah Tughlaq in 1398 and plundered Delhi, had camped at this venue. Expressed in his own words, his impressions of the tank and buildings around Hauz Khas were vividly described as:

When I reached [the city’s] gates, I carefully reconnoitered its towers and walls, and then returned to the side of the Hauz Khas. This is a reservoir, which was constructed by Sultan Feruz Shah, and is faced all round with stone and stucco. Each side of the reservoir is more than a bows–shot long, and there are buildings placed around it. This tank is filled by rains in the rainy season, and it supports the people of the city with water throughout the year. The tomb of Sultan Firuz Shah stands on its bank

While his description of the place is correct but his ascribing construction of the tank to Firuz Shah was a misconception.

Pavilions

Three pavilions inside the Tomb precincts with a small Chhatri in the foreground

Pavilions adjoining the courtyard

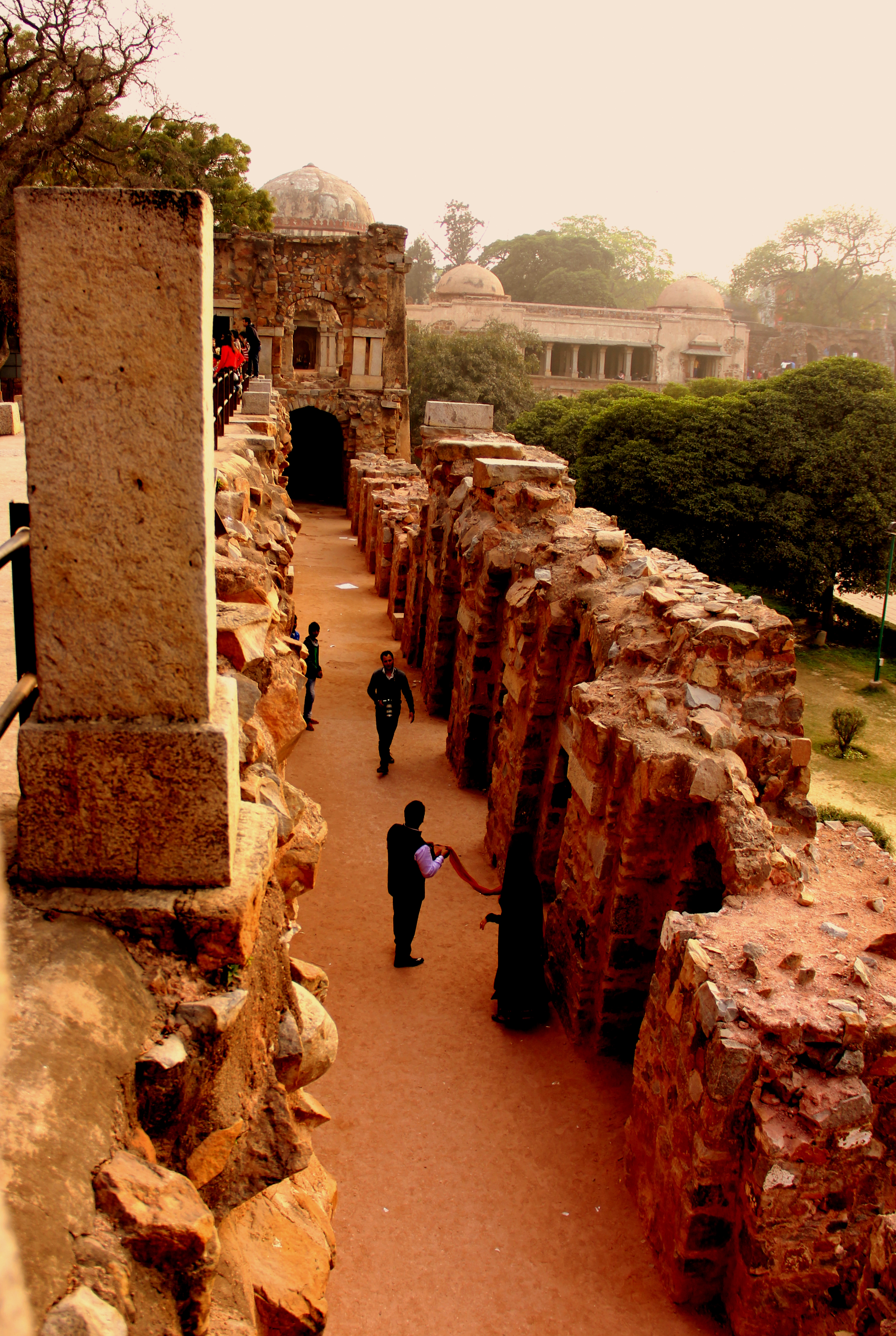
Hauz Khas Complex

The madrasa is flanked by the reservoir in the northern front and by a garden on its southern side at the second floor level. The entry to the garden is from the eastern gate which paases through the Hauz Khas village. The garden houses six impressive pavilions. The pavilions with domes are in different shapes and sizes (rectangular, octagonal and hexagonal) and on the basis of inscriptions are inferred to be graves. A cluster of three hemispherical domes, a large one of 5.5 m (18.0 ft) diameter and two smaller ones of 4.5 m (14.8 ft) diameter, portray exquisite architectural features of foliated motifs on the drums with kalasa motifs on top of the domes. Each pavilion is raised on a plinth of about 0.8 m (2.6 ft) and is supported by square shaped wide columns with entablature which have decorative capitals that support beams with projecting canopies. Ruins of a courtyard with a rectangular plan, are seen to the west of the three pavilions which are built of double columns. The pavilions and the courtyard are conjectured to have been used as part of the madrasa in the past. Another striking structure in the garden, opposite to the Feruz Shah's tomb on the southern side, is a small eight pillared Chatri seen in the garden which has large cantilevered beams that supported flat eaves all round the small dome.

Mosque

Mosque at the Northern Tower of the Madrasa

The northern end of the madrasa is secured to a small mosque. The qibla of the Mosque projects towards the reservoir by about 9.5 m (31.2 ft). A domed gateway from the south east provides entry into three rooms of size 5.3 m (17.4 ft) x 2.4 m (7.9 ft) whose utility is not traced. A C-shaped layout of a double row of pillars on a raised podium forms the prayer hall, which is open to the sky. The qibla wall seen clearly from the reservoir side has five mihrabs. The avant–garde setting of the central mihrab with a domed chhatri (cupola) with open sides is seen in the form of a pavilion projecting into the reservoir. The other mihrabs are set, on either side of the main mihrab, in the walls with grilled windows.

== Firuz Shah's Tomb ==
Tomb of Feroz Shah
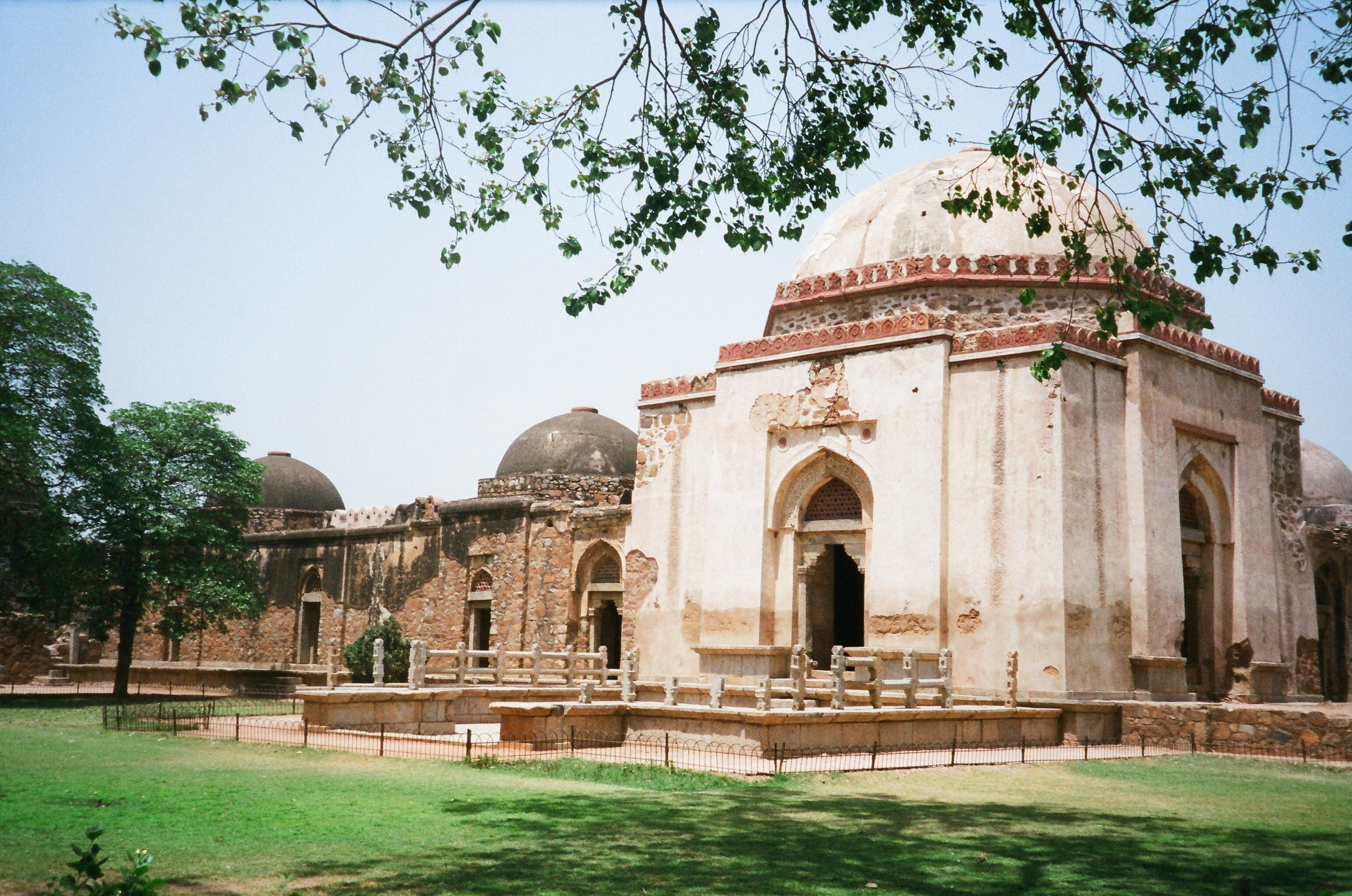
- Tomb of Feroz Shah Tughlaq

Religion
- Affiliation: Islam
- District: South Delhi
- Province: Delhi
- Ecclesiastical or organisational status: Mosque, Madrasa & Tomb
- Leadership: Delhi Sultanate

Location
- Location: New Delhi, India
- Interactive map of Tomb of Feroz Shah
- Territory: Delhi
- Coordinates: 28°33′18″N 77°11′31″E

Architecture
- Architect: Malik Ghazi Shahna
- Type: Indo-Islamic architecture
- Style: Tughluqid period
- Completed: 1352 to 1354 A.D.

Specifications
- Length: 14.8 m (48.6 ft)
- Height (max): 14.8 m (48.6 ft)
- Dome: Seven
- Dome dia. (outer): 8.8 m (28.9 ft) (Main dome)
- Materials: Red Sandstone & Marble

Firuz Shah, who established the tomb, ascended the throne in 1351 (inherited from his cousin Muhammad) when he was middle aged, as the third ruler of the Tughlaq dynasty and ruled till 1388. He was considered a well–liked ruler. His wife was a Hindu lady and his trusted Prime Minister, Khan-i-Jahan Junana Shah was a Hindu convert. Firuz Shah assisted by his Prime Minister was responsible for building several unique monuments (mosques, tombs, pavilions), hunting lodges and irrigation projects (reservoirs) in his domains, apart from establishing and constructing a new Citadel (palace) in his new city of Firuzabad. Feruz died at the age of ninety due to infirmities caused by three years of illness between 1385 and 1388. On his death, his grandson Ghiya Suddin was proclaimed as his successor to the throne. During his enlightened rule Feroz abolished many vexatious taxes, brought in changes in the laws on capital punishment, introduced regulations in administration and discouraged lavish living styles. But the most important credit that is bestowed on him is for the large number of public works executed during his reign namely, 50 dams for irrigation across rivers, 40 mosques, 30 colleges, 100 caravanserais, 100 hospitals, 100 public baths, 150 bridges, apart from many other monuments of aesthetic beauty and entertainment.

Among the notable buildings of historical importance that he built within Hauz Khas precincts is the domed tomb for himself. The tomb which is very austere in appearance, is located at the intersection of the two arms of the L–shaped building which constitutes the madrasa. Entry to the tomb is through a passage in the south leading to the doorway. The passage wall is raised on a plinth which depicts the shape of a fourteen-faced polyhedron built in stones. Three horizontal units laid over eight vertical posts that are chamfered constitute the plinth. Squinches and muqarnas are seen in the solid interior walls of the tomb and these provide the basic support to the octagonal spherical dome of the tomb. The dome with a square plan – 14.8 m (48.6 ft) in length and height – has a diameter of 8.8 m (28.9 ft). The maximum height of the tomb is on its face overlooking the reservoir. The domed gateway on the north has an opening which has height equal to two–thirds the height of the tomb. The width of the gate is equal to one-third of tombs' width. The entrance hall has fifteen bays and terminates in another doorway which is identical to the gateway at the entrance. This second doorway leads to the tomb chamber and cenotaph, which are accessed from the gateway through the L–shaped corridor. Similar arrangement is replicated on the western doorway of the tomb leading to the open pavilion on the west. The ceiling in the dome depicts a circular gold medallion with Quranic inscriptions in Naksh characters. Foliated crenellations are seen on the outer faces of the base of the tomb. Interesting features seen on the northern and southern sides of the tomb, considered typical of the Tuglaq period layout, are the ceremonial steps provided at the ground level that connect to the larger steps leading into the reservoir.

The tomb, a square chamber, is made of local quartzite rubble with a surface plaster finish that sparkled in white colour when completed. The door, pillars and lintels were made of grey quartzites while red sandstone was used for carvings of the battlements. The door way depicts a blend of Indian and Islamic architecture. Another new feature not seen at any other monument in Delhi, built at the entrance to the tomb from the south, is the stone railings (see picture). There are four graves inside the tomb, one is of Feruz Shah and two others are of

== Hauz Khas village ==
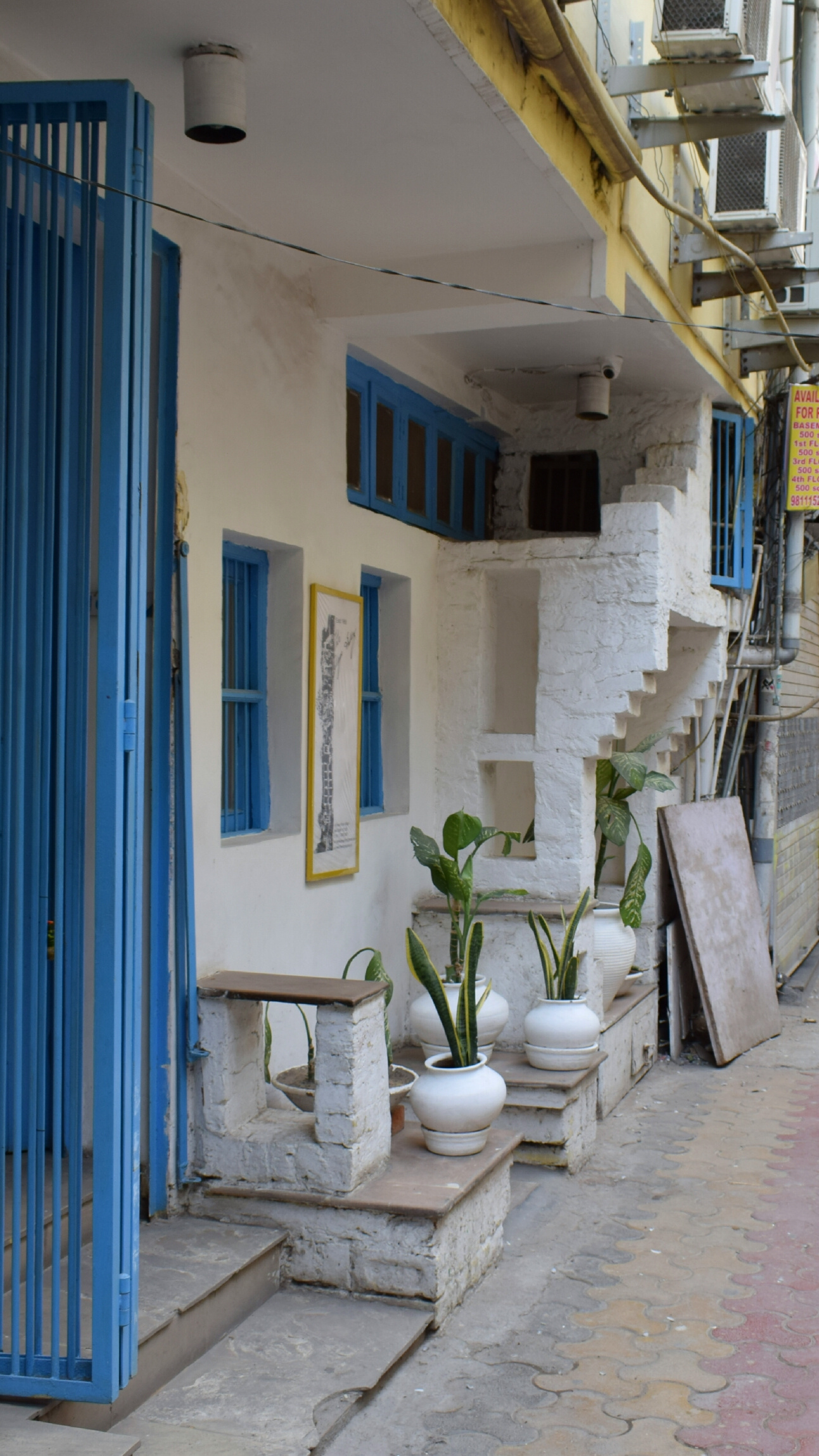
An art gallery in the Hauz Khas village.

The Hauz Khas village, which was known in the medieval period for the amazing buildings built around the reservoir, drew a large congregation of Islamic scholars and students to the Madrasa for Islamic education. A very well researched essay titled "A Medieval Center of Learning in India: The Hauz Khas Madrasa in Delhi" authored by Anthony Welch of the University of Victoria, Victoria, British Columbia, refers to this site as "far and away the finest spot in Delhi not in the ingenuity of its construction and the academic purpose to which it was put but also in the real magic of the place". The present status of the village also retains not only the old charm of the place but has enhanced its aesthetic appeal through the well manicured green parks planted with ornamental trees all around with walk ways, and the sophisticated "gentrified" market and residential complexes which have sprung up around the old village. The tank itself has been reduced in size and well landscaped with water fountains. Welch, elaborating on the present status of the place, has said: "A centre of Musical culture in the 14th century, the village at the Hauz Khas had regained this erstwhile role in an unexpected guise." The village structure that gloriously existed in the medieval period was modernised in the mid 1980s presenting an upscale ambience attracting tourists from all parts of the world. The village complex is surrounded by Safdarjung Enclave, Green Park, South Extension, Greater Kailash. There are some of the India's most prestigious institutes situated in the neighbourhood including Indian Institute of Technology, Delhi, Indian Institute of Foreign Trade, National Institute of Fashion Technology, Jawaharlal Nehru University, Indian Statistical Institute and All India Institute of Medical Sciences.

== Controversies ==
Recently Hauz Khas Village came under environmental lens for massive illegal constructions that have come up in recent past and is posing threat to the monument and forest area of the region . Through a case filed by environmental and social activist Pankaj Sharma in National Green Tribunal of India, it was found that more than 50 restaurants in the locality were spilling waste in the forest lands and posing threat to flora and fauna of the region. The restaurants were forced to close down for 4 days and conditionally allowed to open on promise of following the environmental protection norms.

== Visitor information ==
Hauz Khas is close to Green Park and Safdarjung Development Area and is well connected by road and Metro rail to all city centers.

The complex is open for visitors all days of the week from 10 AM to 6 PM. In 2019, the monument was declared to be a ticketed site and a small ticketing counter was established for visitors.

The Deer Park, located at the entrance to the tank, is a landscaped green space that is home to spotted Deers, peacocks, rabbits, guinea pigs and various species of birds.

A light and sound show narrating the history of the complex is organized by the Tourism Department in the evenings.

The Ministry of Tourism of Government of India is in the process of setting up India's first night bazaar at Hauz Khas, to be called the "Eco Night Bazaar". The objective is to provide organically grown foodgrains, seeds of rare plants, handmade paper products and a safe place to watch cultural festivals. Delhi Tourism and Transportation Development Corporation (DTDC) has also proposed setting up an open-air theatre to present cultural fests, folk dances and plays. Eco–friendly shopping kiosk made in bamboo with a bamboo bridge to cross the lake are also planned.

== Gallery ==
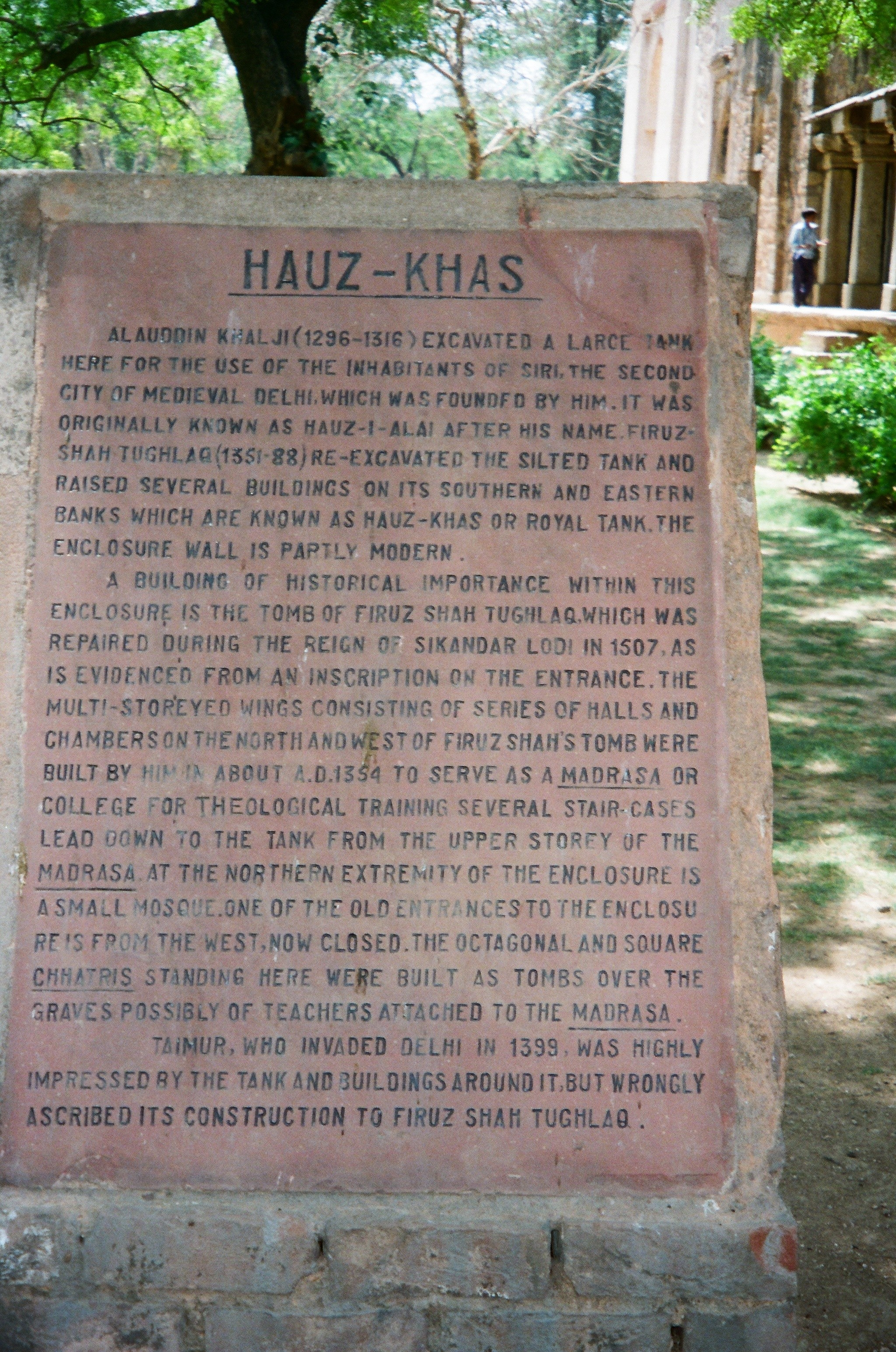
A plaque displayed at the entrance to the precincts of the tomb

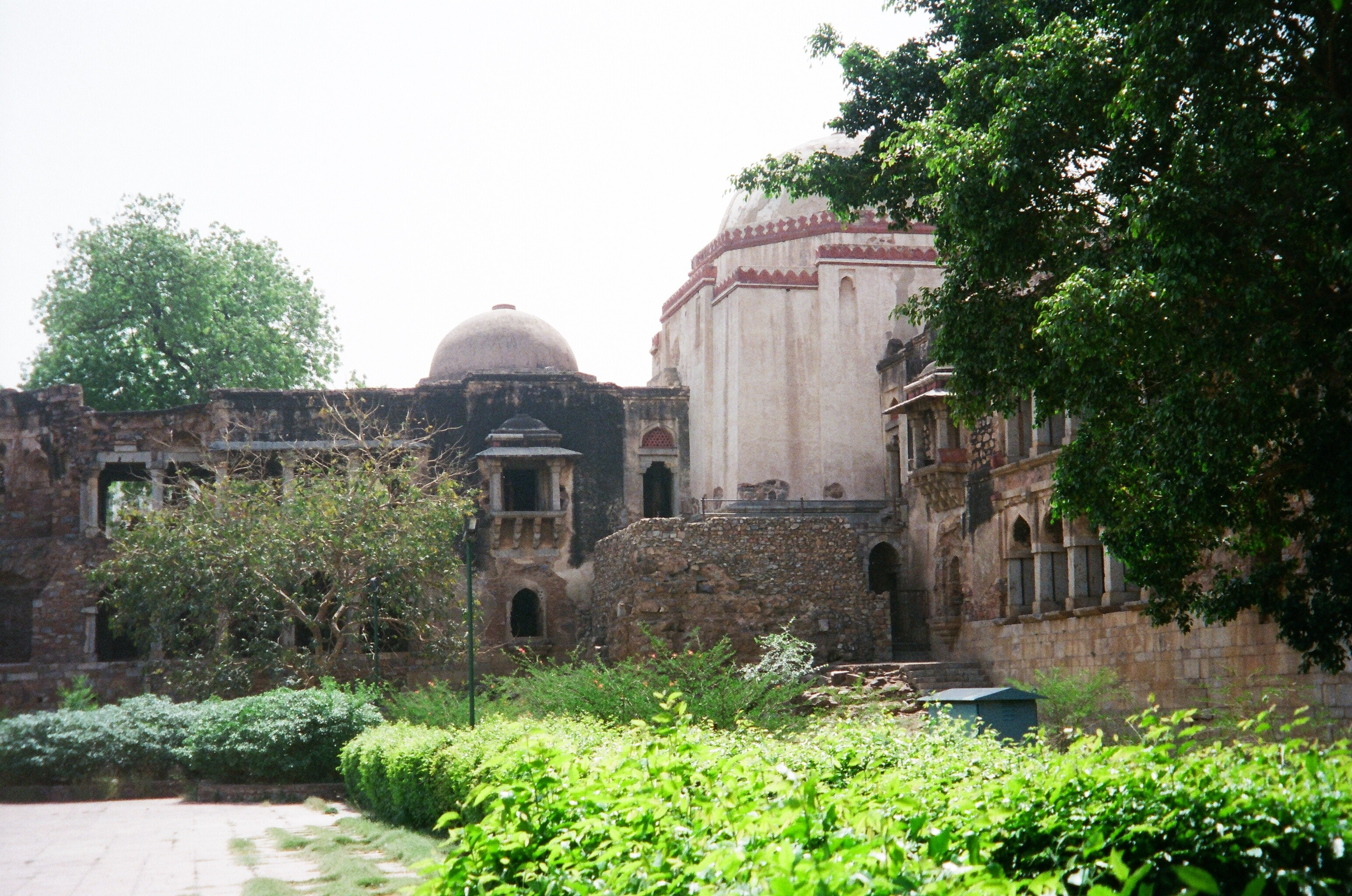
The Eastern Limb starting with Feruz Shah's tomb

The Mosque at the northern end of the Madrasa with qiblas

Another view of the East-west wing of the Madrasa

The East-West arm of the Madrasa overlooking the refurbished lake

View of Modern residential complex behind the pavilions in the garden

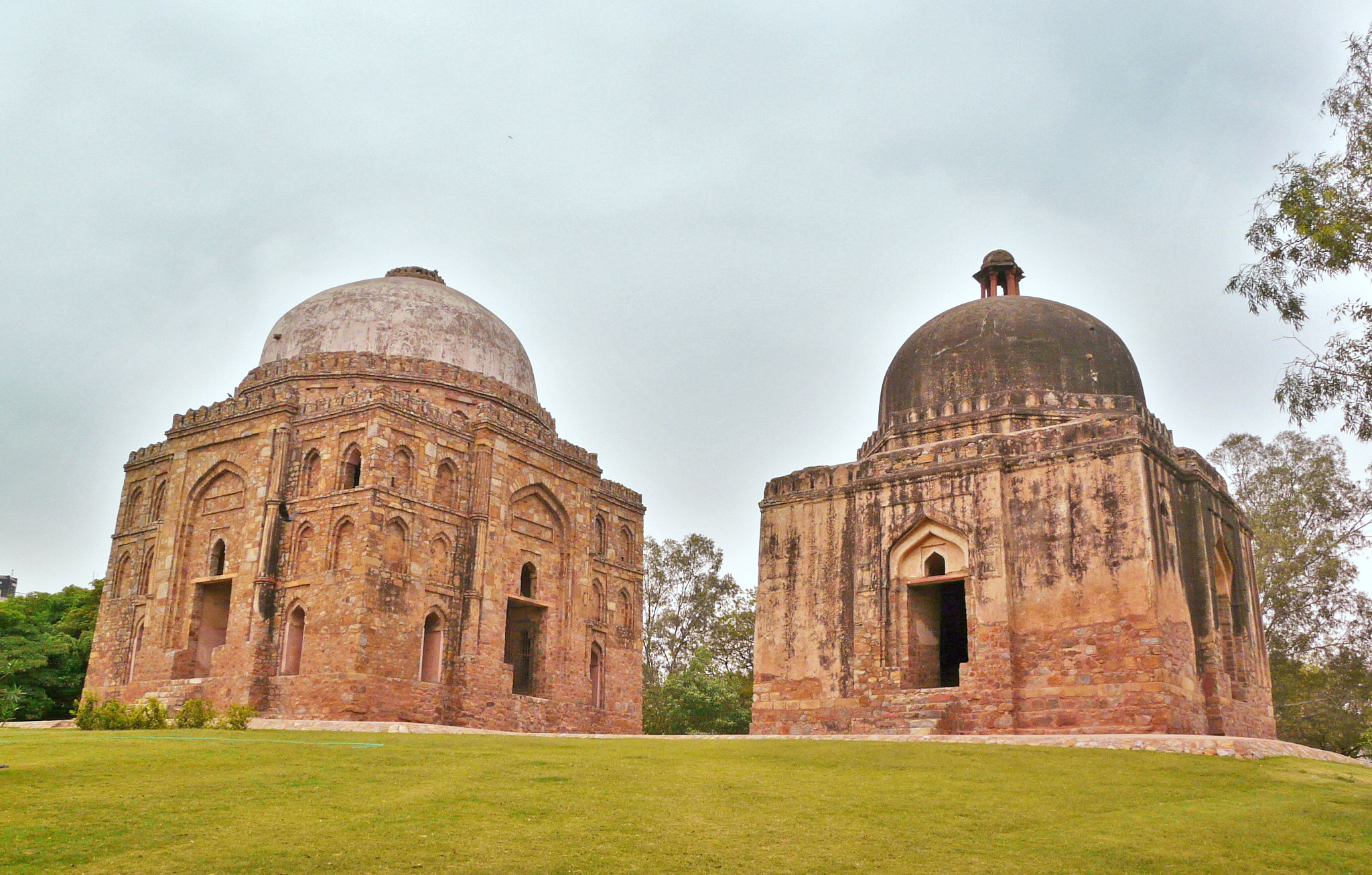
Dadi-Poti ka Gumbad (mausoleums), close to the Hauz Khas Complex.

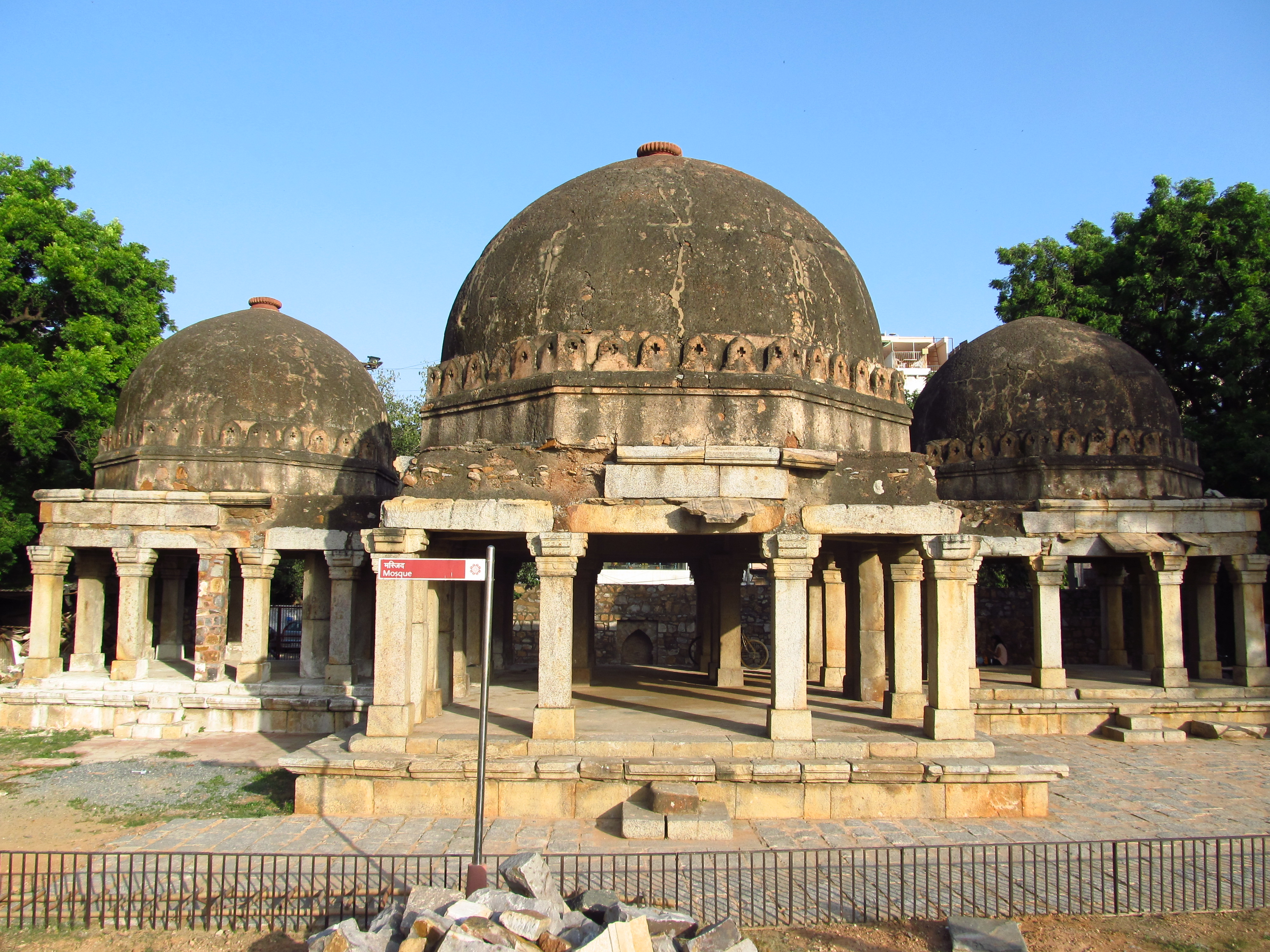
Three Pavilions (Front View) Adjoining Complex

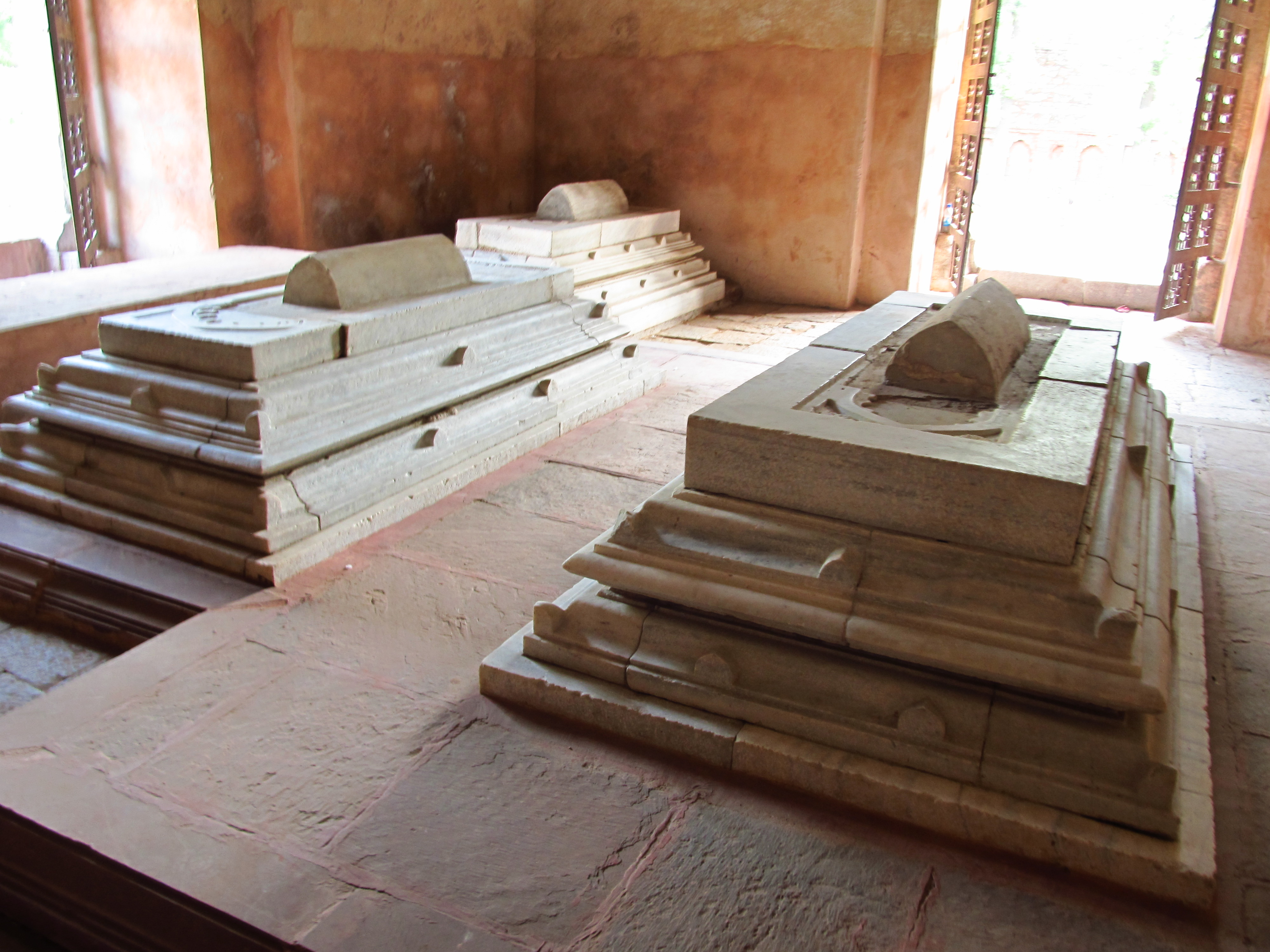
3 tombs inside the Feroze Shah Tomb Monument

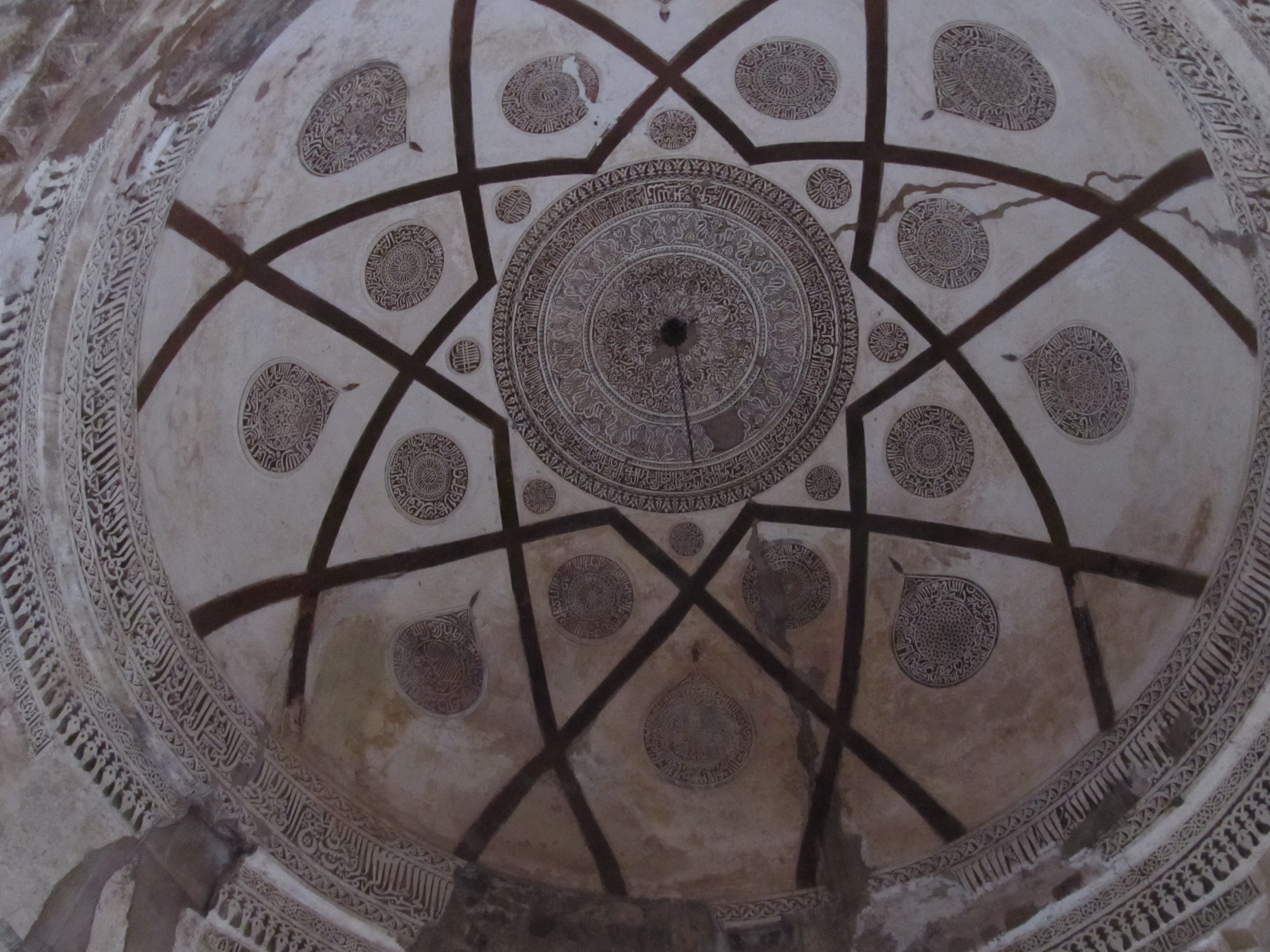
Inside view of the Dome of Feroze Shah's Tomb
