= Hauz Khas =

- District Subdivision
- Location in Delhi, India
- Coordinates: 28.5471°N 77.2040°E
- Country: India
- State: Delhi
- District: South Delhi
- Established: 1300s to 1400s
- Founder: Allauddin Khilji

Languages
  - Official: Hindi, English, Punjabi, Urdu
- Time zone: UTC+5:30 (IST)
- Telephone code: 011

Hauz Khas is a neighbourhood in South Delhi, its heart being the historic Hauz Khas Complex. Well known in mediaeval times, the Hauz Khas village has buildings built around the reservoir. There are remnants of Islamic architecture roughly colored by splotches of urban culture. It is centrally located and offers both rural Hauz Khas Village and urban Hauz Khas Enclave, Market environments. Hauz Khas is surrounded by Green Park, SDA (Sri Aurobindo Marg) to the west, Gulmohar Park (Balbir Saxena Marg) towards the north, Sarvapriya Vihar (Outer Ring Road) towards the south and Asiad Village (August Kranti Marg) and Siri Fort to the east.

Hauz Khas is also home to various diplomatic missions such as the ones of Albania, Iraq, Guinea Bissau, Burundi, and North Macedonia. Historically Hauz Khas was known as Hauz-e-Alai and is the place where Khusro Khan of Delhi Sultanate was defeated by Ghazi Malik (Governor of Dipalpur) in 1320.

Hauz Khas is witnessing the growth of trendy shops and lodgings. It is now becoming the centre for domestic and international tourists and backpackers. The area also is home to historical monuments and has easy access to the Delhi Metro, making it a preferred location for many visitors to India and domestic middle-class visitors from other Indian states. The area attracts young tourists with numerous hostels and cafes.

== History ==
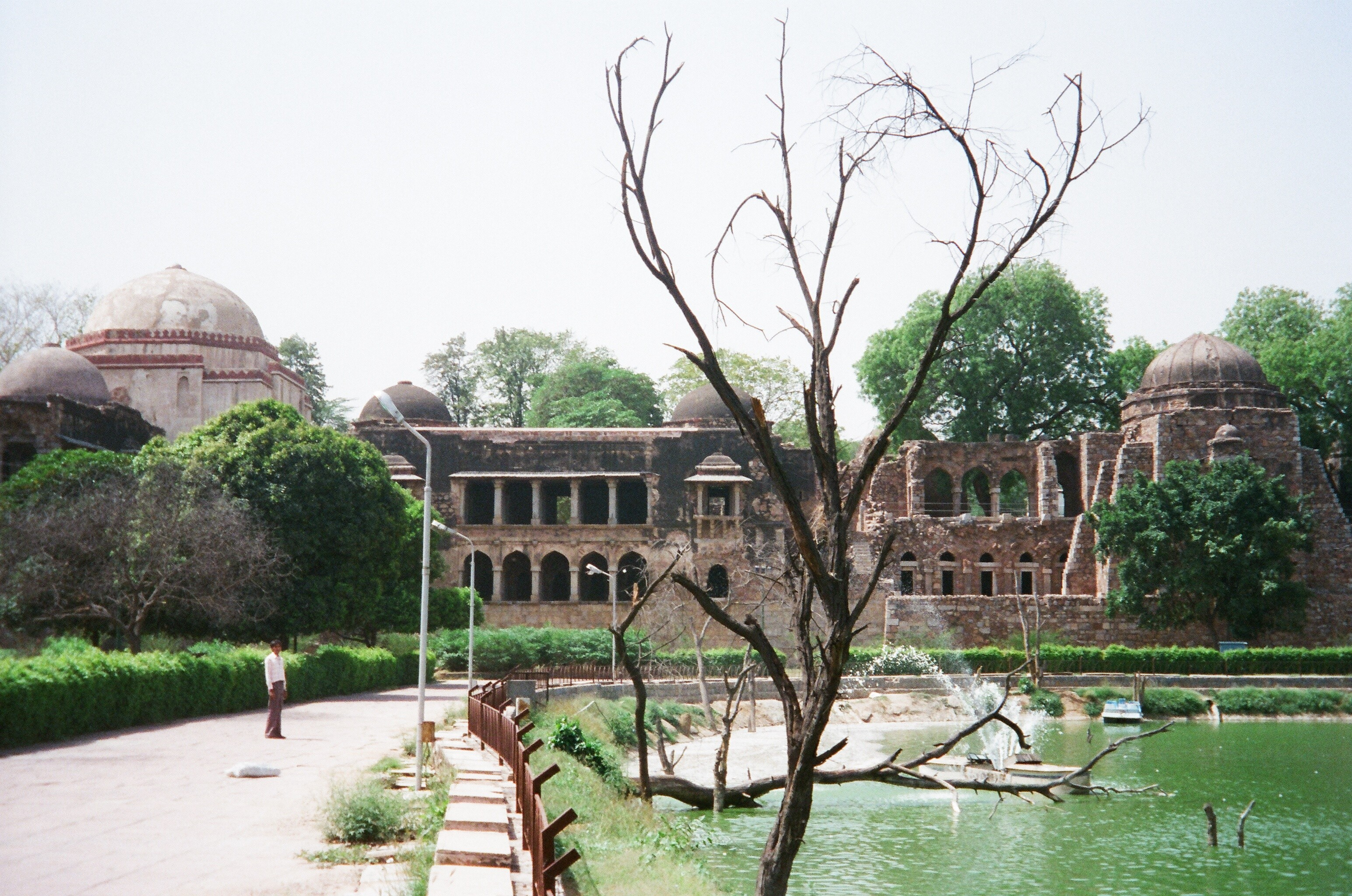
Firuz Shah Tughlaq's tomb with adjoining Madrasa and the Hauz Khas, the "royal tank".

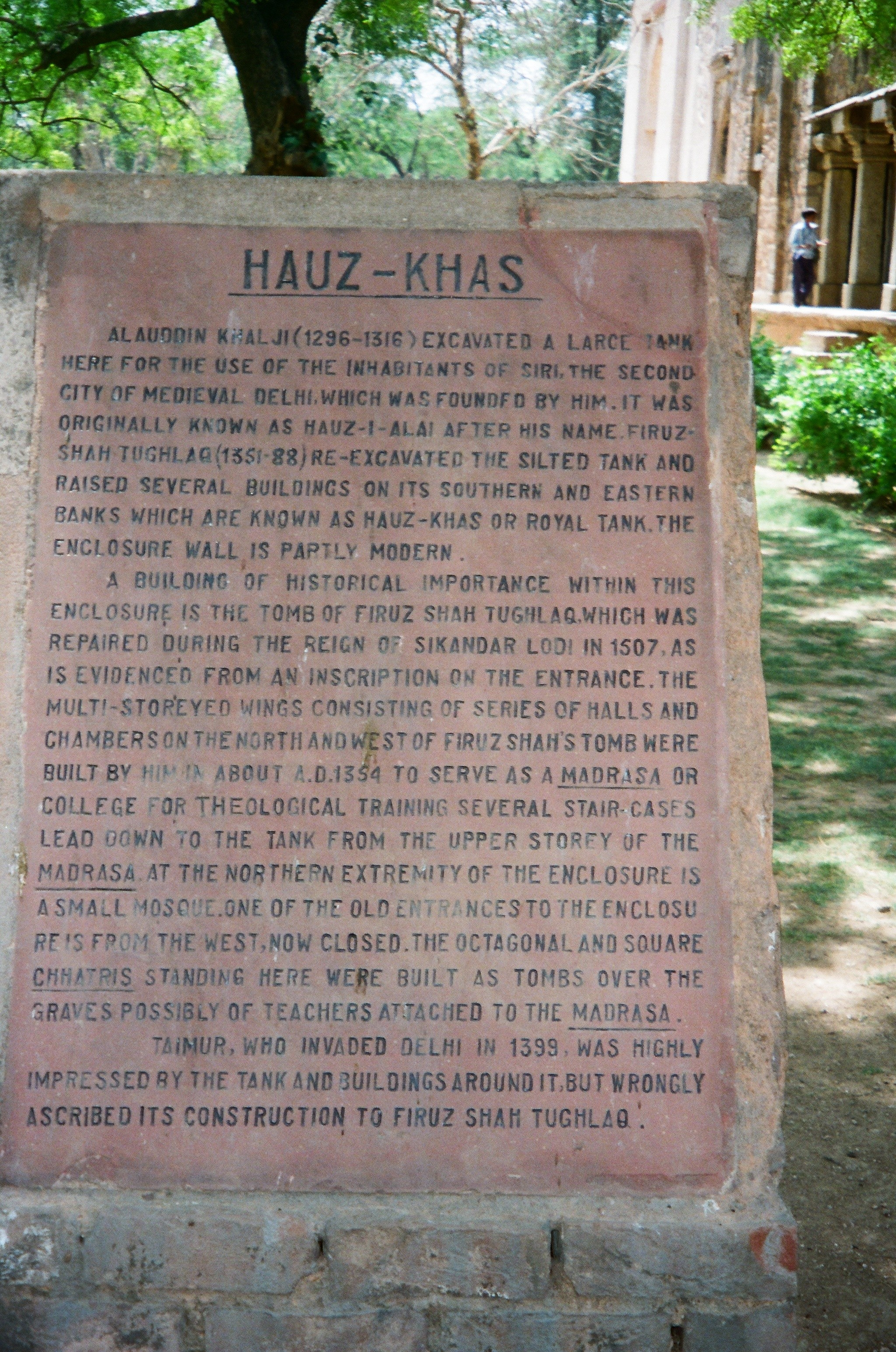
A plaque at the entrance of Hauz Khas Complex

Hauz Khas is named after an ancient water reservoir by the same name, now part of the extensive Hauz Khas Complex. In Urdu language, Hauz means 'water tank' (or 'lake') and khas means 'royal', giving it the meaning of 'royal tank'. The large water tank or reservoir was first built by Alauddin Khalji (r. 1296–1316) (the plaque displayed at the site records this fact) to supply water to the inhabitants of Siri Fort.

== Geography ==
It was developed during the 1960s by Delhi Land & Finance (DLF) as the Hauz Khas Enclave. Later it was made a district of South Delhi encompassing some more neighbouring areas.
Hauz Khas (Enclave) as known, consists of A, B, C, D, E, F, G, H, K, L, M, P, Q, R, X, Y, and Z Blocks.

E block is the Main market here and lies in the middle of the colony. It includes a multi-level parking lot. G block and Aurobindo Market are other markets close by.

Mayfair Gardens is an independent small private colony inside Hauz Khas, neighboured by Padmini Enclave.

Hauz Khas has some of the largest green areas in Delhi, namely Deer Park and Rose garden.
It is near the two major hospitals in Delhi, AIIMS and Safdarjung Hospital.

As Hauz Khas now is administered as a district, it is also known as a reference for other areas like Mayfair Gardens, Padmini Enclave, Safdarjung Enclave, Hauz Khas Village, Kalu Sarai, IIT Delhi, ISI Delhi, Shahpur Jat, Asiad Village, Katwaria Sarai and institutional areas like on Sirifort Road and Aurobindo Marg.

== Hauz Khas village ==
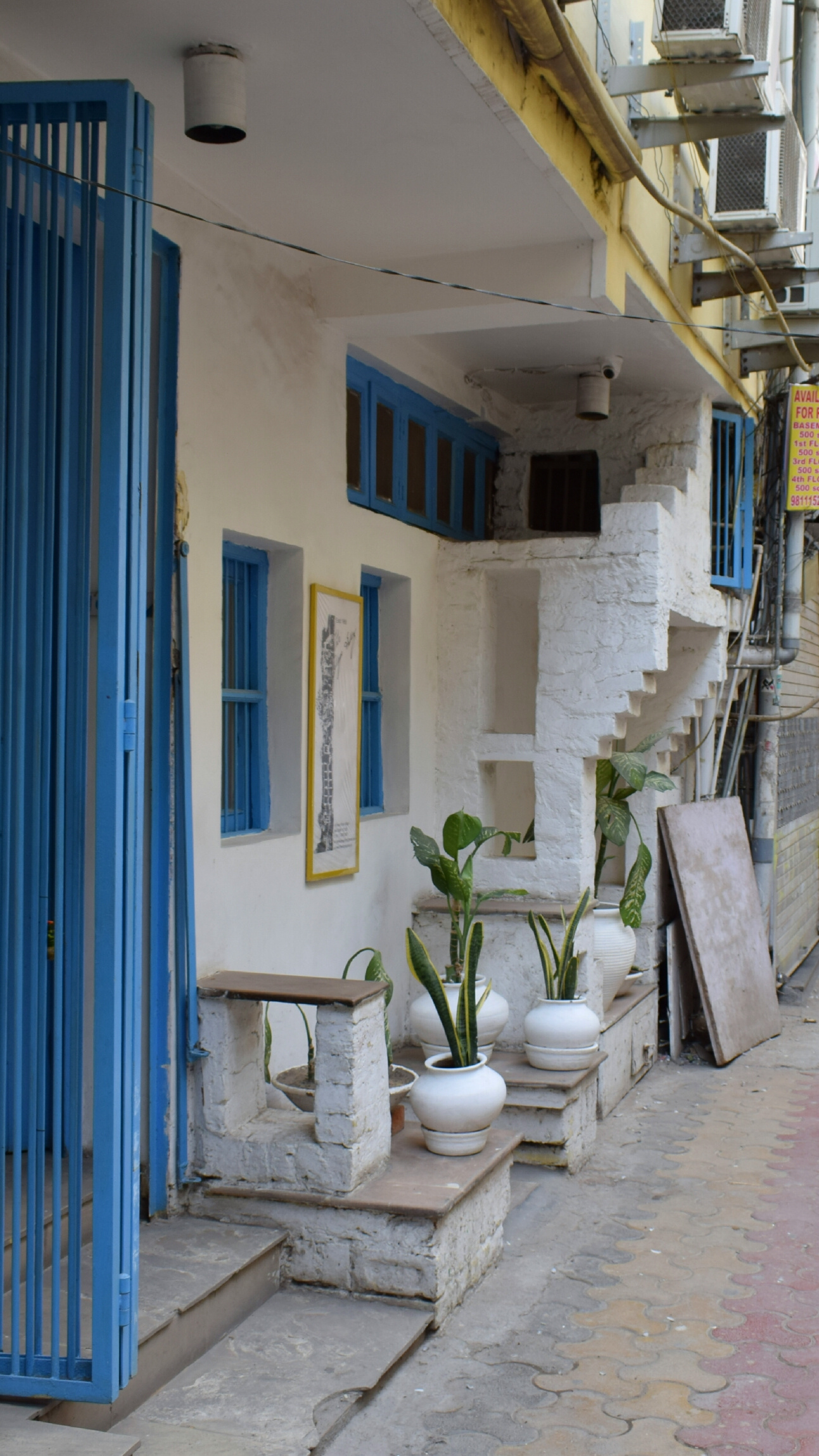
An art gallery in the Hauz Khas village.

Hauz Khas village is a historic habitation around the region of the Hauz Khas Complex, dating to much before establishment of South Delhi city. It existed as an urban village at the edge of the larger Hauz Khas area, developed by DLF after the 1960s. The village area started getting modernised in the mid-1980s when designer boutiques of fashion designers like Bina Ramani (Once Upon a Time), started moving in. Then, in the late 1990s, restaurants started coming up in the area, today it has around 50 restaurants, bars, pubs and cafes.

The success of Hauz Khas village has led to the development of Shahpur Jat and Lado Sarai as fashion and design markets also in the South Delhi area.

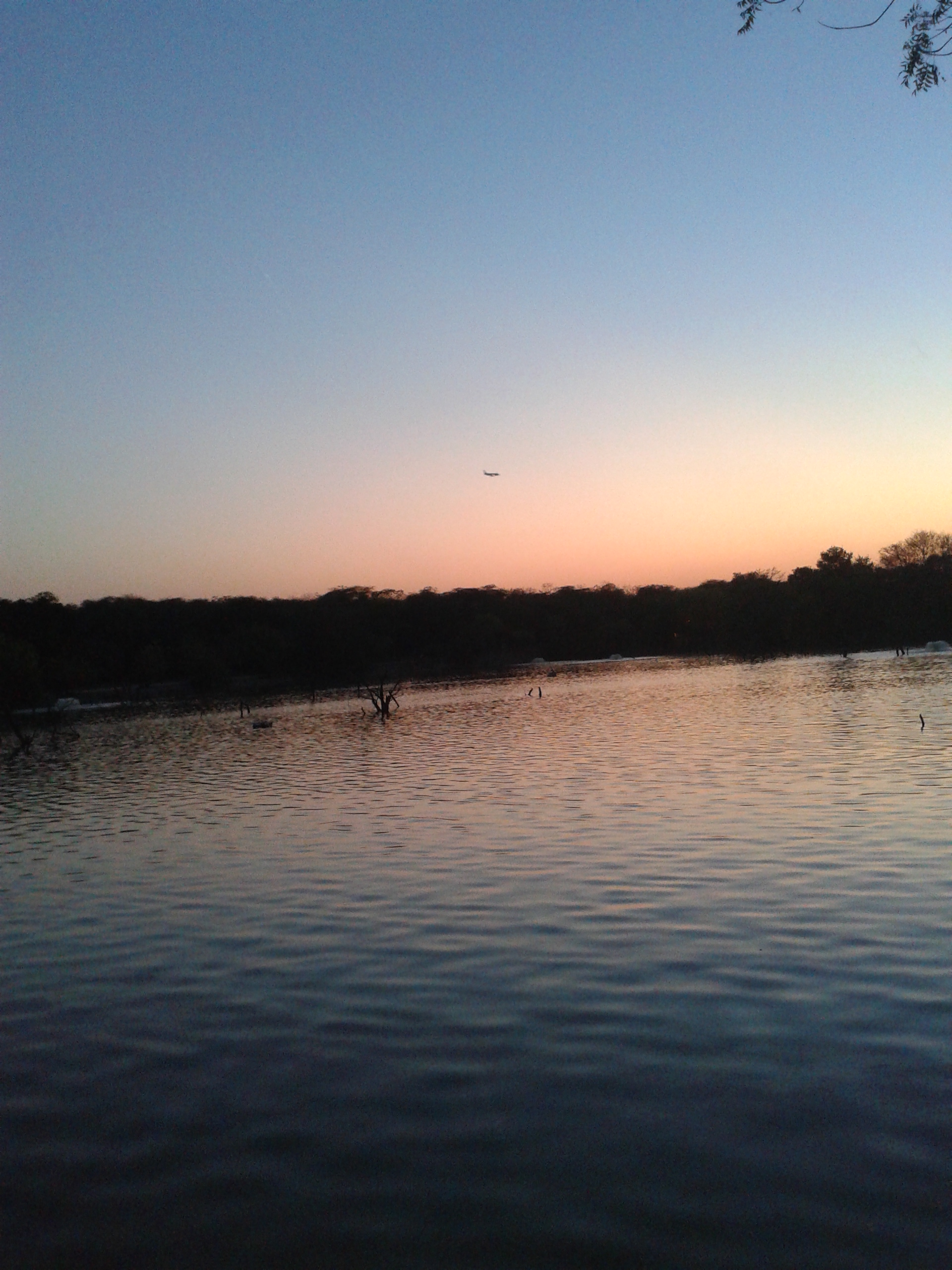
Lake in Hauz Khas Village in the year 2014.

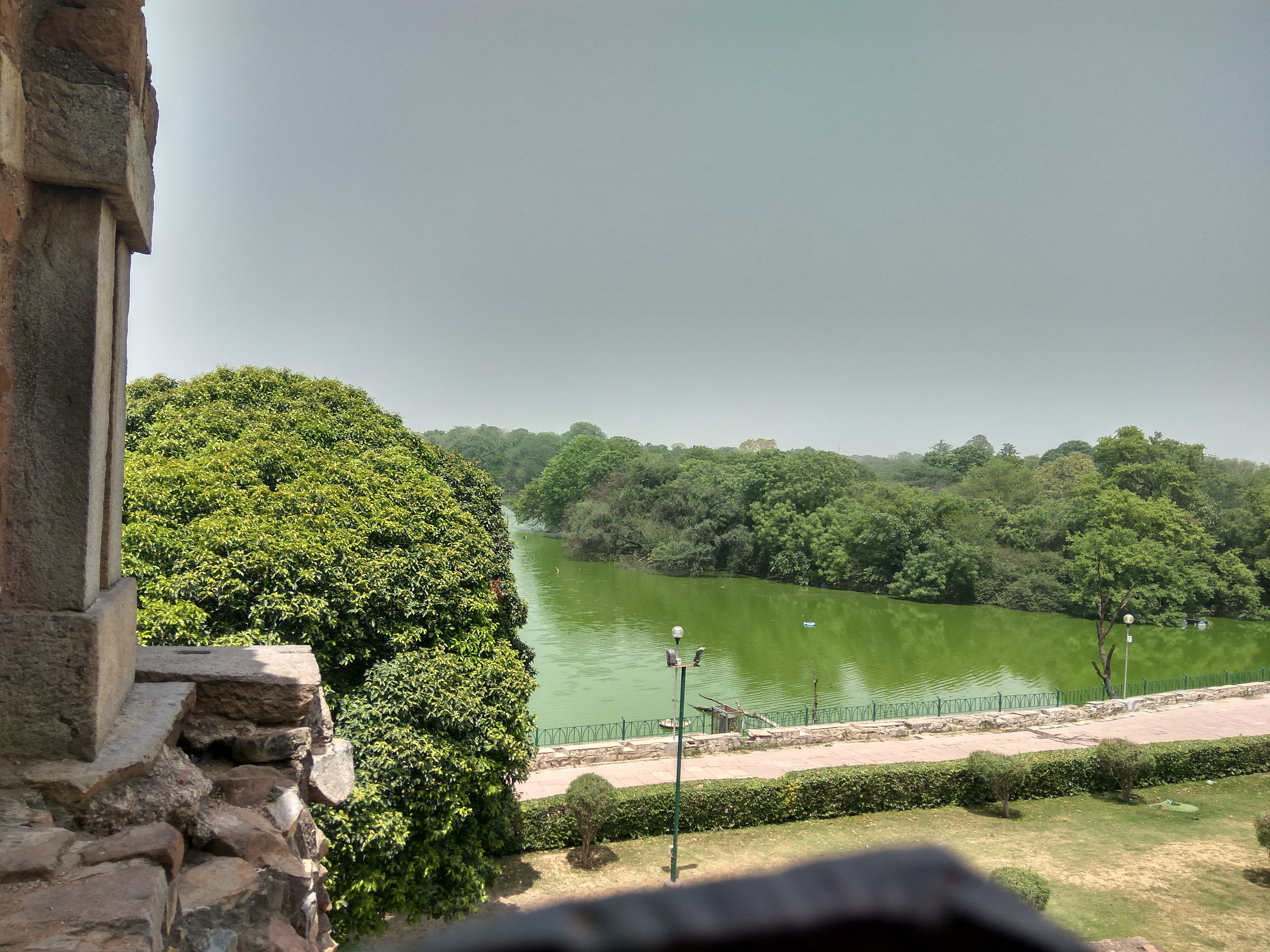
Skyview of lake

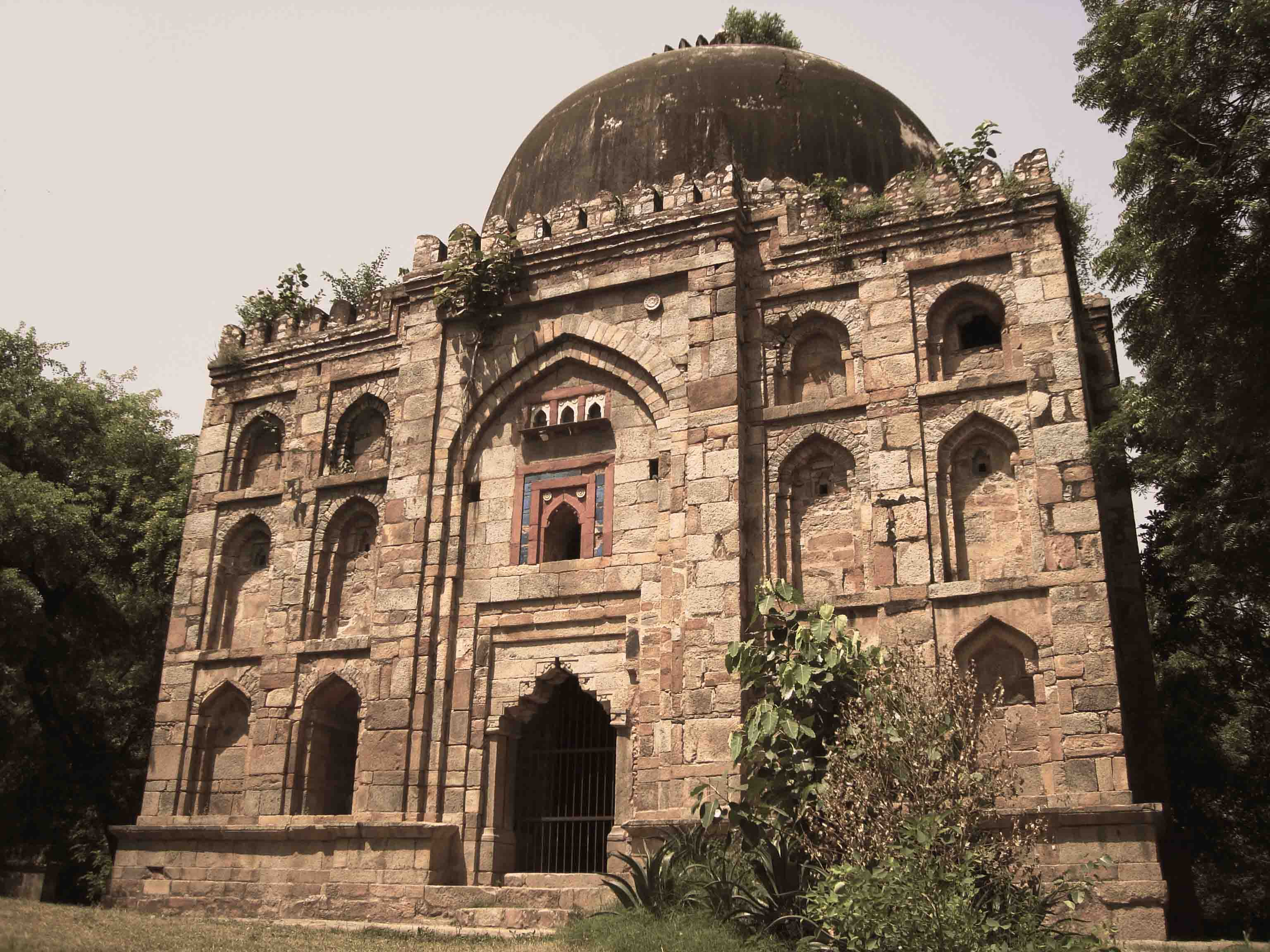
Islamic monument at Hauz Khas

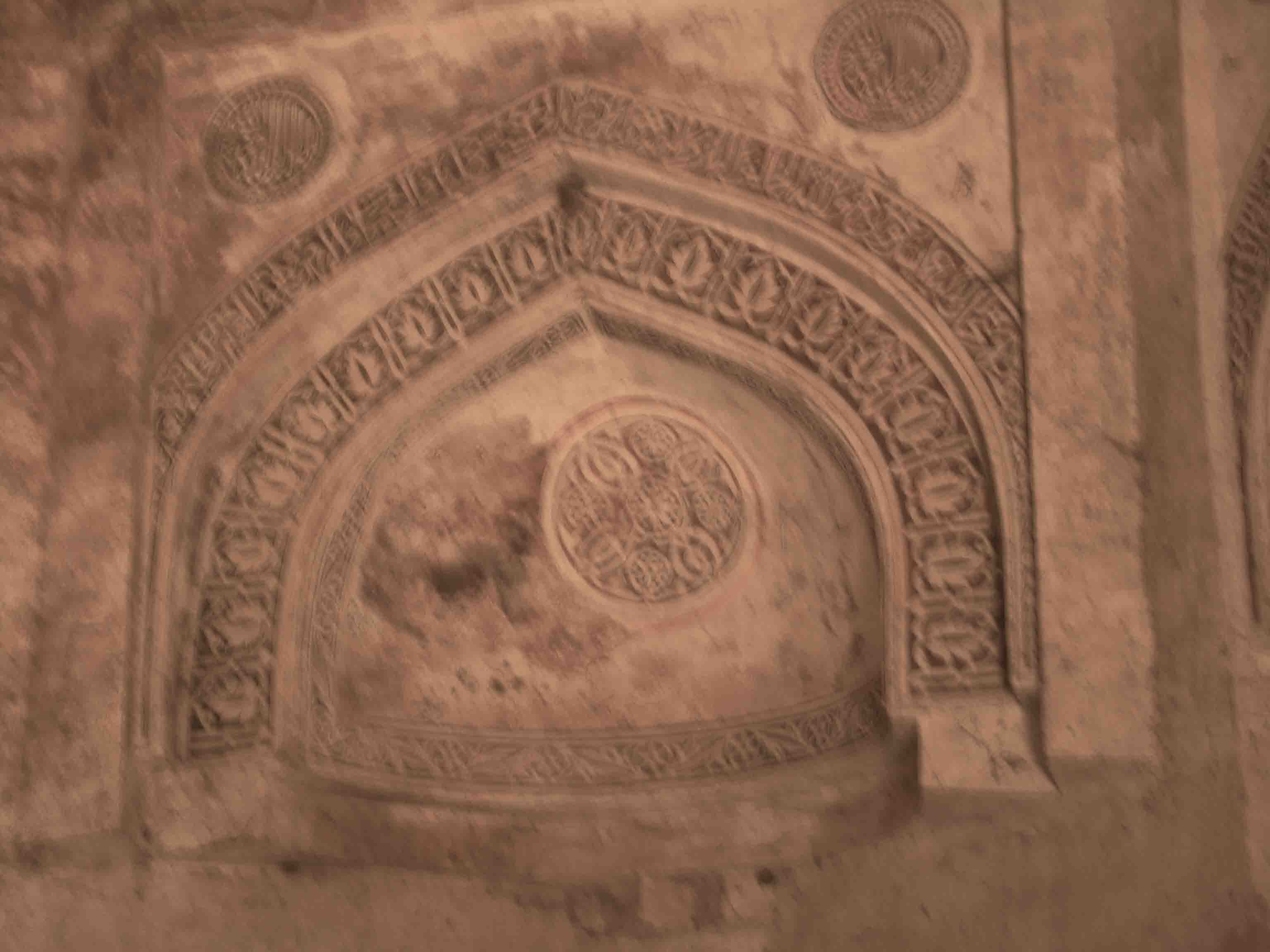
Arc and wall design

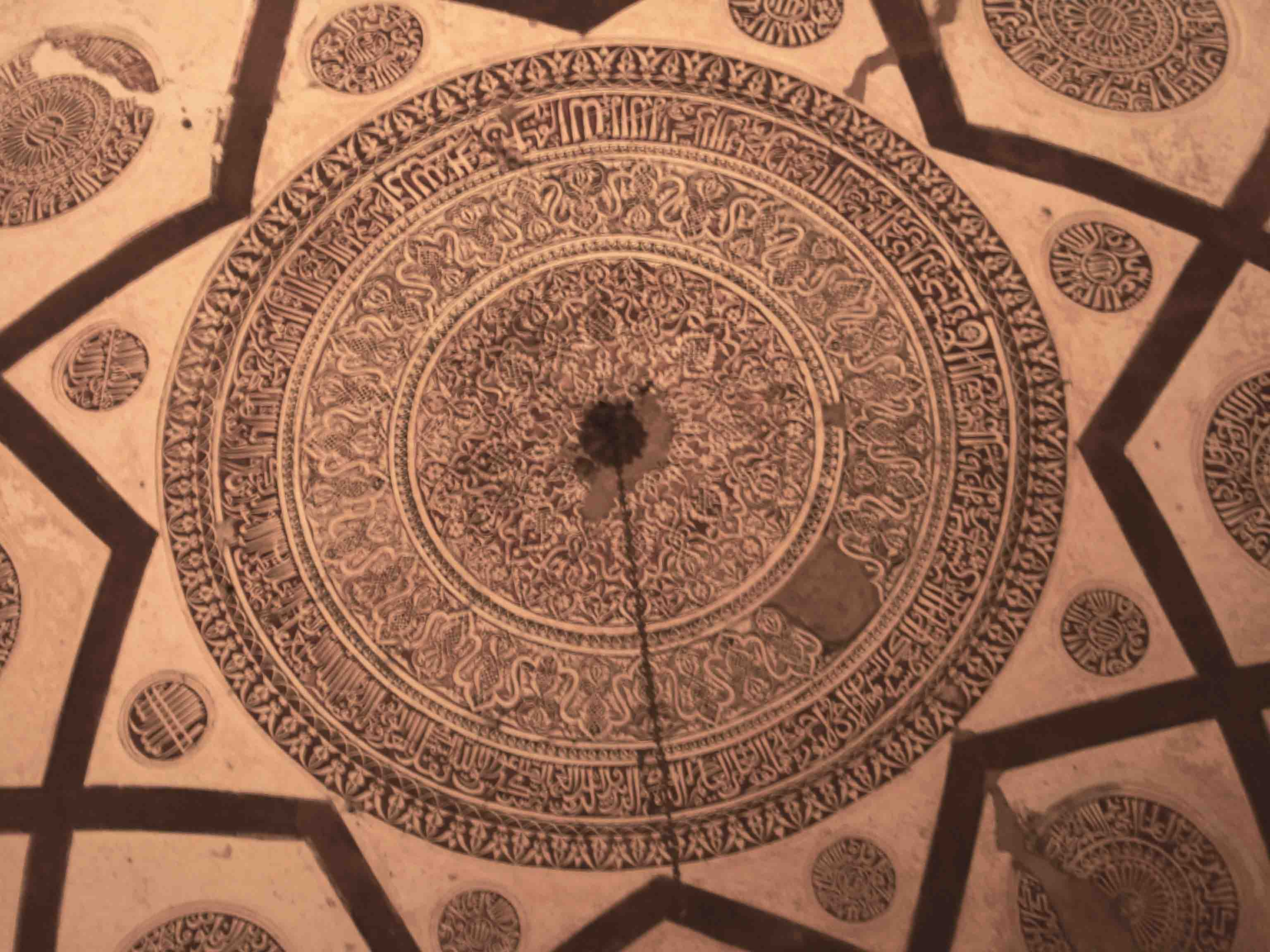
Dome design inside the tomb

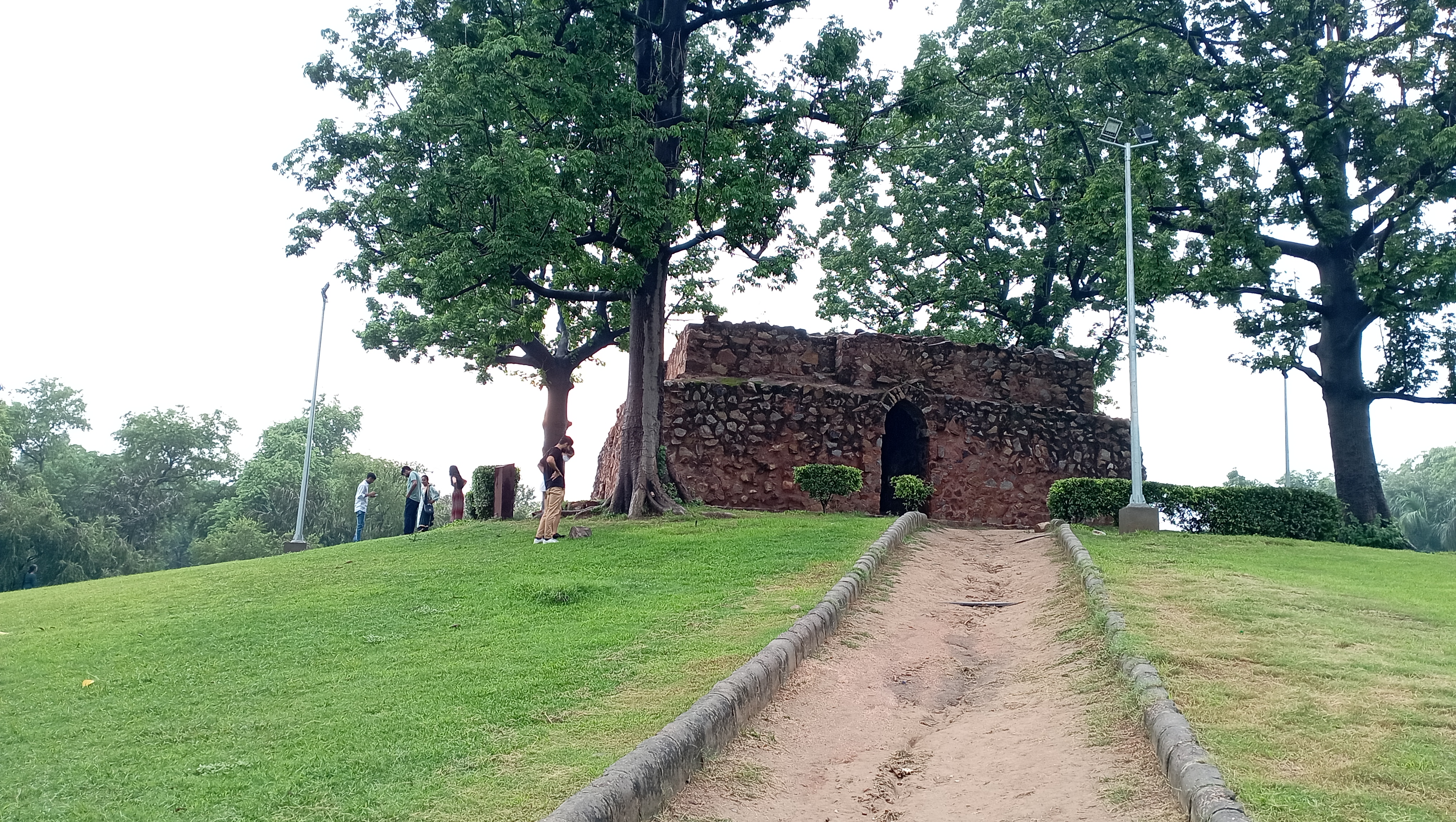
Munda Gumbad in Deer Park

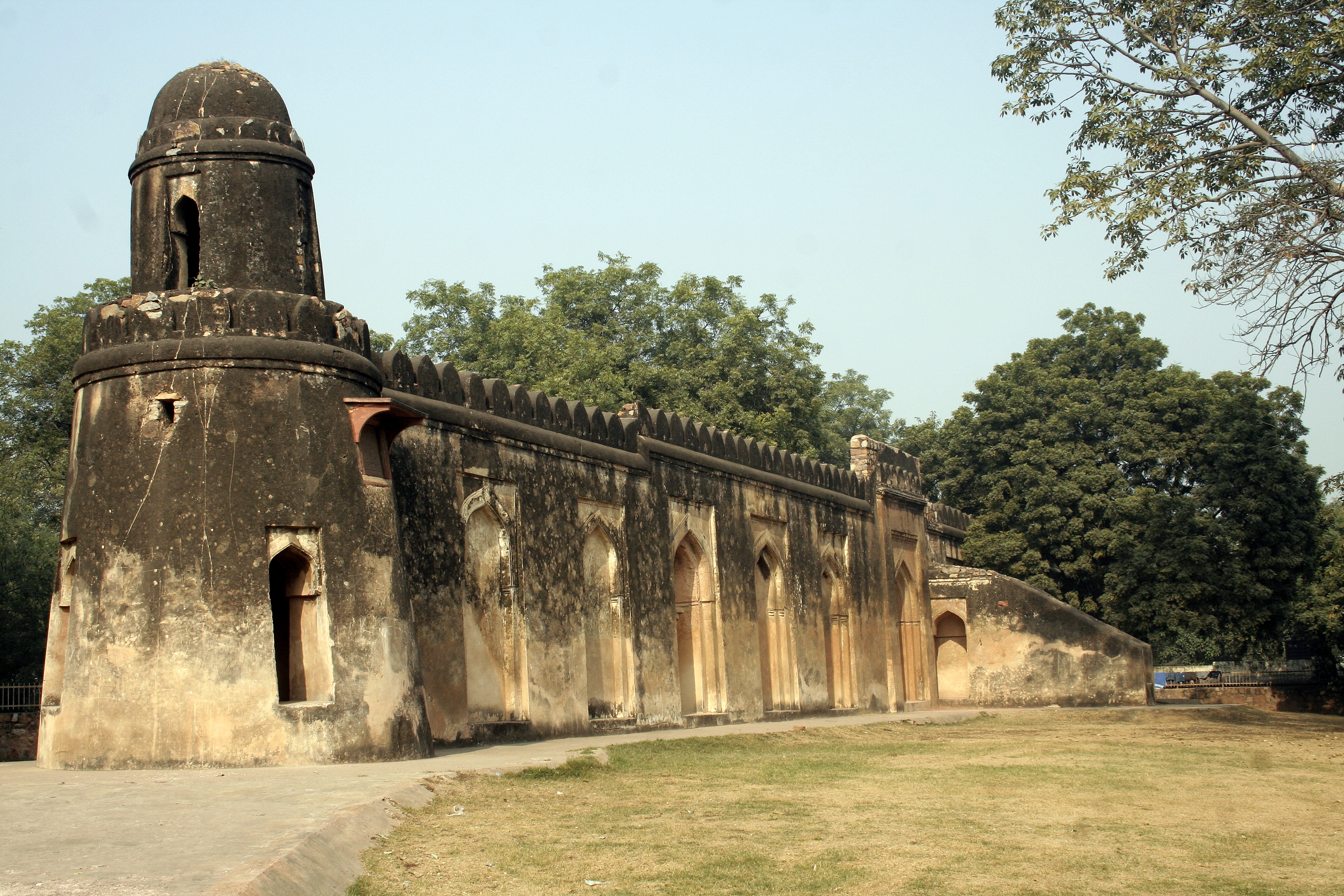
Idgah in Padmani Enclave

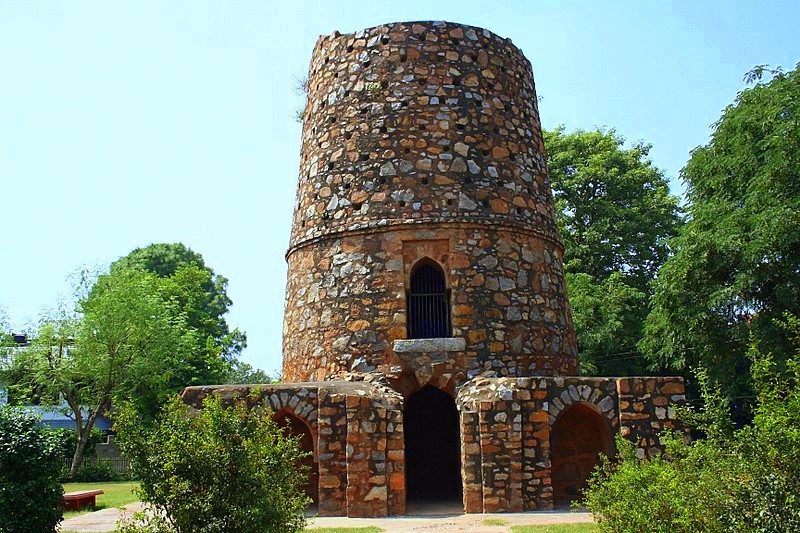
Chor Minar

== Points of interest and tourism ==
Historical Places like the Hauz Khas Complex which consists of the Hauz Khas Lake or Royal Tank, a mosque and a tomb, all from the time of the Khalji dynasty. Neeli Masjid and Chor Minar, where the heads of executed thieves (chor) would be put on display in the earlier days, lie inside the colony.

Nearby landmarks include Siri Fort Auditorium, Siri Fort Sports Complex, HUDCO Place and Yusuf Sarai Community Centre.

Hauz Khas is witnessing the growth of trendy shops and lodgings. It is now becoming the centre for domestic and international tourists and backpackers. The area also is home to historical monuments and has easy access to the Delhi Metro, making it a preferred location for many visitors to India and domestic middle-class visitors from other Indian states. The area attracts young tourists with numerous hip hostels and cafes.

== Accessibility ==
The domestic terminal of Indira Gandhi International Airport (Terminal 1) is 11 kilometres (6.8 mi) from Hauz Khas while the international terminal (Terminal 3) is 16 kilometres (9.9 mi).

Hazrat Nizamuddin railway station lies 8 kilometres (5.0 mi) away.

The Hauz Khas Metro Station (Yellow and Magenta Lines) is situated towards the Outer Ring Road.

The Hauz Khas Bus Stand is also situated towards the Outer Ring Road.

== Education ==
Hauz Khas houses engineering and management colleges like the Indian Institute of Technology Delhi and the Indian Institute of Foreign Trade. Hauz Khas also houses the fashion college National Institute of Fashion Technology.

Hauz Khas also contains private schools such as Laxman Public School and General Raj's School and a school run by the Aurobindo society Mother's International School with Sahoday Senior Secondary School. Due to the nearby location of the Indian Institute of Technology, Delhi, the area of Kalu Sarai has developed into an educational hub, with many private cram schools, for helping students pass the admission tests of Indian Institutes of Technology and All India Institute of Medical Sciences, and prestigious exams like Kishore Vaigyanik Protsahan Yojana, National Talent Search Examination, International Mathematics Olympiad, and other competitive tests conducted in India. It also houses Institute of Home Economics, which is a college of University of Delhi, and St. Anthony's senior secondary school.

== Nearby ==
Fastbooktrip, Institute of Home Economics, Gaudiya Math, Panchshila Club, Chor Minar, IDGAH, DDA Sarvpriya Vihar Park
