= Institute of Home Economics =

College in Delhi, India

Coordinates: 28.546521°N 77.206580°E

- Motto: Kartavya Sarva Sadhakarm
- Type: Public
- Established: 1961
- Affiliations: University of Delhi
- Chairperson: Prof. Surender Kumar
- Director: Prof. (Dr.) Radhika Bakhshi
- Location: Delhi, India
- Campus: Urban

The Institute of Home Economics (IHE) is a girls' college of the University of Delhi.

== History ==
The Institute of Home Economics was founded in 1961, by Dr. (Mrs.) S. Malhan, the founder Director, to give women wider educational and professional avenues. The Institute became a leading centre for women’s education in the country.

Since 1969, the Institute has been part of the University of Delhi as a constituent college. Since then, the college has expanded. Though it was started as a Home Science college, it has expanded and offers a three-year undergraduate course in Microbiology as well as a four-year integrated course in Elementary education. From the current academic year, the college is offering the three-year B.Sc. (Hons) course in Biochemistry. The Institute originally only offered a two-year Diploma course in Home Science, but then offered regular degree courses at the undergraduate and post-graduate level, a post-graduate diploma course in addition to Ph.D. programmes.

== Programmes ==
Under the aegis of its affiliate Delhi University, the college offers undergraduate, postgraduate, short-term and doctorate courses in following programmes.

=== Undergraduate programmes ===
- Bachelor of Science (B.Sc.) in Home Science (Honours)
- Bachelor of Science (B.Sc.) in Home Science (Pass)
- Bachelor of Arts (B.A.) in Journalism
- Bachelor of Science (B.Sc.) in Food Technology
- Bachelor of Elementary Education (B.El.Ed)
- Microbiology
- Biochemistry

=== Postgraduate programmes ===
- Master of Science (M.Sc.) in Fabric and Apparel Sciences
- Master of Science (M.Sc.) in Foods and Nutrition
- Diploma in Dietetics and Public Health Nutrition
- Diploma in Health and Social Gerontology

=== Short-term programmes ===
The college offers short-term courses in-

- Nutrition for Health Sports and Fitness
- Early Childhood Care and Education
- Management of Individual and Emotional Well-being
- Event Management and AUTOCAD & Interior Designing
- Radio Jockeying
- Computer-Aided Designing

=== Doctorate degree ===
The college offers doctorate degree (P.hD) in Home Science as per as the norms of University of Delhi (India).

== Infrastructure ==
The Institute moved to its present building at Hauz Khas Enclave in 2001. The institute is just opposite of Hauz Khas Metro Station. The building is housed in a 3.5-acre (14,000 m^{2}) plot area. With the foundation stone being laid by the then President Giani Zail Singh in 1987, the building was inaugurated by the Vice-Chancellor, Delhi University, Prof. Deepak Nayyar in 2001. The campus is well endowed with manicured lawns, spacious lecture theaters and laboratories. The Institute has an All India Charter catering to students from various countries of Asia and Africa. There are about 800 students attending at present.

== Faculties ==
The Institute has a very well qualified and experienced faculty, giving a high standard of education to the students. The faculty has been actively involved in research work which has been recognized worldwide and been published in foremost publications in the respective fields. The faculty also participates in national and international conferences, seminars and workshops and has technical and professional affiliations.
