= Jia Sarai =

Coordinates: 28°33′N 77°11′E

- Neighborhood of Delhi
- Location in Delhi, India
- Country: India
- State: Delhi

Languages
  - Official: Hindi
- Time zone: UTC+5:30 (IST)
- Pin Code: 110016

Jia Sarai is an urban village located in South Delhi, New Delhi, India. It is one of three villages along with Ber Sarai and Katwaria Sarai that border the campus of the Indian Institute of Technology (IIT) Delhi. Jia Sarai is one of the fifteen historically recognised Gaur Brahmin villages of Delhi.

== History ==
The village derives its name from Pandit Jiaram, a Gaur Brahmin who migrated to the area from present-day Rohtak in Haryana approximately two and a half centuries ago, during the later phase of the Mughal period. Until the mid-twentieth century, Jia Sarai functioned as a rural settlement inhabited predominantly by Gaur Brahmin families engaged in agriculture and cattle rearing, with limited interaction with the surrounding region.

A major transformation began in 1954, when a substantial portion of village land was acquired by the central government for the establishment of IIT Delhi as part of India’s post-Independence state-led industrial and educational development. The loss of agricultural land, followed by rapid urban expansion in South Delhi, gradually altered the economic and social structure of the village.

By the late twentieth century, Jia Sarai had been incorporated into the expanding urban fabric of Delhi and classified as an urban village. Owing to its proximity to institutions such as IIT Delhi and Jawaharlal Nehru University, it developed into a significant centre for students preparing for competitive examinations. Over time, rental housing and student-related services became central to the village economy.

Jia Sarai has also been associated with notable individuals, including Bhai Trilochan Singh Panesar, also known as Veerji, who belonged to the village.

== See also ==
Samhalka
