= South Delhi district =

- District of Delhi
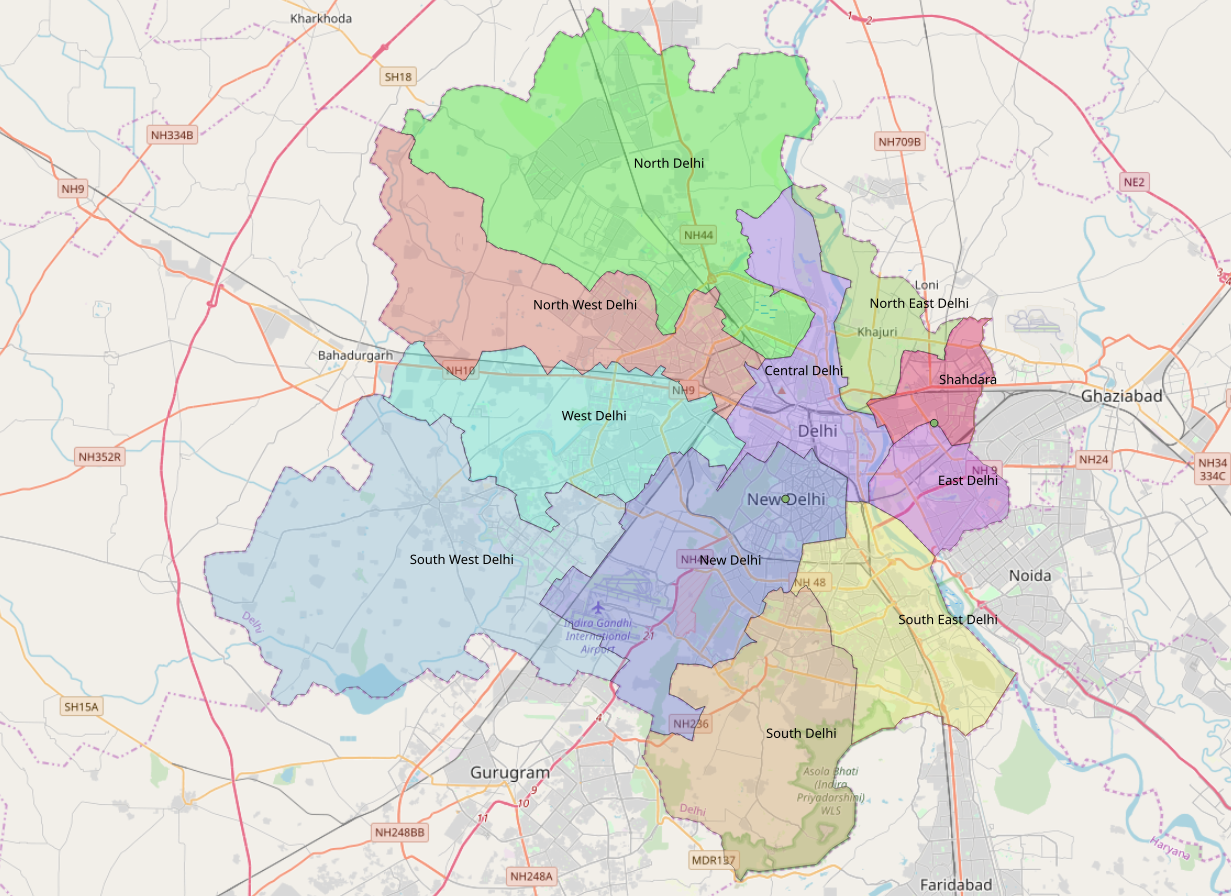
- Location in Delhi, India
- Coordinates: 28.5549°N 77.1919°E
- Country: India
- State: Delhi
- Headquarters: Saket

Government
  - Body: GNCT of Delhi
  - District magistrate: Mekala Chaitanya Prasad, IAS

Area
  - Total: 250 km^{2} (97 sq mi)
- Elevation: 241 m (791 ft)

Population (2011)
  - Total: 2,731,929
  - Density: 11,000/km^{2} (28,000/sq mi)

Languages
  - Official: Hindi, English, Punjabi, Urdu
- Time zone: UTC+5:30 (IST)
- PIN: 1100xx
- Nearest city: Faridabad, Gurgaon
- Lok Sabha constituency: South Delhi
- Civic agency: South Delhi Municipal Corporation
- Website: dmsouth.delhi.gov.in

South Delhi district is an administrative district of the National Capital Territory of Delhi in India with its headquarters in Saket. Administratively, the district is divided into three subdivisions, Saket, Hauz Khas, and Mehrauli. It is bounded by the Yamuna River to the east, the districts of New Delhi to the north, Faridabad district of Haryana to the southeast, Gurgaon District of Haryana to the southwest, and South West Delhi to the west.

South Delhi has a population of 2,731,929 (2011 census), and an area of 250 square kilometres (97 sq mi), with a population density of 9,034 persons per km^{2} (23,397 persons per mi^{2}).

The South Delhi neighborhood of Hauz Khas is witnessing the growth of trendy shops and lodgings. It is now becoming the center for domestic and international tourists and backpackers. The area also is home to historical monuments and has easy access to the Delhi Metro, making it a preferred location for many visitors to India and domestic middle-class visitors from other Indian states. The area attracts young tourists with numerous hip hostels and cafes.

The division shown on the map bears only administrative significance, as to the common citizen, broadly speaking Delhi is vaguely ring-like, having five regions, namely North, West, South, East and Central. The usage of the term South Delhi in day-to-day life expands from Delhi's IGI Airport in the New Delhi district to the river Yamuna in the South East, a region protruding into administrative South West Delhi district.

== History ==
South Delhi is a vast area in the city of Delhi and contains many significant locations. Of the eleven 'historical cities' of Delhi, three, viz. Qila Rai Pithora (1st), Mehrauli (2nd) and Siri (including Hauz Khas) (3rd) fall in the South Delhi district. It was originally created after the construction of New Delhi.

Jahaz Mahal, Zafar Mahal, Hauz Khas Complex, Bijay Mandal, Qutub Minar, Mehrauli Archaeological Park, and the Safdarjung's Tomb comprise some of South Delhi's most scenic heritage sites.

== Geography ==
The administrative district had 20% green cover, as of 2009. It has several spacious green parks, wildlife sanctuary, biodiversity parks, and green belts. Deer Park and Rose Garden in Hauz Khas, Asola Wildlife Sanctuary close to Delhi's southern border on the Aravallis foothills are few examples. It has a good mix of concrete and greens.

== Demographics ==
Historical population
Year	Pop.	±% p.a.
1961	314,789	—
1971	589,956	+6.48%
1981	986,856	+5.28%
1991	1,501,881	+4.29%
2001	2,267,023	+4.20%
2011	2,731,929	+1.88%

According to the 2011 census South Delhi has a total population of 2,731,929, comprising 1,467,428 males (53.8%) and 1,264,501 females (46.2%), roughly equal to the nation of Jamaica or the US state of Nevada. This gives it a ranking of 144th in India (out of a total of 640). The district has a population density of 10,935 inhabitants per square kilometre (28,320/sq mi). Its population growth rate over the decade 2001–2011 was 20.59%.

The religious composition of the population is predominantly Hindu, making up 78.8% (2,155,759 adherents), followed by Muslims at 16.3% (445,914). Other religious communities include Christians, numbering 1.5% (41,880); Sikhs, with 2.5% (69,520); Buddhists at 0.1% (3,862); and Jains, totaling 0.4% (11,020).

== Economy ==
Many renowned markets of Delhi such as Sarojini Nagar Market, Green Park Market, etc. and malls such as DLF Avenue, MGF Metropolitan, Select Citywalk, Malviya Nagar, etc. are located in South Delhi.

== Administrative divisions ==
South Delhi has three administrative divisions:

- Hauz Khas
- Mehrauli
- Saket

== Transport ==
=== Roadways ===
Many important city roads, such as Mehrauli-Gurgaon Road, Mehrauli-Badarpur Road, Aurobindo Marg, August Kranti Marg, Press Enclave Road, etc. fall in this district, while arterial roads like Inner Ring Road and Outer Ring Road also pass through the area.

=== Railways ===
The nearest railway station is Hazrat Nizamuddin railway station. Two lines of the Delhi Metro, namely the Yellow and Magenta lines, pass through the district.

=== Airways ===
The nearest airport is Indira Gandhi International Airport, located towards west of the district.

== Culture ==
South district is considered to be the most affluent of all residential districts of Delhi, other than the districts falling under Lutyen's Delhi, viz. New Delhi and Central Delhi. With upscale areas like Saket, Sainik Farm, Malviya Nagar, Hauz Khas, Greater Kailash, Green Park, Rama Krishna Puram, Gulmohar Park, Gulmohar enclave, Vasant Vihar and Vasant Kunj, it has one of the highest land prices in Delhi. Urban villages in South Delhi, like Hauz Khas Village, and Shahpur Jat have become hub for designer boutiques, restaurants and art galleries and design studios.

== Education ==
The Indian Institute of Technology Delhi, All India Institute of Medical Sciences and National Institute of Fashion Technology, three of the country's premier institutes in the field of technology, medicine and fashion respectively lie in the Hauz Khas locality of South Delhi. The Indian Institute of Foreign Trade of Delhi is located in the Qutub Institutional Area of South Delhi. Sangam Vihar is also located in South Delhi, which has the highest population in the state. The top Central University Jamia Millia Islamia is situated in the Jamia Nagar area of South Delhi. Further, University of Delhi South Campus which is one of the oldest universities in India has its southern campus in the region. The southern campus is a part of the proposed four direction-based campuses in Delhi with East and West campuses currently in progress.

== Importance ==
This district has thriving medieval era colonies or sarais, which now are severely congested and under neglect. These include Chirag Delhi, Kalu Sarai, Jia Sarai, Ber Sarai, Lado Sarai, Katwaria Sarai, Yusuf Sarai, Hauz Khas Village, Munirka, Kotla Mubarakpur, Begumpur, Saidulajaib, Mohammadpur, Khirki Village, Adhchini, Chhattarpur Village, Aayaa Nagar, Maandi Village, and Dera Village.

== See also ==
- Districts of Delhi
- Hauz Khas
- Moti Bagh
- Dwarka
- Rajpath
- Green Park
- South Delhi Municipal Corporation
