= Gulmohar enclave =

Upper-class neighborhood in South Delhi, India

Gulmohar Enclave is an upper-class neighborhood in South Delhi, India with 300 resident-owned apartments. These apartments were constructed in 1983 by the Delhi Development Authority. The prices of an MIG apartments as of September 2025 are valued at about ₹ 20 million while the Duplex and the Ground Floor apartments are over ₹ 35 million. This Housing Society is governed by a RWA Which is headed by a Secretary. The colony has adequate access to water, electricity and broadband internet. Nearby Markets are Gautam Nagar, Yusuf Sarai, Hauz Khas and Green Park Markets.

Adjacent to Gulmohar Park, the neighborhood is home to a number of parks and playgrounds and is serviced by the Green Park metro station through its Yellow Line. Nearby landmarks include Siri Fort Auditorium, Siri Fort Sports Complex, All India Institute of Medical Sciences, National Institute of Fashion Technology, and Indian Institute of Technology Delhi. It is also adjacent to the colonies of Green Park, Yusuf Sarai and Hauz Khas. It is also less than 2 kilometres (1.2 mi) from South Extension and R. K. Puram. Connaught Place, New Delhi Railway Station and Gurgaon are all directly accessible in 30 minutes or less by train. Other nearby transportation includes Indira Gandhi International Airport and Hazrat Nizamuddin Railway Station.

== Notable residents ==
- Raj Kumar Kapoor, producer and director known for Fauji
