= Green Park station =

Green Park station may refer to:

- Bath Green Park railway station, a former railway station in Bath, Somerset, UK
- Green Park metro station, a Delhi Metro station
- Green Park tube station, a London Underground station in Green Park, London, UK
- Reading Green Park railway station, a railway station in Reading, Berkshire, UK
