= Deer Park, Delhi =

Public park in South Delhi, Delhi

Deer Park
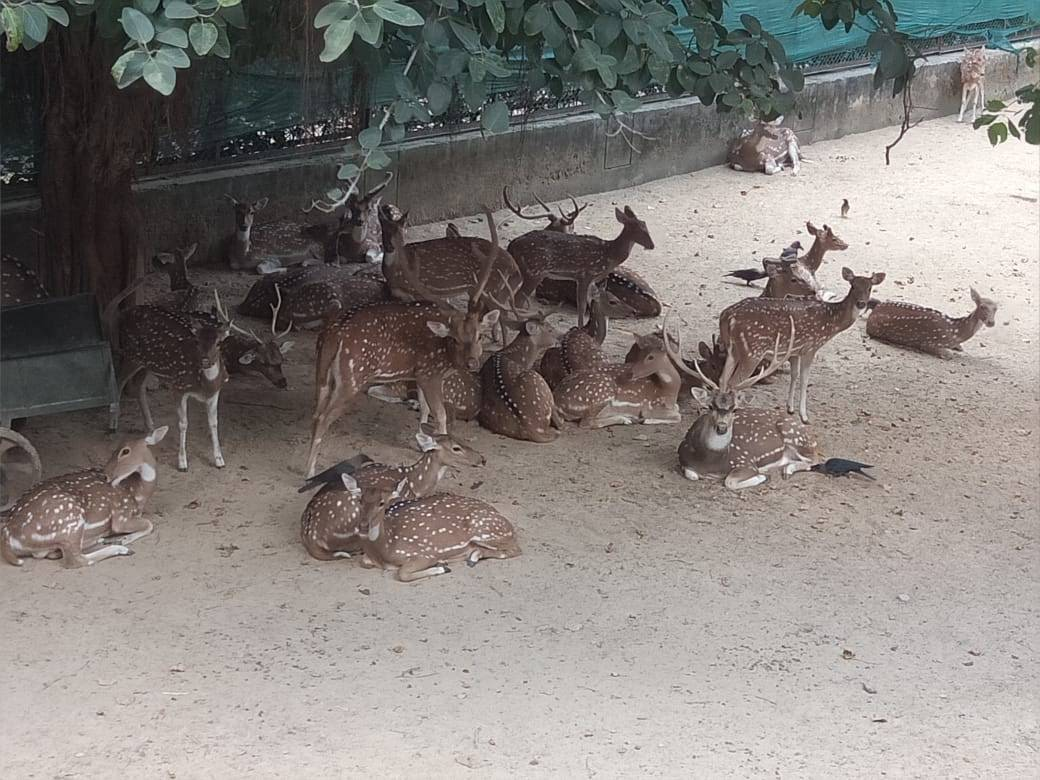
- Group of Deer in the Deer Park
- Interactive map of Deer Park
- Type: Nature park
- Location: Hauz Khas, South Delhi, India
- Coordinates: 28.5566°N 77.1959°E
- Area: 60 acres (24 ha; 0.094 mi^{2}; 0.24 km^{2})
- Created: 1295
- Operator: Delhi Development Authority
- Open: 5:00am-8:00pm (summer); 5:30am-7:00pm (winter)
- Status: Open

Deer Park, also known as Aditya Nath Jha Deer Park, is a natural park in Delhi located in the Hauz Khas subdivision of South Delhi. It was named after a famous social worker Aditya Nath Jha. This place is popular for walking, jogging and weekend outings. Deer Park comprises many subsections such as Duck Park, Picnic Spots, and Rabbit Enclosures. The park is accessible from Safdarjung Enclave, Green Park, and Hauz Khas Village. It is also connected to District Park making it approachable from R K Puram near the courts side of the Delhi Lawn Tennis Association (DLTA).

The Park has four different wings: Rose Garden, Deer Park, Fountain & District Park, Old Monuments and Hauz Khas Art Market.

The park houses a large number of deer inside the park. There is a large enclosure in the park for deer to roam around. Entry to the Deer Park and the surrounding green park is free and it is open everyday from 5:00 AM to 8:00 PM during summer till October and 5:30 AM to 7:00 PM during winter.

== Location ==
The Deer Park along with the connected District Park (that houses the Hauz Khas lake) and adjacent Rose Garden make up one of the largest green areas in New Delhi. They are collectively called "the lungs of Delhi" because they provide fresh air in the otherwise polluted hustling bustling mega metropolitan Delhi. The park is easy to arrive at from Hauz khas Village, Safdarjang Enclave and Delhi Lawn Tennis Associations Courts.

== Governance ==
The park is maintained by the Delhi Development Authority, a government planning authority.

== Landmarks and structures ==
=== Art and monuments ===
==== Structures ====
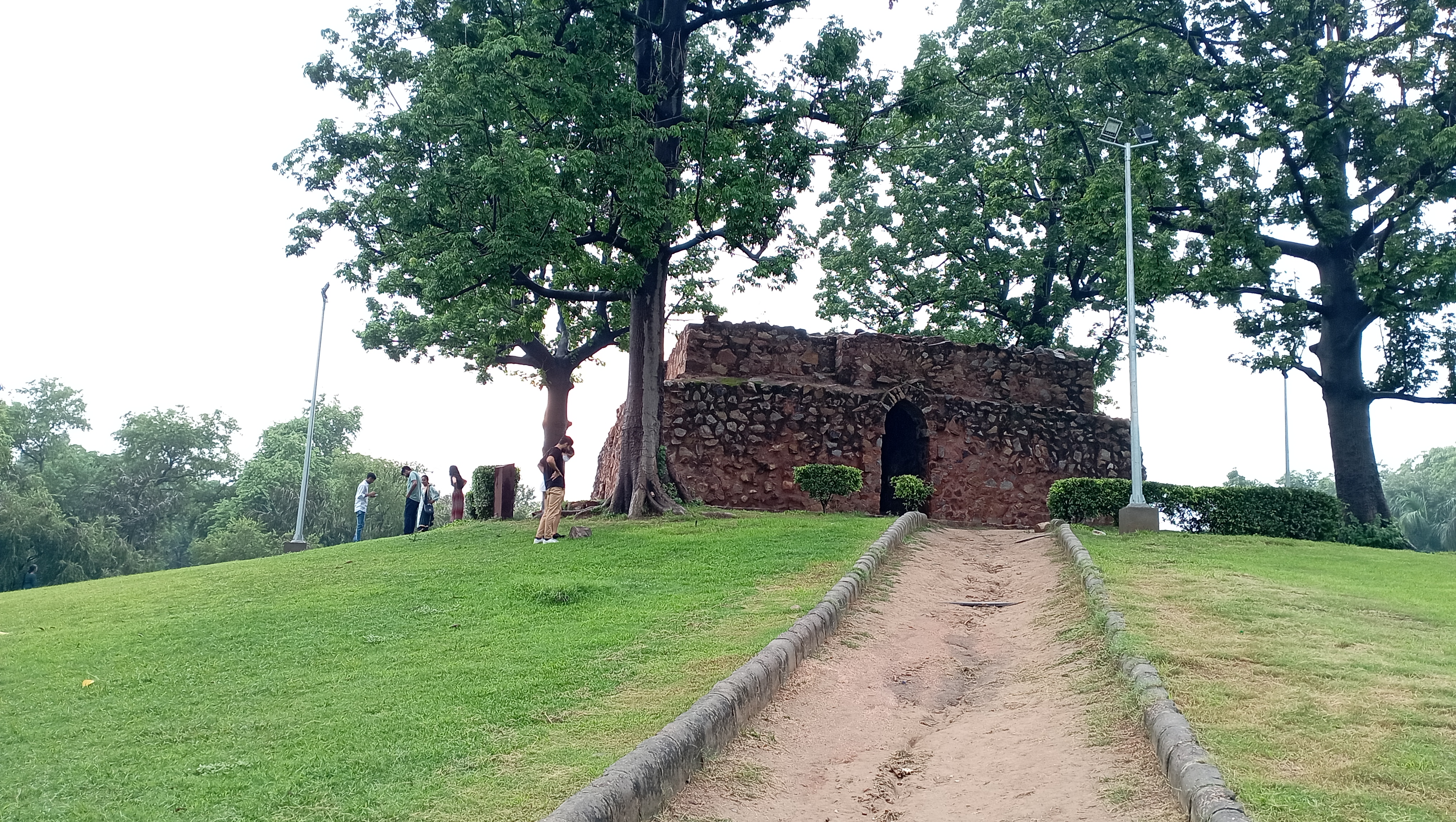
Munda Gumbad located inside Deer Park

Munda Gumbad (Persian: مُنْڈا گمباد, lit. 'Bald Tomb' or 'Domeless Tomb') is a rubble pavilion north west to the Hauz Khas lake. It is said to be once located at the center of the lake. The structure was built by Alauddin Khilji of the Khilji dynasty in 1295 AD.

The structure at the moment is built on a raised platform. It is square in shape, with arches on all four sides, allowing passage inside the inner chamber.

== Gallery ==
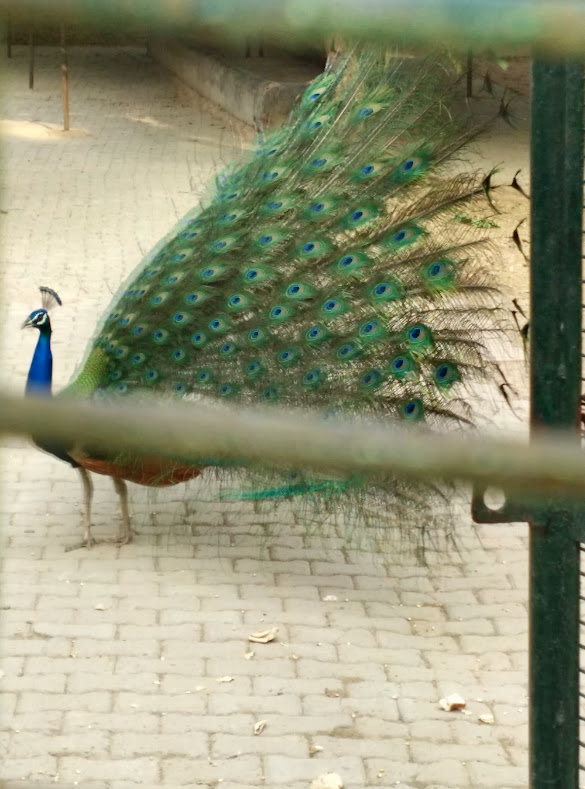
Peacock near Deer Park, New Delhi

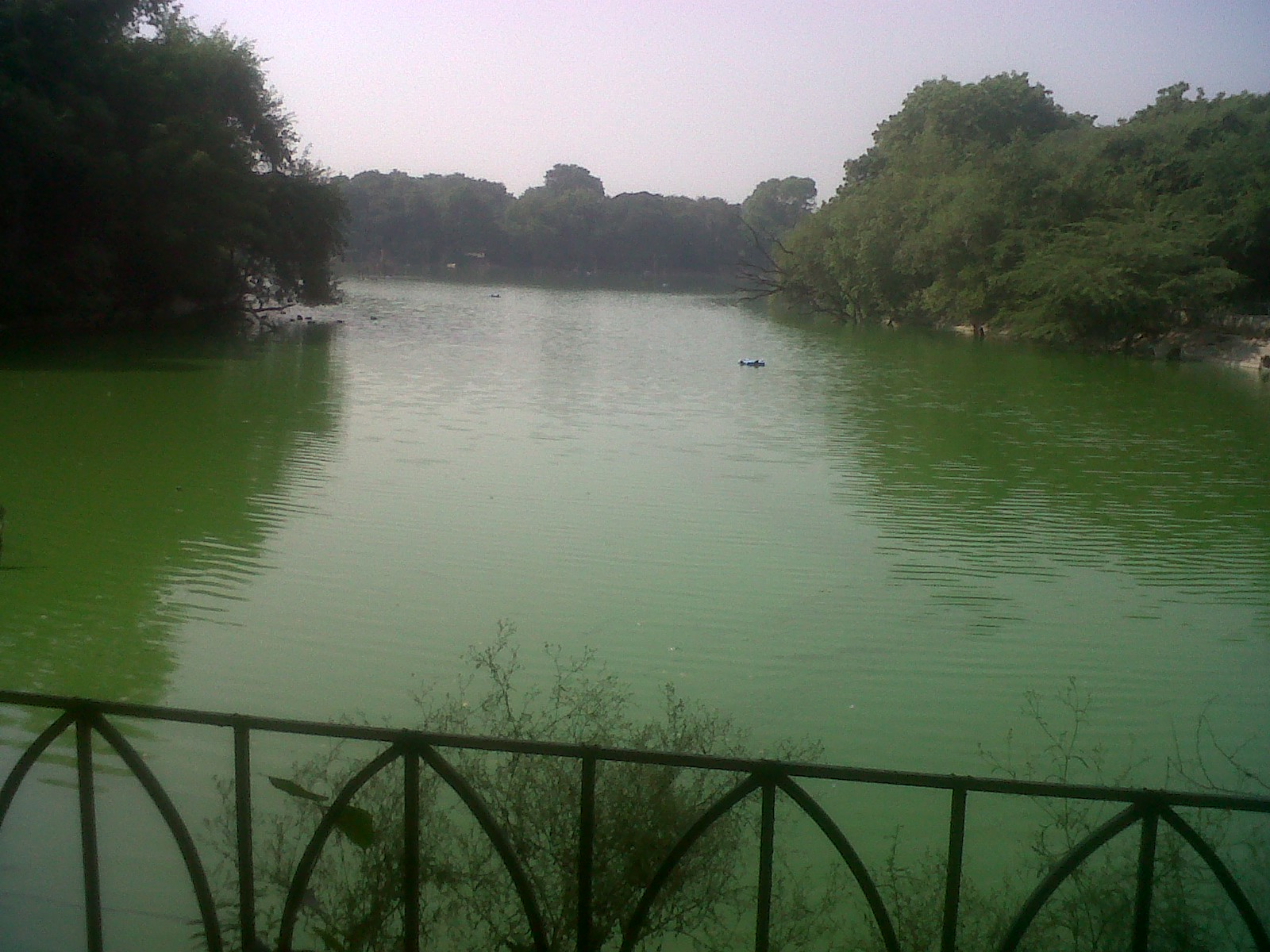
Hauz Khas Jheel located inside Deer Park

== See also ==
- List of parks in Delhi
