= Saket District Centre =

Commercial centre in New Delhi, India

Coordinates: 28.5282337°N 77.2160948°E

Saket District Centre is a commercial centre located in Pushp Vihar, New Delhi. The district centre has come up as the largest commercial and retail hub in South Delhi with numerous malls, restaurants and office buildings and plenty of parking space.

== Location ==
The Saket District Centre is located in Pushp Vihar, South Delhi, India.

== Features ==
The Saket District Centre is spread over 54 acres (220,000 m^{2}). It is planned that the district centre consists of 1,500,000 sq ft (140,000 m^{2}) of retail space boasting of top Indian and international brands, two multiplexes and a hotels. There are five functional malls: Select Citywalk, DLF Avenue (Formerly DLF Place), Metropolitan Mall, Southern Park, Rectangle One and Square 1 Mall.

== Shopping malls ==
=== MGF Metropolitan Mall ===
MGF Metropolitan Mall is a shopping mall in Saket District Centre. It was developed by the MGF Group and has a gross leasable area of 200,000 sq ft (19,000 m^{2}).

This mall has Shopper's Stop as anchor store along with many other retail outlets catering to the Indian Wedding Market – Sarees, Lehnengas, Ethnic India & Formal Western Wear, Fine Jewellery (6 stores), Accessories, Banquets, Restaurants & Bars, a Bose Store, Ishana Spa, Southend Honda, Imperial Jewels and many more.

=== Select Citywalk ===
Select Citywalk is a shopping mall located in Saket District Centre. It was developed by the Select Group and has a built-up area of 1,300,000 sq ft (120,000 m^{2}), with a retail space of 600,000 sq ft (56,000 m^{2}). It includes retail, a multiplex, serviced apartments, offices, and public spaces. It opened in October 2007. In December 2017 it opened Delhi's first Imax theatre.

=== Southern Park ===
Southern Park is a shopping mall cum commercial complex located in Saket District Centre, just behind the Select Citywalk mall. It was developed by the TDI Group with 200,000 sq ft (19,000 m^{2}). of contiguous office space spread over five floors plus two tiers of dedicated basement parking. It is home to India's largest private logistics company Gateway Rail Freight Ltd., the largest paper importer in India NTSC, and also the Chinese Visa Office. There are also numerous restaurants on the ground floor including the newly opened Carl's Jr.

=== DLF Avenue ===
DLF Avenue (Formerly DLF Place) is a fully operational shopping mall along with Select Citywalk in Saket District Centre. It has been developed by DLF Group and has a gross leasable area of 519,596 sq ft (48,272.0 m^{2}). The mall has Debenhams and Marks & Spencer anchor stores, a retail arcade with many major Indian and international brands of clothes and apparels, a six-screen DT cinemas multiplex & diner, a food court, Hard Rock Cafe, gourmet outlets, office complex and Hilton hotel.

=== The South Court ===
The South Court is a shopping mall developed by the DLF Group and has a total area of 400,000 sq ft (37,000 m^{2}). The mall has a retail arcade with many major Indian brands of clothes and apparel, a food court, gourmet outlets, office complex and a hotel.

== Hotels ==
- Hilton Garden Inn New Delhi
- Country Inn & Suites by Carlson
- Svelte Hotel & Personal Suites
