= AIIMS metro station =

Metro station in Delhi, India

AIIMS

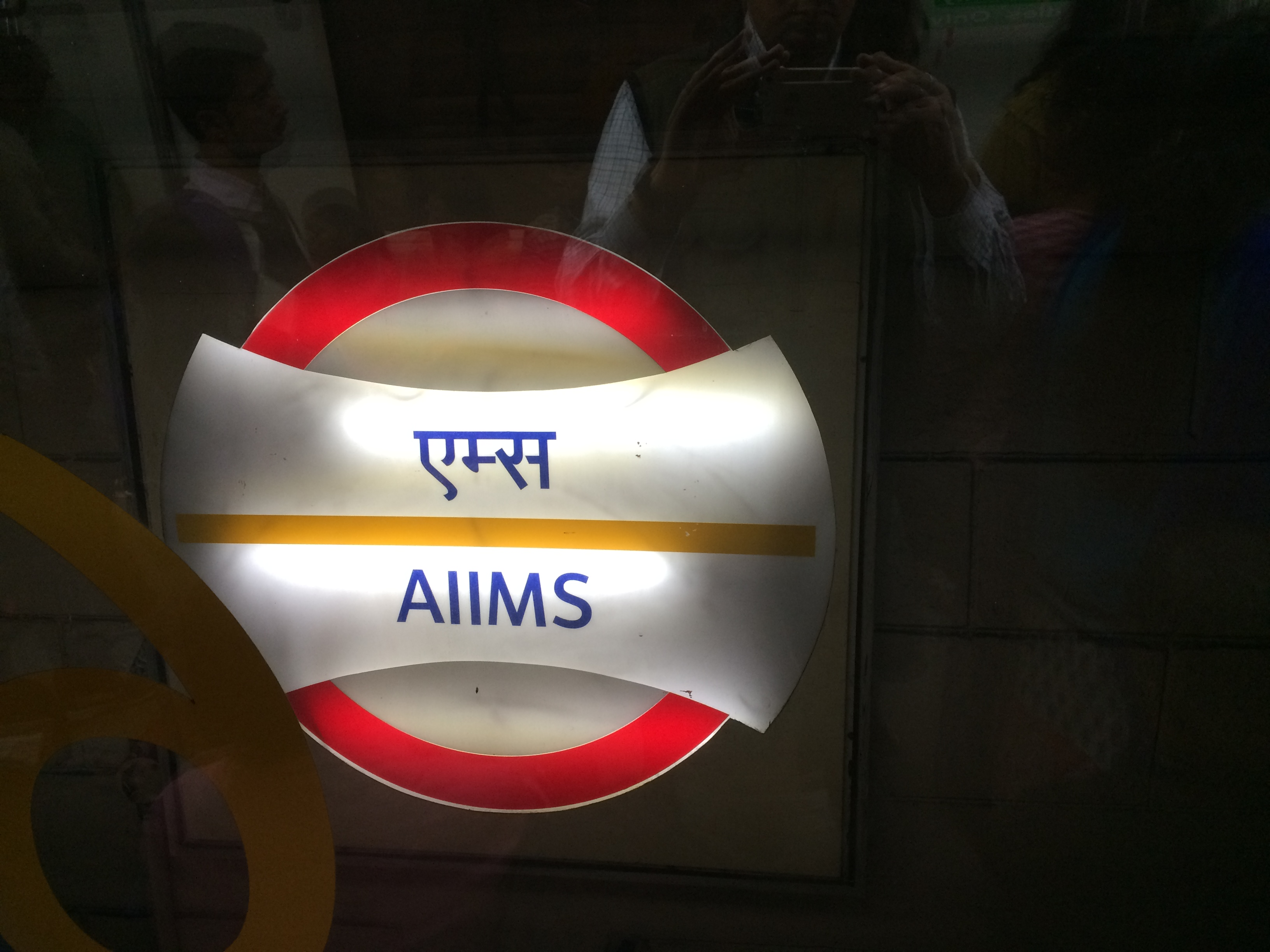

General information
- Location: Sri Aurobindo Marg, Ansari Nagar East, New Delhi, 110029
- Coordinates: 28°34′01″N 77°12′29″E
- System: Delhi Metro station
- Owner: Delhi Metro
- Operator: Delhi Metro Rail Corporation (DMRC)
- Line: Yellow Line
- Platforms: Island platform; Platform-1 → Millennium City Centre Gurugram; Platform-2 → Samaypur Badli
- Tracks: 2

Construction
- Structure type: Underground, Double-track
- Platform levels: 2
- Accessible: Yes

Other information
- Status: Staffed, Operational
- Station code: AIIMS

History
- Opened: 3 September 2010; 15 years ago
- Electrified: 25 kV 50 Hz AC through overhead catenary

Services
Preceding station	Delhi Metro	Following station
Dilli Haat - INA towards Samaypur Badli	Yellow Line	Green Park towards Millennium City Centre Gurugram
Route map
Location

The AIIMS metro station is located on the Yellow Line of the Delhi Metro.

The entrances are on Aurobindo Marg, the east side just outside the All India Institute of Medical Sciences. Safdarjung Hospital is just west of the station.

== The station ==
=== Station layout ===
G	Street Level	Exit/ Entrance
C	Concourse	Fare control, station agent, Ticket/token, shops
P	Platform 1 Southbound	Towards → Millennium City Centre Gurugram; Next Station: Green Park
P	Island platform | Doors will open on the right
P	Platform 2 Northbound	Towards ← Samaypur Badli; Next Station: Dilli Haat - INA Change at the next station for Pink Line

=== Facilities ===
List of available ATMs at AIIMS metro station: HDFC Bank, YES Bank, State Bank of India, IndusInd Bank

== Entry/exit ==
AIIMS metro station Entry/exits
Gate No-1	Gate No-2	Gate No-3	Gate No-4

== Connections ==
=== Bus ===
Delhi Transport Corporation bus routes number 335, 502, 503, 505, 507CL, 512, 516, 517, 519, 520, 536, 542, 548, 548CL, 548EXT, 605, 725, serve the station from the nearby AIIMS bus stop.

== See also ==
- New Delhi
- List of Delhi Metro stations
- Transport in Delhi
- Delhi Metro Rail Corporation
- Delhi Suburban Railway
- Delhi Transport Corporation
- Central Delhi
- AIIMS
- National Capital Region (India)
- Inner Ring Road, Delhi
- South Extension
- List of rapid transit systems
- List of metro systems
