= Gulmohar Park =

- Neighborhood
- Location in Delhi, India
- Coordinates: 28.559°N 77.212°E
- Country: India
- State: Delhi
- District: South Delhi

Languages
  - Official: Hindi
- Time zone: UTC+5:30 (IST)
- PIN: 110 049
- Planning agency: MCD

Gulmohar Park is an exclusive, upscale, lush green and secure gated neighbourhood in South Delhi. This park lies between Hauz Khas and Gautam Nagar and is named after the red-flowered Gulmohar trees (Delonix regia) growing inside. The nearby residential colony is known as Gulmohar Park Journalists' Colony or simply Gulmohar Park for short, and was established by a group of journalists in the 1970s and is today home to business people, senior lawyers and cine star Amitabh Bachchan's Delhi residence. The neighbourhood was once a part of the greater Shahpur Jat village.

Gulmohar Park is surrounded by Balbir Saxena Marg and Hauz Khas to the south, Yusuf Sarai, Gulmohar enclave and Gautam Nagar to the west, Neeti Bagh to the north and August Kranti Marg and Siri Fort to the east.

The colony covers 43 acres (170,000 m^{2}) and has 13 parks inside. It is divided into four blocks (A, B, C and D) and also contains a DDA market and a residents' club (Gulmohar Club). Inside the colony is a police post, part of the Defence Colony Police Station.

== Points of interest ==
Nearby landmarks include Siri Fort Auditorium, Siri Fort Sports Complex, All India Institute of Medical Sciences, National Institute of Fashion Technology, HUDCO Place and Yusuf Sarai Community Centre.

== Accessibility ==
Indira Gandhi International Airport (Terminal 1 – Domestic) is 12.9 km from Gulmohar Park. Indira Gandhi International Airport (Terminal 2 – International) is 19.87 km from Gulmohar Park. Hazrat Nizamuddin Railway Station is 9.98 km from Gulmohar Park

== See also ==
- List of parks in Delhi
