= Yusuf Sarai =

Place in South Delhi, India

Yusuf Sarai is a locality of South Delhi in India. Its origins date back to medieval India. Yusuf Sarai Market is a popular area for food and shopping. It is served by Green Park metro station and has a multi-level parking facility.

It lies on the Sri Aurobindo Marg close to AIIMS, New Delhi, and accommodates both residential as well as market places . It is named after historic Yusuf Sarai, one of many sarais (inns or rest houses) which were built in area during and Delhi Sultanate period, including, Katwaria Sarai, Lado Sarai, Sheikh Sarai and Kallu Sarai. Yusuf Sarai is also famous for mandir of maharaj shiv ji and mandir was built by Ch. Parbhu dayal & khubi ram jat Dhankhar in 1939-40.

== Location ==
The main road in this area is Sri Aurobindo Marg. It is on the stretch between AIIMS and Safdarjung Hospital on one end and Green Park Metro Station on the other. The stretch has shops on either side. On one side, it leads to Mandir wali Gali, a flea market and on the other side, a road leads to Niti Park. The area is termed as an urban village.

Yusuf Sarai has been famous for its guest houses since 1908, one can find cheap accomodations and some pocket-friendly local Dhabas to eat.

== Transport ==
The nearest station of Delhi Metro is Green Park on Yellow Line. Delhi Transport Corporation (DTC) Buses also available here for some of local places in Delhi.

== Adjoining areas ==
- Ansari Nagar
- Gautam nagar
- Green Park extn.
- Gulmohar enclave
- Gulmohar Park
- Hauz Khas
