= Katwaria Sarai =

Neighbourhood of New Delhi, India

Coordinates: 28°33′N 77°11′E

Katwaria Sarai is a small neighborhood in the south of New Delhi. It is one of the three villages, along with Ber Sarai and Jia Sarai, bordering the Indian Institute of Technology (IIT).
