= Nexus Select Citywalk =

Coordinates: 28°31′44.48″N 77°13′8.88″E

Nexus Select CITYWALK
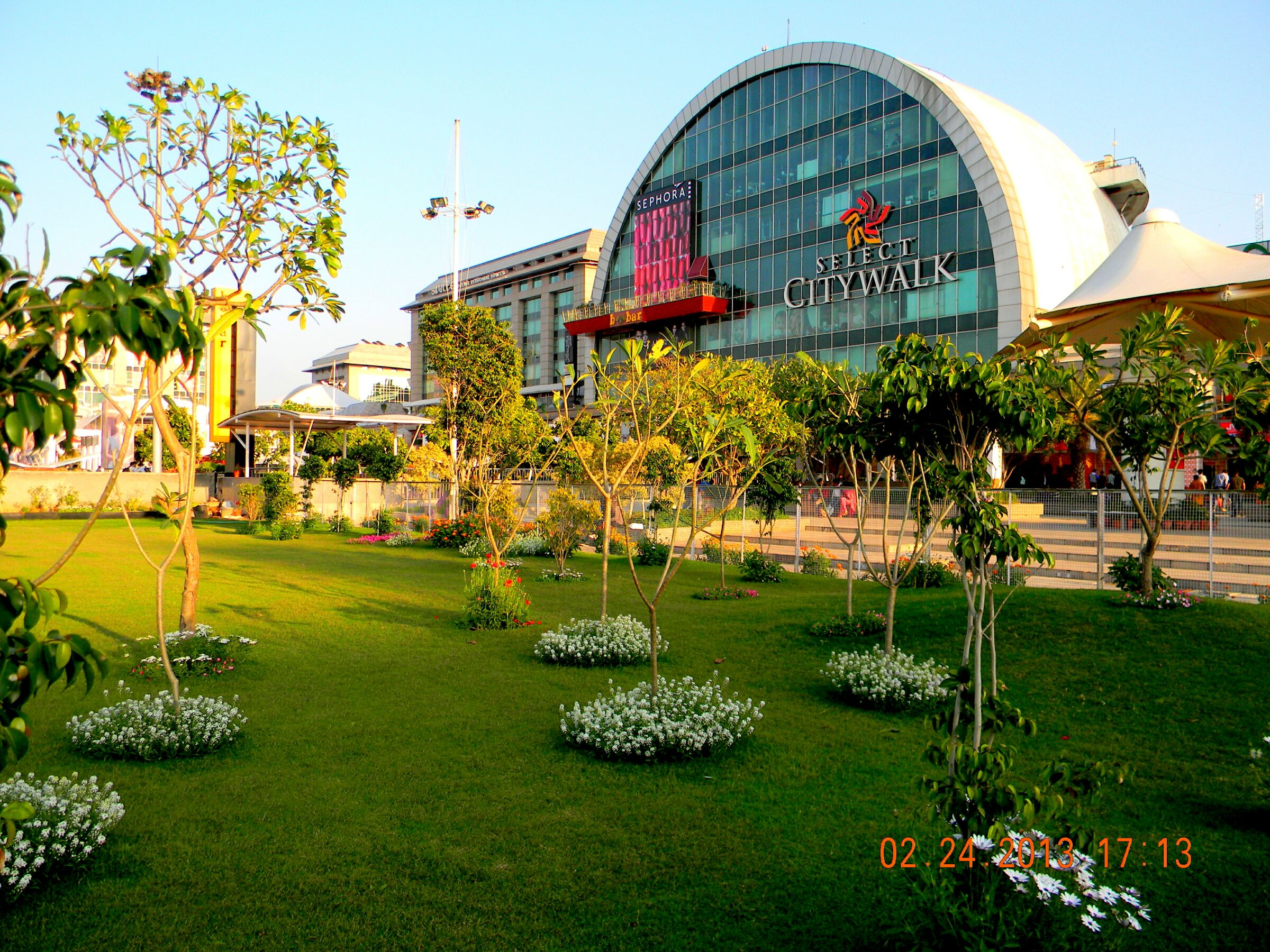
- Select CITYWALK
- Location: Saket District Centre, Pushp Vihar, Delhi
- Opened: 12 October 2007
- Developer: Select Infrastructure Pvt. Ltd, a joint venture between the Select group and the Aarone Group
- Num. of stores: 170
- Num. of anchor tenants: 8
- Floor area: 500,000 sq ft (46,000 m^{2})
- Floors: 3
- Parking: 12 CFR00
- Website: Select City Walk

Nexus Select CITYWALK is a shopping centre located in the Saket District Centre Sector-6, Pushp Vihar, Delhi.

== Location ==
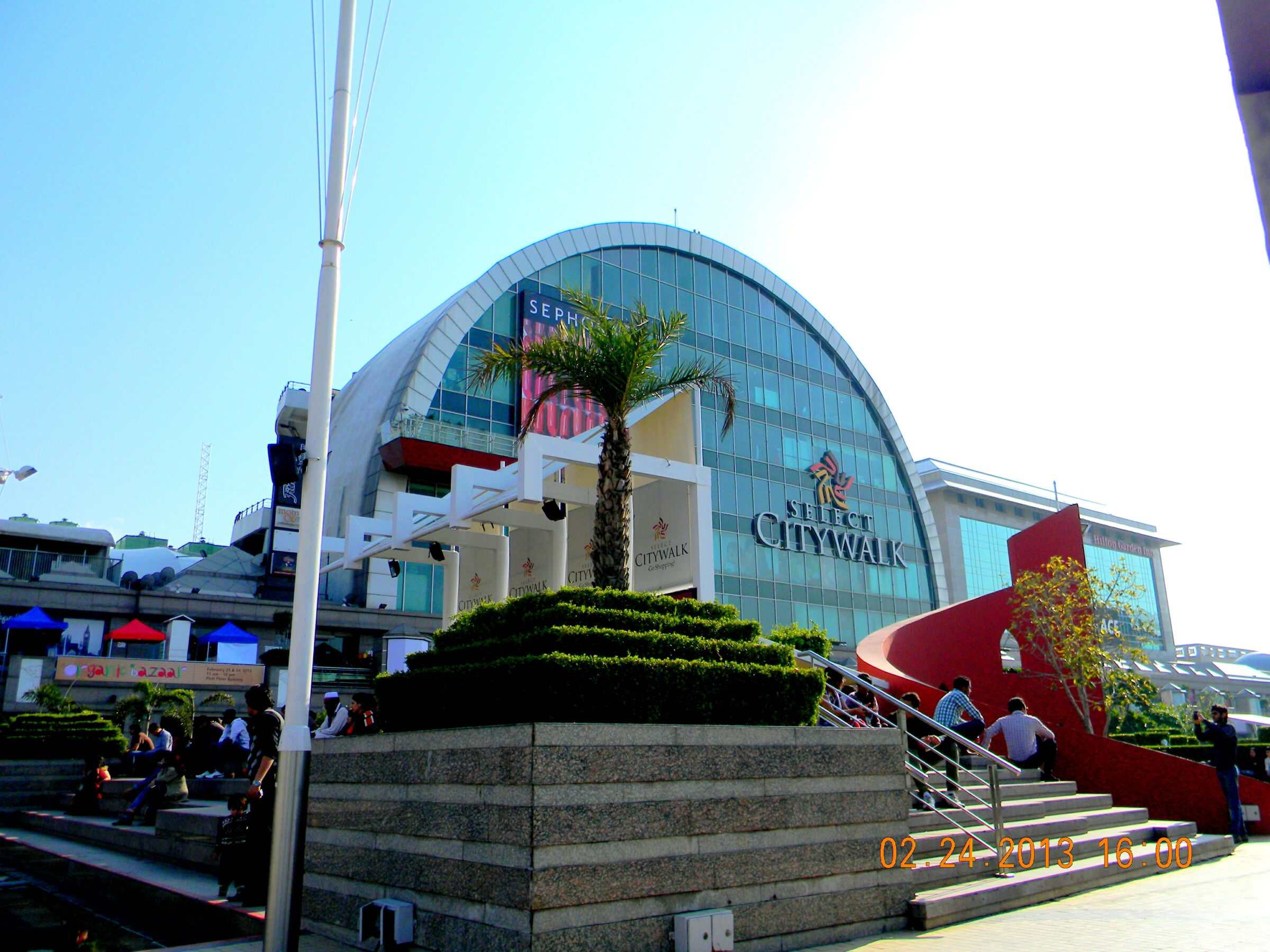

The mall is spread over 6 acres (24,000 m^{2}) and includes a 4 km long multiplex, serviced apartments, offices and public spaces. The mall was developed by Select Infrastructure, a joint venture between the Select group and the Aarone Group. It was opened to the public in October 2007. The mall has a built-up area of 1,300,000 sq ft (120,000 m^{2}), with 600,000 sq ft (56,000 m^{2}) of retail space.

== Features ==
The Shopping Center has a 10,000 sq ft (930 m^{2}). multi-cuisine food court my square. It also has a number of speciality fine dining restaurants. The mall also houses PVR Cinemas multiplex, which comprises six screens including 2 gold classes and has a total seating capacity of 1,235. In December 2017 it opened Delhi's first IMAX theatre.
