= Samalkha (Delhi) =

- Village
- Samalka
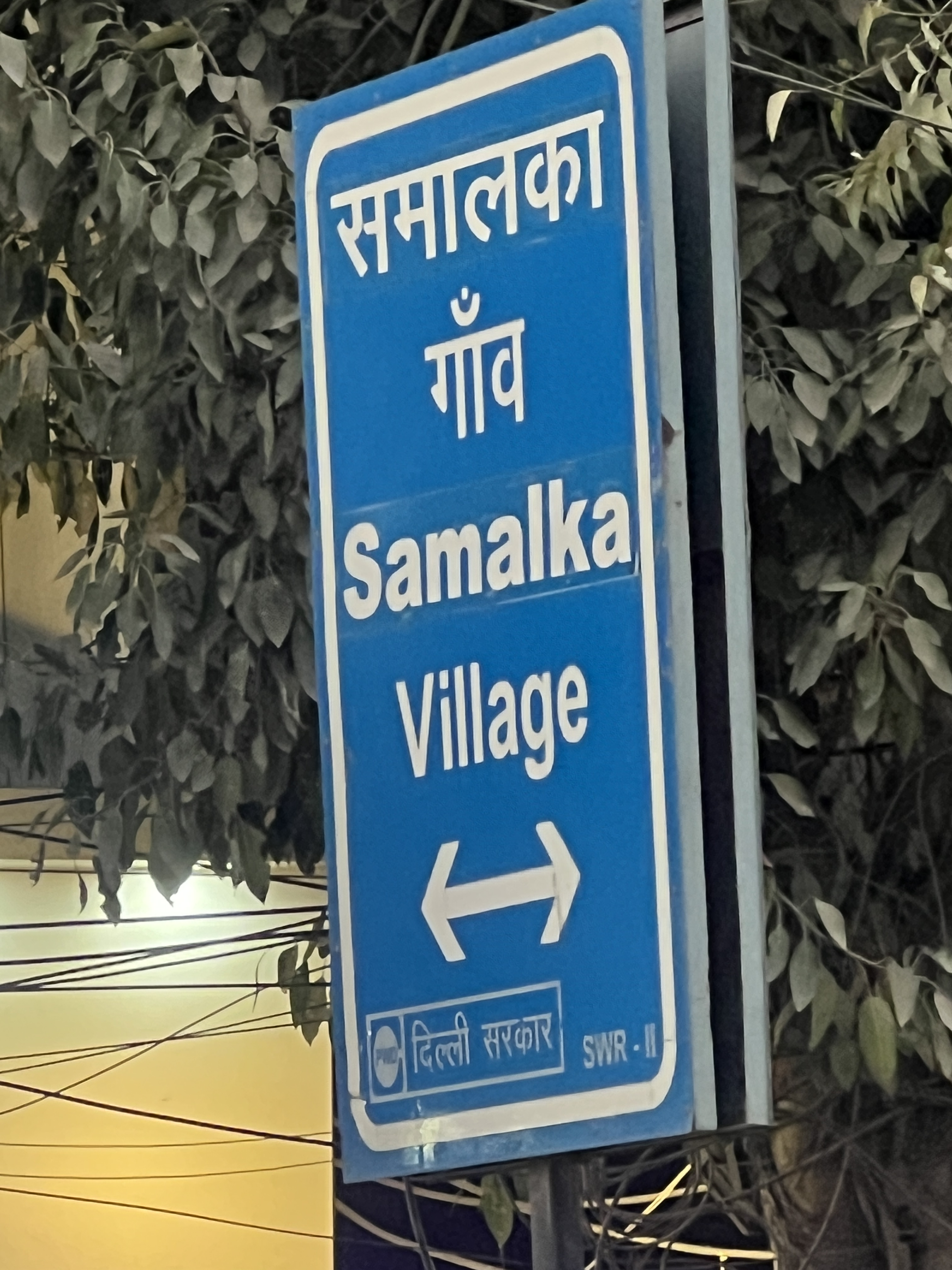
- Country: India
- State: Delhi
- District: South West Delhi
- Tehsil: Vasant Vihar
- PIN code: 110037

Samalkha is a village located in South-West Delhi, India. It lies about 12 miles south-west of Delhi city on the Delhi-Gurgaon Road and is close to the Haryana border.

The village falls under the jurisdiction of Mehrauli Police Station and is part of a Community Development Block with its headquarters at Najafgarh.

Samalkha is one of the fifteen historically recognised Gaur Brahmin villages of Delhi.

== Geography and land use ==
Samalkha covers 736 acres, with 616 acres under cultivation. The land consists of both sandy (bangar) and stony (pahari) soil. The village has a hot climate in summers and is cold during winters.

== Population ==
In the 1961 census, the village had a population of 621 people in 92 households. The majority were Gaur Brahmin, making up about 75% of the population. Other communities include Julahas (weavers), Bairagis, Baniyas, Ahirs, Nais, and Kumhars.
