= Bhai Trilochan Singh Panesar =

Social worker in India

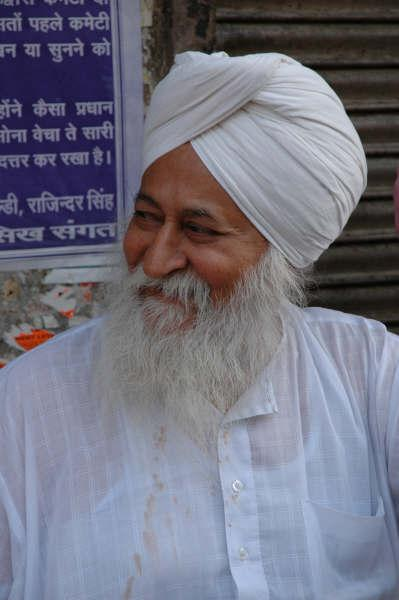
Picture of Bhai Trilochan Singh Panesar also known as Veerji.

Bhai Trilochan Singh Panesar also known as Veerji (18 November 1937 – 19 March 2010) was a social worker in India. He is famously known as Jhaaroo (broom) Wale Veerji as he made it his mission to clean all the major historical Gurdwaras in Delhi. He organised his team of volunteers to prepare food the whole day and feed thousands of people through Langar (community kitchen) every morning, in front of Gurudwara Sis Ganj Sahib, Chandni Chowk, Delhi.

Veerji was born in Mandalay, Burma on 18 November 1937. His father Sadhoo Singh served in the British Indian Army during World War II and later in the Indian Railways. Singh retired as a technical officer with the Indian Agricultural Research Institute, Pusa, New Delhi. He died on 19 March 2010. His wife was Sardarni Dalip Kaur. She died on 5 March 2008. The couple had two sons, Premjit Singh Panesar and Kamaljeet Singh, who are now continuing the mission started by their parents. Veerji was deeply influenced by the teachings of Sikh Gurus, Bhai Kanhaiya, and Mother Teresa.

== Works ==
Noted columnist Khushwant Singh wrote a column in The Tribune in September 2002 appreciating his work with the article "No One Will Go Hungry" () after seeing his volunteers distribute food to pilgrims in Sach Khand Express train. He discouraged people from drawing commercial benefit from sale of Sikh religious texts and instead distributed them free of cost. He campaigned for a vegetarian diet. He organized camps for the inmates of Tihar Jail, New Delhi, and many jails in states such as Bihar and Madhya Pradesh in which free eye check-up and distribution of spectacles, scanning and treatment for tuberculosis, and distribution of clothes for inmates was organized. He and his teams cremate unclaimed dead bodies in various mortuaries around the city with the help of Department of Police, Delhi. He has immunized several of people for Hepatitis B. He, in various capacities, constructed and repaired a number of crematoriums. He hired land to grow crops from which grain could be used for feeding the poor.

== Construction works ==
Veerji helped in the construction of many temples. He contributed in construction of Gurudwara Moti Bagh and the pond at Bangla Sahib. He got many tube wells dug in the city to provide water for drinking and cleaning. He started Virdhashram, a hospital where patients who need continued care are admitted. The last project he started was the construction of a multi-storeyed bath room block building in the Gurudwara Bangla Sahib near Cannaught Place, New Delhi. His team is currently constructing a multi-utility building at Gurudwara Bala Sahib in Delhi. The Langar Hall has been completed and a living accommodation for pilgrims and travellers is being completed.

== Emergency services ==
He constructed a 200-bed hospital in Limbdi, Gujarat as a part of 2001 Gujarat earthquake relief works. He also worked to provide relief during events such as 2004 Indian Ocean earthquake and tsunami, bomb blasts at Sarojini Nagar, New Delhi, Bihar floods in September 2008. His team contributed in relief work for the 2014 floods in Kashmir.

== Early life ==
Veerji was born in Mandalay in Myanmar; it is said that in 1942 some of his family members were killed during the Japanese bombing. He was a five-year-old child, was picked up by his elder sister and brought to Punjab. His father who was then serving in Army, discovered that his children were alive much later. He studied in a village madrassa initially and in a school. He joined Engineering College at Nilokheri, Haryana, where he earned his diploma in civil engineering. Veerji joined PWD Punjab, and was involved in survey work in Rohtang Pass. He came on deputation to New Delhi for construction of IIT Delhi. He left IIT in 1971, and joined IARI Pusa.

== Highlighting Sikhism ==
Veerji encouraged marriages without dowry. He organized many marriages, and advised the couples to avoid expenditure. He opposed abortion and urged people instead to give such children to him, so that he could care for orphans. He helped many orphans by settling them in good families. Veerji discouraged ritualism, and orthodox behaviour.

== His Philosophy ==
"Life is short, make the best use of it. Realize that service (sewa) and prayer (simran) are the only two bedrocks of life. Without mercy in the heart even a saint becomes a monster. To achieve anything one has to first give up slumber, rest and one has to undergo pain. Giving is no giving till it pains to give. Serving is no serving till it pains to serve. When there is opposition, and hurt, the service is accepted by Almighty. Seek no publicity, work alone without politics, there are many who will value your work. If you are running after fame and respect, God is never happy. Serve the needy in silence. Nature rewards the humble. Serve the needy. Compassion is the most important quality in a person, the start point of religion. Without compassion, all is futile. Remembering God always, and making small prayers (Ardaas) before each work gets success. Building temples and places of worship is good, but real good thing is to serve humanity, and nature. Realize that each breath we take takes us closer to our end, do not waste time in petty affairs. Work with own hands, humbly. Share and consume, and do not eat meat. Your food itself should be pure, do not consume intoxicants. Do not use drugs, or tobacco. Suffering bad words, without reacting is real tapasya (strenuous worship). God loves us, and looks after us, he is always close to us, and cares for us. When you are serving the needy, you are serving God. Service in which there is no pain involved is no service, giving is no giving till it pains to give. If you face opposition in your works, consider it as certain that success is near and you are about to be blessed. Shun the company of publicity seekers, they do work for fame and will barter your works for personal selfish motives. If you get into worry, feed the birds, worry disappears from under the roof of the house on which birds feed. If you have less money and cannot feed the birds, feed the ants, as they will be satisfied with just a few grams of sugar and flour (chini te atta). It is the number of souls which are satisfied by you which will matter. If you are in a great problem, and cannot get any results, go to a butchery, buy a pregnant cow, or an animal about to be butchered. Get that animal released, care for it, and you will be blessed. Release fish which is about to be eaten, into flowing water/ponds. Give water to the thirsty. Clothes to those who have none. Bandage the injured and those who cannot afford it. Sweep the floors of prayer houses, keep them clean. One who pays daily respects to a Master is loved by his master. Salute God daily, in each breath you take. Remembrance is being with Him. Have a contract with God: I will do your works, You do mine."

== Current works ==
Veerji is considered as a saint by many. Projects started by him continue up to date. People who respect the way shown by him for humanitarian services continue to contribute their energies in the mission started by him. His mission seeks no donations in cash.
