= Green Park, Delhi =

Green Park
- Neighborhood of Delhi
- Location in Delhi, India
- Coordinates: 28°33′N 77°12′E
- Country: India
- State: Delhi
- District: South Delhi
- Established: 1960s

Languages
  - Official: Hindi
- Time zone: UTC+5:30 (IST)
- PIN: 110016
- Planning agency: South Delhi Municipal Corporation

Green Park is an upscale affluent residential neighbourhood in the South Delhi district of Delhi, India. The locality is divided into two parts i.e. Main and Extension. The neighbourhood registered a 4.4% growth in residential sales and was featured alongside Greater Kailash, Defence Colony, Vasant Vihar and Anand Niketan in the 2019 edition of Knight Frank's quarterly report on prime luxury residential properties in various megacities around the globe. Property rates have always been high in this colony due to the numerous facilities available. Builder floors and independent villas cost anywhere between INR 6–70 crores (the US $800,000 – $9,000,000) in this colony. Rental rates are also very high making this residential area among the most expensive pin codes of New Delhi.

== History ==
It was established in the early 1960s and today has all the amenities of a rich cosmopolitan culture along with large residential and commercial areas and many religious places. Green Park is considered by some as the "lungs" of Delhi, as it is near one of the largest green areas in the city like Deer park, Lodhi Garden and Rose Garden. It is also believed to be an upscale residential area with real estate prices soaring as high as ₹100 crore (US $14.5 million). It is part of the New Delhi (Lok Sabha constituency), and its current electorate member is Bansuri Swaraj of BJP

It is divided into two parts: Green Park Main and Green Park Extension. The Main hosts a medium-sized market with several restaurants and a shopping complex. The Extension mostly consists of residential areas. It has a number of open and wooded spaces in its vicinity – Deer Park, District Park and Rose Garden. These are very popular areas with morning walkers and laughter clubs.

The Uphaar Cinema fire, one of the worst fire tragedies in recent Indian history, occurred on Friday, 13 June 1997 at Uphaar Cinema, near Green Park Extension Block A, Delhi, during the premiere screening of Border, a Hindi movie. 59 people died and 103 were seriously injured in the subsequent stampede; most of the victims were trapped on the balcony and were asphyxiated as they tried to reach dimly marked exits to escape the smoke and fire, and found the doors locked.

The fire broke out at 5:10 pm, after the transformer at the parking level burst, and 20 cars in the parking lot caught fire, eventually leading to a large scale fire in the five-storey building which housed the cinema hall and several offices. The cinema hall was situated in one of the busiest areas of South Delhi and the fire services were delayed owing to the heavy evening traffic. At least 48 fire tenders were pressed into service at 5.20 p.m. and it took them over an hour to put out the fire. Later the dead and the injured were rushed to the nearby All India Institute of Medical Sciences (AIIMS) and Safdarjung Hospital, where scenes of chaos and pandemonium followed, as relatives and family members of the victims scurried around to look for known faces.

The victims of the tragedy and the families of the deceased later formed 'The Association of Victims of Uphaar Fire Tragedy' (AVUT), which filed the landmark Civil compensation case and won Rs 25 crore (Rs 250 million) in civil compensation for the relatives and families of victims, the judgment is now considered a breakthrough in Compensation Law in India; today they meet at every anniversary at 'Smriti Upavan' memorial, outside the hall, where a prayer meeting is held. However the Supreme Court on 13/10/2011 nearly halved the sum of compensation awarded to them by the Delhi high court and slashed punitive damages to be paid by cinema owners Ansal brothers from Rs 2.5 crore to Rs 25 lakh.

== Geography ==
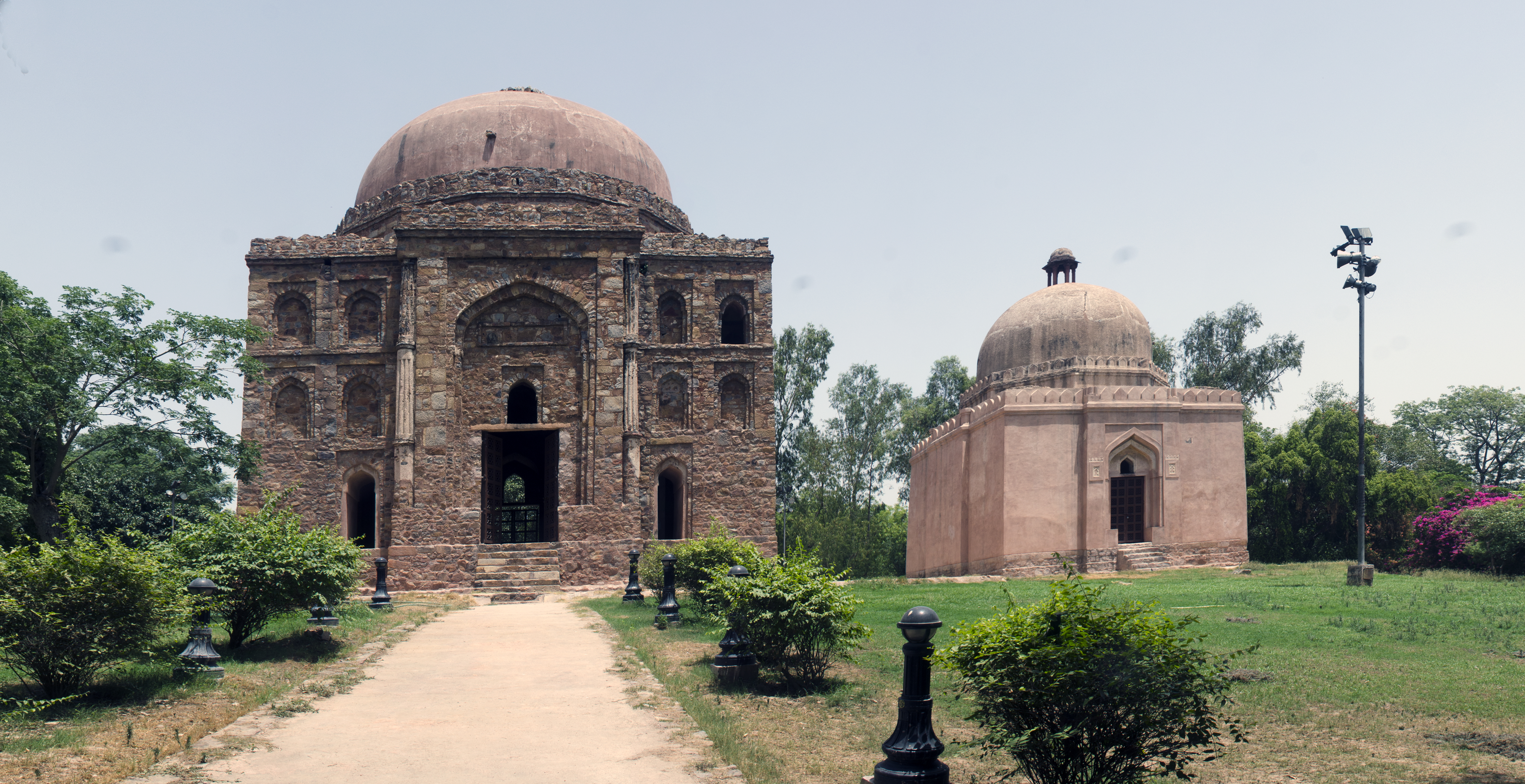
Dadi Poti ka Gumbad

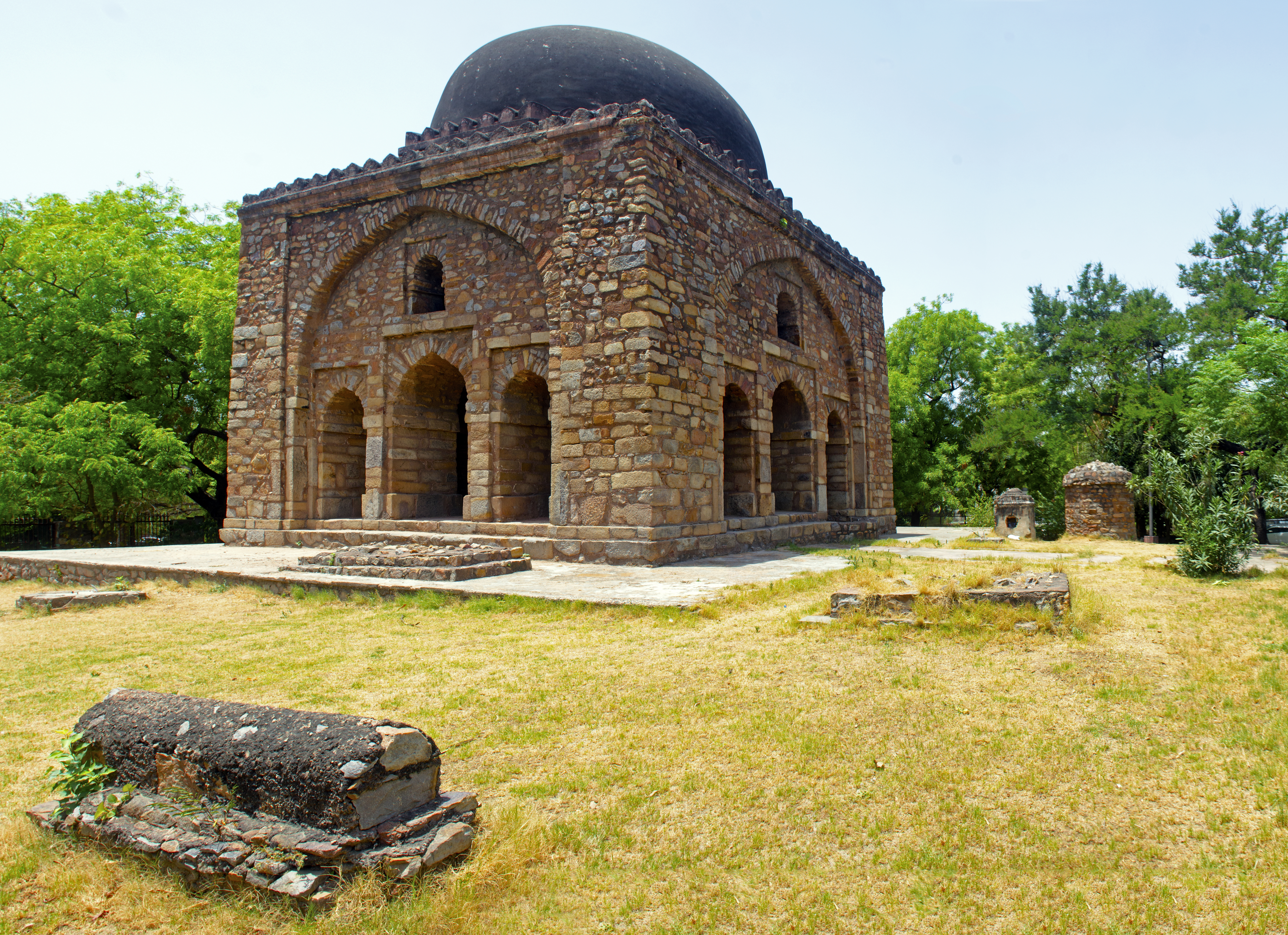
Barakhamba

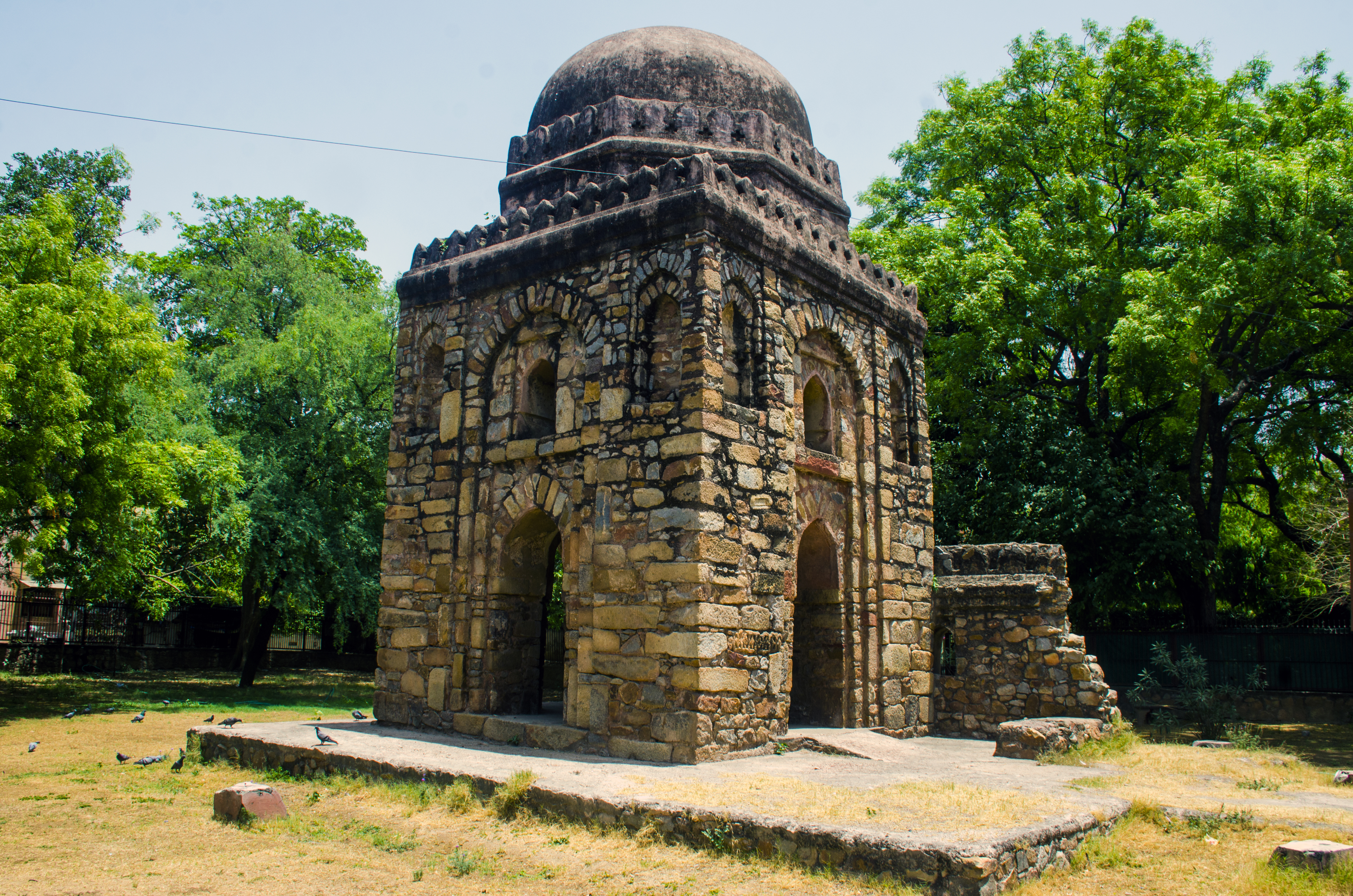
Sakri Gumti

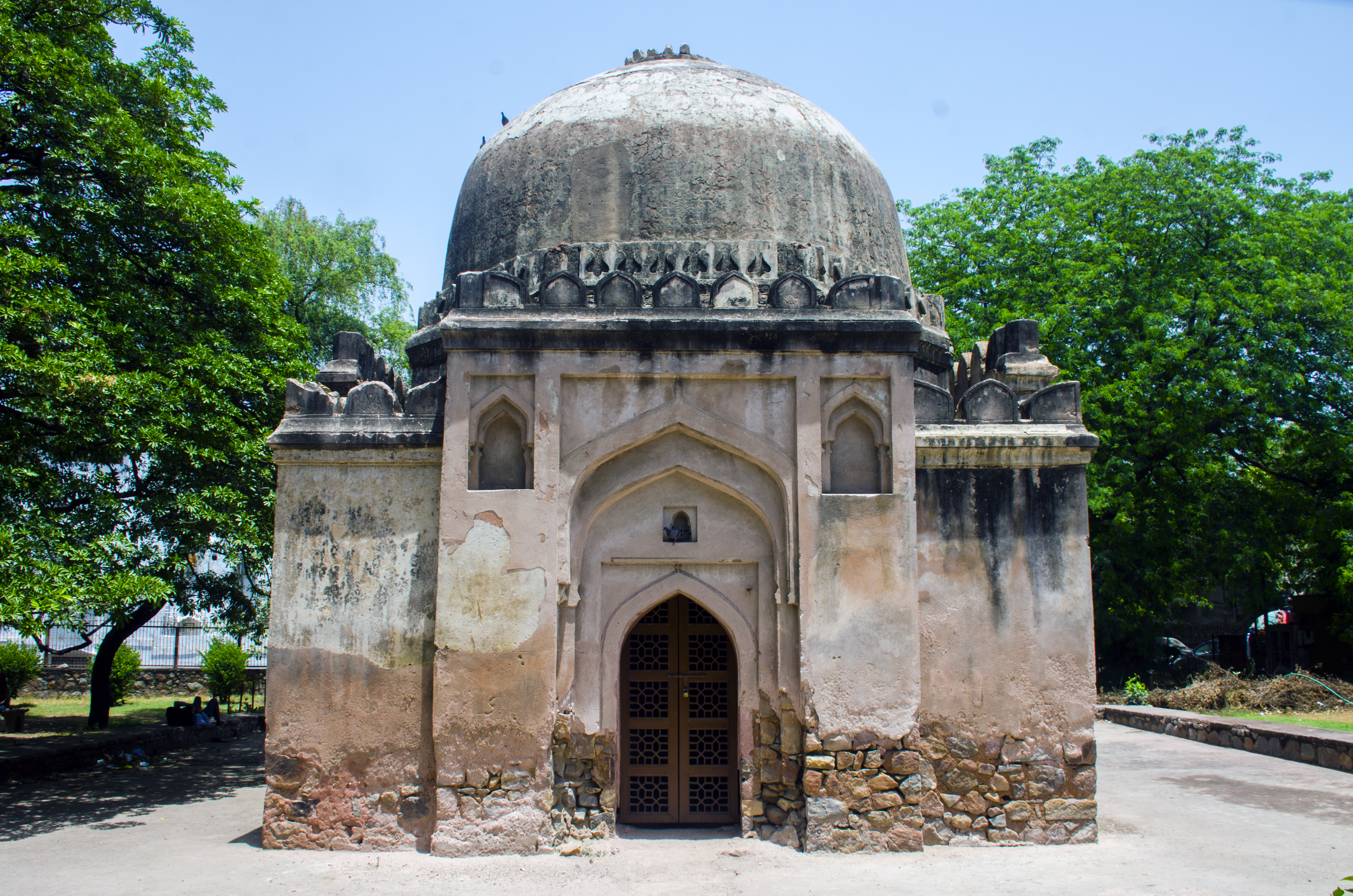
Chooti Gumti

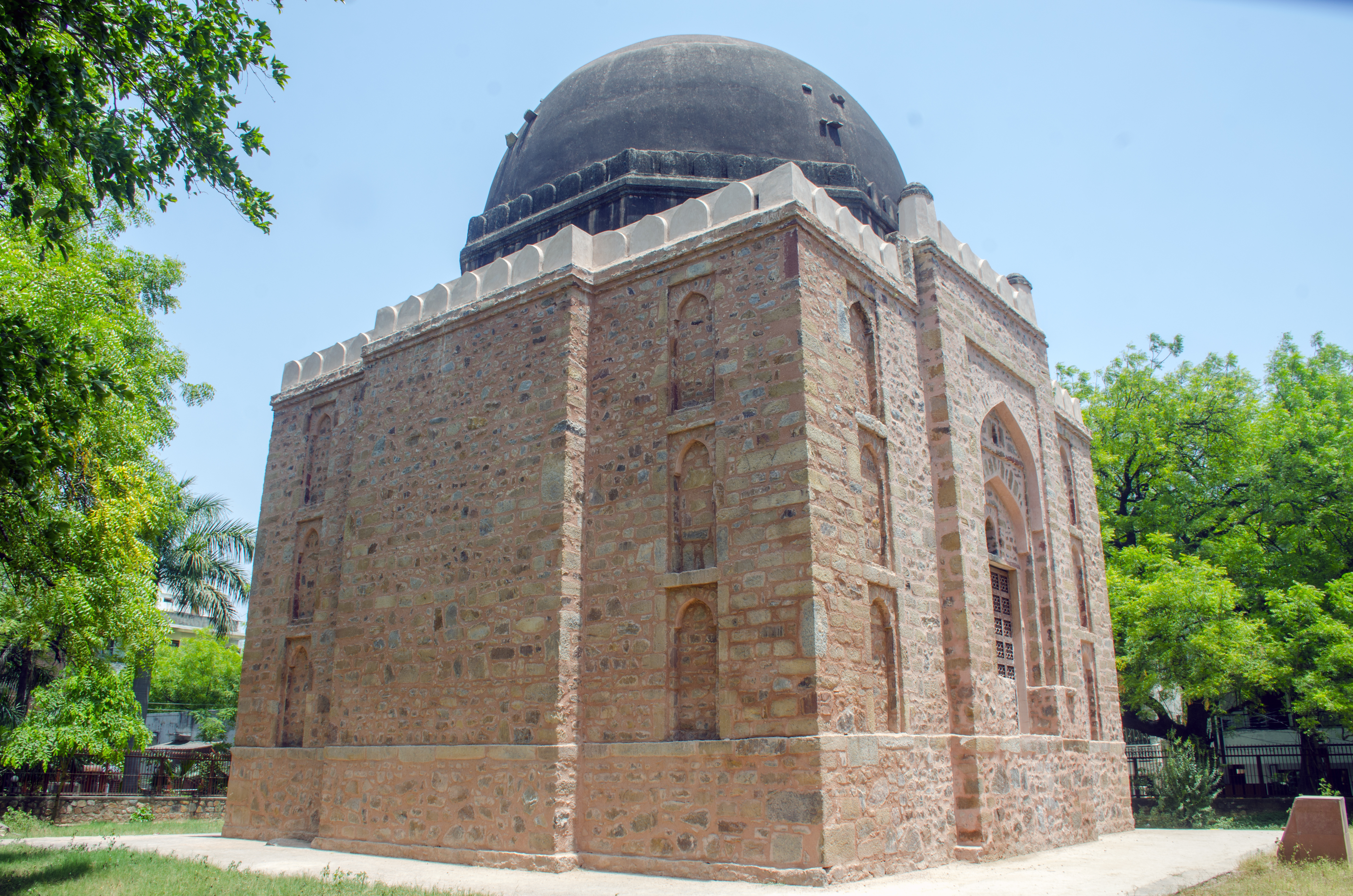
Biran ka Gumbad

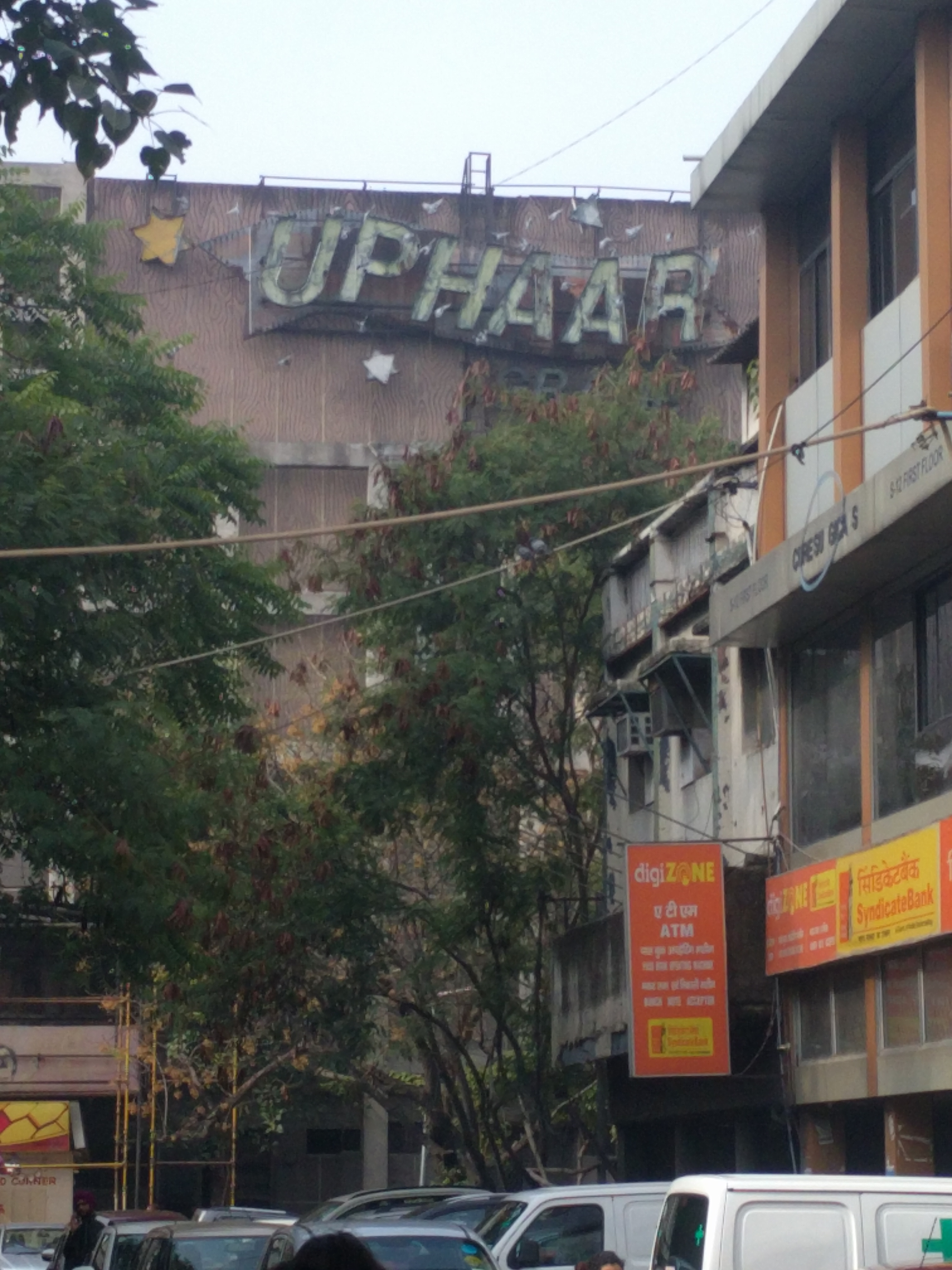
Uphar Cinema Building

It is bounded on the 4 sides by major avenues: Inner Ring Road, Outer Ring Road, Aurobindo Marg and Africa Avenue. Hauz Khas, Safdarjung Enclave, SDA are adjoining colonies and 2 major hospitals, AIIMS and Safdarjung Hospital touch its boundaries.

== Historical places ==
The adjoining areas of Green Park are Hauz Khas, of great historical significance with numerous monuments dating back to the medieval period of the Delhi Sultanate, and the Deer Park, which is a large public space with greenery and also the DLTA Tennis courts. and Uphaar Cinema is in Green Park. Apart from Hauz Khas Green Park also has five national protected monuments under Archaeological Survey of India (ASI).

- Dadi Poti ki Gumbad: Literally meaning the tomb of grandmother and granddaughter.
- Barakhamba: Bara Khamba, literally means twelve pillars. It is a domed structure supported by 12 pillars. There are a few other scattered structures in the compound.
- Sakri Gumti: Green Park (Near Khareha Village, From Green Park metro station about one km south. 200 m east of Jagannath Temple). Timings: Sunrise – Sunset. Tombs belonging to the Lodi age. Tombs dating back to 15th and 16th centuries.
- Chhoti Gumti: Literally meaning the small tomb.
- Biran ka Gumbad: Literally meaning "tomb of the brother", the mausoleum has arched niches which are neatly arranged. It was built during the Lodi rule.

== Market ==
Green Park market includes various high end salon, spas and restaurants of various cuisines, ranging from pizzas, kebabs to South Indian delights. Green park is also situated near by Hauz Khas Village, Shahpur Jat and defence colony which are famous for their nightlife.

- Nik Baker's
- Pizza Hut
- Domino's
- Starbucks
- Café Coffee Day
- Evergreen Sweet House
- Haldiram's
- L'Opéra
- Sardar-Ji-Bakhsh Coffee & Co.
- Café Turquoise Cottage
- Molecule Air Bar
- Raasta
- 24Seven – 24 hour convenience store
- Summer House Cafe
- Auro Kitchen & Bar
- Mango Kitchen & Bar
- Moonshine 2.0

== Religious places ==
Several mandirs, church and a mosque are situated in the locality.

- Jagannath Temple
- Iyappa Temple
- Balaji Temple (backside of GP, R K Puram)
- Shri Parashnath Digambar Jain Mandir (Green Park Extension)
- Shri Sanatan Dharm Mandir
- Green Park Gurudwara
- Green Park Free Church
- Green Park Masjid (situated in the southern part, on Nightingale Lane.)

== Transportation ==
The Green Park area is served by the Green Park metro station of the Delhi Metro.

- Indira Gandhi International Airport (Terminal 3 – International) is 16 km
- Indira Gandhi International Airport (Terminal 1 – Domestic) is 11 km
- Hazrat Nizamuddin Railway Station is 9 km
- New Delhi Railway Station is 11 km
- ISBT Kashmiri Gate is 16 km
- Sarai Kale Khan is 10 km

== Hospitals and Medical Facility ==
There are several dental and small clinics located in the vicinity along with 2 major hospitals

- All India Institute of Medical Sciences, New Delhi
- Safdarjung Hospital
- Adiva Hospital
- Sukhmani Hospital
- Purete Dental
- Green Park Dental Clinic
- Clove Dental

== Gallery ==
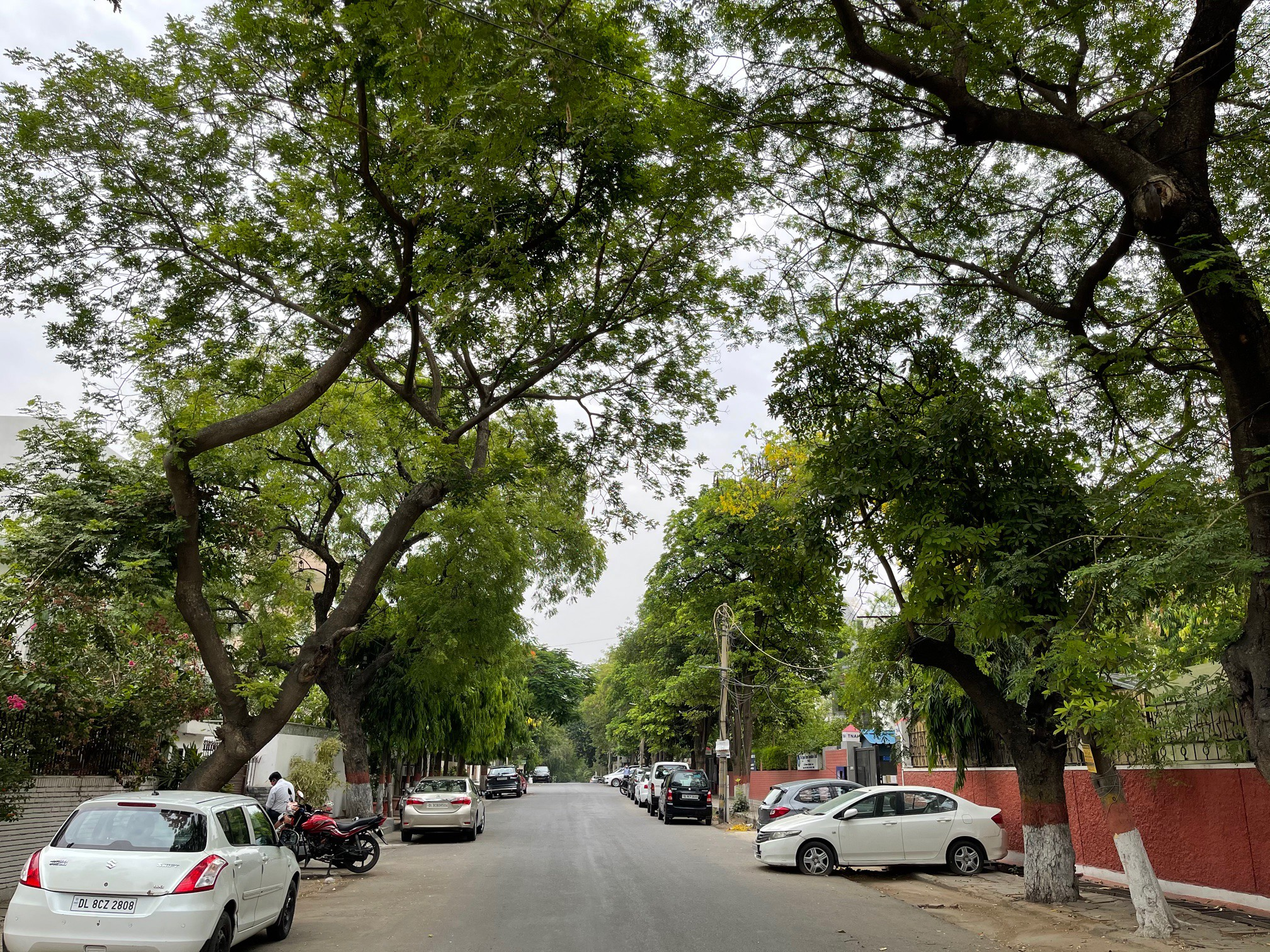

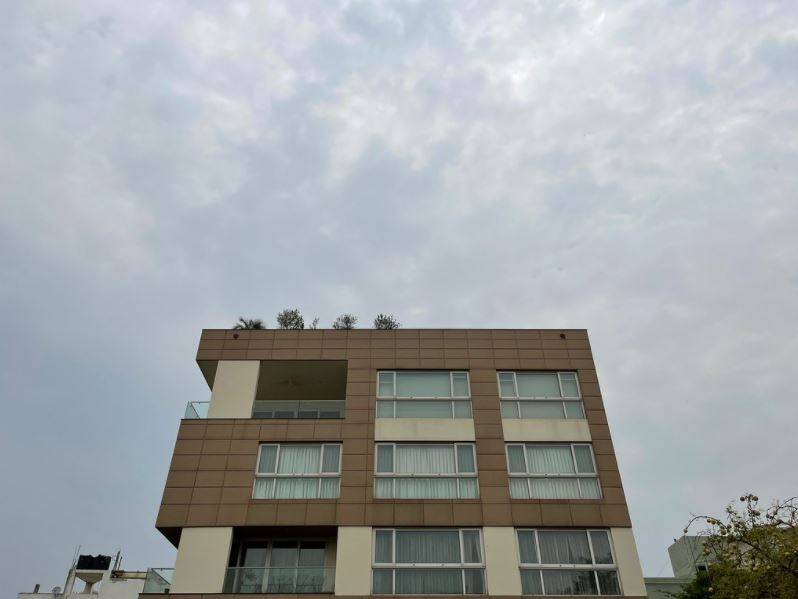

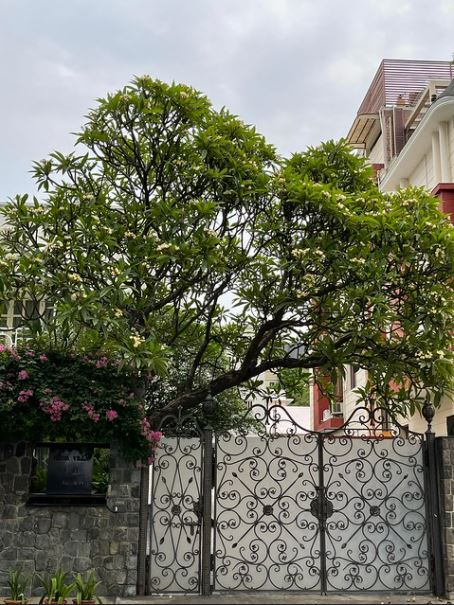

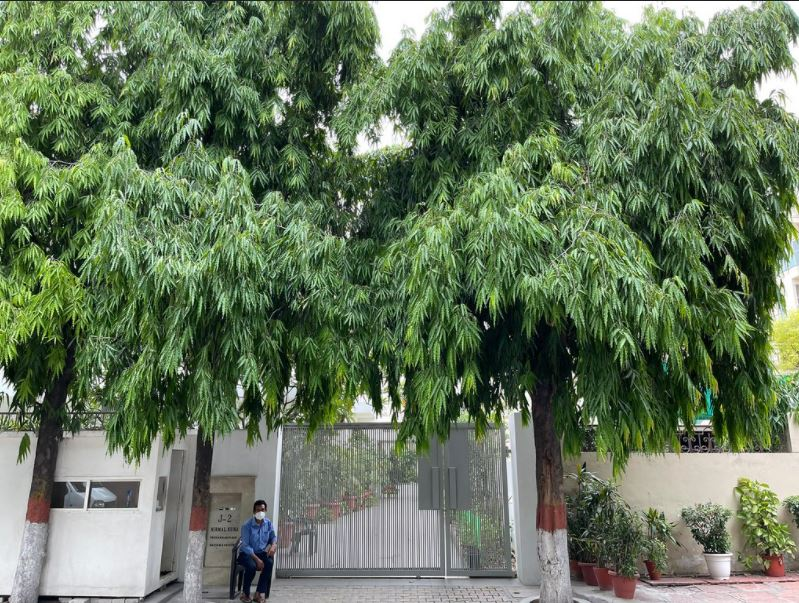

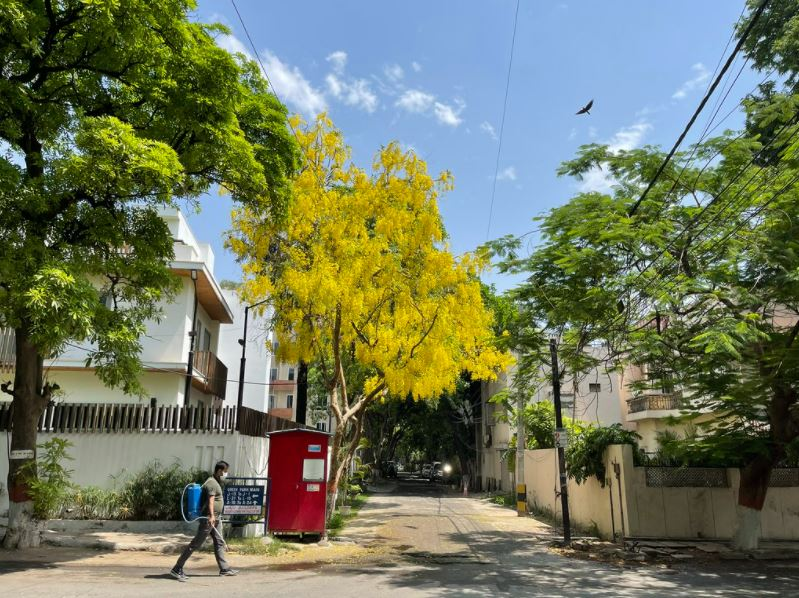

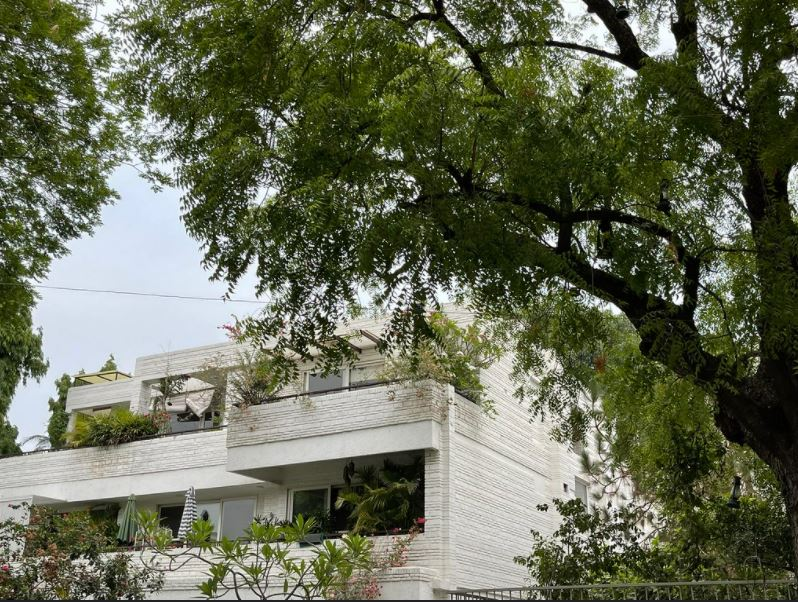

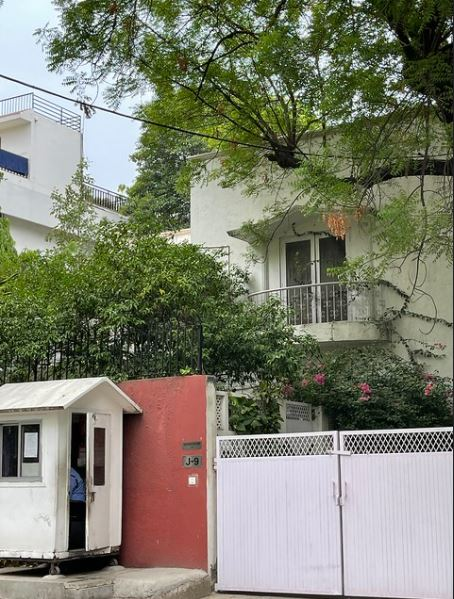
