= Green Park metro station =

Metro station in Delhi, India

Green Park

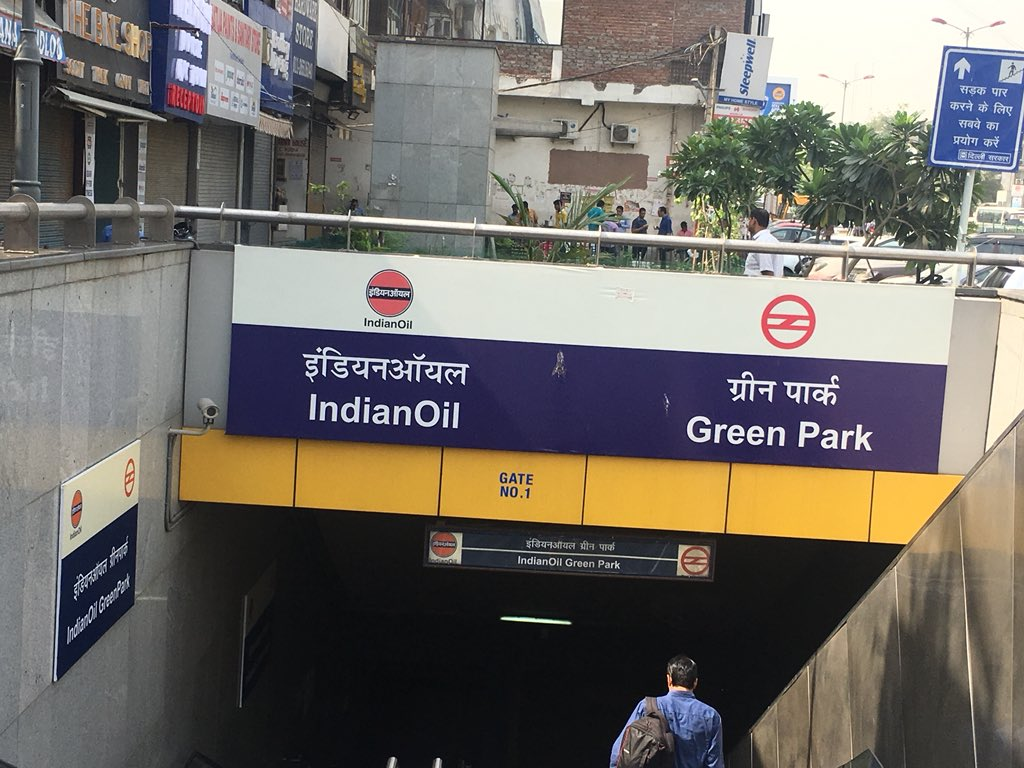

General information
- Location: Green Park, New Delhi, 110016
- Coordinates: 28°33′29″N 77°12′25″E
- System: Delhi Metro station
- Owner: Delhi Metro
- Operator: Delhi Metro Rail Corporation (DMRC)
- Line: Yellow Line
- Platforms: Island platform; Platform-1 → Millennium City Centre Gurugram; Platform-2 → Samaypur Badli
- Tracks: 2

Construction
- Structure type: Underground, Double-track
- Platform levels: 2
- Parking: Available
- Accessible: Yes

Other information
- Status: Staffed, Operational
- Station code: GNPK

History
- Opened: 3 September 2010; 15 years ago
- Electrified: 25 kV 50 Hz AC through overhead catenary

Services
Preceding station	Delhi Metro	Following station
AIIMS towards Samaypur Badli	Yellow Line	Hauz Khas towards Millennium City Centre Gurugram
Route map
Location

The Green Park metro station is located on the Yellow Line of the Delhi Metro below Aurobindo Marg.

It serves Green Park Main, Yusuf Sarai Market and Green Park Extension. It is also a short walk from Aurobindo Place, located on the same road just south of the station. Places like Green Park Market, Gulmohar Park, Gautam Nagar have access from this metro station only. Restaurants like A2B, Evergreen and the famous National Institute of Fashion Technology can be reached by walk from this metro station.

== Station layout ==
G	Street Level	Exit/ Entrance
C	Concourse	Fare control, station agent, Ticket/token, shops
P	Platform 1 Southbound	Towards → Millennium City Centre Gurugram; Next Station: Hauz Khas Change at the next station for Magenta Line
P	Island platform | Doors will open on the right
P	Platform 2 Northbound	Towards ← Samaypur Badli; Next Station: AIIMS

== Entry/exit ==
Green Park station Entry/exits
Gate No-1	Gate No-2	Gate No-3	Gate No-4
Yusuf Sarai Market	Siri Fort auditorium, National Institute of Fashion Technology	Uphaar Cinema	Gurudwara Sikh Sangat, Green Park

== Connections ==
=== Bus ===
Delhi Transport Corporation bus routes number 502, 503, 505, 507CL, 516, 517, 519, 548CL, 605, serves the station from nearby Green Park bus stop.

== See also ==
- New Delhi
- Green Park, Delhi
- List of Delhi Metro stations
- Transport in Delhi
- Delhi Metro Rail Corporation
- Delhi Suburban Railway
- Delhi Transport Corporation
- Central Delhi
- National Capital Region (India)
- List of rapid transit systems
- List of metro systems
