= Ber Sarai =

- Neighborhood of Delhi
- Location in Delhi, India
- Coordinates: 28.550223°N 77.18191°E
- Country: India
- State: Delhi
- District: South West Delhi

Languages
  - Official: Hindi
- Time zone: UTC+5:30 (IST)
- PIN: 110 016
- Planning agency: MCD

Ber Sarai is a small neighbourhood located between Jawaharlal Nehru University (JNU) and IIT Delhi in the South West district of Delhi, India.

== Overview ==
The neighborhood comprises two distinct sections: Ber Sarai Village and Ber Sarai Delhi Development Authority (DDA) Flats. The village shares a wall with the hostels of IIT Delhi and is, at present, a dense collection of houses mixed with shops. The Ber Sarai has a market, which is known for new and second-hand bookshops. The nearest metro station is R. K. Puram metro station (on Magenta Line).

== Transport ==
The nearest road is an undivided and wide link between the Outer Ring Road and other areas of outer Delhi, such as Vasant Kunj. As this road forms a conduit, it sees heavy vehicular traffic in both directions. Ber Sarai is approximately 25 minutes by car from the Indira Gandhi International Airport.

== Electorate ==
The Ber Sarai neighbourhood is included within the "South Delhi" electoral constituency of Delhi. This constituency has been the battleground of two candidates over the years: Ramesh Kumar of Congress, who replaced his brother Sajjan Kumar (a senior leader of the party and ex member of parliament) and Sher Singh Dagar Ex MLA of the Bharatiya Janata Party (BJP). Naresh Yadav of the Aam Aadmi Party is the current MLA of this area.
