= List of people executed in India =

The number of people executed in India since independence in 1947 is a matter of dispute. Research by the People's Union for Democratic Rights (PUDR) has located government records of 1,422 executions in 16 states in the decade from 1953 to 1963 alone. PUDR located this information in an appendix of the 35th report of the Fourth Law Commission in 1967. In 2015, the National Law University, Delhi compiled a list of persons executed in India since 1947 and found that at least 752 individuals had been executed, including the period from 1 January to 15 August 1947. Their report was compiled "as per responses received from Central prisons in India. Certain prisons have either provided information only for a limited period or refused to provide any information or did not have any records available." Therefore, the actual number of persons would be much more than 752. While information about the number of executions should be available with individual prison departments within each state, the government has been reluctant to share such information. For example, authorities in Kerala claimed that all records of executions had been destroyed by termites. Andhra Pradesh gave the same reason for not furnishing post-1968 records. Bihar claimed that the state did not maintain records of executions, while Tamil Nadu's Additional Director General of Police (Prisons) refused to provide any records at all. According to Alexander Jacob, Additional Director General of Police (Prisons) of Kerala, "nearly 50 people had been executed in Kerala in the post-Independence period".

Rasha alias Raghuraj Singh, executed on 9 September 1947 at Jabalpur Central Jail, is presumed to be the first person executed in independent India. Akshay Thakur, Mukesh Singh, Pawan Gupta and Vinay Sharma, who were hanged on 20 March 2020, were the last persons to be executed in India. Rattan Bai Jain, executed on 3 January 1955 at Tihar Jail, is presumed to be the first and only woman executed in independent India.

== List ==
This is not an exhaustive list of prisoners executed in independent India, and is not meant to be a reference for the total number of prisoners who have been executed in India since independence. There are no official collated figures available for executions in India, and this list has been compiled from multiple sources. Unless otherwise noted, all persons were executed by hanging.

No.	Name	Date	Sex	Age	Location		Capital offence(s)	Notes	Source
No.	Name	Date	Sex	Age	Prison	State	Capital offence(s)	Notes	Source
1	Raghuraj Singh	9 September 1947	M	27	Jabalpur Central Jail	Central Provinces and Berar	Murder		
2	Mahantappa Gangappa	30 December 1947	M	30	Belgaum Central Jail	Bombay State			
3	Singavarapu Mahalakshmudu	3 April 1948	M	32	Rajahmundry Central Prison	Madras Presidency			
4	Bhavana Venkadu	13 April 1948	M	40	Rajahmundry Central Prison	Madras Presidency			
5	Kancharagunta Subbaiah	24 April 1948	M	28	Rajahmundry Central Prison	Madras Presidency			
6	Kalidindi Venkata Narasimha Raju	17 May 1948	M	24	Rajahmundry Central Prison	Madras Presidency			
7	Basapppa Gundappa Hadignal	31 July 1948	M	35	Belgaum Central Jail	Bombay State			
8	Uppara Bala Obigan Subanna	13 July 1949	M	60	Rajahmundry Central Prison	Madras Presidency			
9	Chenchu China Rami Reddy	13 July 1949	M	35	Rajahmundry Central Prison	Madras Presidency			
10	Chenchu Peda Rami Reddy	13 July 1949	M	48	Rajahmundry Central Prison	Madras Presidency			
11	Jamula Lakshmi Reddy	13 July 1949	M	33	Rajahmundry Central Prison	Madras Presidency			
12	Poreddypedda Thippa Reddy	13 July 1949	M	25	Rajahmundry Central Prison	Madras Presidency			
13	Uppara Chinna Pullappa	13 July 1949	M	35	Rajahmundry Central Prison	Madras Presidency			
14	Jonada Musalaiah	10 October 1949	M	24	Rajahmundry Central Prison	Madras Presidency			
15	Hanmanth Bhimappa Bhaskari	17 October 1949	M	35	Belgaum Central Jail	Bombay State			
16	Nathuram Godse	15 November 1949	M	39	Ambala Central Jail	East Punjab	Murder	Assassination of Mahatma Gandhi	
17	Narayan Apte	15 November 1949	M	39	Ambala Central Jail	East Punjab	Conspiracy to murder	Assassination of Mahatma Gandhi	
18	Adyayya Parappa Ramgouda	16 January 1950	M	35	Belgaum Central Jail	Bombay State			
19	Sanna Hanamappa Yamanappa Gadgi	20 February 1951	M	55	Belgaum Central Jail	Bombay State			
20	Vithoba Krishna Thorat	8 February 1951	M	62	Belgaum Central Jail	Bombay State			
21	Roshonlal	20 October 1951	M	NA	Alipore Jail	West Bengal	Murder	Murders of Moni Sharma and Bela Sharma	
22	Sidappa Basavaneppa Shiddanavar	17 December 1951	M	25	Belgaum Central Jail	Bombay State			
23	Shyama Charan Shukla/Sukul	21 June 1952	M	38	Alipore Central Jail	West Bengal	First person executed in West Bengal		
24	Dyayappa Adivappa Dadi	22 August 1953	M	28	Belgaum Central Jail	Bombay State			
25	Rattan Bai Jain	3 January 1955	F	35	Tihar Jail	New Delhi	Murder of 3 girls	First woman executed in independent India	
26	Ram Chariter Show	7 January 1955	M		Presidency Correctional Home	West Bengal			
27	Shivarudrappa Virbhadrappa Bhandigani	15 December 1955	M	21	Belgaum Central Jail	Bombay State			
28	Hanmanth Bhimappa Sullanavar	19 December 1955	M	40	Belgaum Central Jail	Bombay State			
29	Yallappa Nilappa Annigeri	30 December 1955	M	35	Belgaum Central Jail	Bombay State			
30	Birendra Nath Dutta	28 January 1956	M		Alipore Central Jail	West Bengal			
31	Tippanna Ningappa Agsar	16 May 1956	M	50	Belgaum Central Jail	Bombay State			
32	Pandurang Tatyasaheb Shinde	18 June 1956	M	40	Belgaum Central Jail	Bombay State			
33	Sadashiv Satteppa Khanchanale	9 July 1956	M	27	Belgaum Central Jail	Bombay State			
34	Bhimappa Shivarayappa Nandi	31 July 1956	M	39	Belgaum Central Jail	Bombay State			
35	Yallappa Somappa Nandi	31 July 1956	M	19	Belgaum Central Jail	Bombay State			
36	Parasappa Somappa Nandi	31 July 1956	M	28	Belgaum Central Jail	Bombay State			
37	Dundappa Basappa Bhadrashetti	11 September 1956	M	32	Belgaum Central Jail	Bombay State			
38	Gopal Chandra Ghosh	8 February 1957	M		Presidency Correctional Home	West Bengal			
39	Shew Prasad alias Lall	20 December 1957	M		Presidency Correctional Home	West Bengal			
40	Shamsher Sheikh	10 May 1958	M		Alipore Central Jail	West Bengal			
41	Sher Mohammad	10 May 1958	M		Alipore Central Jail	West Bengal			
42	Abdul Khaleque	12 May 1958	M		Presidency Correctional Home	West Bengal			
43	Asgar Ali alias Ashu	12 May 1958	M		Presidency Correctional Home	West Bengal			
44	Gura Sahu/Guna Show	29 May 1958	M		Alipore Central Jail	West Bengal			
45	Bachan Singh	23 June 1958	M		Tihar Jail, New Delhi	Delhi			
46	Ajit Bose	9 August 1958	M		Presidency Correctional Home	West Bengal			
47	Dhanamath Guru alias Badis	18 August 1958	M	47	Berhampore Circle Jail	Orissa			
48	Fakir Ahamed	8 November 1958	M		Presidency Correctional Home	West Bengal			
49	Bipin Bihari Sarkar	24 January 1959	M		Presidency Correctional Home	West Bengal			
50	Bishnu Charan Saha	24 January 1959	M		Presidency Correctional Home	West Bengal			
51	Pyare Lal	16 June 1959	M		Tihar Jail, New Delhi	Delhi			
52	Gurunath Govindrao Deshpande	27 July 1959	M	31	Belgaum Central Jail	Mysore State			
53	Ram Gopal	21 September 1959	M		Tihar Jail, New Delhi	Delhi			
54	Bholanath Choudhury/Sadhukhan	23 September 1959	M		Alipore Central Jail	West Bengal			
55	Yamanappa Tippanna Savadi	29 February 1960	M	35	Belgaum Central Jail	Mysore State			
56	Chinthala Gangula Reddy	10 August 1960	M	30	Rajahmundry Central Prison	Andhra Pradesh			
57	Pulagam Ramarao	12 September 1960	M	18	Rajahmundry Central Prison	Andhra Pradesh			
58	Dhan Bhadur	11 October 1960	M		Jammu District Jail	Jammu and Kashmir			
59	Bhadur Singh	11 October 1960	M		Jammu District Jail	Jammu and Kashmir			
60	Lalsing Mahasing Gurkha	21 November 1960	M	30	Belgaum Central Jail	Mysore State			
61	Narain Singh	7 December 1960	M		Tihar Jail, New Delhi	Delhi			
62	Jampana Satyanarayana Raju	24 January 1961	M	30	Rajahmundry Central Prison	Andhra Pradesh			
63	Sahidul Rahaman	1 April 1961	M		Dum Dum Central Correctional Home	West Bengal			
64	Durga Prasad Katik	1 April 1961	M		Dum Dum Central Correctional Home	West Bengal			
65	Bandi Mungulu	11 April 1961	M	35	Rajahmundry Central Prison	Andhra Pradesh			
66	Aditya Narayan Chatterjee	2 June 1961	M		Presidency Correctional Home	West Bengal			
67	Boya Danja Yerramala	17 October 1961	M	24	Rajahmundry Central Prison	Andhra Pradesh			
68	Md. Sharif	13 November 1961	M		Tihar Jail, New Delhi	Delhi			
69	Attar Singh	4 January 1962	M		Jammu District Jail	Jammu and Kashmir			
70	Ramdeo Kurmi	12 February 1962	M		Alipore Central Jail	West Bengal			
71	Sovan Mati/Shovan alias Palan Mali	12 February 1962	M		Alipore Central Jail	West Bengal			
72	Sudama Singh	21 May 1962	M		Dum Dum Central Correctional Home	West Bengal	Murder	Murders of two men	
73	Ram Sankar Singh	21 May 1962	M		Dum Dum Central Correctional Home	West Bengal			
74	Sanivarapu Venkateswarlu Reddy	26 May 1962	M	19	Rajahmundry Central Prison	Andhra Pradesh			
75	Babulal Das alias Bhuku Das	8 June 1962	M		Presidency Correctional Home	West Bengal			
76	Kummara Eswarppa	10 September 1962	M	40	Rajahmundry Central Prison	Andhra Pradesh			
77	Ediga	21 December 1962	M	45	Belgaum Central Jail	Mysore State			
78	Chintehalapudi Andiah	9 January 1963	M	40	Rajahmundry Central Prison	Andhra Pradesh			
79	Sk. Babu Sahib	16 January 1963	M	30	Rajahmundry Central Prison	Andhra Pradesh			
80	Hamam Singh	19 June 1963	M		Tihar Jail	Delhi			
81	Bhagwan Singh	19 June 1963	M		Tihar Jail	Delhi			
82	Arjunen alias Polka Damb	29 June 1963	M	22	Berhampore Circle Jail	Orissa			
83	Nagappa Sahebgoudar Patil	26 July 1963	M	42	Belgaum Central Jail	Mysore State			
84	Sitaram Kaher	1 September 1963	M		Alipore Central Jail	West Bengal			
85	Sultan Mondal	22 October 1963	M		Presidency Correctional Home	West Bengal			
86	Ram Singh	13 March 1964	M		Tihar Jail	Delhi			
87	Sohan Singh	31 March 1964	M		Tihar Jail	Delhi			
88	Boya Sanajjimmappa	8 May 1964	M	32	Rajahmundry Central Prison	Andhra Pradesh			
89	Yashwant Bandu koli	10 August 1964	M	45	Belgaum Central Jail	Mysore State			
90	Khetra Mohan Dhali	12 August 1964	M		Alipore Central Jail	West Bengal			
91	Sathi Venkaiah	23 November 1964	M	50	Rajahmundry Central Prison	Andhra Pradesh			
92	Bhramar Singh/Bhomour Singh	1 April 1965	M		Alipore Central Jail	West Bengal			
93	Suman Singh/Samundar Singh	1 April 1965	M		Alipore Central Jail	West Bengal			
94	Gansa Pahan	7 June 1965	M		Presidency Correctional Home	West Bengal			
95	Jwala Ran	29 December 1965	M		Patiala Central Jail	Punjab			
96	Srichand	26 October 1966	M		Tihar Jail	Delhi			
97	Manzoor Ahmad	26 October 1966	M		Tihar Jail	Delhi			
98	Lochan Pal	26 July 1967	M		Tihar Jail	Delhi			
99	Hasansab Imamsab Jatagar	17 August 1967	M	42	Belgaum Central Jail	Mysore State			
100	Maslansab Dadasab Jatagar	17 August 1967	M	40	Belgaum Central Jail	Mysore State			
101	Abdul Fakirsab Jatagar	17 August 1967	M	40	Belgaum Central Jail	Mysore State			
102	Polanki Ayyanna	28 February 1968	M	40	Rajahmundry Central Prison	Andhra Pradesh			
103	Kurra Chakram	28 February 1968	M	30	Rajahmundry Central Prison	Andhra Pradesh			
104	Madkami Mala	18 May 1968	M	37	Berhampore Circle Jail	Orissa			
105	Rayi alias Rayi Narasaih	19 June 1968	M	50	Rajahmundry Central Prison	Andhra Pradesh			
106	Penbnagonda Chinna Chenna Reddy	8 August 1968	M	42	Rajahmundry Central Prison	Andhra Pradesh			
107	Sucha Singh Bassi	21 September 1970	M		Rohtak Central Prison	Punjab	Murder	Assassination of Partap Singh Kairon	
108	Nahar Singh "Fauji"	21 September 1970	M		Rohtak Central Prison	Punjab	Murder	Assassination of Partap Singh Kairon	
109	Baldev Singh	21 September 1970	M		Rohtak Central Prison	Punjab	Murder	Assassination of Partap Singh Kairon	
110	Dharam Singh	22 January 1971	M		Patiala Central Jail	Punjab			
111	Raghab Naik	3 August 1971	M	43	Berhampore Circle Jail	Orissa			
112	Jai Chand	7 October 1974	M		Tihar Jail	Delhi			
113	Hukum Chand	7 October 1974	M		Tihar Jail	Delhi			
114	Malakendra Ramachandra Patil	20 June 1975	M	40	Belgaum Central Jail	Karnataka			
115	Sambhaji Vithal Patil	20 June 1975	M	26	Belgaum Central Jail	Karnataka			
116	Shivaji Vithal Patil	20 June 1975	M	24	Belgaum Central Jail	Karnataka			
117	Girimallappa Rudrappa Madgalli	20 June 1975	M	24	Belgaum Central Jail	Karnataka			
118	Rajappa Pandappa Nannavar	20 June 1975	M	25	Belgaum Central Jail	Karnataka			
119	Vemenappa Bhimappa Madar	20 June 1975	M	55	Belgaum Central Jail	Karnataka			
120	Bhumaiah Goud	1 December 1975	M	48	Musheerabad Jail	Andhra Pradesh (present-day Telangana)	Murder		
121	Kishtaiah Goud	1 December 1975	M	43	Musheerabad Jail	Andhra Pradesh (present-day Telangana)	Murder		
122	Nambi Kishtappa	February 1976	M		Rajahmundry Central Jail	Andhra Pradesh	Murder	Last convict executed in Andhra Pradesh	
123	Mohinder Singh	6 February 1976	M		Patiala Central Jail	Punjab			
125	Laxman Ram	31 October 1976	M		Jammu District Jail	Jammu and Kashmir			
126	Amrit Bhushan Gupta	18 January 1977	M		Tihar Jail	Delhi			
127	Shiv Mohan	7 April 1977	M		Tihar Jail	Delhi			
128	Baksis Singh	1 December 1977	M		Tihar Jail	Delhi			
130	Sidrai Siddappa Sonnad	18 March 1978	M	34	Belgaum Central Jail	Karnataka			
140	Khubanna Jakkappa Godekar	18 March 1978	M	42	Belgaum Central Jail	Karnataka			
141	Sabu Balappa Jaljannavar	18 March 1978	M	30	Belgaum Central Jail	Karnataka			
142	Dundappa Kashappa Managadi	18 March 1978	M	35	Belgaum Central Jail	Karnataka			
143	Basappa Shivappa Hadimani	18 March 1978	M	25	Belgaum Central Jail	Karnataka			
144	Kampatimar Shankariya	16 May 1979	M	27	Jaipur Central Jail	Rajasthan	Murder	Murder of over 70 people in 1977–1978	
145	Azhakesan	1979	M		Central Prison, Poojappura	Kerala	Murder	Killing of toddlers as part of black magic	
146	Kuljeet Singh alias Ranga	31 January 1982	M		Tihar Jail	Delhi	Kidnapping and Murder	Geeta and Sanjay Chopra kidnapping case	
147	Jasbir Singh alias Billa	31 January 1982	M		Tihar Jail	Delhi	Kidnapping and Murder	Geeta and Sanjay Chopra kidnapping case	
148	Balbir Singh	27 April 1983	M		Patiala Central Jail	Punjab			
149	Mehar Chand	3 May 1983	M	63	Jaipur Central Jail	Rajasthan	Murder		Murder of 5 people of the same family over a property dispute
150	Surjit Singh alias Jagjit Singh	6 May 1983	M		Patiala Central Jail	Punjab			
151	Ujagar Singh alias Santa Singh	9 October 1983	M		Tihar Jail	Delhi			
152	Kartar Singh	9 October 1983	M		Tihar Jail	Delhi			
153	Hanamanth Laxmappa Mallyar	9 November 1983	M	27	Belgaum Central Jail	Karnataka			
154	Rajendra Jakkal	27 November 1983	M		Yerwada Central Jail	Maharashtra	Murder	Joshi-Abhyankar serial murders	
155	Dilip Dhyanoba Sutar	27 November 1983	M		Yerwada Central Jail	Maharashtra	Murder	Joshi-Abhyankar serial murders	
156	Shantaram Kanhoji Jagtap	27 November 1983	M		Yerwada Central Jail	Maharashtra	Murder	Joshi-Abhyankar serial murders	
157	Munawar Harun Shah	27 November 1983	M		Yerwada Central Jail	Maharashtra	Murder	Joshi-Abhyankar serial murders	
158	Maqbool Bhat	11 February 1984	M	45	Tihar Jail	Delhi	Murder		
159	Gulzar Singh	14 June 1988	M		Patiala Central Jail	Punjab			
160	Bhajan Singh	14 June 1988	M		Patiala Central Jail	Punjab			
161	Raj Kumar	5 July 1988	M		Patiala Central Jail				
162	Baba Balyogi alias Ganpat	14 July 1988	M	29	Jaipur Central Jail	Rajasthan	Rape and murder		
163	Paramhans Yadav	1988	M			Bihar	Murder	Convicted of killing Gopalganj DM MPN Sharma	
164	Satwant Singh	6 January 1989	M	27	Tihar Jail	Delhi	Murder	Assassination of Indira Gandhi	
165	Kehar Singh	6 January 1989	M		Tihar Jail	Delhi	Conspiracy to murder	Assassination of Indira Gandhi	
166	Gurcharan Singh	16 June 1989	M		Patiala Central Jail	Punjab	Murder	Last persons to be executed in Punjab	
167	Pritam Singh	16 June 1989	M		Patiala Central Jail	Punjab	Murder	Last persons to be executed in Punjab	
168	Gulab Singh	28 June 1989	M		Ambala Central Jail	Haryana	Murder	Last person to be executed in Haryana	
169	Umaid Singh alias Umaida Ram	8 September 1989	M	45	Jaipur Central Jail	Rajasthan			
170	V Balakrishnan	16 March 1990	M	32	Central Prison, Kannur	Kerala	Murder	1984 Vakeri murder of 4 people	
171	Ripper Chandran	6 July 1991	M	40	Central Prison, Kannur	Kerala	Murder and rape	Serial killer in Kasaragod district and South Canara who murdered around 18 persons in the model of Jack the Ripper	
172	Kartick Seal/Sil	21 August 1991	M		Alipore Central Jail	West Bengal	Murder	Murder of 8 members of a family, including one woman and child, in 1987	
173	Sukumar Burman alias Sutku	21 August 1991	M		Alipore Central Jail	West Bengal	Murder	Murder of 8 members of a family, including one woman and child, in 1987	
174	Ranjeet Singh	28 November 1991	M	32	Jaipur Central Jail	Rajasthan	Murder	Mass murder along with Syo Lal	
175	Syo Lal	28 November 1991	M	76	Jaipur Central Jail	Rajasthan	Murder	Murder of his brother and his family members for property dispute	
176	Raj Gopal	10 February 1992	M		Jammu District Jail	Jammu and Kashmir	Murder		
177	Sukhdev Singh Sukha	9 October 1992	M	30	Yerwada Central Jail	Maharashtra	Murder	Murder of General Arun Shridhar Vaidya, Lalit Maken and Arjun Dass	
178	Harjinder Singh Jinda	9 October 1992	M	31	Yerwada Central Jail	Maharashtra	Murder	Murder of General Arun Shridhar Vaidya, Lalit Maken and Arjun Dass	
179	Laxman Naik	16 July 1994	M	36	Berhampore Circle Jail	Orissa	Rape and murder	Rape and murder of minor girl in forest while intoxicated	
180	Bheru Singh	20 August 1994	M	40	Jaipur Central Jail	Rajasthan	Murder	Murdered his wife Smt Kajodbai, his two daughters, one son	
181	Auto Shankar	27 April 1995	M	41	Salem Central Prison	Tamil Nadu	Murder	Murder of 6 persons, over a period of two years in 1988–1989	
182	Suresh Chandra Bahri	12 June 1995	M		Bhagalpur Central Jail	Bihar	Murder	Multiple account of murders of family members, including his wife Usha Bahri and children with help of his two friends.	
183	Ramchandra alias Ravjee	4 May 1996	M	29	Jaipur Central Jail	Rajasthan	Murder	Murder of 5 persons, including his pregnant wife and 3 children on 6 May 1993	
184	Surja Ram	7 April 1997	M	52	Jaipur Central Jail	Rajasthan	Murder	Murder of 5 persons; his brother, sister-in-law, their 2 sons and an aunt	
185	Kanta Prasad Tiwari	27 May 1997	M		Jabalpur Central Prison	Madhya Pradesh	Rape and murder	Rape and murder of 8 years old niece in state of being drunk.	
186	Dhananjoy Chatterjee	14 August 2004	M	39	Alipore Jail, Kolkata	West Bengal	Rape and murder	Rape and murder of 18-year-old Hetal Parekh on 5 March 1990	
187	Ajmal Kasab	21 November 2012	M	25	Yerwada Central Jail	Maharashtra	Murder, terrorist acts and waging war against the Government of India.	2008 Mumbai attacks surviving terrorist only	
188	Afzal Guru	9 February 2013	M	43	Tihar Jail	Delhi	Conspiracy of waging war against the Government Of India	2001 Indian Parliament attack	
189	Yakub Memon	30 July 2015	M	53	Central Jail, Nagpur	Maharashtra	Conspiracy of waging war against the Government Of India	1993 Bombay bombings	
190	Mukesh Singh	20 March 2020	M	32	Tihar Jail	Delhi	Gang Rape and Murder	2012 Delhi gang rape and murder	
191	Akshay Thakur	20 March 2020	M	31	Tihar Jail	Delhi	Gang Rape and Murder	2012 Delhi gang rape and murder	
192	Vinay Sharma	20 March 2020	M	26	Tihar Jail	Delhi	Gang Rape and Murder	2012 Delhi gang rape and murder	
193	Pawan Gupta	20 March 2020	M	26	Tihar Jail	Delhi	Gang Rape and Murder	2012 Delhi gang rape and murder	

== See also ==
- Capital punishment in India
