= Assassination of Arjun Dass =

1985 murder of politician in New Delhi, India

- Location: New Delhi, India
- Date: 4 September 1985; 41 years ago 9:20 am (IST)
- Target: Arjun Dass
- Attack type: Shooting
- Weapons: .55 revolver.38 revolver 9mm stengun
- Deaths: 2
- Injuries: 6
- Victim: 8
- Perpetrators: Harjinder Singh Jinda; Sukhdev Singh Sukha
- No. of participants: 6
- Motive: Reprisal for 1984 anti-Sikh riots

On 4 September 1985, at 9:20 am member of the Delhi Metropolitan Council, close associate of Sanjay Gandhi, and Congress leader Arjun Dass was assassinated by 3 Sikhs in Delhi. The assassins were Harjinder Singh Jinda, Sukhdev Singh Sukha, and another member of Jinda's group. They killed Dass in revenge for his role in the 1984 anti-Sikh riots. Along with Arjun Dass his bodyguard, a constable, was killed and 6 others were injured.

== Background ==
=== Anti-Sikh riots ===
1984 anti-Sikh riots were a series of organized pogroms against Sikhs in India following the assassination of Indira Gandhi by her Sikh bodyguards. Government estimates project that about 2,800 Sikhs were killed in Delhi and 3,350 nationwide, whilst independent sources estimate the number of deaths at about 8,000–17,000.

Arjun Dass was identified by eyewitnesses and human rights groups as leading mobs in the massacres. A mob led by him defecated on the Sikh holy book and living Guru, Guru Granth Sahib.

=== Hit-list ===
Harjinder Singh Jinda, and Sukhdev Singh Sukha soon after the riots created a hit list of politicians believed to be part of the violence. The names were H.K.L. Bhagat, Lalit Maken, Jagdish Tytler, Sajjan Kumar, Dharam Das Shastri, Jasbir Singh Jatt, Arjun Dass, and K.C. Pant.

=== Assassination of Lalit Maken ===
On 31 July 1985, Congress(I) Member of Parliament Lalit Maken was assassinated, when he was moving towards his car parked across the road from his house in Kirti Nagar, Delhi. Maken's wife Geetanjali and a visitor, Balkishan, were also caught in the firing and died. The assailants escaped on their scooters. Lalit Maken was considered to be involved in the killings of Sikhs during 1984 Anti-Sikh riots. In a 31-page booklet titled 'Who Are The Guilty', People's Union for Civil Liberties (PUCL) listed 227 people who led the mobs, which killed up to 18,000 Sikhs over three days. Lalit Maken's name was third on the list. The assassins were Harjinder Singh Jinda, and Sukhdev Singh Sukha.

== Assassination ==
On 4 September 1985, Jinda, Sukha, and the other Singh made their way to Arjun Dass' auto parts shop which was in a crowded marketplace. Jinda and Sukha were on a stole scooter while Nimma was on a three-wheeler. They had removed all identifiers of the vehicles. Jinda had a .55 revolver. Sukha had a .38 revolver and the other had a 9mm stengun. Once they reached Dass' shop Jinda continued to sit on the scooter as the getaway driver. Sukha shot Dass' guard in the head killing him instantly. The other Singh shot another guard. Both then unloaded fire into Arjun Dass. In total, they fired 29 bullets. All of them quickly fled the scene. While fleeing the assassins yelled, "Long live Khalistan."

== Aftermath ==
5 minutes after the killing, a police jeep was sent to the scene. After emergency treatment, Arjun Dass was pronounced dead at the All India Institute of Medical Science. Roadblocks were set up in Delhi and neighboring districts an hour after the killing. After the killing, the Home Ministry began plans to create anti-terrorist squads in key cities. Other politicians who led mobs in the anti-Sikh riots were provided security in reaction to Dass' killing. The homes of MP Jagdish Tytler, former MP Dharam Das Shastri, and Minister of Parliamentary Affairs H.K.L. Bhagat were given security from the Special Frontier Force. All 3 were named in the paper 'Who Are The Guilty'. More than 2,000 men with Stenguns, carbines and West German sub-machine guns and with 500 vehicles were assigned to guard individuals believed to be on the Sikh's hit-list. They were gathered from the Central Reserve Police Force, National Security Guard, Delhi Armed Police, Border Security Force, and Intelligence Bureau. Some were placed in the Very Very High Security Risk (VVHSR) category, such as Prime Minister Rajiv Gandhi, H.K.L. Bhagat, Jagdish Tytler. The latter 2 were named in 'Who Are The Guilty'. In another category named Very High Security Risk (VHSR) 2 involved in the riots were given security. Them being former MP Sajjan Kumar, and Dharam Das Shastri.
