= Chillar (disambiguation) =

Chillar or Cilár (Punjabi: ਚਿਲਰ) is a surname associated with certain non-Hindu gotras within the Jat community, historically known for their role as sikh risaldars.

Chillar may also refer to:

- Chillar, is a village in Haryana state India.
- Hondh-Chillar massacre on November 2, 1984, in Chillar village
- Chillar Party, a 2011 Indian family comedy film
- Chíllar River, a river in the east of the Province of Málaga, Spain.
- Chillar (surname)
- Chillar, Buenos Aires, a town in Argentina.

== See also ==
- Chillara
