= The Mastermind Jinda Sukha =

The Mastermind- Jinda Sukha
- Directed by: Sukhjinder Singh Shera
- Written by: Sukhjinder Shera; Jaswinder Shinda
- Based on: Letters from Jail by Harjinder Singh Jinda
- Produced by: Sukhchain Singh
- Starring: Nav Bajwa; Sonpreet Jawanda; Isha Sharma; Guggu Gill; Sunita Dhir
- Music by: Joy Atul
- Production companies: Singh Brothers Productions; Braveheart Productions
- Release date: 11 September 2015
- Country: India
- Language: Punjabi
- Budget: ₹2.5 crore (US$260,000)

The Mastermind Jinda Sukha is 2015 Indian Punjabi-language film initially released on11 September 2015. The film is based on letters exchanged by Harjinder Singh Jinda and Sukhdev Singh Sukha (the assassins of Indian Army chief Arun Shridhar Vaidya) during their imprisonment in Pune.

== Cast ==
Cast of The Mastermind Jinda Sukha is:

- Nav Bajwa
- Sonpreet Jawanda
- Guggu Gill
- Sukhjinder Shera
- Satwant Kaur
- Harinder Bubb
- Isha Sharma
- Sunita Dhir
- Davvy Singh
- Amritpal Singh (Billa)
- Jaggi Dhuri
- Parminder Gill

== Shooting ==
The Mastermind Jinda Sukha is shot at Harjinder Singh Jinda's and Sukhdev Singh Sukha's villages. Its also shot at different locations of Pune city. But shooting at Gen Vaidya Marg (Old Anderson Road) was not allowed as its location falls in cantonment area for which film crew was not granted permission by Indian Army officials.

== Release ==
The Mastermind Jinda Sukha was to release on 11 September 2015 worldwide and was cleared by Central Board of Film Certification on 24 July 2015. The certification was withdrawn on 9 September 2015, after Ministry of Home Affairs was alerted by Intelligence Bureau. Film critic and former member of the CBFC Shubhra Gupta criticised the ban and questioned censorship vs certification in India. Other CBFC member and filmmaker Ashoke Pandit, also criticised CBFC chairman Pahlaj Nihalani’s decision to Ban the movie.

Film was released overseas on 11 September 2015.
