= Harjinder Singh Jinda =

Indian assassin (1961-1992)

- Born: 4 April 1961; Village Gadli, Amritsar, Punjab, India
- Died: 9 October 1992 (aged 31); Pune, Maharashtra, India
- Cause of death: Execution by hanging
- Organization: Khalistan Commando Force
- Height: 5 ft 7 in (170 cm)
- Movement: Khalistan Movement
- Status: Executed
- Conviction: Assassination of Arun Shridhar Vaidya
- Penalty: Death

Harjinder Singh Jinda (4 April 1961 – 9 October 1992) was a Sikh militant and one of the two assassins of an Indian Army general Arun Vaidya. He was responsible for three high-profile assassinations: Arjan Dass, Lalit Maken and Gen. Vaidya. He also was involved in an attempted assassination of DGP Julio Ribeiro. He along with other members of Khalistan Commando Force participated in Indian history's biggest bank robbery of ₹57 million (equivalent to ₹780 million or US$8.1 million in 2026), from Punjab National Bank, Miller Gunj branch, Ludhiana to finance the militancy for a separate Sikh state of Khalistan.

== Early life ==
Jinda was born on 4 April 1962 in village of Gadli, in district Amritsar, to a Jat Sikh farmer family of Gulzar Singh and Gurnam Kaur. After completing his early education, he enrolled in Khalsa College, Amritsar.

Jinda had three siblings, Nirbhail Singh, Bhupinder Singh and Balvinder Kaur. One of his other nephew, Surjit Singh Penta had committed suicide by consuming cyanide during Operation Black Thunder.

== Participation in the Khalistan movement ==
In 1983 Jinda was first arrested over an attack on a police officer. Jinda was interrogated and released after a long time. He was completing his Bachelor of Fine Arts, when Operation Blue Star occurred. This incident motivated him to leave his studies and join the Khalistan separatist movement afterwards.

=== Delhi bank robberies ===
While living in Delhi, Jinda formed a robbery gang consisting of him, Baljinder Singh, Sukhvinder Singh, and Harvinder Singh. On 4 March 1985 they robbed the Union Bank of India in Anand Niketan, Delhi. ₹45,000 (equivalent to ₹730,000 or US$7,500 in 2026) were robbed. Jinda also aided in the planning of a robbery at the State Bank of India in Greater Kailash, Delhi. The robbery was done by Sukhdev Singh Sukha on March 15 of 1985 at 7:15 p.m. Over ₹400,000 (equivalent to ₹6.5 million or US$67,000 in 2026) rupees were looted.

=== Assassination of Lalit Maken ===
Jinda and Sukhdev Singh Sukha assassinated Congress(I) Member of Parliament Lalit Maken on 31 July 1985, when he was moving towards his car parked across the road from his house in Kirti Nagar, Delhi. The three assailants continued firing even as Maken ran towards his house for cover. Maken's wife Geetanjali and a visitor, Balkishan, were also caught in the firing and died. The assailants escaped on their scooters. Lalit Maken was considered to be involved in the killings of Sikhs during the 1984 Anti-Sikh riots. In a 31-page booklet titled 'Who Are The Guilty', People's Union for Civil Liberties (PUCL) listed 227 people who led the mobs, which killed up to 18,000 Sikhs over three days. Lalit Maken's name was third on the list. A press report has indicated that someone named Bakshish Singh was also involved along with Jinda in this assassination. Ranjit Singh "Gill" was arrested by Interpol in New Jersey, USA on 14 May 1987, a federal magistrate approved his extradition on 6 February 1988 and he was deported back to India in February 2000 after lengthy legal cases and was sentenced to life imprisonment on 24 February 2003. Finally his life sentence was commuted on 20 May 2009.

=== Attempted assassination of Rajiv Gandhi and Zail Singh ===
Harjinder Singh Jinda revealed in interrogation that immediately after killing Lalit Maken he took position outside of a hospital anticipating Rajiv Gandhi and Zail Singh to visit. He planned to kill them both. He was unable to get a shot because of a large crowd.

=== Assassination of Arjan Dass ===
Congress (I) leader, member of Delhi Metropolitan Council, and close associate of Sanjay Gandhi, Arjun Dass was assassinated on 5 September 1985 by Jinda, Sukha using stenguns because of his involvement in 1984 Anti-Sikh riots. His plain clothed bodyguard, a Constable, was also killed. 5 others were wounded. Jinda and Sukha left the scene shouting, “Long live Khalistan”. Arjan Dass's name appeared in various affidavits submitted by Sikh victims to Nanavati Commission which was headed by G.T. Nanavati, retired Judge of the Supreme Court of India. He was also identified among organisers of the carnage. Arjun Dass was a close friend of Prime Minister of India Rajiv Gandhi.

=== Arrest and escape ===
On 16 January 1986, Jinda was arrested by Delhi Police. He was arrested over a theft of a car, but soon connected with a bank robbery in Ahmedabad. Police at the time did not know of Jinda’s previous crimes. After an initial interrogation police realised that he was a high profile militant, but still did not know what crimes he had committed. He was suspected of bank robberies. He was interrogated after by Ved Marwah at the Crime Branch Interrogation Centre. After this he was transferred to Gujarat and the case was taken over by Gujarat Police. He escaped at Ahmedabad while being transported to court from jail. He is said to have, “…literally walked out of police custody…”.

=== Jalandhar bank robbery ===
According to Harjinder Singh Jinda after Labh Singh was broken free they both met each other in Jalandhar along with Manbir Singh Chaheru. By this time Jinda was part of Khalistan Commando Force. Chaheru had told them that they were in urgent need of money. Labh Singh and Jinda told Chaheru that they would get the cash in a week. They began to scout banks in Jalandhar and selected one to rob. 3 days later at 11 in the morning Labh Singh, Jinda, and others robbed the bank of ₹1.25 million (equivalent to ₹19 million or US$190,000 in 2026)

=== Assassination of General Vaidya ===
In 1984, General Arun Vaidya had planned and supervised Operation Blue Star, a controversial military operation ordered by Indira Gandhi, then Prime Minister of India, in order to flush out a group of heavily armed Sikh militants in June 1984 at the Golden Temple, the holiest shrine of the Sikhs.

Vaidya had moved to Pune after his retirement from the army. On 10 August 1986, General Arun Vaidya was shot to death by Jinda and Sukha while he was driving his car home from the market. According to the police, the assailants pulled up next to his car on motor scooters and fired eight or nine shots into the car. Vaidya reportedly died instantly of head and neck wounds. His wife, who was also in the car, was wounded by four bullets in her back and thighs. According to Indian intelligence sources, Vaidya had been the number four assassination target on lists by Sikh militants and he was one of several people killed in retaliation for Operation Blue Star. Following the assassination, the Khalistan Commando Force issued a statement declaring that Vaidya had been killed in retaliation for the Operation Blue Star.

=== Attempted Assassination of Khushwant Singh ===
After killing Vaidya Jinda searched for Khushwant Singh who had been on the hit list of Sikhs for his comments against Sant Jarnail Singh Bhindranwale. Jinda made his way to Delhi and entered Khushwant’s apartment. Jinda drank some water and look at Khushwant’s sitting room. Jinda then trailed Khushwant to Kasauli, but decided to leave him after feeling he was being shadowed.

=== Attack on Director General of Punjab Police ===
On 3 October 1986, 6 men identified in the press as Sikh militants in police uniforms attacked Director General of Punjab Police Julio Francis Ribeiro inside his headquarters in the city of Jalandhar, Punjab, with automatic weapons. According to Ribeiro he was strolling with his wife when Sikh militants in a jeep disguised as a police one asked to inspect a guards gun. The guards gave the gun for inspection. Soon three Sikh began climbing the wall and sprayed fire. After 2 minutes of fire they fled. Throughout all of this no officer returned fire or attempted to chase the Sikh. According to Jinda the attack on Riberio was a primary goal for them. Jinda recruited PAP officers to assist them in the attack. According to Jinda Labh Singh, Ajit Singh, Dalwinder Singh, Charanjit Singh Channi, Kanwarjit Singh Sultanwadi, Vijaypal Singh, and Head Constable Dhanna Singh took part in the action. One guard was killed, and Ribeiro, his wife, and four other officers were injured. Ribeiro's wound was minor, but his wife was hospitalized. Khalistan Commando Force later claimed responsibility for this attack. KCF leader Labh Singh allegedly led the attack. Jinda was also part of the group that attacked Riberio.

=== Assassination of Kalicharan Sharma ===
In November 1986 Jinda and fellow KCF members killed Congress leader Kalicharan Sharma in Ludhiana. He was a major leader of Hindus. Sharma had been a critic of the Punjabi Suba movement, and Jarnail Singh Bhindranwale.

=== Assassination of Inspector General Trilok Chand Katoch ===
On 11 January 1987, Jinda and a fellow militant of the Khalistan Commando Force assassinated Inspector General of Punjab Prisons Trilok Chand Katoch. Katoch was killed in 3 shoots near his home in Chandigarh. Jinda and another fled on a scooter. Katoch was the highest ranking police official to be killed up to that point. Jinda reavled the reasons why Katoch was assassinated in his letters. According to him Katoch had tortured Sikhs and falsely imprisoned them. Most notably he tortured Nachitar Singh Rode, the assassin of Lala Jagat Narain.

=== India's biggest bank robbery ===
On 13 February 1987, Jinda along with other members of Khalistan Commando Force, including its chief general Labh Singh, participated in the biggest bank robbery of Indian history and robbed Rs. ₹57 million (equivalent to ₹780 million or US$8.1 million in 2026) from Punjab National Bank, Miller Gunj branch, Ludhiana a part of this robbed money belonged to the Reserve Bank of India, India's central bank. The Chicago Sun-Times reported that "12 to 15 Sikhs dressed as policemen and armed with submachine guns and rifles escaped with nearly $4.5 million in the biggest bank robbery in Indian history." "No one was injured." A Police spokesman described it as "a neat and clean operation". As per Indian Express, current KCF chief Paramjit Singh Panjwar was also involved in it.

It was documented as "Biggest Bank Robbery" under "Curiosities and wonders" in Limca Book of Records. Other Khalistan Commando Force members who participated with Jinda in this event were Mathra Singh, Paramjit Singh Panjwar, Satnam Singh Bawa, Gurnam Singh Bundala Sukhdev Singh Sukha, Daljit Singh Bittu, Gursharan Singh Gamma and Pritpal Singh etc. It enabled his organisation Khalistan Commando Force to buy weapons such as AK-47 rifles. The Los Angeles Times has mentioned that bank robberies have been a major means of financing the Sikh militants' campaign for a separate state of Khalistan.

=== Assassination of Communist leader ===
On 16 February 1987, Harjinder Singh Jinda killed Communist Party of India (Marxist) veteran leader and MLA Chanan Singh near Hoshiarpur. In a letter to the media Jinda said that Dhoot committed blasphemy and spoke out against Sikhs.

=== Escape ===
On 30 March 1987 Harjinder Singh Jinda was being transported by police. 15 KCF members, who were armed with submachine guns and pistols, surrounded a rouge police van and blocked the front and back with two vehicles. They demanded Jinda be released or they would open fire. Jinda was released and the militants fled.

=== Sikh moral code ===
In late March 1987 Jinda and Labh Singh issued a moral code to which they insisted all Sikh should adhere. The policies were to end dancing at weddings, end music at weddings, end to the wearing of non-traditional clothing, no tweezing of eyebrows for girls, no snipping of beards for boys, no baraats that include more than 11 people, no participation in Hindu jagratas or all-night prayers, no associating with Radhasoami Sikhs, no school uniforms that are not saffron black, and white and the end of the sale and consumption of meat, alcohol and tobacco.

Those who did not respect the law were warned that they would be burnt alive. The code was largely followed. Sikh women began wearing traditional clothing and many meat, alcohol and tobacco shops closed. Many restaurants introduced vegetarian items to their menus. Some did not follow the decree which put them in danger. Those who did not follow were forced to either pay off Sikhs or get security. Sikh leaders generally supported the decree. The enforcement of the decree in its first 2 months resulted in at least 6 killed, 60 shops burned, and complete or partial closure of 1,500 businesses.

One survey found that there were no meat or cigarette shops between Amritsar and Phagwara. Restaurants that had previously served meat had removed it from their menus and denied having ever serving it.

According to Assistant Deputy Inspector General of Police in Jalandhar A.S. Siddiqui the moral code had significant popularity among Sikhs especially those living in the rural area. He said, “Women seem to be pleased with it and there is also the fact that the AISSF has been on a massive recruitment drive through their amrit prachar (preaching of Sikh baptism) meetings. There is one meeting a day in the state, and after every meeting an estimated 200 youths pledge themselves to the service of the panth."

Militants justified the moral code by saying, "No avatars, Hindu or Sikh, ever did these things. To eat meat is the job of rakshasas (demons) and we don't want people to become rakshasas."

== Arrest and death ==
On 17 September 1986, Sukha got into an accident with a truck in Pimpri, Pune and was arrested. He was riding the same black motorcycle which was used at the time of assassination of General Vaidya. Jinda was arrested at Gurdwara Majnoo Daa Tilla, Delhi on 31 August 1987. He was shot in the legs at the time of his arrest. During their court trial, despite admitting to the killing, they pleaded not-guilty, justifying their actions by saying that Vaidya was "guilty of a serious crime, the punishment for which could only be death". They were awarded death sentences at 2:05 pm on 21 October 1989. Sukha and Jinda also wrote a letter to president of India asking for "No-Clemency" prior to their hanging.

On 9 October 1992, early in the morning, Sukhdev Singh "Sukha" and Harjinder Singh "Jinda" were executed by hanging in Pune Jail. The Independent World mentioned "While being led from their cell to the gallows set up in the Yerawada gaol yard, the two convicted killers shouted slogans for Sikh independence in the Punjab".

Both of them were hanged at 4 am in Yerwada Central Jail Pune while extraordinary security was deployed at the jail and in the periphery of Pune to oppose any possible Sikh militants attack. Security was also tightened all over Northern India.

=== Public protests ===
The Independent World reported that "..their hanging sparked off protests by students and shop-keepers in the Sikh-dominated state of Punjab" and "Security forces were put on alert in New Delhi, Pune, the southern city where the two assassins were hanged, and throughout the Punjab.".

=== Memorial service and subsequent seizure of Golden Temple by the government ===
On their memorial service, hundreds of troops and police surrounded the Golden Temple. In the early morning hundreds of Sikhs were ordered to move out of the Golden Temple. Sikh leaders Simranjit Singh Mann, Gurcharan Singh Tohra and 300 others were arrested in the statewide arrests. Some people were baton charged when they tried to enter this religious place. Approximately 300 Sikhs openly resisted the police clampdown and held the 30-minute memorial service inside the complex while chanting slogans hailing the assassins and in support of Sikh homeland Khalistan. Jinda and Sukha's fathers were presented with gold medals by Golden Temple priest. Police seize of the temple was lifted 3 hours after the memorial service

== Honours and anniversaries ==
In October 1999, his death anniversary was celebrated in his village Gadli, Amritsar district, where chief of Akal Takhat Amritsar, Giani Puran Singh declared Jinda a national martyr while justifying his action of killing general Vaidya. Some Akali leaders stayed away from this function.

On 9 October 2000, representatives of all major Sikh bodies, including ruling Shiromani Akali Dal, the SHSAD, the SGPC, the Damdami Taksal, AISSF and the Dal Khalsa attended the eighth death anniversary of Harjinder Singh Jinda and Sukhdev Singh Sukha. To honour Jinda and Sukha, Giani Joginder Singh Vedanti, Head of Akal Takht (Supreme Sikh temporal seat), performed the 'ardas' (a Sikh religious rite). Both Sukha and Jinda were declared "great martyrs" of the Sikh nation during this event.

On 9 October 2002, according to The Tribune, on Jinda's death anniversary, "Tributes were paid to the assassins of General Vaidya – Jinda and Sukhdev Singh Sukha" and Jinda's mother was honoured by Giani Joginder Singh Vedanti, chief of Akal Takhat.

In October 2005, the anniversary of his death was celebrated in his native village of Gadli by various Sikh organisation including Dal Khalsa, Damdami Taksal, Akal Federation and Sikh Students Federation etc. and his family was again honoured by Dal Khalsa in Fateh Garh Sahib in Punjab, India.

Dashmesh Durbar Sikh temple in Surrey, Canada recently organised special prayers for both Jinda and Sukha in Canada

On 9 October 2008, Shiromani Gurdwara Prabandhak Committee honoured kin of Jinda and Sukha in the Golden Temple complex, to mark the anniversaries of their death. SGPC declared Jinda and Sukha 'martyrs of Sikh nation' and added that Jinda and Sukha took revenge of Operation Blue Star.
