= Chillar =

Village in Rewari district, Haryana, India

Chillar, Rewari
- Location within Haryana Location within India
- Coordinates: 28.267157°N 76.681706°E
- Country: India

Government
  - Body: Village panchayat

Population (2011)
  - Total: 3,089
- Time zone: UTC+5:30 (IST)
- PIN: 122502
- Website: www.rewari.gov.in

Chillar is a village in Rewari district, Haryana, India, formerly in Gurgaon Division. It is on the Rewari-Pataudi road 15.5 kilometres (9.6 mi) north of Rewari. It is 318 kilometres (198 mi) from the state capital of Chandigarh. Its postal head office is at Khalilpur. It is surrounded by Pataudi Tehsil to the east, Jatusana Tehsil to the west, Farrukh Nagar Tehsil to the north, and Bawal Tehsil to the south.

== Etymology and origin ==
=== Early findings ===
==== Caste background ====
According to rural gazetteer of Delhi, the village lies between Upper Doab boundaries of westernmost frontier province of Rewari near the feudatory settlement of Phulkian Sardars of Jat-Sikh household at Mahendragarh subsiding the Bagri region whose founding stone was laid by Jattki or Jutt girl who was episodically separated from Dalal Sikh-Jatha.

== Demographics of 2011 ==
As of 2011 India census, Chillar had a population of 3089 in 609 households. Males (1597) constitute 51.69% of the population and females (1492) 48.3%. Chillar has an average literacy (2189) rate of 70.86%, lower than the national average of 74%: male literacy (1272) is 58.1%, and female literacy (917) is 41.89% of total literates (2189). In Chillar, Rewari, 12.91% of the population is under 6 years of age (399).

== See also ==
- Hondh-Chillar massacre
- Chillar (surname)
- Dalal
