= Sukhdev Singh Sukha =

Sikh militant and convicted assassin (1962–1992)

- Born: 14 August 1962; Sri Ganganagar, Rajasthan, India
- Died: 9 October 1992 (aged 30); Pune, Maharashtra, India
- Cause of death: Execution by hanging
- Status: Executed
- Conviction: Assassination of Arun Shridhar Vaidya
- Penalty: Death

Sukhdev Singh Sukha (14 August 1962 – 9 October 1992) was a Sikh militant and one of the two assassins of Indian Army general Arun Vaidya. He was responsible for three high-profile assassinations; Arjan Dass, Lalit Maken and Gen. Vaidya. He along with other members of Khalistan Commando Force participated in Indian history's biggest bank robbery of ₹ 57 million (1.023 billion rupees or US$12.5 million in 2023) from Punjab National Bank, Miller Gunj branch, Ludhiana to finance the militancy for a separate Sikh state of Khalistan.

== Early life ==
Sukha was born in 1962 on 14 Sawan, Wednesday, at Chak N: 11 FF, District Sri Ganganagar, Rajasthan, to Sikh family of Mengha Singh Banwait and Surjeet Kaur. His family originally belonged to village Bhungarni in Hoshiarpur district of Punjab who had relocated to Lyallpur District in undivided Punjab. It relocated to Chak N: 11 FF after the partition of India.

He did his early schooling from his native village and village 13 FF Manaksar. In 1983 he received his BA from Gyan Jyoti College in Karanpur and was studying in MA English when Operation Blue Star occurred. He left his studies and joined the Khalistan separatist movement.

== Assassinations ==
Harjinder Singh Jinda and Sukhdev Singh Sukha along with Ranjit Singh Gill gunned down Congress(I) Member of Parliament Lalit Maken on 31 July 1985, when he was moving towards his car parked across the road from his house in Kirti Nagar, New Delhi. The three assailants continued firing even as Maken ran towards his house for cover. Maken's wife Geetanjali and a visitor, Balkishan, were also caught in the firing. The assailants escaped on their Yamaha Motorcycles. Lalit Maken was considered to be involved in the killings of Sikhs during 1984 Anti-Sikh riots. In a 31-page booklet titled 'Who Are The Guilty', People's Union for Civil Liberties (PUCL) listed 227 people who led the mobs, which killed up to 3,000 Sikhs over three days. Lalit Maken's name was third on the list. Ranjit Singh "Gill" was arrested by Interpol in New Jersey, USA on 14 May 1987, he was deported back to India in May 1997 after lengthy legal cases and was sentenced to life imprisonment on 24 February 2003.

General Arun Vaidya was the Chief of the Indian Army who ordered the attack on armed militants holed up in the building of the Golden Temple, the holiest site of Sikhism, at Amritsar and elsewhere in Punjab during Operation Blue Star. He had moved to Pune after his retirement from the army. On 10 August 1986 Vaidya, the architect of Operation Blue Star was shot to death by Jinda and Sukha while he was driving his car home from the market. According to the police, the assailants pulled up next to his car on motor scooters and fired eight or nine shots into the car. Vaidya reportedly died instantly of head and neck wounds. His wife, who was also in the car, was wounded by four bullets in her back and thighs. According to Indian intelligence sources, Vaidya had been the number four assassination target on lists by Sikh militants and he was one of several people killed in retaliation for Operation Blue Star. Following the assassination, the Khalistan Commando Force issued a statement declaring that Vaidya had been killed in retaliation for the Golden Temple operation.

Congress (I) leader Arjan Dass was also assassinated by the duo because of his involvement in 1984 Anti-Sikh riots. Arjan Dass's name appeared in various affidavits submitted by innocent Sikh victims to Nanavati Commission which was headed by Justice G.T. Nanavati, retired judge of the Supreme Court of India.

== Arrest and death ==
On 17 September 1986, Sukha got into an accident with a truck in Pimpri, Pune and was arrested. He was riding the same black motorcycle which was used at the time of assassination of General Vaidya. Jinda got arrested at Gurdwara Majnoo Daa Tilla, Delhi in March 1987. He was shot in the legs at the time of his arrest. During their court trial, despite admitting to the killing, they pleaded not-guilty, justifying their actions by saying that Vaidya was "guilty of a serious crime, the punishment for which could only be death". They were awarded death sentences at 2:05 pm on 21 October 1989.

On 9 October 1992, early in the morning, Sukhdev Singh "Sukha" and Harjinder Singh "Jinda" were executed by hanging in Pune Jail. The Independent World mentioned "While being led from their cell to the gallows set up in the Yerawada gaol yard, the two convicted killers shouted slogans for Sikh independence in the Punjab". Both of them were hanged at 4 am in Yerwada Central Jail Pune while extraordinary security was deployed at the jail and in the periphery of Pune to oppose any possible Sikh militant attack. Security was also tightened all over Northern India. Their dead bodies were cremated on the same day at 6:20 am near Mula river.

=== Public protests ===
The Independent World reported that "..their hanging sparked off protests by students and shop-keepers in the Sikh-dominated state of Punjab" and "Security forces were put on alert in New Delhi, Pune, the southern city where the two assassins were hanged, and throughout the Punjab".

=== Memorial service and subsequent seizure of the Golden Temple by the government ===
On their memorial service, hundreds of troops and police surrounded the Golden Temple. In the early morning hundreds of Sikhs were ordered to move out of the Golden Temple. Sikh leaders Simranjit Singh Mann, Prakash Singh Badal, Gurcharan Singh Tohra and 300 others were arrested in the statewide arrests. Some people were baton charged when they tried to enter this religious place. Approximately 300 Sikhs openly resisted the police clampdown and held the 30-minute memorial service inside the complex while chanting slogans hailing the assassins and in support of Sikh homeland Khalistan. Jinda and Sukha's fathers were presented with saropa Sahib by Golden Temple priest. Police siege of the temple was lifted 3 hours after the memorial service.

== Honours/ anniversaries ==
In October 1999, his death anniversary was celebrated in village Gadli, district Amritsar, where chief of Akal Takhat Amritsar, Giani Puran Singh declared Jinda and Sukha as national martyrs while justifying their action of killing general Vaidya. Some Akali leaders stayed away from this function.

On 9 October 2000, representatives of all major Sikh bodies, including ruling Shiromani Akali Dal, the SHSAD, the SGPC, the Damdami Taksal, AISSF and the Dal Khalsa attended the eighth death anniversary of Harjinder Singh Jinda and Sukhdev Singh Sukha. To honour Jinda and Sukha, Giani Joginder Singh Vedanti, head of Akal Takht (Supreme Sikh temporal seat), performed the 'ardas' (a Sikh religious rite). Both Sukha and Jinda were declared as "great martyrs' of the Sikh nation during this event.

On 9 October 2002, Jinda's death anniversary, "Tributes were paid to the assassins of General Vaidya – Jinda and Sukhdev Singh Sukha" and Jinda's mother was honoured by Giani Joginder Singh Vedanti, chief of Akal Takhat.

In October 2005, his death anniversary was celebrated in his native village of Gadli by various Sikh organization including Dal Khalsa, Damdami Taksal, Akal Federation and Sikh Students Federation etc.

On 9 October 2008, Shiromani Gurdwara Prabandhak Committee honoured kin of Jinda and Sukha in the Golden Temple complex, to mark their death anniversary. SGPC declared Jinda and Sukha 'martyrs of Sikh Nation' and added that Jinda and Sukha took "revenge of" Operation Blue Star.

On 22 October 2008, the South Asian Post reported that the Dashmesh Durbar Sikh temple in Surrey, Canada had organized special prayers for both Jinda and Sukha in Canada.
