= Hondh-Chillar massacre =

1984 killing of Sikhs in Haryana, India

- Location: 28°16′47″N 76°39′7″E; Hondh, Chillar, Haryana, India
- Date: 2 November 1984
- Perpetrator: Mob of 200-250 persons

The Hondh-Chillar massacre (Note: The village was referred to as "Hojipur" in revenue records but as "Hondh" by the residents. Rural villages in Northern India typically have two to three names. Hondh was a "dhani", or cluster of farmhouses, outside the main village of Chillar.) (Punjabi: ਹੋਂਦ-ਚਿੱਲੜ ਕਤਲੇਆਮ [hɔ́nd tʃɪlːəɾ kə̀lːuɡɑ̀ɾɑ]) refers to the killings of at least 32 Sikhs on 2 November 1984 in a hamlet in the Rewari district of Haryana, allegedly by a political mob during the 1984 anti-Sikh riots. The local police did not intervene in the massacre, pursue a first information report filed by survivors, or help resettle the survivors. The mass graves at the massacre were rediscovered in January 2011. A similar massacre occurred in nearby Pataudi.

== Background ==
During the Partition of India, Hondh was settled by 16 Sikh families who migrated from Daultala and Kallar Syedan of Pakistan. The families were reportedly of Sikh Rajput heritage. The families often belonged to clans like the Nagyal or Bhatti. Hondh was a "dhani" (hamlet), outside the main village of Chillar. The families were influential and before the massacre the Sarpanch (village head) of Chillar had been one of the residents of Hondh.

After the October 1984 Assassination of Indira Gandhi, thousands of Sikhs were killed in the 1984 Anti-Sikh pogroms by Congress (I) party workers' mobs being aided by government officials who provided "trucks and state buses" as well as "weapons-including oil, kerosene, and other flammable materials". at 10 AM on 2 November, a truck and a bus carrying "200-250" Congress young men arrived at the village. They began attacking the Sikhs armed with rods, lathis, diesel, kerosene, and matches as well as chanting slogans in favor of the Congress (I) party. For four hours the Congress members mob beat to death and burned alive 31 Sikh villagers. They continued to burn down the Sikhs' bungalows and gurdwara until the villagers who were able to escape the initial attack tried to find shelter in three different houses. The mob then set two of the houses on fire by pouring kerosene through the roof. One villager, Balwant Singh, retaliated by killing one of the rioters with a sword and another group of villagers ran out of their burning house to fight back. Once the villagers started fighting back the massacre "came to an abrupt halt".

On the night of 2 November, the 32 surviving Sikhs found shelter in a nearby village. Under the cover of night they escaped to Rewari in a tractor-trolley. The survivors now reside in Ludhiana and Bathinda in Punjab

A FIR was filed by Dhanpat Singh, the then Sarpanch of Chillar at police station Jatusana in Mahendragarh district, which is now in Rewari district. It reveals the killers first came from Hali Mandi (Note: Also referred to as Haily Mandi. It is right next to Pautadi.) around 11 AM but were persuaded by the villagers to turn around. When they came in the evening they had several more trucks of reinforcements and a group of three Hindus had tried to persuade the killers to leave the village but were intimidated into leaving. It reports that 20 of the dead Sikh villagers' bodies were burned beyond recognition.

On 23 February 2011, the local police claimed to have lost the first information report, however The Times of India was able to find a signed copy of the report which had been obtained from the same police station just days earlier.

== Pataudi massacre ==
The media, the Sikh organizations, the politicians had all labeled the riots as the ‘Delhi riots’...We were scared and alone, what could we do? We did not have the time, resources or support to fight against the system. And to be honest, when you lose your whole world, your will to fight dies. -Survivor quoted by Tehelka

At 6 PM on 1 November 1984 after Indira Gandhi was shot, a mob under the guidance of Congress leader Lalit Maken set fire to Pataudi's gurdwara which created a panic in the town. As the armed mob rampaged through the town and set fire to Sikh homes in the city, one group of Sikhs escaped to the outskirts while another found shelter in a local ashram.

On 2 November, the Sikhs returned to the city to see the damage done to their homes. Left tired and crying in front of their homes, they became separated from each other, and at 10 AM the mob returned and began burning people alive. Many of the Sikhs were able to escape, but the Congress mob captured 17 of them, murdered them, and burned their remains to remove evidence.

Although the survivors filed multiple FIRs with the police, none of the assailants were captured or prosecuted. After the massacre many Sikh families fled and only five families remain out of thirty that were settled prior to the massacre.

== Rediscovery ==
On 22 January 2011, an engineer in Gurgaon, Haryana, Manwinder Singh Giaspura, struck up a conversation with a delivery boy who talked about a "deserted village of Sardars (Note: Sardar is a title commonly used for Sikhs in India.)" near his own village. When the boy began talking about arson, Giaspura realized he was talking about the 1984 anti-Sikh pogroms. The boy further told him that recently people had begun to steal wood and bricks from the site so on 23 January Giaspura drove to Chillar and found the site of the massacre. After seeing bones inside a building and quotations from the Guru Granth Sahib on the walls he realized the building was a gurdwara. Giaspura then uploaded "50–60" pictures of the village onto Facebook and sent appeals to various Punjabi language newspapers to investigate and preserve the site. After not receiving help from the SGPC, Giaspura contacted the All India Sikh Students Federation and Sikhs for Justice. On 13 March, the man who discovered the site of the massacre was asked to resign from his position as general manager of V&S International Pvt Ltd, allegedly for his role in exposing the massacre.

=== Reactions ===
On 2 March 2011 members of Akali Dal, the main Sikh political party in India, demanded that the Lok Sabha form a probe to look into the massacre.

Dal Khalsa (International) is attempting to appeal to United Nations officials in New Delhi to send a team to investigate. The American Gurdwara Parbandhak Committee organized a meeting with the U.S. State Department to discuss related human rights violations and legal action.

Sikhs for Justice has maintained that the 1984 anti-Sikh pogroms were an organized attempt at genocide and that government commissions set up to investigate them have purposely not investigated violence outside of Delhi to cover up systematic patterns of violence against Sikhs throughout India. In response to this discovery, the AISSF and Sikhs for Justice have established a trust to find other sites like Hondh-Chillar throughout India.

On 4 March, an ardās was held at the Akal Takht for the victims of the massacre.

On 12 March, Sikhs for Justice met with Director-General of UNESCO Irina Bokova in New York to discuss preserving the ruins as a heritage site. They also consulted with archeologists who had worked on Holocaust sites for advice.

== See also ==
- List of massacres in India
