= G. T. Nanavati =

Indian judge (1935–2021)

Girish Thakurlal Nanavati

14th Chief Justice of the Odisha High Court
- In office 31 January 1994 – 27 September 1994
- Preceded by: Banwari Lal Hansaria
- Succeeded by: Vallabhdas Aidan Mohta

Justice of the Supreme Court of India
- In office 6 March 1995 – 16 February 2000

Personal details
- Born: 17 February 1935 Jambusar, Gujarat, British Raj
- Died: 18 December 2021 (aged 86) Ahmedabad, Gujarat, India

Girish Thakurlal Nanavati (17 February 1935 – 18 December 2021) was a judge of the Supreme Court of India. After his retirement, he headed two commissions inquiring into the 1984 Anti-Sikh riots and the 2002 Godhra riots.

== Early life ==
Born in Jambusar, Gujarat, on 17 February 1935, Nanavati was the eldest of twelve children. In his family, his father, grandfather and uncle were all lawyers. Nanavati studied at St. Xaviers College in Mumbai. After finishing his education in the arts, he enrolled in the Government Law College in Mumbai to receive his bachelor's and master's degrees in law.

== Career ==
Nanavati enrolled as an advocate in the Bombay High Court in 1958. Circumstances forced him to return to Gujarat from Mumbai when the bifurcation of the Bombay state in 1960 left him a hard choice. His wish to practice at the prestigious Bombay High Court went unfulfilled and left for Ahmedabad.

His practice in Ahmedabad was very low key. He dealt with a smattering of revenue cases, but his true potential was realized when he began to practice criminal cases. He received and accepted an offer to become a public prosecutor in 1964, which became a turning point in the young man's career. At that time, high court judges, not the government, appointed prosecutors. This began a fifteen-year stint prosecuting cases before the high court.

He was appointed a permanent judge to the Gujarat High Court in 1979. Fourteen years later he was transferred to the high court in Orissa. A year later, in 1994, he was appointed chief justice of the High Court of Orissa. He was transferred again eight months later to the Karnataka High Court. In March 1995 he was appointed a judge to the Supreme Court of India by the Congress government. Judge Nanavati retired on 16 February 2000.

== Nanavati Commission ==
Nanavati was appointed by the National Democratic Alliance government to probe the 1984 Anti-Sikh riots. He was the sole member of the Nanavati commission. The commission incriminated Indian National Congress politicians Sajjan Kumar and Jagdish Tytler. Nanavati has stated that evidence indicated that it was a "lapse on part of the civil administration" not to call the Indian Army in a timely fashion, "resulting in large-scale rioting and loss of lives".

== Godhra riots ==
In March 2002, Judge Nanavati was appointed to head a two-man commission investigating the 2002 Godhra riots, replacing Judge K. G. Shah. Throughout the proceedings and in its final report of November 2014, the commission concluded that there had been no serious lapses by either the police, or the state administration in dealing with the riots. The report itself has yet to be made public.

== Personal life and death ==
Nanavati died from cardiac arrest on 18 December 2021, at the age of 86 at his home in Ahmedabad.
