= Rajahmundry Central Prison =

Prison in Andhra Pradesh, India

- Location in Andhra Pradesh Rajamahendravaram Central Prison (India)
- Location: Rajamahendravaram, India; 17.016357°N 81.790584°E
- Status: Operational
- Capacity: 1648
- Population: 1328 (5 July 2011)
- Opened: 1864
- Managed by: Director General of Prisons and Correctional Services, Government of Andhra Pradesh
- Website: http://apprisons.gov.in

Rajamahendravaram Central Prison is a prison located in Rajamahendravaram, Andhra Pradesh, India.

== History ==
In 1602, the Dutch constructed a fort in Rajamahendravaram. The British empire converted it into a jail in 1864, and then elevated it to a central jail in 1870. The jail is spread over 196 acres (79 ha) out of which the buildings occupy 37.24 acres (15.07 ha).

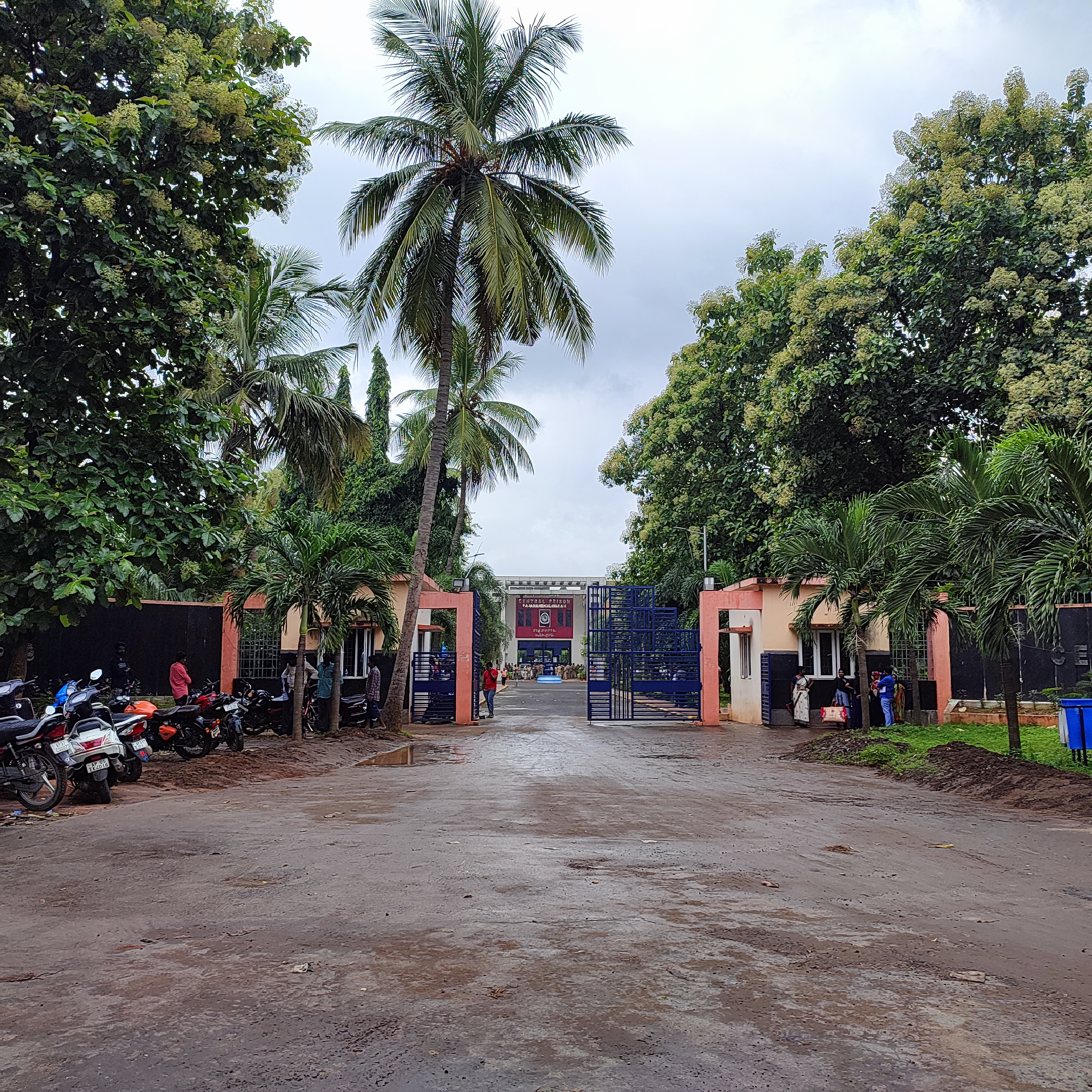
Rajahmundry Central Prison location

In 2012, a few lawmakers proposed shifting of the jail from its present location to a new site in Jaggampeta. As per the proposal, the existing property was to be utilised for public amenities. 20 acres of land was towards construction of a sport stadium, 120 acres for the new campus of Nannayya University, and rest of the land going towards providing housing for the poor. This proposal met with criticism from other lawmakers that represented this region.

== Facilities ==
The jail trains the convicts in making furniture and other crafts. In 2008, it was reported that the jail improved the literacy rate of its inmates. About 240 prisoners graduated from prison. The prison administration offers vocational courses and legal services to the prisoners. The inmates are allowed to sell fruits and vegetables while serving their time. On one occasion, they raised ₹1.74 million (US$18,000) through the sale proceeds.

In 2011, the University Grants Commission and a regional Gandhian Studies Centre began offering a three-month certificate course in Gandhian philosophy to the male prisoners of the jail. During the launch of this course, the jail authorities said that they placed priority on educating the prisoners. The jail also offers the opportunity for further education through the Andhra Pradesh Open University.

To improve the facilities at this prison, the central government sanctioned ₹200 million (US$2.1 million) for the renovation of central jail using funds from the thirteenth Finance Commission (2010–2015). The funds were planned to be utilised towards construction of a kitchen, a 100-bed hospital, barracks, and workshops.

== See also ==
- Department of Prisons of Government of Andhra Pradesh
