= Prayag Jha =

Indian artist (born 1945)

- Born: 15 March 1945 (age 81)
- Occupation: Artist

Prayag Jha Chillar, also known as Prayag Jha, is a contemporary Indian artist who specializes in etching. Her works are kept in collections all over India, including the National Gallery of Modern Art in the capital, New Delhi. Jha's work has been showcased in solo exhibitions from 1971 to 2012 across Jehangir Art Gallery, Taj Art Gallery, Bajaj Art Gallery, and Art Heritage New Delhi. Her work depicts scenes from the ancient Indian epic Meghdoot ("The Messenger Clouds") and is inspired by natural forms, such as grass and leaves. Jha's earlier works were primarily monochrome, but have evolved to include strong colors.

Jha won an international award at the 7th Triennial for her etching titled Bachelor's House. Other honors include State Level Awards and a National Award given to her by the President of India.

== Early life ==
Prayag was born in Agra, Uttar Pradesh on March 15, 1945. In 1971, she completed National Diploma in Fine Arts (Paintings) from the College of Art in New Delhi. She also completed a Post Diploma in graphic art in 1973 from the MS University of Baroda Faculty of Fine Arts. She was selected for a three-year senior fellowship from the Ministry of Human Resources and Development of India for the etching project on Kalidas Meghdoot from 1995 to 1997. Jha married the sculptor JK Chillar in July 1971, in New Delhi.

== Work ==
From 1973 to 1975, Jha worked as a freelance artist in Mumbai and made many pen drawings and etchings. Exhibitions of Jha's artworks are frequently held at the Art Heritage Gallery, National Gallery of Modern Art, and other galleries. Some of her notable works include Crows, The Bachelor's House, House without the Woman, In Front of the House, the Flight series, Scattered Life, and Alone. Crows appear in many of her works as a symbol of loneliness and desolation.

In 2007, eighty zinc plates with etchings of Meghdoot were stolen from her house by scrap metal thieves. The plates were never recovered.

== Recognition ==
- Vijoo Sadwelkar Award, 2003
- Excellence Award from Jehangir Art Gallery, 2003
- International Gold Medal Award in the 7th Triennale India (World Exhibition of Art with over 80 participating countries) making her the first Indian to ever receive this award in Graphic Arts, arranged by Lalit Kala Akademi New Delhi, 1991
- Maharashtra Gaurav Puraskar from the Government of Maharashtra in December 1990 at Mumbai
- National Award from the National Academy of Art arranged by Lalit Kala Akademi New Delhi, 1985
- 3 honours in Graphic Art from the Art Society of India, Bombay in 1976, 1978, 1988
- Second prize in Members Art Exhibition, held at Artist Center Bombay, 1976
- The only Art Critic Award in India, from Artist's Center of Bombay, 1974
- Three consecutive first prize honors in the Graphic Arts Annual Exhibition, held at Gujarat State Lalit Kala Akademi, Gandhi Nagar during 1971 to 1973

== Collections ==
- Lalit Kala Academy, New Delhi
- National Gallery of Modern Art, New Delhi & National Gallery of Modern Art, Mumbai
- Gujarat State Lalit Kala Academy, Gandhi Nagar
- UP State Lalit Kala Academy, Lucknow
- Academy of Fine Arts, Calcutta
- Sate Lalit Kala Academy, Hyderabad
- Chandigarh Museum
- College of Art, New Delhi
- Faculty of Fine Arts, Baroda
- Ministry of External Affairs, New Delhi
- Late Governor of Delhi Sri L J Jha
- Ex Sheriff of Bombay, S H Daya

== Art Jury ==
- Jury member on the National Art Exhibition arranged by National Lalit Kala Academy New Delhi (1992)
- Jury member for All India Exhibition of Art arranged by UP State Lalit Kala Academy at Lucknow (1995)
- Jury member for All India Exhibition of Art, Bombay Art Society (1994)
- Jury member for Maharashtra State Exhibition, Mumbai (1996)
- Jury member for All India Exhibition arranged by NZCC, Nagpur (1996)
