= Chillar (surname) =

Chillar is an Indian surname. Notable persons with the name include:

- Brandon Chillar (born 1982), American football linebacker
- Manjeet Chillar (born 1986), Indian kabaddi player
- Manushi Chhillar (born 1997), Indian model and beauty pageant titleholder
- Prayag Jha Chillar (born 1945), Indian artist
