= Nanavati Commission =

Indian government investigation into the 1984 anti-Sikh riots

The Justice G.T. Nanavati commission was a one-man commission headed by Justice G.T. Nanavati, a retired Judge of the Supreme Court of India, appointed by the National Democratic Alliance (NDA) government in May 2000, to investigate the "killing of innocent sikhs" during the 1984 anti-Sikh riots. The commission was mandated to submit its report within six months, but it took five years. The report in two volumes was completed in February 2005.

== Terms of Reference ==
Terms of Reference of the commission were: "(a) to inquire into the causes and course of the crimes and riots targeting members of the Sikh community which took place in the National Capital Territory of Delhi and other parts of the country on 31st October, 1984 and thereafter; (b) the sequence of the events leading to and all the facts relating to such violence and riots; (c) whether these heinous crimes could have been averted and whether there were any lapses or dereliction of duty in this regard on the part of any of the responsible authorities / individuals; (d) to inquire into the adequacy of the administrative measures taken to prevent and to deal with the said violence and riots; (e) to recommend measures which may be adopted to meet the ends of the justice; (f) to consider such matters as may be found relevant in the course of the inquiry."

== Focus ==
The commission report details accusations and evidence against senior members of the Delhi wing of the then ruling Congress Party, including Jagdish Tytler, later a Cabinet Minister, MP Sajjan Kumar and late minister H.K.L. Bhagat. They were accused of instigating mobs to avenge the assassination of Indira Gandhi by killing Sikhs in their constituencies. The report also held the then Lt. Governor PG Gavai for failing in his duty and late orders for controlling the riots. The commission also held the then Delhi police commissioner S.C. Tandon directly responsible for the riots.

== Aftermath ==
There was widespread protest against the report as it did not mention clearly the role of Tytler and other members of Congress Party in the 1984 anti-Sikh riots. The report led to the resignation of Jagdish Tytler from the Union Cabinet. A few days after the report was tabled in the Parliament, the Indian Prime Minister Manmohan Singh also apologised to the Sikh community for Operation Blue Star and the riots that followed. The report stated that Jagdish Tytler "very probably" had a hand in the riots.

The report had been lambasted by the Congress dominated United Progressive Alliance (UPA) government but the Bharatiya Janata Party (BJP) accepted the report and criticized the Congress party as "guilty".
