= Jagdish Tytler =

Indian politician (born 1944)

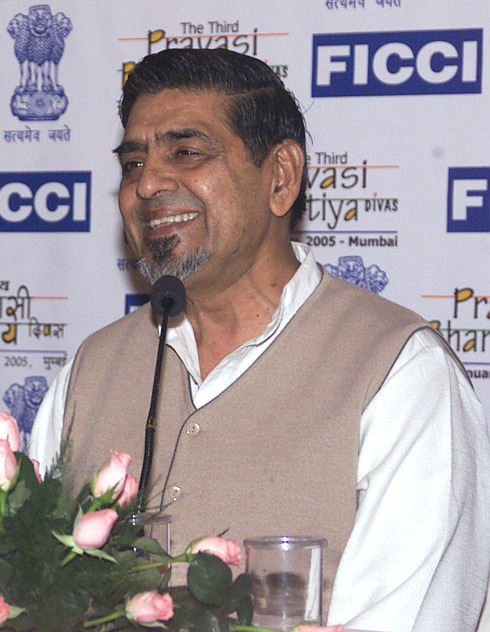
- Jagdish Tytler in 2005

Minister of State for Overseas Indian Affairs
- In office 1991 – 1996

Personal details
- Born: Jagdish Kapoor; 17 August 1944 (age 82) Gujranwala, Punjab, British India (now in Punjab, Pakistan)
- Party: Indian National Congress

Jagdish Tytler (born Jagdish Singh Kapoor; 17 August 1944) is an Indian politician and former Member of Parliament. He has held several government positions, the last being as Minister of State (Independent Charge) for Overseas Indian Affairs, a post from which he resigned after publication of a report by an official commission of inquiry, known as the Nanavati Commission.

The commission had noted that he "very probably" had a hand in organising attacks on the Sikh community in Delhi after Sikh bodyguards assassinated the Prime Minister, Indira Gandhi, during the 1984 anti-Sikh riots. He has not been charged with any crimes related to those riots. Currently he is serving as permanent committee member of Delhi Pradesh Congress Committee.

Due to the controversy concerning his involvement in the riots, the Congress party dropped his name as the candidate for the 2009 Lok Sabha elections.

== Early days ==
Tytler was born on 17 August 1944 as Jagdish Kapoor to a Hindu father and Sikh mother in the Punjabi family of Gujranwala in British India. He was brought up by the educationist James Douglas Tytler, the founder of many public schools including the Delhi Public School and the Summer Fields School. In 2011, his entry into the Jagannath Temple at Puri, which is reserved only for Hindus, caused questions about his religion, to be raised in the Odisha Legislative Assembly. Tytler denied having converted to Christianity, and stated that he had changed his name to show his gratitude towards James Douglas Tytler, who had brought him up.

As a member of Congress' youth organization he was first elected to the Lok Sabha in 1980. He served as a Union Minister first in the Civil Aviation department and then in the Labor department. He was re-elected in 1991 and served as the Union Minister of State for Surface Transport. In 2004, he was re-elected to the Lok Sabha.

== 1984 anti-Sikh riots ==
Tytler has been accused of involvement in the 1984 anti-Sikh riots in India, a charge that he denies. The riots had occurred after Sikh bodyguards assassinated Indian Prime Minister Indira Gandhi. Tytler stated that he was present at Teen Murti Bhavan for the funeral ceremony with Gandhi's body and was in mourning at the time when these events occurred at Gurudwara Pulbangash, situated near Azad Market. He has not been charged with any crimes related to the 1984 riots.

In April 2004, the Indian National Congress announced Jagdish Tytler as its candidates for Indian Parliament elections for constituencies in and around Delhi.

In 2019, Tytler said of the controversy surrounding the anti-Sikh riot accusations that

I do not understand why is this controversy. There were 5,000 people at the function, I was one of them. There is no FIR against me. CBI cleared me three times in its inquiry. You should ask the BJP if there is any FIR against me.

However, there is evidence he was involved in the murder of several innocent Sikh. Forty years after the 1984 anti-Sikh riots, a Delhi court in August 2024 framed charges for murder and other offences against Congress leader Jagdish Tytler in a case related to the killing of three people in north Delhi's Pul Bangash area. Special Judge Rakesh Siyal directed that Tytler face trial after he pleaded not guilty to the offences. The court had recorded the statement of Lakhvinder Kaur, widow of Badal Singh, who was killed in the violence. Another key witness in the case has also testified that Tytler was seen emerging from a white car in front of the gurdwara on November 1, 1984, and instigating the mob. “He came out of the car, raised slogans and provoked the mob against the Sikh community,” the witness had told the court. The court had framed charges against the senior Congress leader on September 13, 2023, under Sections 147 (rioting), 109 (abetment) read with 302 (murder) of the Indian Penal Code (IPC), among others.

=== Nanavati Commission ===
The report of the Nanavati Commission looking into the 1984 anti-Sikh riots said that Tytler "very probably" had a hand in organising the attacks. The then Congress-led Government of India, however, decided not to prosecute him or anyone else named in the report due to lack of concrete evidence.

Tytler, who had been appointed minister of state with independent charge of non-resident affairs, claimed innocence, saying that it was a case of mistaken identity. He said he had not been in the area at the time and that eight earlier commissions of inquiry had exonerated him. On 10 August 2005, he resigned from the Union Council of Ministers, stating that it was his "moral duty" to do so to prevent opposition parties making political capital out of the situation following release of the Nanavati report.

=== Defamation allegations ===
In 2004, lawyer H. S. Phoolka filed a case in the Ludhiana court against Tytler, accusing Tytler of defaming him during a television programme in the same year. Tytler had claimed that Phoolka is making money by blackmailing people. In 2014, Phoolka declined an "unconditional apology" from Tytler as a proposed settlement. The court framed charges against Tytler in 2015. As of July 2018, no verdict had been reached.

=== Reopening of the case in 2007 ===
India's Central Bureau of Investigation (CBI) closed all cases against Tytler in November 2007 for his alleged criminal conspiracy to engineer riots against Sikhs in the aftermath of Indira Gandhi's assassination on 31 October 1984. The CBI submitted a report to the Delhi court which stated that no evidence or witness had been found to corroborate the allegations of instigating crowd during riot against Tytler.

On 18 December 2007, the Additional Chief Metropolitan Magistrate of Delhi court, Sanjeev Jain, who had earlier dismissed the case after the CBI's report to his court, ordered the CBI to reopen cases against Tytler relating to the riots.

=== Clean chit by CBI ===
In March 2009, the CBI filed its final report on investigation into the riots cases and cleared Jagdish Tytler. The BJP which was then in opposition alleged that "such a clean chit ahead of the elections" implied that the CBI had been misused. On 2 April, CBI claimed there was lack of sufficient evidence against Tytler and sought to close the riot case.

On 7 April 2009, the then Home Minister, P. Chidambaram, had a shoe thrown at him by Jarnail Singh, a Sikh journalist, during a press conference in Delhi. Singh, who works at the Hindi daily Dainik Jagran, was dissatisfied with Chidambaram's answer to a question about the "clean chit" given to Tytler.

In 2010, CBI reiterated the clean chit to Tytler.

=== Denial of Lok Sabha ticket ===
After the shoe throwing incident, the Congress party dropped both Tytler and Sajjan Kumar as Congress candidates for the Lok Sabha elections of 2009. Tytler accused the media of victimizing him through a media trial. Tytler blamed the Shiromani Akali Dal and his "enemies" within the Congress party for scuttling his nomination.

=== Reiteration of CBI clean chit in 2010 ===
In February 2010, at a Delhi court before Additional Chief Metropolitan Magistrate Rakesh Pandit, the CBI concluded its arguments stating that the witness’ statements were "false and concocted", CBI supported its closure report that gave a clean chit to Tytler in the riots case. The CBI prosecutor stated that "The version of (witness) Jasbir Singh is absolutely false and concocted. He has made statements with an intention to falsely implicate Tytler." CBI had examined another witness Surender Singh and his family members who stated that the statements of the witness were not correct. CBI had produced a CD before the court to prove that Tytler was not at the location of riot but was present at the residence of Indira Gandhi.

=== CBI Closure reports and Court decisions to continue CBI Probes ===
In April 2013, a Sessions Court rejected the CBI report and ordered investigation against Tytler. Witnesses in the subsequent investigation have included Abhishek Verma and Amitabh Bachchan.

CBI filed its third closure report in 2014 (earlier closure reports were filed in 2007 and 2009). However Delhi's Karkardooma courts rejected the third CBI closure report on 4 December 2015, due to protest petition by Lakhwinder Kaur, and asked the CBI to continue its probe.

In 2016, CBI questions Tytler for 4 hours.

=== Advocate HS Phoolka's resolve ===
Senior advocate and activist HS Phoolka, who has strived to seek punishment for the accused in the 1984 anti-Sikh riots claimed in 2016 that CBI is shielding Jagdish Tytler, and that Akali Dal-BJP government is doing everything possible to protect Tytler. He stated on 4 December 2019 that "After sending Sajjan Kumar to prison, I will now ensure to send Kamal Nath and Tytler to jail."

=== Akali Dal's Proposed Resolution for Tytler's arrest in Punjab Assembly ===
In November 2021, the Shirimani Akali Dal president Sukhbir Singh that his party will move a resolution in the upcoming Punjab Assembly session seeking Tytler's arrest. Responding to that Sajjan Singh Verma, Congress MLA from Sonkatch commented that "SAD does not have faith in court. It tries to become judge and pronounce judgement".

=== Personal life ===
He is married to Jennifer, daughter of a Scottish mother and an Irish father, born in Delhi, who is the principal of the J D Tytler School. They have a son, Siddhartha and a daughter. His son Siddhartha is a fashion designer.

Jagdish Tytler was raised by a Christian minister, however he identifies himself as a Hindu. In 2011 his visit to the Jagannath Puri temple created a controversy because non-Hindus are prohibited from entering the temple. Tytler claimed that he is a Hindu and had visited the Puri temple four times in the past.
