= Lalit Maken =

Indian politician

Member of Parliament, Lok Sabha
- In office 1984 – 31 July 1985
- Preceded by: Charanjit Singh Atwal
- Succeeded by: Arjun Singh
- Constituency: South Delhi

Personal details
- Born: 16 October 1951
- Died: 31 July 1985 (aged 33) Kirti Nagar, West Delhi, India
- Cause of death: Assassination by shooting
- Party: Indian National Congress
- Spouse: Gitanjali Maken
- Relations: Shankar Dayal Sharma (Father in Law); Ajay Maken (Nephew)
- Children: Avantika Maken

Lalit Maken (16 October 1951 – 31 July 1985) was a Member of parliament, a political leader of the Indian National Congress and a labour union leader. Maken was the son-in-law of former President of India, Shankar Dayal Sharma.

In 1984, he was elected to the Lok Sabha as a directly elected MP from South Delhi constituency of India until his assassination in 1985. He was a metropolitan Councillor prior to his election to Parliament.

== Death ==
Maken and his wife, Gitanjali (daughter of the future president Shankar Dayal Sharma), were shot dead by Bhai Sukhwinder Singh Shindu aka KC Sharma, Sukhdev Singh Sukha and Ranjit Singh Kukki Gill alias Kukki for his alleged involvement in riots outside Maken's Kirti Nagar residence in West Delhi on 31 July 1985. Lalit was shot while he was moving towards his car parked across the road from his house in Kirti Nagar, New Delhi. All three assailants continued firing even as Maken ran towards his house for cover. Gitanjali and a visitor, Balkishan, were also caught in the firing. Gitanjali died on her way to the hospital. The assailants escaped on scooters. Lalit, Gitanjali and Balkishen were taken to All India Institute of Medical Sciences, New Delhi. The postmortem examinations were conducted by a team of doctors headed by T.D. Dogra.

Police later arrested Sukhdev Singh Sukha in 1986 and Harjinder Singh Jinda in 1987. Both of them were later sentenced to death for the murder of Indian Army general Arun Shridhar Vaidya (architect of Operation Blue Star) and on 9 October 1992 they were hanged in Yerwada Central Jail in Pune in the Indian state of Maharashtra. As per an Indian request, Ranjit Singh "Gill" was arrested by Interpol in New Jersey, USA on 14 May 1987. A federal magistrate approved his extradition on 6 February 1988 after he requested to go back home (the request was earlier denied thrice) and he was deported back to India in February 2000 after lengthy legal cases and was sentenced to life imprisonment on 24 February 2003. His sentence was commuted on 20 May 2009.

== Family ==
Former Minister of Youth Affairs and Sports, Government of India, Ajay Maken is his nephew. His only child (daughter), Avantika Maken married Suchiter Sharma in 1997. Later, she filed for divorce and married Ashok Tanwar in 2005, former President of the Indian Youth Congress and Member of Parliament.

Both Ajay Maken and Avantika Maken had requested the early release of Lalit Maken's killer Ranjit Singh Gill.
