= Kirti Nagar =

- Neighborhood of Delhi
- Location in Delhi, India
- Coordinates: 28.6504°N 77.1444°E
- Country: India
- State: Delhi
- District: West Delhi

Languages
  - Official: Hindi
- Time zone: UTC+5:30 (IST)
- Planning agency: MCD

Kirti Nagar is a neighborhood in Delhi, India. Kirti Nagar is a home to Hindu and Sikh refugees in India, who migrated from Pakistan after the partition of India in 1947. It came up on the lands of the former Basai Darapur village.

Kirti Nagar has a huge residential market consisting of General Stores, Chemists, Aesthetic skin clinic, Salons and many Banks.

Considered one of the upmarket areas in Delhi, the twin localities of Mansarovar Garden and Kirti Nagar are indeed one of the posh areas in West Delhi. The colony mostly consists of private houses and "Kothis", housing rich businessmen and Bhappa Sikhs who migrated from Pakistan after the partition of India constitute a significant part of the population.

The adjacent neighborhood of Rajouri Garden is a popular market, comprising the Main Market, Nehru Market and many western style indoor shopping malls including TDI Mall, Moments mall, TDI Paragon Mall, Shoppers Stop, City Square, West Gate Mall, and Paradise Mall. Together, this area is now the largest single locality shopping conglomeration in Delhi ahead of South Delhi.

Kirti Nagar is well connected to the Delhi Metro via the Kirti Nagar station, which is one of the few Metro stations with a feeder bus service. Mansarovar Garden and Kirti Nagar localities are adjacent to the Ring Road on one side and Patel Road on the other which connect to Dhaula Kuan and the Central Business District of Connaught Place, respectively.

Surrounding areas to Kirti Nagar are Ramesh Nagar, Mansarovar Garden, Rajouri Garden, Punjabi Bagh and Patel Nagar.
