= Arun Shridhar Vaidya =

Chief of the Army Staff (India) from 1983 to 1986

General Arun Shridhar Vaidya PVSM, MVC **, AVSM, ADC
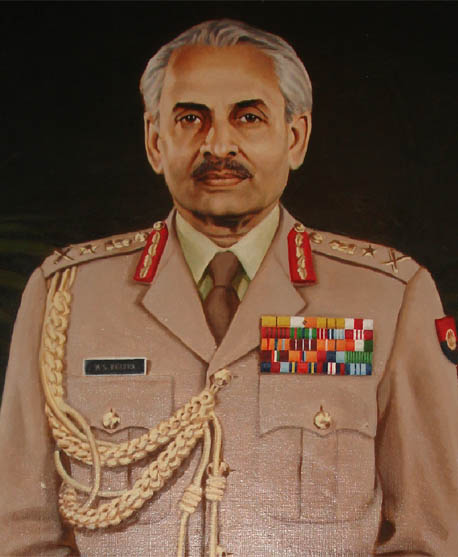

27th Chairman of the Chiefs of Staff Committee
- In office 1 December 1984 – 31 January 1986
- President: Zail Singh
- Prime Minister: Rajiv Gandhi
- Preceded by: O. S. Dawson
- Succeeded by: R. H. Tahiliani

12th Chief of the Army Staff
- In office 1 August 1983 – 31 January 1986
- President: Mohammad Hidayatullah (acting); Zail Singh (acting)
- Prime Minister: Indira Gandhi; Rajiv Gandhi
- Preceded by: K. V. Krishna Rao
- Succeeded by: Krishnaswamy Sundarji

Personal details
- Born: 27 July 1926 Alibag, Kolaba District, Bombay Presidency, British India (now in Raigad District, Maharashtra, India)
- Died: 10 August 1986 (aged 60) Pune, Maharashtra, India
- Cause of death: Assassination (gunshot wounds)

Military service
- Allegiance: British India; India
- Branch/service: British Indian Army; Indian Army
- Years of service: 1944–1986
- Rank: General
- Unit: 9th Deccan Horse
- Commands: Eastern Army; IV Corps; 1st Armoured Division; 16 (Independent) Armoured Brigade; Deccan Horse
- Battles/wars: Second World War; Burma Campaign; Sino-Indian War; Indo-Pakistani War of 1965; Indo-Pakistani War of 1971; Battle of Basantar; Operation Blue Star
- Service number: IEC-11597 (emergency commission); IC-1701 (regular commission)
- Awards: Padma Vibhushan (posthumous); Param Vishisht Seva Medal; Maha Vir Chakra (Bar); Ati Vishisht Seva Medal

General Arunkumar Shridhar Vaidya PVSM, MVC & Bar, AVSM, ADC (27 July 1926 – 10 August 1986) was an Indian Army general. He served as the 12th Chief of the Army Staff from 1983 to 1986. Following his retirement, he was assassinated by Harjinder Singh Jinda and Sukhdev Singh Sukha in August 1986, for his role in Operation Blue Star in 1984.

== Family and early life ==
Vaidya was born in Bombay on 27 July 1926 to a Chandraseniya Kayastha Prabhu (CKP) family, the son of Shridhar Balkrishna Vaidya CIE, a barrister and sometime district collector of Surat, and his wife Indira. After his early education at New English School Ramanbaug, Pune, Vaidya studied at Elphinstone High School in Bombay before joining Elphinstone College and later the M. T. B. Arts College at Surat, presumably transferring due to his father's posting there as district collector.

At Elphinstone College, Vaidya joined the 1st Bombay Battalion of the University Training Corps (UTC) and was awarded Best Cadet in 1942 before transferring to the MTB College, where he also joined its UTC and attained the rank of Company Quarter-Master Havildar (CQMH). On 30 March 1944, he joined the Officers' Training School at Belgaum as a cadet. He was selected for the Armoured Corps and underwent further training at Ahmednagar, receiving an emergency commission in the Royal Deccan Horse (later the 9th Deccan Horse) of the British Indian Army on 20 January 1945. Vaidya fought in the Burma Campaign with the 14th Army during the final months of the Second World War, including at the battles of Meiktila and Rangoon.

His wife's name was Bhanu and they had three daughters.

== Military career ==
=== Early army career ===
Vaidya received an emergency commission in the Indian Armoured Corps on 20 October 1945, with the service number IEC-11597, and received a regular army commission as a lieutenant on 7 May 1947 (seniority from 20 April 1947), a few months before India's independence.

=== Post-Independence ===
In September 1948, Vaidya was involved in Operation Polo as a member of the ad hoc armoured force organised from the Armoured Corps Centre and School. The force captured the Daulatabad Fort, the Ellora Caves area and Parbhani. In 1958, he was selected to attend the Defence Services Staff College, Wellington, having secured a competitive vacancy. He was subsequently appointed brigade major of the 70 Infantry Brigade. He served in this appointment in Ladakh during the Sino-Indian War in 1962.

=== 1965 Indo-Pakistani war ===
Vaidya was promoted lieutenant-colonel on 10 June 1965, shortly before war broke out between India and Pakistan that year. He was in command of the Deccan Horse. During the time, he was instrumental in saving the Command Trucks and fleeing Divisional Headquarters through his tanks through an encirclement by Pakistan Army's 6th Armoured Division at the Battle of Chawinda which resulted in destruction of Pakistan's 1st Armoured Division and heavy loss of Pakistani lives. 70 tanks were destroyed of which 38 tanks were decimated by the Deccan Horse. The regiment won 22 gallantry awards and Vaidya as the Commandant was awarded India's second highest military decoration, the Maha Vir Chakra (MVC). He was awarded the MVC in an investiture ceremony at the Rashtrapati Bhavan by the President of India Sarvepalli Radhakrishnan on 21 April 1966.

==== Maha Vir Chakra Citation ====
The citation for the Maha Vir Chakra reads as follows:

Gazette Notification: 9 Pres/66,1-1-66

Operation: Date of Award: 16 September 1965

CITATION

LIEUTENANT COLONEL ARUNKUMAR SHRIDHAR VAIDYA (IC-1701)

THE DECCAN HORSE (9th HORSE)

Lieutenant Colonel Arun Shridhar Vaidya was in command of Deccan Horse in the series of actions fought by his unit from the 6 to 11 September 1965 in Asal Uttar and Cheema (Punjab) in the operations against Pakistan.

In the battle he showed inspiring leadership and remarkable resourcefulness in organising his unit and fighting against heavy odds and inflicted severe casualties on the Patton tanks of the enemy.

With untiring effort he moved from sector to sector with complete disregard for his personal safety thereby inspiring his troops by his personal example. He was instrumental to a large extent in stemming thrusts by enemy armour in the battle of Asal Uttar and later at Cheema and delivered effective blows to the enemy tanks on 10–11 September.

=== Between the wars ===
On 21 July 1969, he was promoted to the rank of Brigadier and appointed Commander of 167 Mountain Brigade. Under him, the brigade conducted operations against the Naga hostiles who were backed by China. Along with the leader, Mowu Angami, most of the hostiles were captured with their weapons and equipment. Vaidya was awarded the Ati Vishisht Seva Medal on 26 January 1970. On 2 November 1970, he was appointed Commandant of the Armoured Corps Centre and School at Ahmednagar.

=== 1971 Indo-Pakistani war ===
During the Indo-Pakistani War of 1971, Vaidya was in command of an armored brigade in the Zafarwal sector on the western front. In the Battle of Chakra and Dahira, the hostile terrain was combined with minefields. He crossed through the minefield and moved forward. Thus the entire squadron was able to push through the lane and quickly deploy itself to meet the Pakistan Army's counter-attacks.

During the Battle of Basantar (known as Battle of Barapind in Pakistan) in the same conflict, he displayed skill and leadership in getting his tanks through deep minefields. For this he was awarded a second Maha Vir Chakra (known as the Bar to MVC).

==== Bar to Maha Vir Chakra Citation ====
The citation for the bar to the Maha Vir Chakra reads as follows:

Gazette Notification: 22 Pres/72,12-2-72

Operation: 1971 Date of Award: 05 December 1971

CITATION

BRIGADIER ARUNKUMAR SHRIDHAR VAIDYA, MVC, AVSM (IC-1701)
Brigadier Arun Shridhar Vaidya was commander of an armoured brigade in the Zafanval sector during the operations against Pakistan on the Western Front. He moved his brigade swiftly to get to grips with the enemy, and took the enemy tanks by surprise. He employed his tanks relentlessly and aggressively and helped the division to maintain constant pressure and momentum of advance against the enemy. In the battle of Chakra and Dehira, the going was difficult due to deep minefield and terrain. In a cool and confident manner, Brigadier Vaidya undertook the crossing through the minefield. He personally moved forward, disregarding personal safety. Through his inspired leadership, the entire squadron pushed through the lane and quickly deployed itself to meet the enemy's counter-attacks. During the battle of Basantar he again displayed his professional skill and superb leadership. He got his tanks through one of the deepest minefields, expanded the bridgehead and repulsed a strong enemy counter attack. In this battle, 62 enemy tanks were destroyed.

Throughout, Brigadier Vaidya displayed outstanding courage, great professional skill, indomitable will, foresight and imagination in fighting against the enemy in keeping with the best traditions of the Army.

=== Post-war career ===
On 4 January 1973, Vaidya was promoted to the acting rank of major-general and appointed General Officer Commanding (GOC) the elite 1st Armoured Division. He was confirmed in the substantive rank of major-general on 1 April 1974. He subsequently moved to Army Headquarters as Director Military Operations (DMO). After a stint as DMO, he took over as the Master General of Ordnance at Army HQ.

Vaidya was promoted to lieutenant-general on 25 January 1980, with seniority from 16 August 1978. On 1 July 1980, he was appointed GOC IV Corps. He was also elected as Honorary ADC to the President of India. After a short tenure, he was promoted to Army Commander and appointed General Officer Commanding-in-Chief Eastern Command on 3 May 1981.

=== Chief of Army Staff ===
On 31 July 1983, Vaidya became the 13th Chief of Army Staff of the Indian Army, taking over from General K.V. Krishna Rao. The appointment was subject to controversy as the senior-most general, Lt. Gen. S K Sinha was superseded. Sinha was the Vice Chief of the Army Staff and was being groomed to take over as the next Chief. With the appointment of Vaidya as the 13th COAS, Sinha resigned in protest.

=== Operation Blue Star ===
In 1984, Vaidya designed and supervised Operation Blue Star – a military operation ordered by Indira Gandhi, then Prime Minister of India, against militants commanded by Shabeg Singh, a former Major General of the Indian Army, under Jarnail Singh Bhindranwale, Chief of Damdami Taksal, in June 1984 at the Shri Harmandir Sahib complex. Vaidya commanded a military operation which resulted in Bhindranwale being killed and the militants being cleared out of the Golden temple premises. During the operation hundreds of civilians were also killed and the Akal Takht was heavily damaged.

He retired on 31 January 1986, one of India's most decorated officers. He had completed over 40 years of service.

== Death ==
As the principal organiser of Operation Blue Star, Vaidya was well aware of being a high-profile target for assassins, but never regretted his role, stating in a 1985 interview-

"I do not see any difference in taking up arms against a foreign enemy or an enemy from within...one who takes up arms against his own brother-citizens, against his own Constitution and legally-constituted government is enemy enough, deserving the most ruthless punishment."

Following Vaidya's retirement, he took up residence in Pune, India, where he built a three-bedroom bungalow for his retirement. Just six months later, on 10 August 1986, he was shot dead in his car while driving home from the market on Rajendrasinhji Marg, at around 11:45 a.m. According to police, four reportedly clean-shaven men pulled up alongside the car on motorcycles, with the lead assassin firing three shots into Vaidya through the driver's-side window; the first two bullets penetrated his brain and killed him instantly. His car steered towards a cyclist named Digamber Gaikwad, and the cycle was crushed, though the cyclist escaped unharmed, the general's car stopping in front of a compound wall. A third bullet struck Vaidya in the shoulder, with another striking his wife Bhanumati in the neck. His bodyguard, who was also in the car, was wounded by four bullets in his back and thighs. The bleeding general was carried to the Command Hospital in a passing green matador van, and was declared brought dead. The witnesses who deposed in court said that the assailants were clean shaven, but later in turban and beard in court.

=== Aftermath ===
According to Indian intelligence sources, Vaidya had been the number four assassination target on lists of Sikh militants as he was one of several people killed in retaliation for Operation Blue Star. Vaidya was cremated in Pune with full military honours; in attendance were his wife, daughters Nita Kochhar, Parijat Belliappa and Tarini Vaidya, Union ministers V.P. Singh, V.N. Gadgil and Arun Singh, the three service chiefs, Governor of Maharashtra Shankar Dayal Sharma and Chief Minister of Maharashtra S.B. Chavan, along with over 50,000 other mourners.

Following the assassination, the Khalistan Commando Force issued a statement declaring that Vaidya had been killed in retaliation for the Golden Temple operation. The assassination shocked India, and security measures for senior military commanders, particularly for those who had taken part in Blue Star, were immediately stepped up. Local anti-Sikh rioting broke out in Pune and Mumbai after Vaidya's assassination; a number of people were stabbed and several Sikh-owned businesses were attacked.

In 1989, Sukhdev Singh Sukha and Harjinder Singh Jinda were sentenced to death for the killing. Despite admitting to the killing, they pleaded not-guilty, justifying their actions by stating that Vaidya was "guilty of a serious crime, the punishment for which could only be death". The two were executed on 9 October 1992.

== Honours and awards ==

Padma Vibhushan (posthumous)
Param Vishisht Seva Medal	Maha Vir Chakra(Bar)	Ati Vishist Seva Medal	Wound Medal
General Service Medal 1947	Samanya Seva Medal	Samar Seva Star	Paschimi Star
Raksha Medal	Sangram Medal	Sainya Seva Medal	Indian Independence Medal
25th Anniversary of Independence Medal	30 Years Long Service Medal	20 Years Long Service Medal	9 Years Long Service Medal
1939–1945 Star	Burma Star	War Medal: 1939–1945	India Service Medal

== Dates of rank ==
Insignia	Rank	Component	Date of rank
	Second Lieutenant	British Indian Army	20 January 1945 (emergency); 20 October 1945 (substantive)
	Lieutenant	British Indian Army	7 May 1947 (seniority from 20 April)
	Lieutenant	Indian Army	15 August 1947 (Note: Upon independence in 1947, India became a Dominion within the British Commonwealth of Nations. As a result, the rank insignia of the British Army, incorporating the Tudor Crown and four-pointed Bath Star ("pip"), was retained, as George VI remained Commander-in-Chief of the Indian Armed Forces. After 26 January 1950, when India became a republic, the President of India became Commander-in-Chief, and the Ashoka Lion replaced the crown, with a five-pointed star being substituted for the "pip.")
	Lieutenant	Indian Army	26 January 1950 (recommissioning and change in insignia)
	Captain	Indian Army	20 October 1951
	Major	Indian Army	20 October 1958
	Lieutenant-Colonel	Indian Army	10 June 1965
	Colonel	Indian Army	12 July 1968
	Brigadier	Indian Army	21 July 1969
	Major General	Indian Army	4 January 1973 (acting); 1 April 1974 (substantive)
	Lieutenant-General	Indian Army	25 January 1980 (seniority from 16 August 1978)
	General (COAS)	Indian Army	31 July 1983

== Notes ==
Military offices
Preceded by Oscar Stanley Dawson	Chairman of the Chiefs of Staff Committee; 1 December 1984 – 31 January 1986	Succeeded by Radhakrishna Hariram Tahiliani
Preceded by Kotikalapudi Venkata Krishna Rao	Chief of Army Staff; 1983–1986	Succeeded by Krishnaswamy Sundarji
Preceded by E A Vas	General Officer-Commanding-in-Chief Eastern Command; 1981–1983	Succeeded by K Chiman Singh
