= Who Are The Guilty =

Who are the Guilty is a report published by political scientist Rajni Kothari of Delhi-based organisation People's Union For Civil Liberties and Gobinda Mukhoty of People's Union for Democratic Rights. The report was issued in November 1984 after conducting investigations into widespread murder, looting and rioting during the 1984 anti-Sikh riots.
