= Elections in Delhi =

Overview of the procedure of elections in the National Capital Territory of Delhi

Elections in Delhi, the National Capital Territory of India are conducted in accordance with the Constitution of India. The Assembly of Delhi creates laws regarding the conduct of local body elections unilaterally while any changes by the state legislature to the conduct of state level elections needs to be approved by the Parliament of India. In addition, the state legislature may be dismissed by the Parliament according to Article 356 of the Indian Constitution and President's rule may be imposed.

== Main political parties ==
The Aam Aadmi Party (AAP), Indian National Congress (INC) and Bharatiya Janata Party (BJP) are the major political parties in Delhi. The Bharatiya Janata Party (BJP) currently rules as the majority elected party in Delhi Legislative Assembly elections. In the past, various parties such as Bharatiya Jana Sangh (BJS), Janata Party (JP) and Bahujan Samaj Party (BSP) were also influential in the territory.

== Lok Sabha elections ==
Keys: INC (52) BJP (48) BJS (6) JP (8) KMPP (1) JD (1)

Election Year	Winners											
Election Year	Total	Delhi City	New Delhi	Outer Delhi	Chandni Chowk	Delhi Sadar	Karol Bagh	East Delhi	South Delhi	West Delhi	North West Delhi	North East Delhi
1952	INC: 3 & KMPP: 1	KMPP	INC	INC	Not Exist	Not Exist	Not Exist	Not Exist	Not Exist	Not Exist	Not Exist	Not Exist
1952	INC: 3 & KMPP: 1	KMPP	INC	INC	Not Exist	Not Exist	Not Exist	Not Exist	Not Exist	Not Exist	Not Exist	Not Exist
1957	INC: 5	Not Exist	INC	INC	INC	INC	Not Exist	Not Exist	Not Exist	Not Exist	Not Exist	Not Exist
1957	INC: 5	Not Exist	INC	INC	INC	INC	Not Exist	Not Exist	Not Exist	Not Exist	Not Exist	Not Exist
1962	INC: 5	Not Exist	INC	INC	INC	INC	INC	Not Exist	Not Exist	Not Exist	Not Exist	Not Exist
1967	BJS: 6 & INC: 1	Not Exist	BJS	INC	BJS	BJS	BJS	BJS	BJS	Not Exist	Not Exist	Not Exist
1971	INC: 7	Not Exist	INC	INC	INC	INC	INC	INC	INC	Not Exist	Not Exist	Not Exist
1977	JP: 7	Not Exist	JP	JP	JP	JP	JP	JP	JP	Not Exist	Not Exist	Not Exist
1980	INC: 6 & JP: 1	Not Exist	JP	INC	INC	INC	INC	INC	INC	Not Exist	Not Exist	Not Exist
1984	INC: 7	Not Exist	INC	INC	INC	INC	INC	INC	INC	Not Exist	Not Exist	Not Exist
1989	BJP: 4, INC: 2 & JD: 1	Not Exist	BJP	JD	INC	BJP	BJP	INC	BJP	Not Exist	Not Exist	Not Exist
1991	BJP: 5 & INC: 2	Not Exist	BJP	INC	BJP	INC	BJP	BJP	BJP	Not Exist	Not Exist	Not Exist
1996	BJP: 5 & INC: 2	Not Exist	BJP	BJP	INC	BJP	INC	BJP	BJP	Not Exist	Not Exist	Not Exist
1998	BJP: 6 & INC: 1	Not Exist	BJP	BJP	BJP	BJP	INC	BJP	BJP	Not Exist	Not Exist	Not Exist
1999	BJP: 7	Not Exist	BJP	BJP	BJP	BJP	BJP	BJP	BJP	Not Exist	Not Exist	Not Exist
2004	INC: 6 & BJP: 1	Not Exist	INC	INC	INC	INC	INC	INC	BJP	Not Exist	Not Exist	Not Exist
2009	INC: 7	Not Exist	INC	Not Exist	INC	Not Exist	Not Exist	INC	INC	INC	INC	INC
2014	BJP: 7	Not Exist	BJP	Not Exist	BJP	Not Exist	Not Exist	BJP	BJP	BJP	BJP	BJP
2019	BJP: 7	Not Exist	BJP	Not Exist	BJP	Not Exist	Not Exist	BJP	BJP	BJP	BJP	BJP
2024	BJP: 7	Not Exist	BJP	Not Exist	BJP	Not Exist	Not Exist	BJP	BJP	BJP	BJP	BJP

== Vidhan Sabha elections ==
Election	Assembly	Party-wise Details	Chief Minister(s)	Party
1952	Interim	Total: 48. INC: 39, Bharatiya Jana Sangh: 5	Chaudhary Brahm Prakash; Gurmukh Nihal Singh	Indian National Congress
1993 (Note: The Assembly was abolished from 1956 to 1993)	First	Total: 70. BJP: 49, INC: 14	Madan Lal Khurana; Sahib Singh Verma; Sushma Swaraj	Bharatiya Janata Party
1998	Second	Total: 70. INC: 52, BJP: 15	Sheila Dikshit	Indian National Congress
2003	Third	Total: 70. INC: 47, BJP: 20	Sheila Dikshit	Indian National Congress
2008	Fourth	Total: 70. INC: 43, BJP: 23	Sheila Dikshit	Indian National Congress
2013	Fifth	Total: 70. BJP: 32, AAP: 28, INC: 8	Arvind Kejriwal	Aam Aadmi Party
2015	Sixth	Total: 70. AAP: 67, BJP: 3	Arvind Kejriwal	Aam Aadmi Party
2020	Seventh	Total: 70. AAP: 62, BJP: 8	Arvind Kejriwal	Aam Aadmi Party
2025	Eighth	Total: 70. BJP: 48, AAP: 22	Rekha Gupta	Bharatiya Janata Party

== Metropolitan Council elections ==
Election Year	CHAIRMAN	Party-wise break-up
1967	L. K. Advani (BJS); Shyam Charan Gupta (BJS)	BJS: 33/56, INC: 19/56
1972	Mir Mushtaq Ahmed (INC)	INC: 44/56, BJS : 5/56
1977	Kalka Dass (JP)	JP: 46/56, INC: 10/56
1983	Purushottam Goyel (INC)	INC: 34/56, BJP: 19/56

== Municipal Corporation elections ==
Election Year	Mayor	Party-wise break-up
1997		
2002		
2007		Total: 272. BJP: 164, INC: 67
2012		Total: 272. BJP: 142, INC: 77
2017		Total: 270. BJP: 181, AAP: 48, INC: 30
2022		Total: 250. AAP: 134, BJP: 104 INC: 9
