= 1989 Indian general election in Delhi =

- November 22, 1989

7 seats
- Turnout: 54.3%
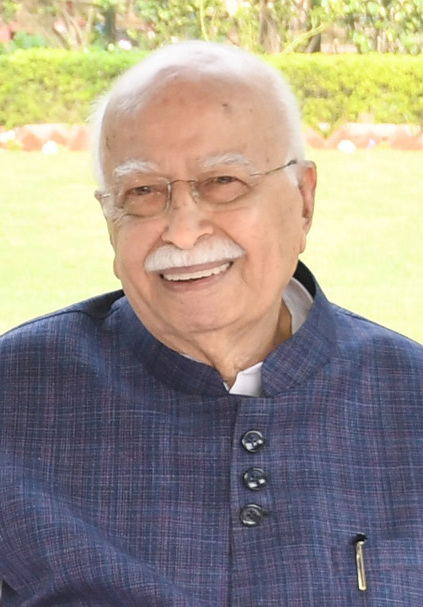

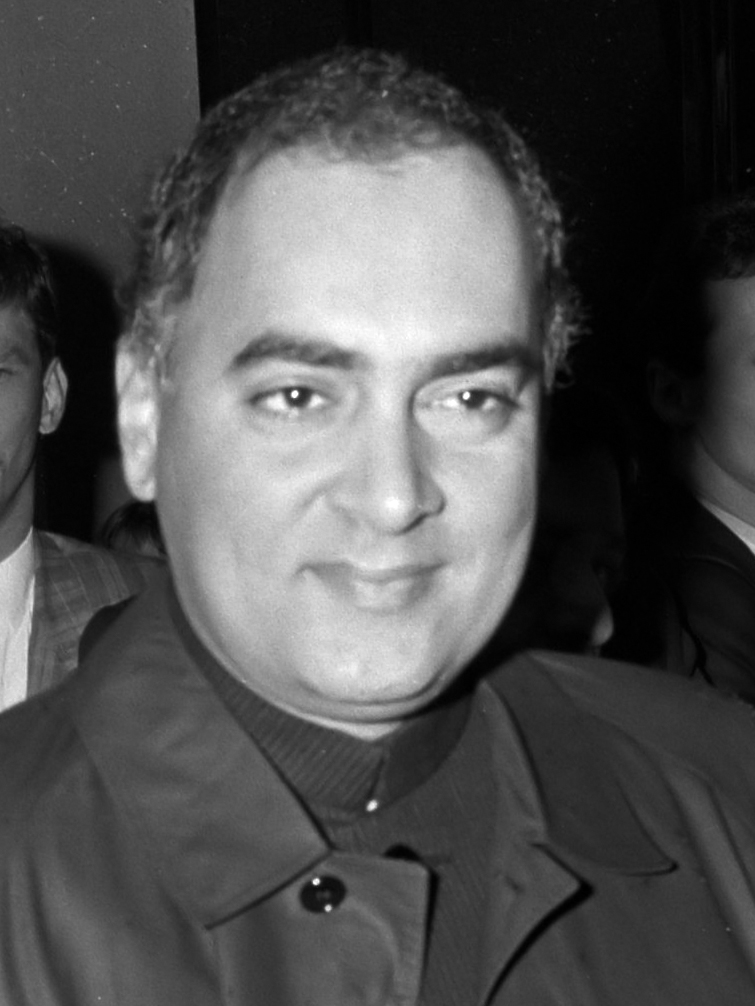

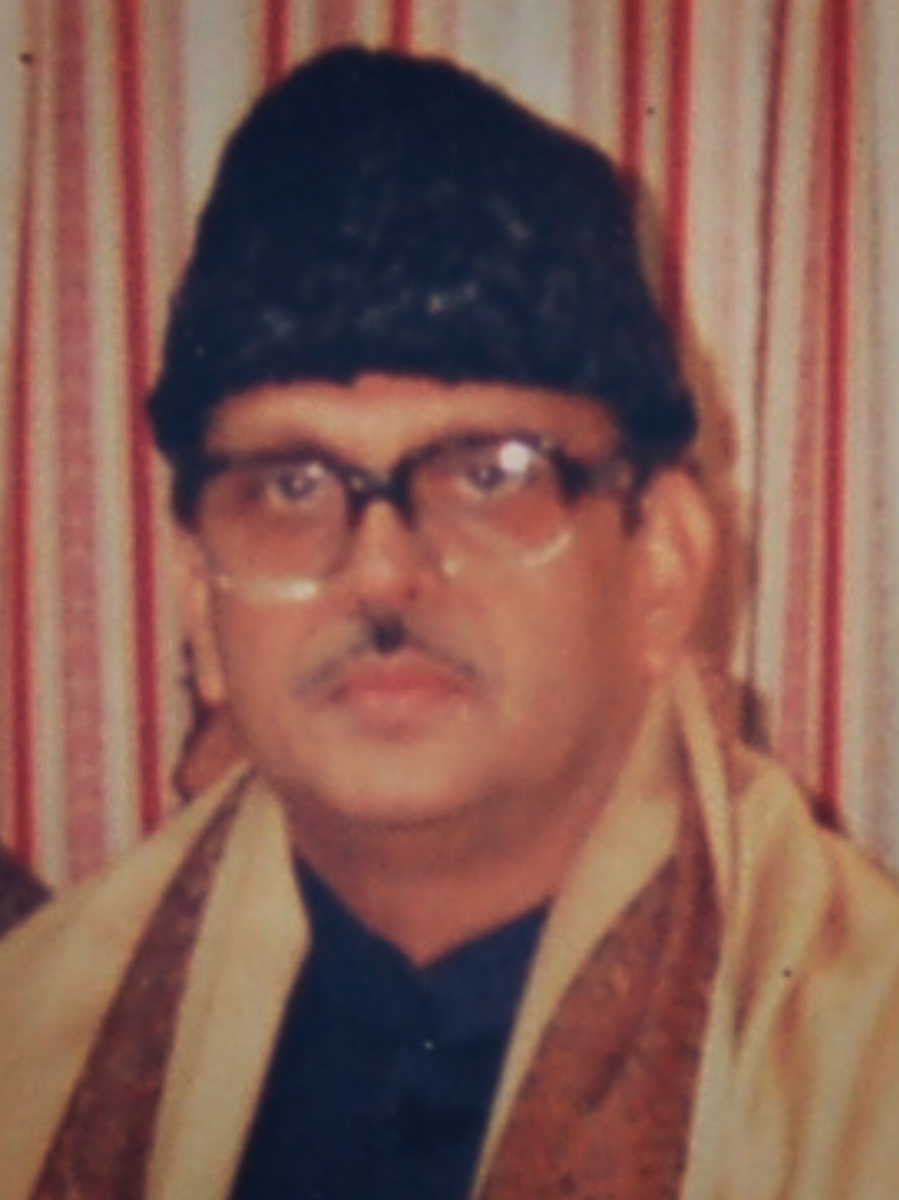
| | First party | Second party | Third party |
|---|---|---|---|
| Leader | L. K. Advani | Rajiv Gandhi | V. P. Singh |
| Party | BJP | INC | JD |
| Seats won | 4 | 2 | 1 |
| Seat change | ▲4 | ▼5 | New |
| Popular vote | 798,003 | 1,322,876 | 496,007 |
| Percentage | 26.19% | 43.41% | 16.28% |
| Swing | ▲7.34 | ▼25.31 | New |
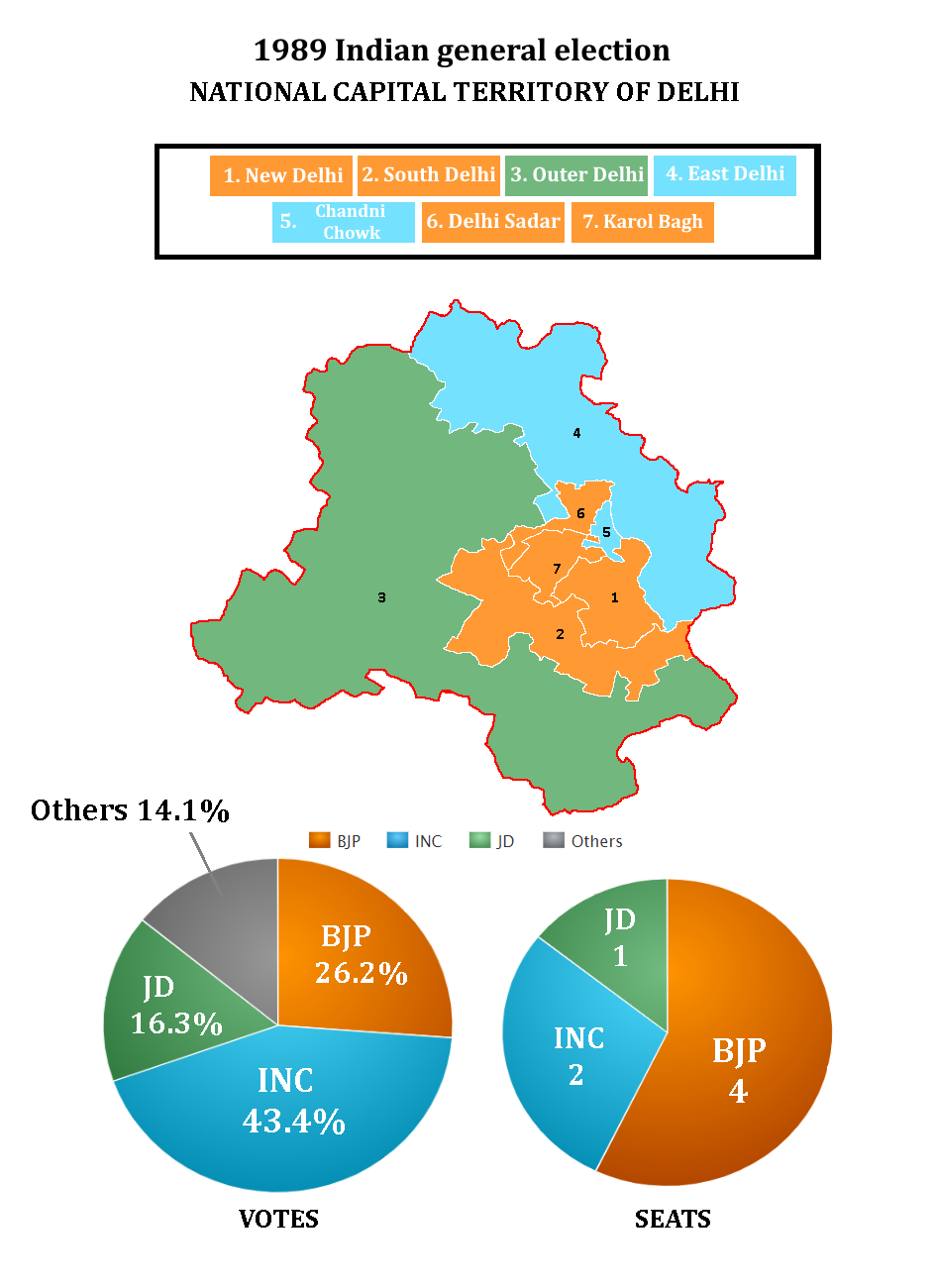
Prime Minister before election
Rajiv Gandhi
INC
Prime Minister after election
V. P. Singh
JD

The 1989 Indian general election in Delhi was held to elect representatives of the 7 seats of the NCT of Delhi in the Lok Sabha.

The Bharatiya Janata Party won 4 of the 7 seats in Delhi, with its opposition, the Indian National Congress winning 2 seats, and the Janata Dal at third place with one seat. Although the BJP won most of the seats, the Congress led in terms of votes.

== Parties and alliances ==
=== Bharatiya Janata Party ===
| No. | Party | Flag | Symbol | Leader | Seats contested |
|---|---|---|---|---|---|
| 1. | Bharatiya Janata Party | | | L. K. Advani | 5 |

=== Indian National Congress ===
| No. | Party | Flag | Symbol | Leader | Seats contested |
|---|---|---|---|---|---|
| 1. | Indian National Congress | | | Rajiv Gandhi | 7 |

=== Janata Dal ===
| No. | Party | Flag | Symbol | Leader | Seats contested |
|---|---|---|---|---|---|
| 1. | Janata Dal | | | V. P. Singh | 3 |

== List of Candidates ==
| Constituency | | | | | | | |
| Constituency | | BJP | | INC | | JD | |
| 1 | New Delhi | BJP | L. K. Advani | INC | V. Mohini Giri | Did not contest | |
| 2 | South Delhi | BJP | Madan Lal Khurana | INC | Subhash Chopra | Did not contest | |
| 3 | Outer Delhi | Did not contest | | INC | Bharat Singh | JD | Tarif Singh |
| 4 | East Delhi | Did not contest | | INC | H. K. L. Bhagat | JD | Kishore Lal |
| 5 | Chandni Chowk | BJP | Satish Khandelwal | INC | Jai Prakash Aggarwal | JD | Mirza Saadiq Ali |
| 6 | Delhi Sadar | BJP | Vijay Kumar Malhotra | INC | Jagdish Tytler | Did not contest | |
| 7 | Karol Bagh (SC) | BJP | Kalka Dass | INC | Dharam Dass Shastri | Did not contest | |

== Results ==
=== Results by Party/Alliance ===
| Party Name | Popular vote | | | Seats | | |
| Party Name | Votes | % | ±pp | Contested | Won | +/− |
|---|---|---|---|---|---|---|
| BJP | 7,98,003 | 26.19 | ▲7.34 | 5 | 4 | ▲4 |
| INC | 13,22,876 | 43.41 | ▼25.31 | 7 | 2 | ▼5 |
| JD | 4,96,007 | 16.28 | Steady | 3 | 1 | ▲1 |
| BSP | 1,11,269 | 3.65 | Steady | 5 | 0 | Steady |
| Others | 33,472 | 1.09 | Steady | 38 | 0 | Steady |
| IND | 2,85,689 | 9.38 | ▲5.72 | 179 | 0 | Steady |
| Total | 30,47,316 | 100% | - | 237 | 7 | - |

== List of elected MPs ==
| Constituency | | Winner | | | | Runner-up | | | | Margin | |
| Constituency | | Candidate | Party | Votes | % | Candidate | Party | Votes | % | Votes | % |
|---|---|---|---|---|---|---|---|---|---|---|---|
| 1 | New Delhi | Lal Krishna Advani | BJP | 129,256 | 55.54 | V. Mohini Giri | INC | 97,415 | 41.85 | 31,841 | 13.69 |
| 2 | South Delhi | Madan Lal Khurana | BJP | 282,904 | 59.42 | Shubash Chopra | INC | 177,910 | 37.37 | 104,994 | 22.05 |
| 3 | Outer Delhi | Tarif Singh | JD | 384,076 | 49.46 | Bharat Singh | INC | 331,743 | 42.72 | 52,333 | 6.74 |
| 4 | East Delhi | H. K. L. Bhagat | INC | 359,602 | 49.79 | Chand Ram | IND | 183,603 | 25.42 | 175,999 | 24.37 |
| 5 | Chandni Chowk | Jai Prakash Aggarwal | INC | 89,891 | 35.91 | Satish Chander Khandelwal | BJP | 80,460 | 32.14 | 9,431 | 3.77 |
| 6 | Delhi Sadar | Vijay Kumar Malhotra | BJP | 163,524 | 53.75 | Jagdish Tytler | INC | 131,425 | 43.20 | 32,099 | 10.55 |
| 7 | Karol Bagh (SC) | Kalka Dass | BJP | 141,859 | 49.74 | Dharam Dass Shastri | INC | 134,890 | 47.30 | 6,969 | 2.44 |
