= 1984 Indian general election in Delhi =

- 24 December 1984

7 seats
- Turnout: 64.5%
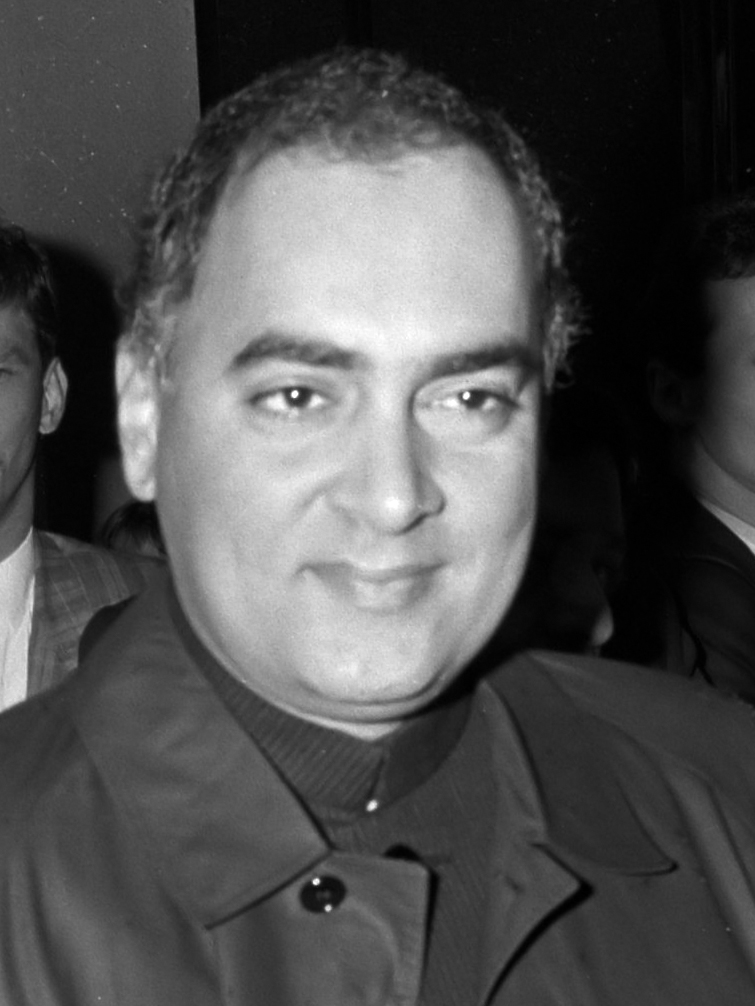

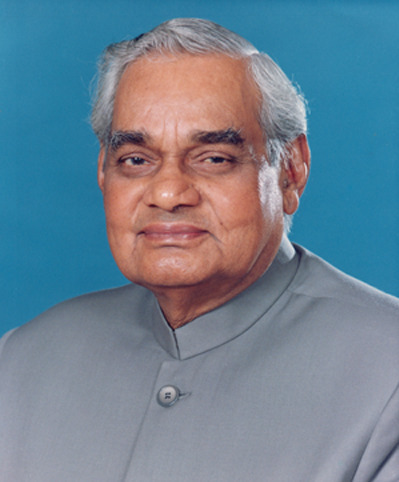
	First party	Second party
Leader	Rajiv Gandhi	Atal Bihari Vajpayee
Party	INC	BJP
Seats won	7	0
Seat change	▲1	New
Popular vote	1,528,252	419,210
Percentage	68.72%	18.85%
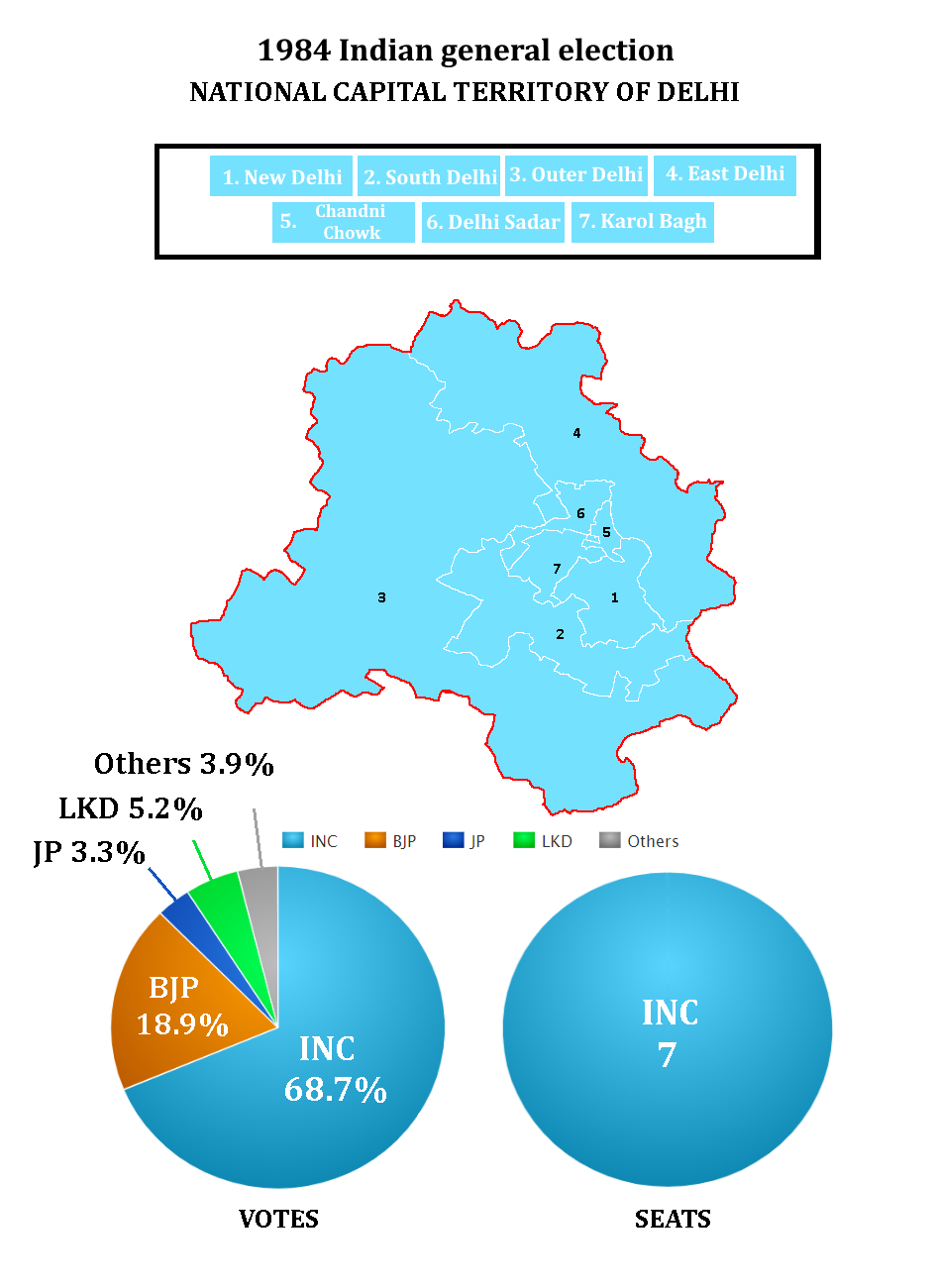
Prime Minister before election
Rajiv Gandhi
INC
Prime Minister after election
Rajiv Gandhi
INC

The 1984 Indian general election in Delhi was held to elect representatives of the 7 seats of the NCT of Delhi in the Lok Sabha.

The Indian National Congress won all the seven seats of Delhi and won two-thirds of the votes. This was the second of three times in which the Congress won all seven seats of Delhi, the first time being in the 1971 Indian general election.

== Parties and alliances ==
=== Indian National Congress ===
No.	Party	Flag	Symbol	Leader	Seats contested
1.	Indian National Congress			Rajiv Gandhi	7

=== Bharatiya Janata Party ===
No.	Party	Flag	Symbol	Leader	Seats contested
1.	Bharatiya Janata Party			A. B. Vajpayee	5

== Results ==
=== Results by Party/Alliance ===
Party Name	Popular vote			Seats		
Party Name	Votes	%	±pp	Contested	Won	+/−
INC	15,28,252	68.72	▲18.32	7	7	▲1
BJP	4,19,210	18.85	Steady	5	0	Steady
LKD	1,15,777	5.21	Steady	1	0	Steady
JP	73,970	3.33	▼34.57	1	0	▼1
INC(J)	5,354	0.24	Steady	1	0	Steady
IND	81,420	3.66	▲0.25	174	0	Steady
Total	22,23,983	100%	-	189	7	-

== Elected MPs ==
Constituency		Winner				Runner Up				Margin	%
#	Name	Candidate	Party	Votes	%	Candidate	Party	Votes	%	Margin	%
1	New Delhi	K. C. Pant	INC	1,31,932	67.86	Kanwar Lal Gupta	BJP	59,046	30.37	72,886	37.49
2	South Delhi	Lalit Maken	INC	2,15,898	61.07	Vijay Kumar Malhotra	BJP	1,30,847	37.01	85,051	24.06
3	Outer Delhi	Ch. Bharat Singh	INC	3,65,454	72.75	Tarif Singh	LKD	1,15,777	23.05	2,49,677	49.70
4	East Delhi	H. K. L. Bhagat	INC	3,86,150	76.95	Kishore Lal	JP	73,970	14.74	3,12,180	62.21
5	Chandni Chowk	Jai Parkash Aggarwal	INC	1,22,069	60.52	Sikander Bakht	BJP	74,993	37.18	47,076	23.34
6	Delhi Sadar	Jagdish Tytler	INC	1,55,333	62.11	Madan Lal Khurana	BJP	89,480	35.78	65,853	26.33
7	Karol Bagh (SC)	Sundarwati Nawal	INC	1,51,416	68.81	Surender Pal Ratawal	BJP	64,844	29.47	86,572	39.34

== Post-election Union Council of Ministers from Delhi ==
SI No.	Name	Constituency	Designation	Department	From	To	Party
1	K. C. Pant	New Delhi	Cabinet Minister	Education	31 December 1984	25 September 1985	INC
1	K. C. Pant	New Delhi	Cabinet Minister	Steel and Mines	25 September 1985	12 April 1987	INC
1	K. C. Pant	New Delhi	Cabinet Minister	Defence	12 April 1987	2 December 1989	INC
2	H. K. L. Bhagat	East Delhi	Cabinet Minister	Parliamentary Affairs	31 December 1984	2 December 1989	INC
2	H. K. L. Bhagat	East Delhi	Cabinet Minister	Tourism	25 September 1985	12 May 1986	INC
2	H. K. L. Bhagat	East Delhi	Cabinet Minister	Food and Civil Supplies	12 May 1986	14 February 1988	INC
2	H. K. L. Bhagat	East Delhi	Cabinet Minister	Information and Broadcasting	14 February 1988	2 December 1989	INC
3	Jagdish Tytler	Delhi Sadar	Minister of State	Transport (Civil Aviation)	25 September 1985	22 October 1986	INC
3	Jagdish Tytler	Delhi Sadar	MoS(I/C)	Civil Aviation	22 October 1986	14 February 1988	INC
3	Jagdish Tytler	Delhi Sadar	MoS(I/C)	Tourism	28 July 1987	14 February 1988	INC
3	Jagdish Tytler	Delhi Sadar	MoS(I/C)	Labour	14 February 1988	25 June 1988	INC
