= Sundarwati Nawal Prabhakar =

Indian politician

Member of the Lok Sabha for Karol Bagh
- In office 1984–1989
- Preceded by: Dharam Dass Shastri
- Succeeded by: Kalka Dass

Personal details
- Born: 9 September 1922 Delhi, India
- Died: 24 March 2010 (aged 87) Delhi, India
- Party: Indian National Congress

Sundarwati Nawal Prabhakar (1922–2010) was an Indian National Congress politician from Delhi. She represented Karol Bagh in the 8th Lok Sabha.

== Early life ==
Sundarwati was born on 9 September 1922 in Delhi. She was educated privately.

== Career ==
Sundarwati was involved in the Indian Independence movement and participated in the 1942 Quit India Movement. She volunteered for the Defence Fund during the Sino-Indian War (1962) and Indo-Pakistani War of 1965. In recognition for her social service, she was awarded a shield by the then Prime Minister of India. She was the director of Delhi Scheduled Castes Financial and Development Corporation and a member of the Delhi Metropolitan Council from 1972 to 1980 and 1982–84. She won the 1980 Indian general election and represented Karol Bagh in the 8th Lok Sabha.

During her term as a Member of Parliament, Sunderwati served on the Committee on Private Members' Bills and Resolutions. She was also a member of the managing committee of the Shivaji College and the Social Welfare Board in Delhi.

== Personal life ==
Sundarwati married prominent INC politician and Member of Parliament Naval Prabhakar in 1936 and had eight children from him. She died on 24 March 2010 in Delhi.

Naval Prabhakar, served as a Member of Parliament (MP), he was involved in overseeing development planning efforts for Delhi through his membership in relevant committees and bodies. He helped design what is now modern Delhi.

His involvement in Delhi planning included:

- Delhi Improvement Trust: He was listed as a member of the Delhi Improvement Trust.
- Delhi Development Authority (DDA): He was also a member of the Advisory Council for the Delhi Development Authority (DDA).

These bodies were instrumental in shaping the urban development and infrastructure of Delhi in the mid-20th century. He was an MP from the First Lok Sabha and subsequent sessions of parliament that followed after. He participated in various parliamentary discussions and questions related to Delhi, such as community projects in the state. Sundarwati succeeded him later serving as a Member of Parliament, representing the Karol Bagh constituency in the 8th Lok Sabha.
