= Srichand =

Srichand was an Indian politician. Srichand was elected to the Delhi Metropolitan Council in the 1967 election, standing as the Jana Sangh candidate in Shakoor Basti constituency. He later joined the Communist Party of India. He was active in the trade union movement. In the 1972 Delhi Metropolitan Council election Srichand stood as the CPI candidate in Shakoor Basti, with Indian National Congress support. He retained the seat, obtaining 27,630 votes (57.63%).

Srichand died in 2013.
