= 1996 Indian general election in Delhi =

- April 27, 1996

7 seats
- Turnout: 50.6%
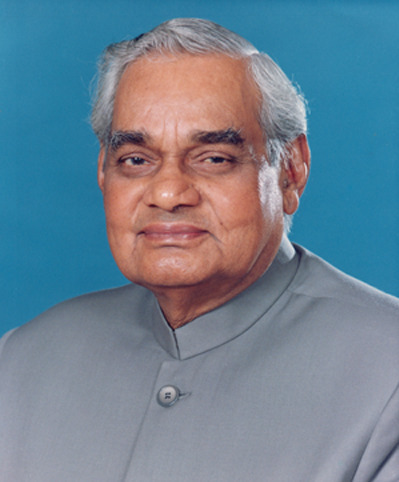

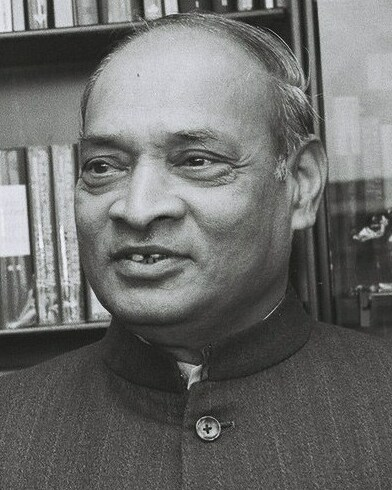
| | First party | Second party |
|---|---|---|
| Leader | Atal Bihari Vajpayee | P. V. Narasimha Rao |
| Party | BJP | INC |
| Seats won | 5 | 2 |
| Seat change | Steady | Steady |
| Popular vote | 1,992,947 | 1,500,731 |
| Percentage | 49.58% | 37.33% |
| Swing | ▲9.31 pp | ▼2.24 pp |
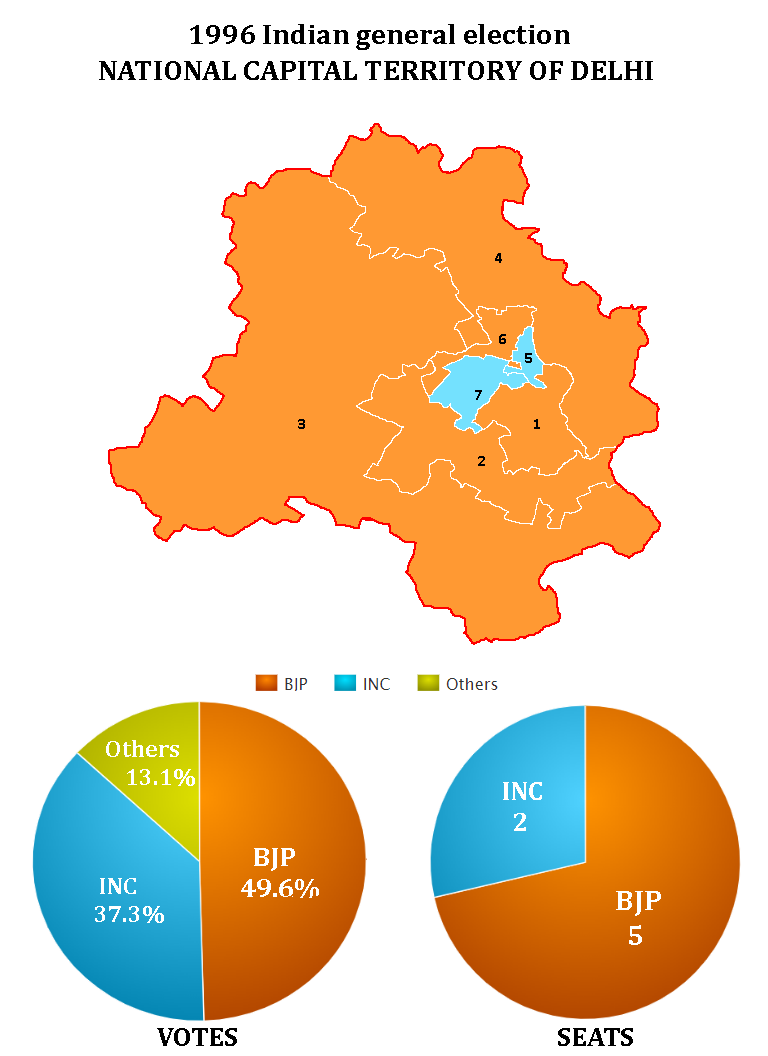
Prime Minister before election
Narasimha Rao
INC
Prime Minister after election
A. B. Vajpayee
BJP

The 1996 Indian general election in Delhi was held to elect representatives of the 7 seats of the NCT of Delhi in the Lok Sabha.

The Bharatiya Janata Party won 5 of the 7 seats in Delhi, with its opposition, the Indian National Congress winning 2 seats.

== Parties and alliances ==
=== Bharatiya Janata Party ===
| No. | Party | Flag | Symbol | Leader | Seats contested |
|---|---|---|---|---|---|
| 1. | Bharatiya Janata Party | | | A. B. Vajpayee | 7 |

=== Indian National Congress ===
| No. | Party | Flag | Symbol | Leader | Seats contested |
|---|---|---|---|---|---|
| 1. | Indian National Congress | | | P. V. Narasimha Rao | 7 |

== Results ==
=== Results by Party/Alliance ===
| Party Name | Popular vote | | | Seats | | |
| Party Name | Votes | % | ±pp | Contested | Won | +/− |
|---|---|---|---|---|---|---|
| BJP | 19,94,550 | 49.62 | ▲9.41 | 7 | 5 | Steady |
| INC | 14,99,128 | 37.29 | ▼2.28 | 7 | 2 | Steady |
| JD | 1,70,609 | 4.24 | ▼9.97 | 5 | 0 | Steady |
| AIIC(T) | 90,250 | 2.25 | Steady | 7 | 0 | Steady |
| Others | 1,10,072 | 2.75 | Steady | 119 | 0 | Steady |
| IND | 1,55,215 | 3.86 | ▲1.29 | 378 | 0 | Steady |
| Total | 40,19,824 | 100% | - | 523 | 7 | - |

== List of Elected MPs ==
| Constituency | | Winner | | | | Runner-up | | | | Margin | |
| Constituency | | Candidate | Party | Votes | % | Candidate | Party | Votes | % | Votes | % |
|---|---|---|---|---|---|---|---|---|---|---|---|
| 1 | New Delhi | Jagmohan | BJP | 139,945 | 54.34 | Rajesh Khanna | INC | 81,630 | 31.70 | 58,315 | 22.64 |
| 2 | South Delhi | Sushma Swaraj | BJP | 294,570 | 55.63 | Kapil Sibal | INC | 180,564 | 34.10 | 114,006 | 21.53 |
| 3 | Outer Delhi | Krishan Lal Sharma | BJP | 701,262 | 52.50 | Sajjan Kumar | INC | 468,129 | 35.05 | 233,133 | 17.45 |
| 4 | East Delhi | B. L. Sharma "Prem" | BJP | 538,655 | 48.73 | Deep Chand Bandhu | INC | 386,156 | 34.93 | 152,499 | 13.80 |
| 5 | Chandni Chowk | Jai Parkash Agarwal | INC | 92,634 | 44.92 | J. K. Jain | BJP | 70,390 | 34.13 | 22,244 | 10.79 |
| 6 | Delhi Sadar | Vijay Kumar Goel | BJP | 140,282 | 47.17 | Jagdish Tytler | INC | 138,679 | 46.63 | 1,603 | 0.54 |
| 7 | Karol Bagh (SC) | Meira Kumar | INC | 151,336 | 52.53 | Kalka Das | BJP | 109,446 | 37.99 | 41,890 | 14.54 |
