= 1991 Indian general election in Delhi =

- May 20, 1991

7 seats
- Turnout: 48.5%
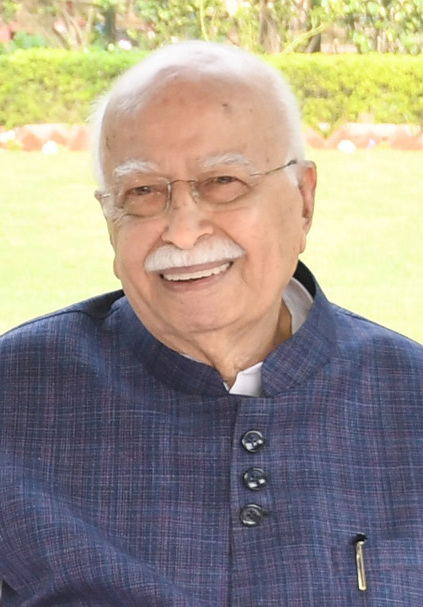

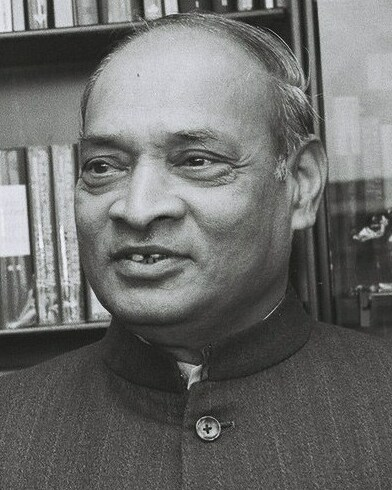
	First party	Second party
Leader	Lal Krishna Advani	P. V. Narasimha Rao
Party	BJP	INC
Seats won	5	2
Seat change	▲1	Steady
Popular vote	1,171,156	1,152,627
Percentage	40.27%	39.57%
Swing	▲14.08 pp	▼3.84 pp
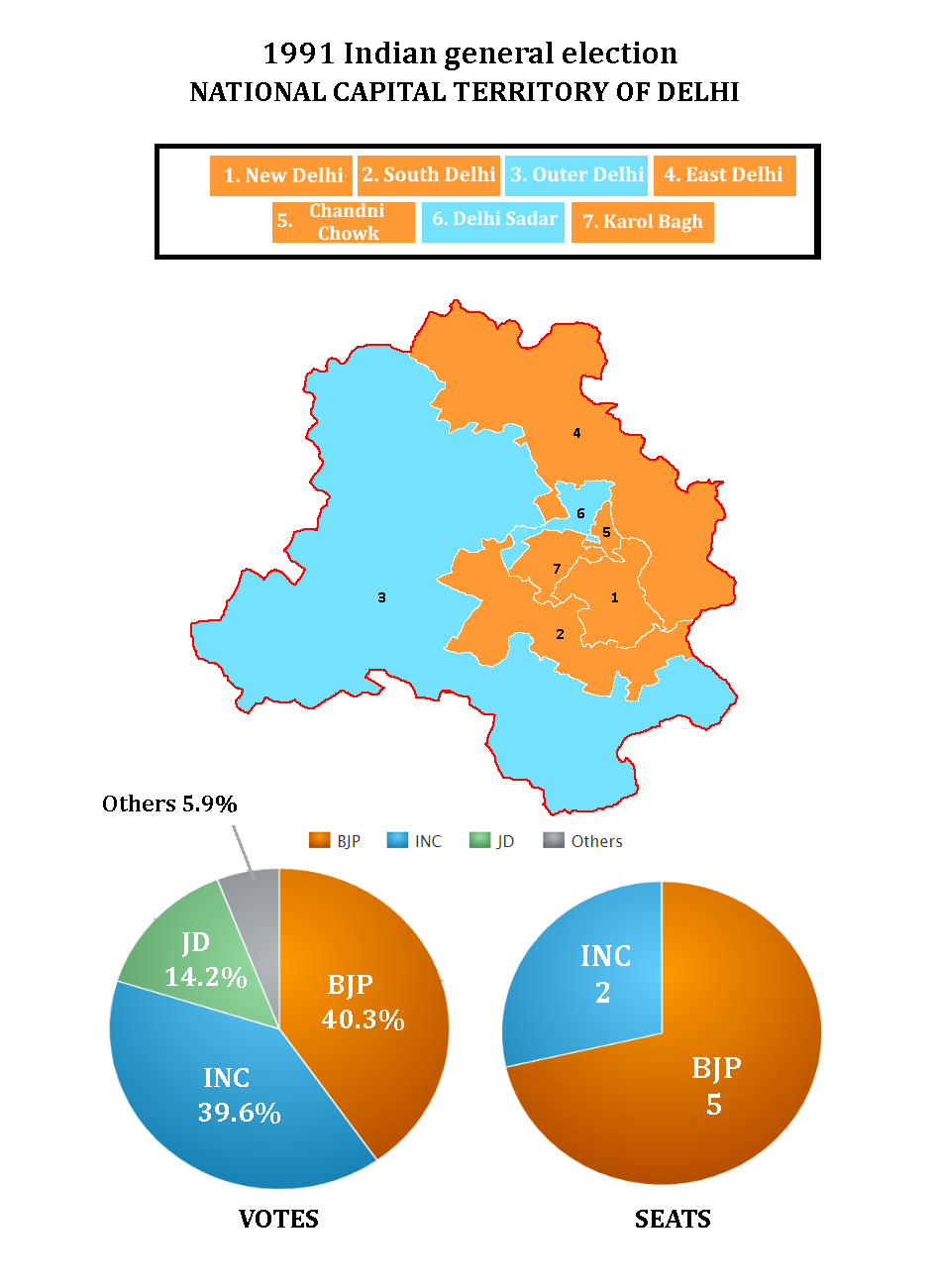
Prime Minister before election
Chandra Shekhar
SJP(R)
Prime Minister after election
Narasimha Rao
INC

The 1991 Indian general election in Delhi was held to elect representatives of the 7 seats of the NCT of Delhi in the Lok Sabha.

The Bharatiya Janata Party won 5 of the 7 seats in Delhi, with its opposition, the Indian National Congress winning 2 seats.

== Parties and alliances ==
=== Bharatiya Janata Party ===
No.	Party	Flag	Symbol	Leader	Seats contested
1.	Bharatiya Janata Party			L. K. Advani	7

=== Indian National Congress ===
No.	Party	Flag	Symbol	Leader	Seats contested
1.	Indian National Congress			P. V. Narasimha Rao	7

== Results ==
=== Results by Party/Alliance ===
Party Name	Popular vote			Seats		
Party Name	Votes	%	±pp	Contested	Won	+/−
BJP	11,71,156	40.21	▲14.02	7	5	▲1
INC	11,52,627	39.57	▼3.84	7	2	Steady
JD	4,13,933	14.21	▼2.07	7	0	▼1
JP	35,902	1.23	Steady	7	0	Steady
BSP	26,865	0.92	▼2.73	7	0	Steady
SAD(M)	9,918	0.34	Steady	1	0	Steady
CPI	2,800	0.10	Steady	1	0	Steady
Others	24,928	0.85	Steady	66	0	Steady
IND	74,734	2.57	▲6.81	399	0	Steady
Total	29,12,863	100%	-	502	7	-

== List of elected MPs ==
Constituency		Winner				Runner-up				Margin	
Constituency		Candidate	Party	Votes	%	Candidate	Party	Votes	%	Votes	%
1	New Delhi	Lal Krishan Advani	BJP	93,662	43.40	Rajesh Khanna	INC	92,073	42.66	1,589	0.74
2	South Delhi	Madan Lal Khurana	BJP	208,728	49.95	Romesh Bhandari	INC	158,005	37.81	50,723	12.14
3	Outer Delhi	Sajjan Kumar	INC	346,259	45.36	Sahib Singh Verma	BJP	259,468	33.99	86,791	11.37
4	East Delhi	B. L. Sharma 'Prem'	BJP	303,141	40.27	H. K. L. Bhagat	INC	241,316	32.05	61,825	8.22
5	Chandni Chowk	Tara Chand Khandelwal	BJP	80,898	35.70	Jai Prakash Aggarwal	INC	78,124	34.48	2,774	1.22
6	Delhi Sadar	Jagdish Tytler	INC	137,453	48.57	Vijay Kumar Malhotra	BJP	123,362	43.59	14,091	4.98
7	Karol Bagh (SC)	Kalka Dass	BJP	101,897	40.23	Krishna Tirath	INC	99,397	39.24	2,500	0.99

== Post-election Union Council of Ministers from Delhi ==
SI No.	Name	Constituency	Designation	Department	From	To	Party
1	Jagdish Tytler	Delhi Sadar	Minister of State (Independent Charge)	Surface Transport	21 June 1991	15 September 1995	INC
1	Jagdish Tytler	Delhi Sadar	Minister of State (Independent Charge)	Coal	13 September 1995	16 May 1996	INC
