= 1998 Indian general election in Delhi =

Indian general election in National Capital Territory of Delhi, 1998
- February 16, 1998

7 seats
- Turnout: 51.3%
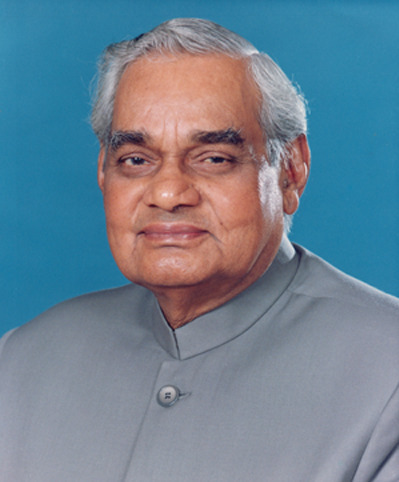

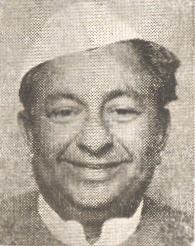
	First party	Second party
Leader	Atal Bihari Vajpayee	Sitaram Kesri
Party	BJP	INC
Seats won	6	1
Seat change	▲1	▼1
Popular vote	2,139,254	1,798,165
Percentage	50.73%	42.64%
Swing	▲1.51 pp	▲5.31 pp
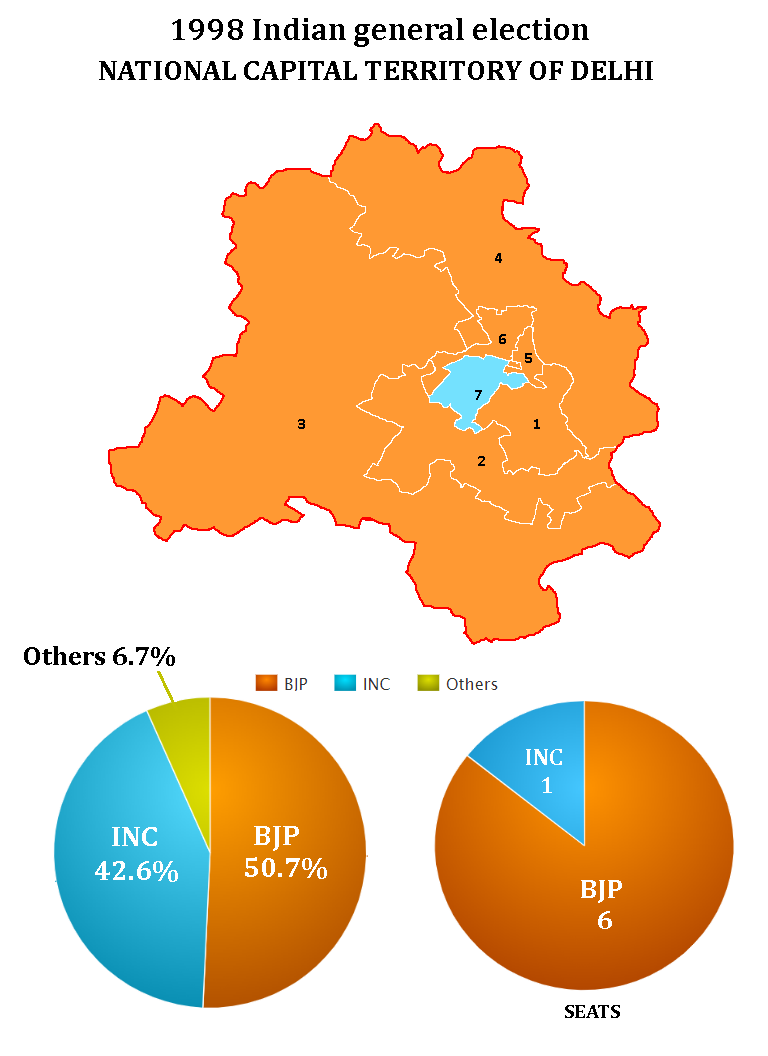
- Delhi
Prime Minister before election
Inder Kumar Gujral
JD
Prime Minister after election
A. B. Vajpayee
BJP

The 1998 Indian general election in Delhi was held to elect representatives of the 7 seats of the NCT of Delhi in the Lok Sabha.

The Bharatiya Janata Party won 6 of the 7 seats in Delhi, with its opposition, the Indian National Congress registering a narrow victory in the SC-reserved seat of Karol Bagh.

== Parties and alliances ==
=== National Democratic Alliance ===
No.	Party	Flag	Symbol	Leader	Seats contested
1.	Bharatiya Janata Party			A. B. Vajpayee	7

=== Indian National Congress ===
No.	Party	Flag	Symbol	Leader	Seats contested
1.	Indian National Congress			Sitaram Kesari	7

== Results ==
=== Results by Party/Alliance ===
Party Name	Popular vote			Seats		
Party Name	Votes	%	±pp	Contested	Won	+/−
BJP	21,39,254	50.73	▲1.11	7	6	▲1
INC	17,98,165	42.64	▲5.35	7	1	▼1
JD	1,03,602	2.46	▼1.78	5	0	Steady
BSP	98,847	2.34	Steady	6	0	Steady
SP	12,858	0.30	Steady	5	0	Steady
Others	43,039	1.02	Steady	43	0	Steady
IND	21,317	0.51	▼3.35	59	0	Steady
Total	42,17,082	100%	-	132	7	-

== List of elected MPs ==
Constituency		Winner				Runner Up				Margin	%
#	Name	Candidate	Party	Votes	%	Candidate	Party	Votes	%	Margin	%
1	New Delhi	Jagmohan	BJP	139,905	54.36	R. K. Dhawan	INC	107,258	41.68	32,647	12.68
2	South Delhi	Sushma Swaraj	BJP	331,756	58.76	Ajay Makan	INC	215,043	38.09	116,713	20.67
3	Outer Delhi	Krishan Lal Sharma	BJP	715,170	50.32	Deep Chand Sharma	INC	616,820	43.40	98,350	6.92
4	East Delhi	Lal Bihari Tiwari	BJP	563,083	48.83	Sheila Dikshit	INC	517,721	44.89	45,362	3.94
5	Chandni Chowk	Vijay Goel	BJP	79,546	35.31	Jai Parkash Agarwal	INC	75,197	33.38	4,349	1.93
6	Delhi Sadar	Madan Lal Khurana	BJP	168,733	56.91	M. M. Aggarwal	INC	120,239	40.55	48,494	16.36
7	Karol Bagh (SC)	Meira Kumar	INC	145,887	48.79	Surender Pal Ratawal	BJP	141,061	47.17	4,826	1.62

== Post-election Union Council of Ministers from NCT Delhi ==
#	Name	Constituency	Designation	Department	From	To	Party
1	Madan Lal Khurana	Delhi Sadar	Cabinet Minister	Parliamentary Affairs	19 March 1998	30 January 1999	BJP
1	Madan Lal Khurana	Delhi Sadar	Cabinet Minister	Tourism	19 March 1998	30 January 1999	BJP
2	Sushma Swaraj	South Delhi	Cabinet Minister	Information and Broadcasting	19 March 1998	11 October 1998	BJP
2	Sushma Swaraj	South Delhi	Cabinet Minister	Communications	20 April 1998	10 October 1998	BJP
3	Jagmohan	New Delhi	Cabinet Minister	Communications	5 December 1998	8 June 1999	BJP
3	Jagmohan	New Delhi	Cabinet Minister	Urban Development	8 June 1999	13 October 1999	BJP
