= 1977 Delhi Metropolitan Council election =

Union Territory election in India

- 6 October 1977

56 of 61 seats in the Delhi Metropolitan Council 31 seats needed for a majority
- Registered: 2,740,443
- Turnout: 55.85%
| | Majority party | Minority party |
|---|---|---|
| | JP |
| Leader | Kalka Dass |
| Party | JP | INC |
| Seats before | New | 44 |
| Seats won | 46 | 10 |
| Seat change | New | ▼34 |
| Popular vote | 52.58% | 36.15% |
Chairman of the Council before election
Mir Mustaq Ahmed
Elected Chairman of the Council
Kalka Dass
JP

Delhi Metropolitan Council election, 1977 was held in Indian National Capital Territory of Delhi to elect 56 councillors to the Delhi Metropolitan Council. This Council had no legislative powers, but only an advisory role in administration of the territory.

== Results ==
Summary of results of the Delhi Legislative Assembly election, 1977
| Party | Candidates | Seats won | Votes | Vote % |
|---|---|---|---|---|
| Janata Party | 56 | 46 | 783,873 | 52.88% |
| Indian National Congress | 52 | 10 | 538,974 | 36.15% |
| Total | 249 | 56 | 1,490,959 | |

The election elected Third Delhi Metropolitan Council. Kalka Dass was Chairman of the Council, Begum Khursheed Kidwai being Deputy Chairman.

== Elected members ==
| Constituency | Reserved for (SC/None) | Member | Party |
|---|---|---|---|
| Sarojini Nagar | None | P.n. Singh | Janata Party |
| Laxmibai Nagar | None | Kidar Nath Sachdeva | Janata Party |
| Gole Market | SC | Swarup Chand 'rajan' | Janata Party |
| Bara Khamba | None | Shiv Charan Gupta | Janata Party |
| Delhi Cantonment | None | Vimal Nagi | Indian National Congress |
| Minto Road | None | Viresh Pratap Choudhary | Janata Party |
| Jangpura | None | Inder Mohan Sehgal | Janata Party |
| Kasturba Nagar | None | Jaswant Singh Phull | Janata Party |
| Lajpat Nagar | None | Ram Lal Verma | Janata Party |
| Okhla | None | Lalit Mohan Gautam | Janata Party |
| Malviya Nagar | None | Hans Raj Sethi | Janata Party |
| R.k. Puram | None | Ram Bhaj | Janata Party |
| Hauz Khas | None | K.k. Gupta | Janata Party |
| Rajinder Nagar | None | Ram Nath Vij | Janata Party |
| Ashok Nagar | None | Vishnu Dutt | Janata Party |
| Tilak Nagar | None | O.p. Babbar | Janata Party |
| Rajouri Garden | None | Harbhagwan Arora | Janata Party |
| Moti Nagar | None | Madan Lal Khurana | Janata Party |
| Shakur Basti | None | Ram Gopal Sisodia | Janata Party |
| Rampura | None | Janardan Gupta | Janata Party |
| Wazirabad | SC | Mool Chand | Indian National Congress |
| Narela | None | Shanti Swaroop Tyagi | Janata Party |
| Bawana | None | Rohtas | Janata Party |
| Najafgarh | None | Chaudhary Bharat Singh | Indian National Congress |
| Madipur | SC | Bhore Lal | Indian National Congress |
| Palam | None | L. Singh | Janata Party |
| Mehrauli | SC | Kalka Dass | Janata Party |
| Tughlaqabad | SC | Prem Singh | Indian National Congress |
| Gita Colony | None | Ishwar Dass Mahajan | Janata Party |
| Gandhi Nagar | None | Som Nath | Janata Party |
| Krishna Nagar | None | Yog Dhayan Ahuja | Janata Party |
| Shahdara | None | Devendra Kumar Jain | Janata Party |
| Rohtas Nagar | None | Ved Prakash | Indian National Congress |
| Ghonda | None | Fateh Singh | Janata Party |
| Civil Lines | None | Kanwar Lal Sharma | Janata Party |
| Kamla Nagar | None | Charti Lal Goel | Janata Party |
| Vijay Nagar | None | Prashant Kumar | Janata Party |
| Model Town | None | Mahavir Vaid | Janata Party |
| Chandni Chowk | None | Raj Kumar Jain | Janata Party |
| Ballimaran | None | Vishwambhar Datt Sharma | Janata Party |
| Ajmeri Gate | None | Sanwal Dass Gupta | Janata Party |
| Kucha Pati Ram | None | Rajesh Sharma Alias Vasudev | Janata Party |
| Matia Mahal | None | Begum Khurshid | Janata Party |
| Pahar Ganj | None | Amar Nath Kumar | Janata Party |
| Ram Nagar | SC | Babu Ram Solanki | Indian National Congress |
| Qasabpura | None | Mohd. Ismail | Janata Party |
| Deputy Ganj | None | Shyam Chanran Gupta | Janata Party |
| Sohan Ganj | None | Inder Mohan Bhardwaj | Janata Party |
| Shakti Nagar | None | Satya Pal Chugh | Janata Party |
| Karampura | None | Brij Mohan Toofan | Janata Party |
| Sarai Rohilla | None | D.d. Vasisht | Janata Party |
| Motia Khan | None | Pushpa Kale | Janata Party |
| Dev Nagar | SC | Moti Lal Bakolia | Indian National Congress |
| Patel Nagar | None | Kedar Nath Sahni | Janata Party |
| Anand Parbat | SC | Dharam Dass Shastri | Indian National Congress |
| Shadipur | SC | Sundervati Naval Prabhakar | Indian National Congress |
