= Nilothi =

Village in India

Coordinates: 28°49′N 76°52′E

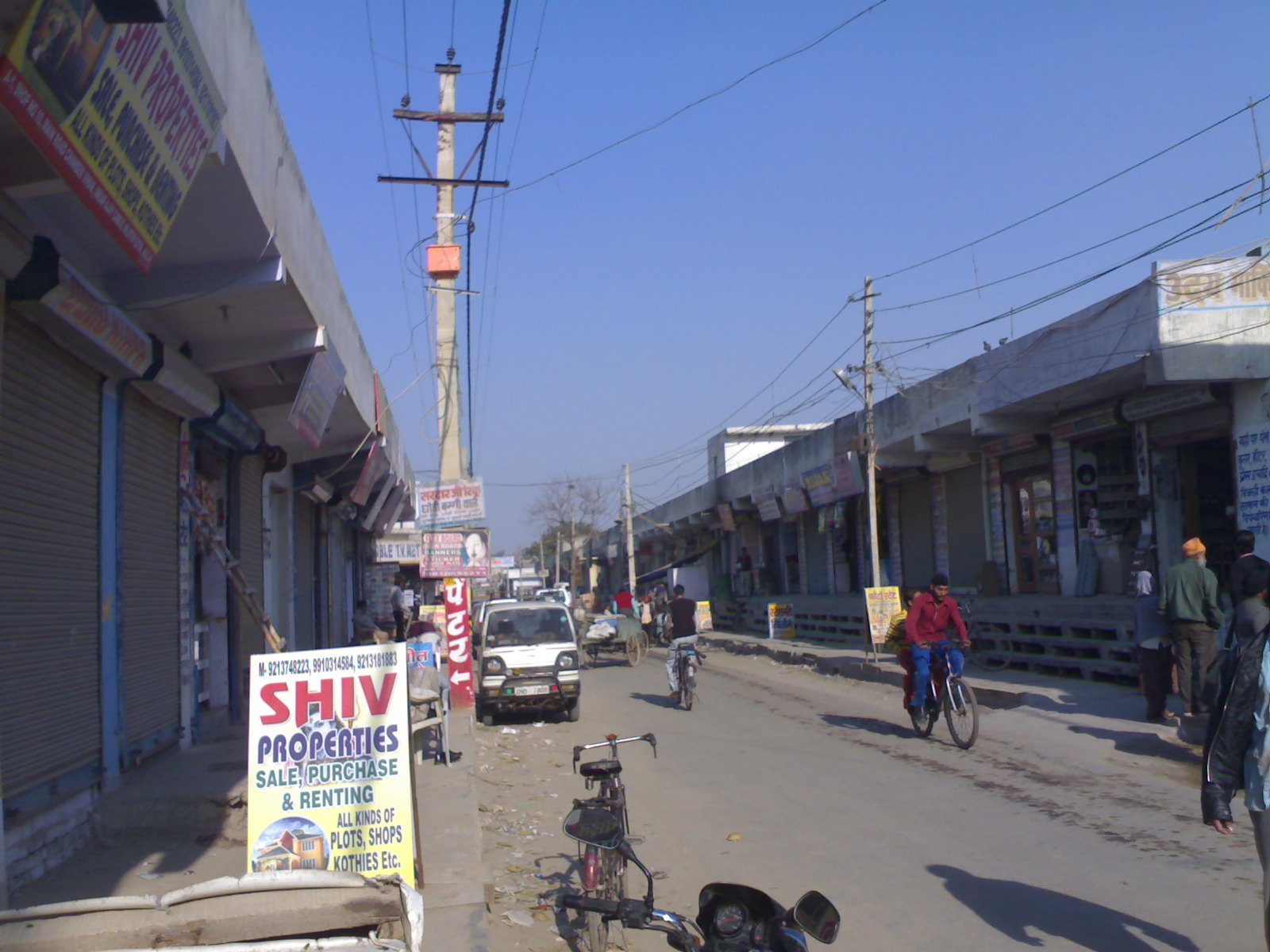
Main Road Syed Nangloi-Nilothi.

Nilothi is a developing city near Nangloi Jat on National Highway-10, Delhi in West Delhi district, Delhi, India. It is very well connected with Vikaspuri.

== Notable people ==
- Manoj Kumar Shokeen,-M.L.A. Nangloi Jat (Vidhan Sabha constituency) (Three Times MLA & 1 Time Municipal Councillor)
- Chaudhary Bharat Singh (Death: 19 April 2008), ex-M.P. Outer Delhi (Lok Sabha constituency) (1984–89).
