= Kanwar Lal Gupta =

Indian politician

Kanwar Lal Gupta (16 October 1924 – 19 January 1986) was an Indian politician. He represented Delhi Sadar (Lok Sabha constituency) in 4th Lok Sabha from 1967 to 1971 elected as a candidate of Bharatiya Jana Sangh and again in 6th Lok Sabha from 1977 to 1980 as a candidate of Janata Party. He was also a member of Delhi Legislative Assembly from 1953 to 1957 and Delhi Municipal Corporation from 1958 to 1962. He was imprisoned under MISA in the emergency in 1975.

Kanwar Lal Gupta was the losing candidate from Delhi Sadar seat in 1971 and 1980 Lok Sabha election. He contested 1984 Lok Sabha election from New Delhi seat as a member of Bharatiya Janata Party but lost. That was the last time he contested any Lok Sabha election.

Gupta died in Delhi on 19 January 1986, at the age of 61.
