= Internationalist Democratic Party =

Political party in India

The Internationalist Democratic Party is a Political Party in republic of India, working in Jammu & Kashmir, Punjab and Rajasthan. The IDP was Registered vide Chief Election Commissioner of India vide no.76 of 1991.

The IDP was founded in June,1986 after consistent investigations and by adopting regular rethinking process about the theory and practice of Communist Sociology and Corporate Sociology. The IDP concluded with an alternate model based on Nature-Human Centric Sociology which is the only way out of present ongoing Capital based Sociology .

The IDP was founded by R.P. Saraf, former revolutionary Communist Leader who started his political activeness at the age of 22 years as National Conference member and was elected member of the first Constituent Assembly (1952–1962) in JammuKashmir.First General Secretary of IDP was R P Saraf (1986–1993) and in 1993 Sajjan Kumar was elected as General secretary of IDP .Master Kheta Singh lead the party w.e.f December 1998 to February 2004 as General Secretary and w.e.f. February 2004 to December, 2010 as President of IDP because in 2004 the constitution of IDP was amended regarding the executive office bearers as president, vice President, General Sectary, office Secretary and Treasurer. In 2004 Hoshiar Singh was elected as General Secretary till his Martyrdom as he was gun-downed by un-identified gun men on 11 May 2008, at his residence along with his wife Shashi Bala who was President of Mahila Adhikar Sangthan JammuKashmir.

J A Kazmi Advocate was elected General Secretary of IDP in 2008. In December,2010, the 16th. National Congress of delegates of Internationalist Democratic Party was held at Sri Ganganagar ( Rajasthan ) in which seven members, National Committee " having Pr President, Mr. ID Khajuria and Karnail Singh, General Secretary was elected and also resolved unanimously that;-IDP passing through a process of rethinking and investigations about the theory and practice of. Communist Sociology and Corporate Sociology, IDP concluded an alternate model" on the basis of scientific reasoning, Humanist approach and rational methods of toleration to diversities in Nature and Human-kind and within Human groups which develop to each other through mutual unity and mutual struggle." Alternate Model " " Nature-Human Centric Sociology"
