= 1983 Delhi Metropolitan Council election =

Council election held in Delhi, India

- 2 May 1983

56 of 58 seats in the Delhi Metropolitan Council 30 seats needed for a majority
- Registered: 3,712,524
- Turnout: 55.29%

| | Majority party | Minority party |
|---|---|---|
| Party | INC | BJP |
| Seats won | 44 | 19 |
Elected Chairman of the Council
INC

Delhi Metropolitan Council election, 1983 was held in Indian National Capital Territory of Delhi to elect 56 councillors to the Delhi Metropolitan Council. This council had no legislative powers, but only an advisory role in administration of the territory.

== Results ==
Summary of results of the Delhi Metropolitan Council election, 1983
| Party | Candidates | Seats won | Votes | Vote % |
|---|---|---|---|---|
| Indian National Congress | 56 | 34 | 856,055 | 47.50% |
| Bharatiya Janata Party | 50 | 19 | 666,605 | 36.99% |
| Lok Dal | 6 | 2 | 73,765 | 4.09% |
| Janata Party | 37 | 1 | 65,980 | 3.66% |
| Total | 400 | 56 | 1,802,118 | |

The election elected Fourth Delhi Metropolitan Council. Purushottam Goel was Chairman of the council, Tajdar Babar being deputy chairman.

== Elected members ==
| Constituency | Reserved for (SC/None) | Member | Party |
|---|---|---|---|
| Sarojini Nagar | None | Ram Bhaj | Bharatiya Janata Party |
| Laxmibai Nagar | None | Arjun Dass | Indian National Congress |
| Gole Market | SC | R.n. Chandeliya | Indian National Congress |
| Bara Khamba | None | Tajdar Babar | Indian National Congress |
| Delhi Cantonment | None | Karan Singh Tanwar | Bharatiya Janata Party |
| Minto Road | None | Subhash Chopra | Indian National Congress |
| Jangpura | None | Jag Parvesh | Indian National Congress |
| Kasturba Nagar | None | Jagdish Lal | Bharatiya Janata Party |
| Lajpat Nagar | None | Ram Lal Verma | Bharatiya Janata Party |
| Okhla | None | Des Raj Chhabra | Indian National Congress |
| Malviya Nagar | None | Hans Raj Sethi | Bharatiya Janata Party |
| R .k. Puram | None | Archna Kumari | Bharatiya Janata Party |
| Hauz Khas | None | Ashok Kumar Jain | Indian National Congress |
| Rajinder Nagar | None | Ram Nath Vij | Bharatiya Janata Party |
| Ashok Nagar | None | Jagdish Mukhi | Bharatiya Janata Party |
| Tilak Nagar | None | Jaspal Singh | Indian National Congress |
| Rajouri Garden | None | Subhash Arya | Bharatiya Janata Party |
| Moti Nagar | None | Madan Lal Khurana | Bharatiya Janata Party |
| Shakur Basti | None | S.c. Vats | Indian National Congress |
| Rampura | None | Shyam Lal Garg | Bharatiya Janata Party |
| Wazirabad | SC | Malinder Singh | Indian National Congress |
| Narela | None | Hari Ram | Lok Dal |
| Bawana | None | Rohtash Singh | Lok Dal |
| Najafgarh | None | Chaudhary Bharat Singh | Indian National Congress |
| Madipur | SC | Bhonri Lal Shastri | Indian National Congress |
| Palam | None | Mukhtiar Singh | Indian National Congress |
| Mehrauli | SC | Kalka Dass | Bharatiya Janata Party |
| Tughlaquabad | SC | Prem Singh | Indian National Congress |
| Gita Colony | None | Darshan Kumar Bahl | Bharatiya Janata Party |
| Krishan Nagar | None | Sukhan | Indian National Congress |
| Gandhi Nagar | None | Sukhan | Indian National Congress |
| Shahdara | None | Narender Nath | Indian National Congress |
| Rohtas Nagar | None | Ram Narain | Indian National Congress |
| Ghonda | None | Kalayan Singh | Indian National Congress |
| Civil Lines | None | Ram Lal | Indian National Congress |
| Kamla Nagar | None | Purushottam Goyal | Indian National Congress |
| Vijay Nagar | None | Chander Amrit | Indian National Congress |
| Model Town | None | V.p. Khullar | Indian National Congress |
| Chandni Chowk | None | Vas Dev Kaptan | Bharatiya Janata Party |
| Ballimaran | None | Mehtab Chand Jain | Indian National Congress |
| Ajmeri Gate | None | Mirza Siddiq Ali | Janata Party |
| Kucha Pati Ram | None | Ashok Jain | Indian National Congress |
| Matia Mahal | None | Begum Khursheeed Kidwai | Bharatiya Janata Party |
| Pahar Ganj | None | Ranjit Rai Sharma | Bharatiya Janata Party |
| Ram Nagar | SC | Babu Ram Solanki | Indian National Congress |
| Qasabpura | None | Mohd. Ismail | Bharatiya Janata Party |
| Deputy Ganj | None | Satish Saxena | Indian National Congress |
| Sohan Ganj | None | Nand Lal | Indian National Congress |
| Shakti Nagar | None | Kulanand Bhartiya | Indian National Congress |
| Karampura | None | P.k. Chandla | Bharatiya Janata Party |
| Sarai Rohilla | None | Bansi Lal | Indian National Congress |
| Motia Khan | None | Manohar Lal | Indian National Congress |
| Dev Nagar | SC | Moti Lal Sakolia | Indian National Congress |
| Patel Nagar | None | Mawa Ram Arya | Bharatiya Janata Party |
| Anand Parbat | SC | Gurbax Singh | Indian National Congress |
| Shadipur | SC | Sundervati Naval Pravhakar | Indian National Congress |
