= Brahm Prakash (politician) =

Chaudhary Brahm Prakash Indian politician

Chaudhary Brahm Prakash Yadav
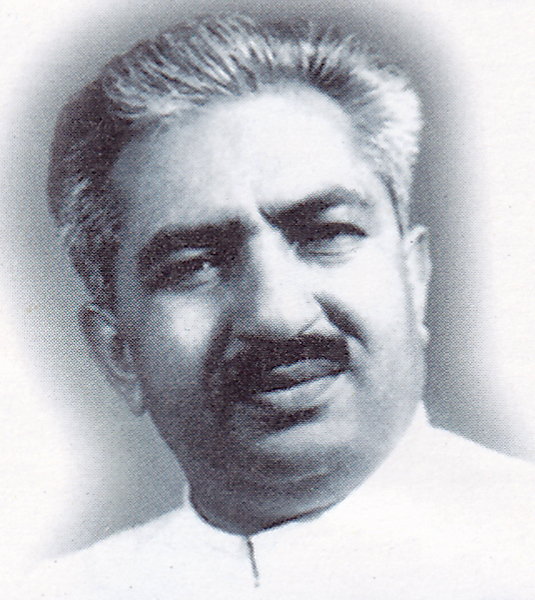

1st Chief Minister of Delhi
- In office 17 March 1952 – 12 February 1955
- Preceded by: Position established
- Succeeded by: Gurmukh Nihal Singh
- Constituency: Nangloi Jat

Member of Parliament, Lok Sabha for
- In office 1977–1980
- Preceded by: Dalip Singh
- Succeeded by: Sajjan Kumar
- Constituency: Outer Delhi
- In office 1967–1971
- Preceded by: Vacant
- Succeeded by: Dalip Singh
- Constituency: Outer Delhi
- In office 1962–1967
- Preceded by: Naval Prabhakar
- Succeeded by: Vacant
- Constituency: Outer Delhi
- In office 1957–1962
- Preceded by: Constituency established
- Succeeded by: Shiv Charan Gupta
- Constituency: Delhi Sadar

13th Minister of Agriculture
- In office 30 July 1979 – 14 January 1980
- Prime Minister: Charan Singh
- Preceded by: Surjit Singh Barnala
- Succeeded by: Rao Birendra Singh

Personal details
- Born: Chaudhary Brahm Prakash; 16 June 1918 Delhi, British India
- Died: 11 August 1993 (aged 75) Delhi, India
- Party: Indian National Congress; Janata Party

Chaudhary Brahm Prakash Yadav (16 June 1918 – 11 August 1993) was an Indian independence activist and extremely powerful politician who served as the first and youngest ever Chief Minister of Delhi as well as the president of The Delhi Pradesh Congress , 4 Time Member Of Parliament and The Union Minister for agriculture,food, cooperatives and irrigation . He was called “Sher e Dilli” or Lion of Delhi .

== Early life and independence movement ==
Chaudhary Brahm Prakash was born in the village of Shakurpur in Delhi. He was among the leaders of the underground activities in Delhi during the Quit India movement. He was imprisoned many times during the Indian independence movement. His father was a famous landlord, Bhagwan Das Yadav, they hailed from Shakurpur village of Delhi.

=== Post-independence ===
Post-independence, Prakash served as Minister in charge of Planning and Development as well as the first Chief Minister of Delhi at the age of 34 years, the second-youngest Chief Minister in India, in 1952–55. His stints in the Parliament twice won him accolades as an able parliamentarian. While he was with Congress Party, he was elected to the Lok Sabha from Delhi Sadar constituency in 1957, and from Outer Delhi in 1962 and 1967. He joined Janata Party later, and was elected to Lok Sabha again in 1977 from Outer Delhi. When the party split in 1979, he joined the Charan Singh faction, and became a minister for a few months. He made noteworthy contributions as the Union Cabinet Minister for Food, Agriculture, Irrigation and Cooperatives.

The cause of depressed sections of the society, rural development and empowerment of the weaker sections were issues, which were very close to the heart of Prakash. He was quick to realise the potential of cooperative societies in mitigating the hardships of the village folks. As early as in 1945, he started organising village and agriculture cooperatives. He was also a proponent of the Panchayati Raj institutions. He organised the National Union of Backward Classes, Scheduled Castes, Scheduled Tribes and Minorities in 1977 to work for the welfare of these weaker sections.

Prakash and Kurien of NDDB promoted the idea of Cooperative Companies to help free the cooperatives from the shackles of Government control through the Registrar of Cooperative Societies. It was a precursor to the present Producer Company model.

== See also ==
- Rekha Gupta
- Sahib Singh Verma

== See also ==
- List of chief ministers of Delhi

Political offices
| Preceded by NA (British Raj) | Chief Minister of the Delhi; 1952–55 | Succeeded by Gurumukh Nihal Singh |
