= Delhi City Lok Sabha constituency =

Former constituency of the Indian parliament in Delhi

Coordinates: 28.61°N 77.23°E

Delhi City
- Former Lok Sabha constituency

Constituency details
- Country: India
- Region: North India
- Union Territory: Delhi
- Established: 1952
- Abolished: 1957

Delhi City Lok Sabha constituency was a Lok Sabha (parliamentary) constituency in Delhi from 1951 to 1956. This constituency comprised the entire Kashmere Gate, Kotwali and Hauz Qazi police stations and part of Faiz Bazar police station (excluding the area covered by the erstwhile New Delhi Municipality) of Delhi, which was a Part C state from 1950 to 1956.

== Members of Parliament ==
| Election | Member | Party |
|---|---|---|
| 1951 | Radha Raman | Independent |
| 1957 onwards | Does not exist | |

== See also ==
- Chandni Chowk (Lok Sabha constituency)
- Delhi Sadar (Lok Sabha constituency)
