= Dharam Dass Shastri =

Indian politician

Dharam Dass Shastri (born 10 March 1937 in Hyderabad, Sindh, (now in Pakistan)) is a politician from Delhi, India. He belongs to Indian National Congress Party.He served as opposition leader in Delhi Metropolitan Council from 1977 to 1980.

He was member of 7th Lok Sabh during 1980–84. He was elected from Karol Bagh (Lok Sabha constituency) of Delhi.
