= Sajjan Kumar =

Indian politician (1945–2026)

Member of Parliament, Lok Sabha
- In office 1980–1984
- Preceded by: Chaudhary Brahm Prakash
- Succeeded by: Chaudhary Bharat Singh
- In office 1991–1996
- Preceded by: Tarif Singh
- Succeeded by: Krishan Lal Sharma
- In office 2004–2009
- Preceded by: Sahib Singh Verma
- Constituency: Outer Delhi

Personal details
- Born: 23 September 1945 Delhi, British India
- Died: 20 August 2026 (aged 80) Safdarjung Hospital, Delhi, India
- Party: Indian National Congress (1980–2018)
- Spouse: Ram Kaur
- Children: 3
- Relatives: Ramesh Kumar (brother)
- Known for: Role in the 1984 anti-Sikh riots
- Criminal information
- Status: Deceased
- Convictions: Murder, inciting and abetting mobs during the 1984 anti-Sikh riots
- Penalty: Life imprisonment

Sajjan Kumar (23 September 1945 – 20 August 2026) was an Indian politician and convicted murderer. He was a prominent leader of Indian National Congress. He was elected to the Lok Sabha, the lower house of the Parliament of India from Outer Delhi as a member of the Indian National Congress but resigned from the primary membership of the party after he was convicted and sentenced to life imprisonment for his role in the murder and involvement in the 1984 anti-Sikh riots.

== Political career ==
In 1977, Kumar was sworn in as the Delhi Councillor by prominent social activist Guru Radha Kishan. He was first elected to the Municipal Corporation of Delhi and was later appointed General Secretary, Pradesh Congress Committee (PCC), Delhi.

In 1980, he was elected to 7th Lok Sabha, and was a Member, Consultative Committee, Ministry of Works and Housing in the Lok Sabha. At the time, he was a Sanjay Gandhi loyalist and a bakery owner.

In 1991, he was re-elected to the Lok Sabha, and then again in 2004 when he won the outer Delhi seat, wherein he got 855,543 votes, representing Indian National Congress. Following his election in 2005, he served as Member, Committee on Urban Development and Committee on Members of Parliament Local Area Development Scheme.

== Investigations and conviction for role in anti-Sikh riots ==
=== PUDR & PUCL fact-finding report ===
In 1984, a fact-finding team jointly organized by People's Union for Democratic Rights (PUDR) and the People's Union for Civil Liberties (PUCL) concluded that attacks on members of the Sikh community in the 1984 anti-Sikh riots were not from spontaneous outrage over the assassination of Indian prime minister Indira Gandhi, but rather the result of deliberate planning by important politicians of the Indian National Congress party. The investigators found that the member of parliament who was most commonly named by Sikh riot survivors for being responsible for the attacks in the Delhi locality of Sultanpuri was Sajjan Kumar.

Similarly, Sikh riot survivors in the locality of Mangolpuri nearly unanimously named Kumar as having "masterminded the violence." They alleged that Kumar had given Rs. 100 and a bottle of liquor to each attacker in the genocide. The investigators also observed Sikh riot survivors confront Kumar directly at the Mangolpuri police station accusing him of being responsible for the riots. Later, Kumar attempted to provide food aid to hungry Sikh survivors at a refugee camp, but the refugees refused it, saying that he was behind the riots in the first place.

=== Delhi Police investigation ===
Prior to 2005, the Delhi Police had investigated Kumar's role in the riots. The investigation was then given to the Central Bureau of Investigation (CBI) in 2005 by recommendation from the Justice G.T. Nanavati Commission. In the subsequent investigation, the CBI concluded that there was a conspiracy of "terrifying proportion" between Kumar and the police during the riots, and that the Delhi police had systematically removed Kumar's name from all eyewitness testimony of the riots.

=== CBI investigation ===
In 2010, as a result of the CBI investigation, Kumar was tried for murder, dacoity, mischief to cause damage to property, promoting enmity between different communities, criminal conspiracy, and other provisions of the Indian Penal Code. Eyewitnesses testified how Sajjan Kumar had colluded with the police and incited mobs to kill Sikhs. In 2012, the CBI prosecutor told a Delhi court that genocide targeting the Sikhs had the "patronage" of Sajjan Kumar. CBI alleged that he organised anti-Sikh genocide and he, along with five others, are being tried for killing six Sikhs.

=== Trial and conviction ===
In April 2013, the Karkardooma district court in Delhi acquitted Sajjan Kumar, while convicting five others, leading to protests. On 27 August 2013, the Delhi High Court accepted an appeal filed by the CBI against Kumar's previous acquittal by a lower court. CBI stated that the trial court "erred in acquitting Sajjan Kumar as it was he who had instigated the mob during the riots".

Kumar was sentenced to life imprisonment by the Delhi High Court on 17 December 2018 for his role in the 1984 anti-Sikh riots, being convicted of murders of five family members and burning of a gurudwara. On 18 December 2018, he resigned from his party. His lawyer said that they would appeal in the Supreme Court of India.

He later filed an interim bail plea on medical grounds in the Supreme Court, but it was rejected by the court on 13 May 2020 stating that he did not need to be admitted to a hospital; however, the court scheduled a hearing of his regular bail plea in July. It later rejected another interim bail plea on 4 September and said he did not need to be admitted to a hospital, but stated it will hear his appeal after the courts resume their regular functioning which was affected due to the COVID-19 pandemic.

A special CBI court granted him bail in one case related to the 1984 genocide on 27 April 2022, however he remained in jail due to his conviction in another case related to the riots. The Delhi High Court however stayed his release in July 2022 after it was challenged by the Special Investigation Team investigating him.

On 12 February 2025, Kumar was convicted in a second case for instigating and participating in the murder of Jaswant Singh, and his son, Tarundeep Singh. The two Sikh men were assaulted by a mob of Indian National Congress supporters on 1 November 1984, doused with petrol and burnt alive. Kumar and his supporters also assaulted the wife and niece of Jaswant Singh who tried to protect the two men. 14 eyewitnesses testified against Kumar for his active role in leading the assault. He was given another life sentence for his role in the murders.

In January 2026, Kumar was acquitted in one of the cases pertaining to riots, with a Delhi court ruling that there was insufficient evidence to establish his guilt in the murders of Sohan Singh and his son-in-law Avtar Singh.

== Personal life ==
Sajjan Kumar was born on September 23, 1945, to Raghunath Singh and Mee Kaur in Delhi. Kumar belonged to the Jat caste. He was married to Ram Kaur, the couple are parents of one son and two daughters. He was the brother of Ramesh Kumar, who is also a politician.

=== Death ===
Kumar died on 20 August 2026, at the age of 80, after being admitted to Safdarjung Hospital in Delhi. He had a medical history of high blood pressure and Parkinson's disease. Kumar was cremated at the Nigambodh Ghat on 21 August, with a large number of people attending his funeral.

After Kumar's death, Congress MP Deepender Singh Hooda mourned his passing and praised his political career, triggering a protest led by Delhi Sikh Gurdwara Management Committee head Harmeet Singh Kalka, with the Sikh protesters burning Congress leader Rahul Gandhi's effigy outside his home. Hooda later expressed regret and claimed that his statement was distorted, while some leaders of the Congress from Haryana demanded action against him. Other Congress leaders from Haryana also paid tributes and mourned Kumar's passing, while Congress leaders from Punjab criticised him for his role in the anti-Sikh riots. Three BJP MPs from Delhi paid condolences at Kumar's house and were later reprimanded by the BJP lesdership. Members of AAP held protests against BJP over the three MPs condoling Kumar's passing.
