= 1991 Indian general election =

- 20 May, 12 June and 15 June 1991; 19 February 1992 (Punjab)

537 of the 543 seats in the Lok Sabha 269 seats needed for a majority
- Registered: 498,363,801
- Turnout: 56.73% (▼5.22pp)
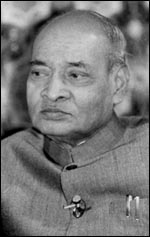

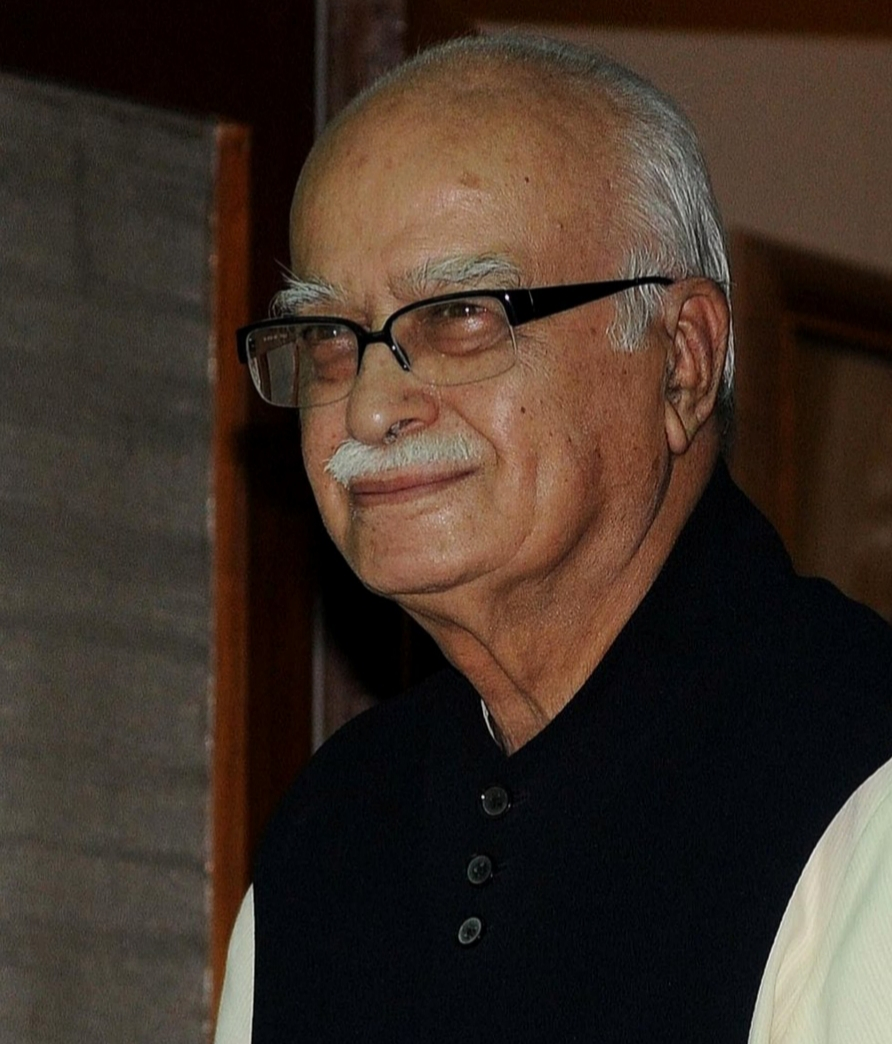

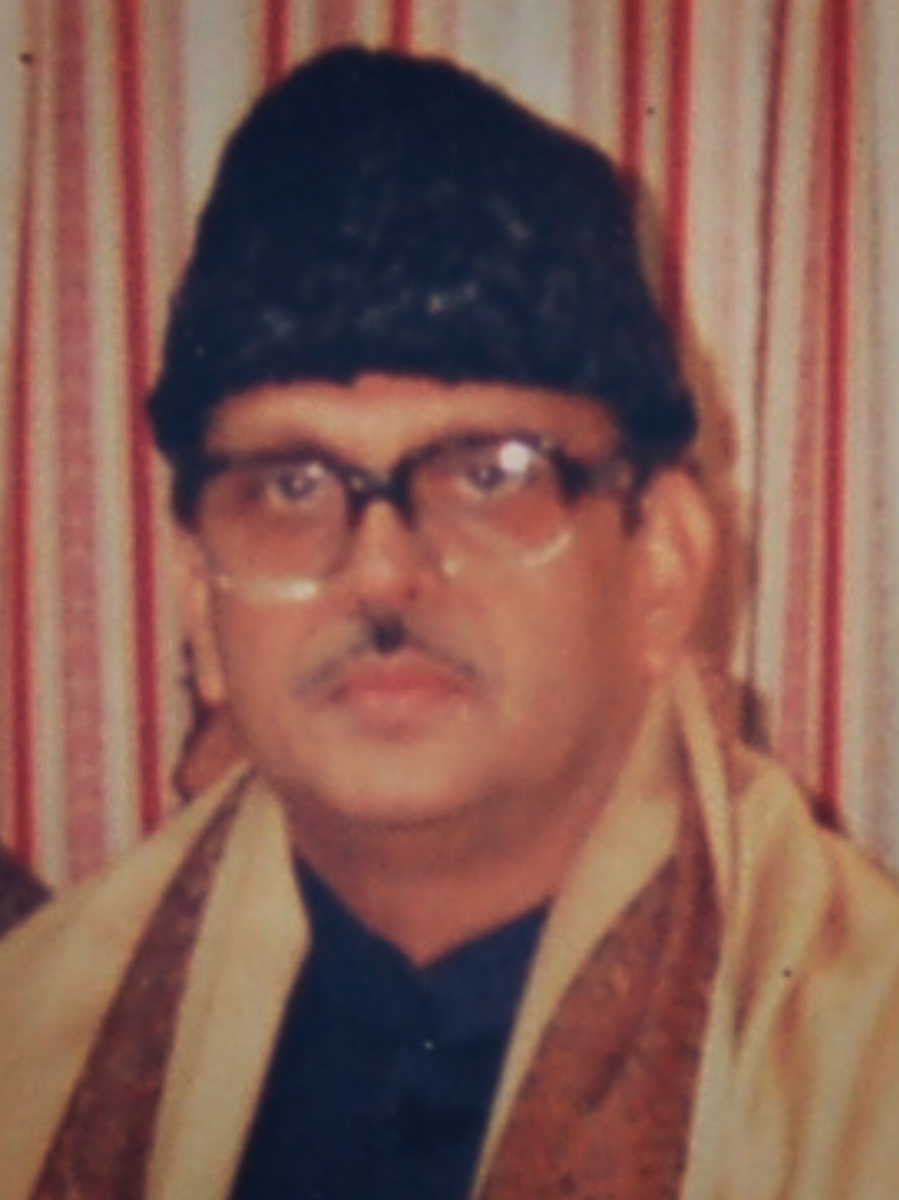

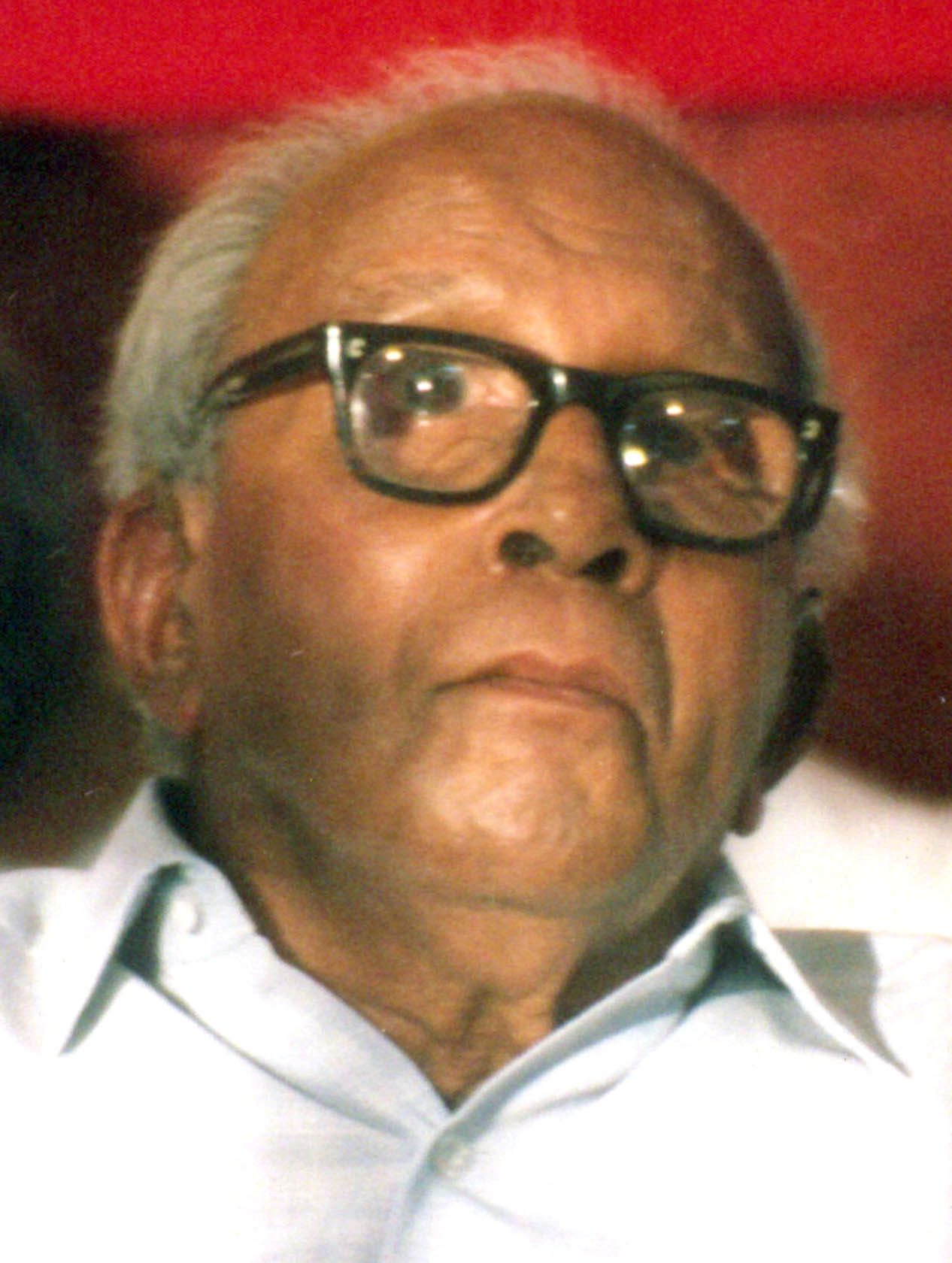
	First party	Second party
Leader	P. V. Narasimha Rao	L. K. Advani
Party	INC(I)	BJP
Last election	39.53%, 197 seats	11.36%, 85 seats
Seats won	244	120
Seat change	▲47	▲35
Popular vote	101,285,692	55,843,074
Percentage	36.26%	20.11%
Swing	▼3.27pp	▲8.75pp
Alliance seats	248	124
	Third party	Fourth party
Leader	V. P. Singh	E. M. S. Namboodiripad
Party	JD	CPI(M)
Alliance	NF	NF
Last election	17.79%, 143 seats	6.55%, 33 seats
Seats won	59	35
Seat change	▼84	▲2
Popular vote	32,628,400	16,954,797
Percentage	11.84%	6.16%
Swing	▼5.95pp	▼0.39 pp
Alliance seats	128
- Results by constituency
Prime Minister before election
Chandra Shekhar
SJP
Prime Minister after election
P. V. Narasimha Rao
INC(I)

General elections were held in India on 20 May, 12 June and 15 June 1991 to elect the members of the 10th Lok Sabha, although they were delayed until 19 February 1992 in Punjab.

No party won a majority in the Lok Sabha, resulting in the Indian National Congress (Indira) forming a minority government under new Prime Minister P. V. Narasimha Rao with the support of other parties. The government survived 28 July 1993 no confidence vote in controversial circumstances by bribing MPs from the Janata Dal and the Jharkhand Mukti Morcha.

Elections were not held for the six seats allocated to Jammu and Kashmir, nor for two seats in Bihar and one in Uttar Pradesh. Similarly, elections were also delayed in Punjab. Voter turnout was 57%, the lowest to date in an Indian general election.

== Background ==
In the previous elections held 16 months before, the Janata Dal came into power with outside support of the Bharatiya Janata Party. However, the BJP withdrew its support from the government after its Ram Rathyatra was stopped at Samastipur in Bihar, a state ruled by the Janata Dal, whose Chief Minister Lalu Prasad Yadav had the BJP president Lal Krishna Advani arrested on spot. Following the resignation of V. P. Singh, the main opposition party, the Indian National Congress (Indira) provided outside support to a small breakaway faction of the Janata Dal, the Samajwadi Janata Party headed by Chandra Shekhar for a time, but soon withdrew its support. Over 500 million eligible voters were once again given the chance to elect their government. The elections were held in a polarised environment and are also referred to as the 'Mandal-Mandir' elections after the two most important poll issues, the Mandal Commission fallout and the Ram Mandir-Babri Masjid issue.

=== Mandal-Mandir issue ===
While the Mandal Commission report released by the VP Singh government suggested giving 27 per cent reservation to the Other Backward Castes (OBCs) in government jobs, it led to widespread violence and protests across the country with many students from the Forward Caste groups in and around the capital city of Delhi even setting themselves on fire in opposition to increase in reservations. Violence also erupted between Scheduled Caste groups, who opposed increasing reservation for other communities & OBC groups, who supported reservation for their own community. 'Mandir' represented the hallmark of this election, where there was a debate over construction of Ram Mandir at the disputed site of the Babri Masjid in Ayodhya which the Hindu right wing Bharatiya Janata Party was using as its major election manifesto. To counter the intense religious polarisation unleashed due to the Ram mandir movement, the ruling Janata Dal heavily campaigned on implementing the Mandal Commission report, which the BJP alleged was a ploy to undermine Hindu unity.

The Mandir-Mandal issue led to numerous riots in many parts of the country and the electorate was polarised on caste and religious lines. With the Janata Dal beginning to fall apart into different splinter groups each supporting a particular caste in a specific state, the Congress (I) managed to make the most of the polarisation, by getting the most seats and forming a minority government.

=== Rajiv Gandhi assassination ===
A day after the first round of polling took place on 20 May, former prime minister Rajiv Gandhi was assassinated while campaigning for Margatham Chandrasekar in Sriperembudur. The remaining election days were postponed until mid-June and voting finally took place on 12 and 15 June.

Since the assassination took place after first phase of polling in 211 of 534 constituencies and the balance constituencies went to polls after the assassination, the 1991 results varied greatly between phases. After the assassination, voter sentiment shifted dramatically, many undecided and regional voters moved toward INC for stability. Congress (I) retained strong regional dominance in parts of India that voted in the first polling phase, and although Rajiv Gandhi's assassination affected public sentiment, it did not result in a national seat sweep in later phases,which included major states where BJP and Janata Dal won a large share of seats. The result was a Congress (I)-led minority government supported by the Janata Dal and led by P. V. Narasimha Rao, who had previously announced his retirement from politics. While Rao had not contested in the election, he contested in a by-election in Nandyal which he won by a record five lakh votes.

=== Jammu & Kashmir, Punjab ===
76 to 126 people were shot dead during the campaign on 17 June 1991 in two attacks by Khalistani gunmen in Punjab, an area racked by separatist violence since the 1980s. Police reports said the killings, on separate trains, were carried out by Sikh militants. Similarly, insurgency in Kashmir also saw the mass exodus of Kashmiri Hindus from the Kashmir Valley under threats from Pakistan-sponsored Muslim militants. Due to these insurgencies, no elections were held in Jammu and Kashmir and Punjab, a total of 19 Lok Sabha seats. Elections were held in Punjab on 19 February 1992, where INC won 12 out of 13 seats, thereby taking their tally in the Lok Sabha up from 232 to 244.

== Results ==
Party	Votes	%	Seats
Indian National Congress (Indira)	99,799,403	36.26	232
Bharatiya Janata Party	55,345,075	20.11	120
Janata Dal	32,589,180	11.84	59
Communist Party of India (Marxist)	16,954,797	6.16	35
Janata Party	9,267,096	3.37	5
Telugu Desam Party	8,223,271	2.99	13
Communist Party of India	6,851,114	2.49	14
Dravida Munnetra Kazhagam	5,741,910	2.09	0
All India Anna Dravida Munnetra Kazhagam	4,470,542	1.62	11
Bahujan Samaj Party	4,420,719	1.61	2
Shiv Sena	2,208,712	0.80	4
Revolutionary Socialist Party	1,749,730	0.64	4
Asom Gana Parishad	1,489,898	0.54	1
Jharkhand Mukti Morcha	1,481,900	0.54	6
Janata Dal (Gujarat)	1,399,702	0.51	1
Pattali Makkal Katchi	1,283,065	0.47	0
All India Forward Bloc	1,145,015	0.42	3
Indian Congress (Socialist) – Sarat Chandra Sinha	982,954	0.36	1
Indian Union Muslim League	845,418	0.31	2
Indian Peoples Front	644,891	0.23	0
Natun Asom Gana Parishad	494,628	0.18	0
Karnataka Rajya Ryota Sangha	490,275	0.18	0
Doordarshi Party	466,869	0.17	0
All India Majlis-e-Ittehadul Muslimeen	456,900	0.17	1
Kerala Congress (M)	384,255	0.14	1
Jharkhand Party	350,699	0.13	0
Haryana Vikas Party	331,794	0.12	1
Nagaland People's Council	328,015	0.12	1
Bharatiya Republican Paksha	327,941	0.12	0
Kerala Congress	319,933	0.12	0
Peasants and Workers Party of India	295,402	0.11	0
United Minorities Front, Assam	206,737	0.08	0
Lokdal	173,884	0.06	0
Marxist Co-ordination Committee	171,767	0.06	0
United Reservation Movement Council of Assam	170,376	0.06	0
Manipur Peoples Party	169,692	0.06	1
Autonomous State Demand Committee	139,785	0.05	1
Sanjukta Loka Parishad	125,738	0.05	0
Sikkim Sangram Parishad	106,247	0.04	1
Republican Party of India (Khobragade)	91,557	0.03	0
Shiromani Akali Dal (Simaranjit Singh Mann)	88,084	0.03	0
Plain Tribals Council of Assam	87,387	0.03	0
Mizo National Front	82,019	0.03	0
Sarv Jati Janata Parishad	70,368	0.03	0
Akhil Bharat Hindu Mahasabha	67,495	0.02	0
Maharashtrawadi Gomantak Party	64,752	0.02	0
Tharasu Makkal Mandram	55,165	0.02	0
Uttarakhand Kranti Dal	47,369	0.02	0
Marxist Communist Party of India (S.S. Srivastava)	43,085	0.02	0
Bharatiya Krishi Udyog Sangh	42,504	0.02	0
Jan Parishad	37,725	0.01	0
Republican Party of India	36,541	0.01	0
Amra Bangali	35,186	0.01	0
Indian Union Muslim League (IML)	31,387	0.01	0
Sampooran Kranti Das	29,647	0.01	0
Akhil Bharatiya Manav Seva Das	28,528	0.01	0
Uttar Pradesh Republican Party	28,379	0.01	0
Yuva Vikas Party	28,159	0.01	0
Communist Party of India (Marxist–Leninist)	27,730	0.01	0
Jawan Kisan Mazdoor Party	23,929	0.01	0
Proutist Bloc of India	22,734	0.01	0
Soshit Samaj Dal	19,925	0.01	0
Akhil Bharatiya Jansangh	19,243	0.01	0
Orissa Vikas Parishad	15,893	0.01	0
Hul Jharkhand Party	15,406	0.01	0
Socialist Party of India (Lohia)	12,928	0.00	0
Akhil Bharatiya Hindustani Krantikari Samajwadi Party	12,820	0.00	0
Dalit Panthers Party	11,967	0.00	0
Bharatiya Loktantrik Mazdoor Dal	10,837	0.00	0
Akhil Bharatiya Revolutionary Samaj Dal	8,825	0.00	0
Akhil Bhartiya Shivsena-Rashtrawadi	8,810	0.00	0
Asom Jatiyatabadi Dal	8,519	0.00	0
Ambedkar Makkal Iyakkam	8,252	0.00	0
Asom Jatiya Parishad	8,047	0.00	0
Socialist Party (Ramakant Pandey)	7,104	0.00	0
Akhil Bharatiya Pichhadavarg Party	6,897	0.00	0
All India Dalit Muslim Minorities Suraksha Mahasangh	5,888	0.00	0
Vidarbha Praja Party	5,597	0.00	0
Akhil Bharatiya Gram Parishad	5,521	0.00	0
Akhil Bhartiya Dharmnirpeksh Dal	5,436	0.00	0
Hindu Swaraj Sangathan	5,325	0.00	0
Republican Presidium Party of India	4,967	0.00	0
Surajya Party	4,705	0.00	0
Sarvodaya Party	4,642	0.00	0
Janata Dal (Samajwadi)	4,548	0.00	0
Deseeya Karshaka Party	4,508	0.00	0
Gondwana Party	3,605	0.00	0
Azad Hind Fauz (Rajkiya)	3,543	0.00	0
Samdarshi Party	2,921	0.00	0
Lok Party	2,873	0.00	0
Socialist League of India	2,852	0.00	0
All India Urdu Morcha	2,655	0.00	0
Akhil Bhartiya Ramrajya Parishad (Vasudev Shastri Atul)	2,519	0.00	0
All India Kisan Mazdoor Sabha	2,311	0.00	0
Pondicherry Mannila Makkal Munnani	2,259	0.00	0
Pandav Dal	2,213	0.00	0
Internationalist Democratic Party	2,078	0.00	0
Gomant Lok Party	1,983	0.00	0
Akhil Bharatiya Desh Bhakt Morcha	1,792	0.00	0
Workers Party of India	1,781	0.00	0
Nationalist Party	1,768	0.00	0
Marx Engles Leninist Commune Health Association	1,692	0.00	0
Nagaland Peoples Party	1,572	0.00	0
Adarsh Lok Dal	1,544	0.00	0
Desh Bhakt Party	1,521	0.00	0
Akhil Bharatiya Bharat Desham Party	1,466	0.00	0
Republican Party of India (Kamble)	1,300	0.00	0
Akhil Bharatiya Janhit Jagrati Party	1,245	0.00	0
Mukt Bharat	1,191	0.00	0
Rashtriya Krantikari Dal	1,125	0.00	0
Sampooran Rashtriya Sena	1,040	0.00	0
Gramma Munnetra Kazhagam	1,030	0.00	0
Navbharat Party	787	0.00	0
Labour Party of India (V.V. Prasad)	684	0.00	0
Thayaga Marumalrchi Kazhagam	665	0.00	0
Poorvanchal Rashtriya Congress	605	0.00	0
Jammu-Kashmir Panthers Party	587	0.00	0
Kannada Paksha	576	0.00	0
Akhil Bharatiya Mahila Dal	573	0.00	0
Socialist Revolutionary Party	571	0.00	0
Lokhit Morcha	532	0.00	0
Republican Party of India (Athawale)	521	0.00	0
Labour Party (Ashok Bhattacharjee)	434	0.00	0
Akhil Bharatiya Loktantra Party	408	0.00	0
Cheluva Kannad Nadu	383	0.00	0
Azad Party	372	0.00	0
Democratic Party of India	359	0.00	0
Bharatiya Backward Party	329	0.00	0
Hindu Shiv Sena (A.K. Brahmbatt)	325	0.00	0
Rashtriya Unnatsheel Das	316	0.00	0
Akhil Bharatiya Gram Parishad	314	0.00	0
Akhil Bharatiya Loktantric Alpsankhyak Janmorcha	257	0.00	0
Sr. Citizens National Party of India	250	0.00	0
Socialist Labour League	246	0.00	0
M.G.R. Munnetra Kazhagam	228	0.00	0
Mahabharat People's Party	225	0.00	0
Janata Congress Party of Bharatvarsha	194	0.00	0
Akhil Bhartiya Hindu Shakti Dal	193	0.00	0
Akhil Bharatiya Socialist Party	166	0.00	0
Kannada Desh Party	164	0.00	0
Bharatiya Dhruba Labour Party	142	0.00	0
Jai Mahakali Nigrani Samiti	138	0.00	0
Bhartiya Sangthit Nagrik Party	120	0.00	0
Vishal Bharat Party	56	0.00	0
Jan Ekata Morcha	34	0.00	0
Independents	11,441,688	4.16	1
Nominated Anglo-Indians			2
Total	275,206,990	100.00	523
Valid votes	275,206,990	97.35	
Invalid/blank votes	7,493,952	2.65	
Total votes	282,700,942	100.00	
Registered voters/turnout	498,363,801	56.73	
Source: ECI

=== Delayed elections in Punjab ===
Party	Votes	%	Seats
Indian National Congress (Indira)	1,486,289	49.27	12
Bahujan Samaj Party	594,628	19.71	1
Bharatiya Janata Party	497,999	16.51	0
Communist Party of India (Marxist)	119,902	3.98	0
Shiromani Akali Dal (Simaranjit Singh Mann)	77,970	2.58	0
Communist Party of India	47,226	1.57	0
Janata Dal	39,220	1.30	0
Janata Party	27,966	0.93	0
Lokdal	2,839	0.09	0
Bharatiya Krishi Udyog Sangh	1,349	0.04	0
Independents	121,009	4.01	0
Total	3,016,397	100.00	13
Valid votes	3,016,397	95.59	
Invalid/blank votes	139,126	4.41	
Total votes	3,155,523	100.00	
Registered voters/turnout	13,169,797	23.96	
Source: ECI

=== Results by state/union territory ===
District	Seats					
District	Seats	INC	BJP	JND	Left	OTH
A & N Islands	1	1	—N/a	—N/a	—N/a	—N/a
Andhra Pradesh	42	25	1	—N/a	2	14
Arunachal Pradesh	2	2	—N/a	—N/a	—N/a	—N/a
Assam	14	8	2	—N/a	1	3
Bihar	52	1	5	31	9	6
Chandigarh	1	1	—N/a	—N/a	—N/a	—N/a
D & N Haveli	1	1	—N/a	—N/a	—N/a	—N/a
Daman and Diu	1	—N/a	1	—N/a	—N/a	—N/a
Goa	2	2	—N/a	—N/a	—N/a	—N/a
Gujarat	26	5	20	—N/a	—N/a	1
Haryana	10	9	—N/a	—N/a	—N/a	1
Himachal Pradesh	4	2	2	—N/a	—N/a	—N/a
Karnataka	28	23	4	—N/a	—N/a	1
Kerala	20	13	—N/a	—N/a	3	4
Lakshadweep	1	1	—N/a	—N/a	—N/a	—N/a
Madhya Pradesh	40	27	12	—N/a	—N/a	1
Maharashtra	48	38	5	—N/a	1	4
Manipur	2	1	—N/a	—N/a	—N/a	1
Meghalaya	2	2	—N/a	—N/a	—N/a	—N/a
Mizoram	1	1	—N/a	—N/a	—N/a	—N/a
Nagaland	1	—N/a	—N/a	—N/a	—N/a	1
Delhi	7	2	5	—N/a	—N/a	—N/a
Odisha	21	13	—N/a	6	2	—N/a
Pondicherry	1	1	—N/a	—N/a	—N/a	—N/a
Punjab	13	12	—N/a	—N/a	—N/a	1
Rajasthan	25	13	12	—N/a	—N/a	—N/a
Sikkim	1	—N/a	—N/a	—N/a	—N/a	1
Tamil Nadu	39	28	—N/a	—N/a	—N/a	11
Tripura	2	2	—N/a	—N/a	—N/a	—N/a
Uttar Pradesh	84	5	51	22	1	5
West Bengal	42	5	—N/a	—N/a	37	—N/a
Total	534	244	120	59	56	55

== Aftermath ==
Congress (I) was in a position to form government. The persons, mentioned in media, as probable prime minister, were:

- Former Home, and Foreign minister P. V. Narasimha Rao
- Chief Minister of Maharashtra Sharad Pawar
- Former Chief Minister of Madhya Pradesh Arjun Singh
- Former Finance, and Foreign minister N. D. Tiwari

At the suggestion of Rajiv's wife Sonia, P. V. Narasimha Rao was chosen as the prime-ministerial candidate of Congress (Indira). Rao, who was by-elected from Nandyal, secured the outside support of the Janata Dal & Jharkhand Mukti Morcha under controversial circumstances. After Lal Bahadur Shastri, Rao was the second Congress Prime Minister from outside the Nehru-Gandhi family and the second Congress Prime Minister to head a minority government that completed full 5-year term (Indira Gandhi also headed a minority government from 1969 to 1971 following the 1969 split of the Congress party into Congress(O) & Congress(R)).

== See also ==
- List of members of the 10th Lok Sabha
- 1991 Indian general election by state or union territory
- 1992 Indian general election in Punjab
