= 1972 Delhi Metropolitan Council election =

Union territory elections in India

- 11 March 1972

56 of 61 seats in the Delhi Metropolitan Council 31 seats needed for a majority
- Registered: 2,068,437
- Turnout: 68.86%

	Majority party	Minority party
Party	INC	ABJS
Seats won	44	5
Elected Chairman of the Council
INC

Delhi Metropolitan Council election, 1972 was held in Indian National Capital Territory of Delhi to elect 56 councillors to the Delhi Metropolitan Council. This council had no legislative powers, but only an advisory role in administration of the territory.

== Results ==
Summary of results of the Delhi Legislative Assembly election, 1972
Party	Candidates	Seats won	Votes	Vote%
Indian National Congress	52	44	681,324	48.54%
Bharatiya Jana Sangh	56	5	540,069	38.47%
Communist Party of India	4	3	54,183	3.86%
Congress (O)	19	2	27,540	1.96%
Independent	104	2	78,208	5.57%
Total	-	56	-	-

== Elected members ==
Constituency	Reserved for (SC/None)	Member	Party
Sarojini Nagar	None	P. N. Singh	Indian National Congress
Lakshmi Bai Nagar	None	Arjun Das	Indian National Congress
Gole Market	None	Asoke Chatterjee	Indian National Congress
Prithvi Raj Road	None	Pushpa Devi Gupta	Indian National Congress
Barakhamba	None	A. L. Ralia Ram	Indian National Congress
Minto Road	None	Surinder Saini	Indian National Congress
Jangpura	None	Jag Pravesh Chander	Indian National Congress
Kasturba Nagar	SC	C. L. Balmiki	Indian National Congress
Lajpat Nagar	None	Archna	Indian National Congress
Kalkaji	None	V. P. Singh	Indian National Congress
Ramakrishnapuram	None	Jagdish Chander	Indian National Congress
Delhi Cantonment	None	Brij Lal Dua	Indian National Congress
Rajinder Nagar	None	Thakur Das	Indian National Congress
Ashok Nagar	None	Rajander Kumar Tanwar	Indian National Congress
Subhash Nagar	None	Manmohan Singh	Indian National Congress
Moti Nagar	None	K. C. Malik	Indian National Congress
Shakurbasti	None	Srichand	Communist Party of India
Badli	SC	Mool Chand	Indian National Congress
Narela	None	Heera Singh	Indian National Congress
Bawana	None	Tek Chand	Independent
Nangloi	None	Chaudhary Bharat Singh	Indian National Congress
Najafgarh	None	Hukam Singh	Indian National Congress
Palam	None	Mange Ram	Indian National Congress
Tughlaqabad	SC	Prem Singh	Indian National Congress
Geeta Colony	None	Brij Lal Goswami	Indian National Congress
Gandhi Nagar	None	Inder Singh Azad	Indian National Congress
Shahdara	None	Ram Narain	Indian National Congress
Ghonda	None	Hargain Singh	Indian National Congress
Vijay Nagar	None	B.d. Wadhwa	Indian National Congress
Kamla Nagar	None	Purushotam Lal Goel	Indian National Congress
Timarpur	None	Amar Nath Malhotra	Indian National Congress
Kashmere Gate	None	Om Prakash Behl	Indian National Congress
Chandni Chowk	None	Rama Shanker	Indian National Congress
Darya Ganj	None	Dalit Kumar Tandan	Bharatiya Jana Sangh
Dariba	None	Mehtab Chand Jain	Indian National Congress
Matia Mahal	None	Sikander Bakht	Indian National Congress
Chawri Bazar	None	Anwar Ali Dhehlvi	Bharatiya Jana Sangh
Ballimaran	None	Mohd. Ahmed	Independent
Ajmeri Gate	None	Mirza Siddiq Ali	Indian National Congress
Kalan Masjid	None	Rajesh Sharma	Indian National Congress
Paharganj	None	Madan Lal Khurana	Bharatiya Jana Sangh
Ram Nagar	None	Satya Prakash	Indian National Congress
Basti Julahan	SC	Prabhu Dayal	Indian National Congress
Qasab Pura	None	Roshan Lal	Indian National Congress
Deputy Ganj	None	Shyam Chanran Gupta	Bharatiya Jana Sangh
Pratap Nagar	None	Ved Parkash	Indian National Congress
Arya Pura	None	Ram Chander Sharma	Communist Party of India
Shakti Nagar	None	Radhey Lal	Indian National Congress
Sarai Rohilla	None	Iqbal Krishna Trehan	Indian National Congress
Kishan Ganj	None	B.d. Joshit	Communist Party of India
Motia Khan	None	Bansilal Chauhan	Indian National Congress
Tibbia College	None	R. P. Mittal	Indian National Congress
Rehgarpura	SC	Sunder Wati N Parbhaker	Indian National Congress
Dev Nagar	SC	Moti Lal Bokalia	Indian National Congress
Patel Nagar	None	Vijay Kumar Malhotra	Bharatiya Jana Sangh
Anand Parbat	SC	Krishan Swarup	Indian National Congress

=== Executive Council members ===
Name	Role
Mir Mustaq Ahmed	Chairman
Jag Parvesh Chandra	Dy. Chairman
Radha Raman	C.E.C
O.P.Behl	E.C. (CS)
Mange Ram	E.C. (Fin)
Hira Singh	E.C. (Rev.)
Rajni Kant	Secretary
