= 1967 Delhi Metropolitan Council election =

Union territory elections in India

February 1967	1972 →

56 of 61 seats in the Delhi Metropolitan Council 31 seats needed for a majority
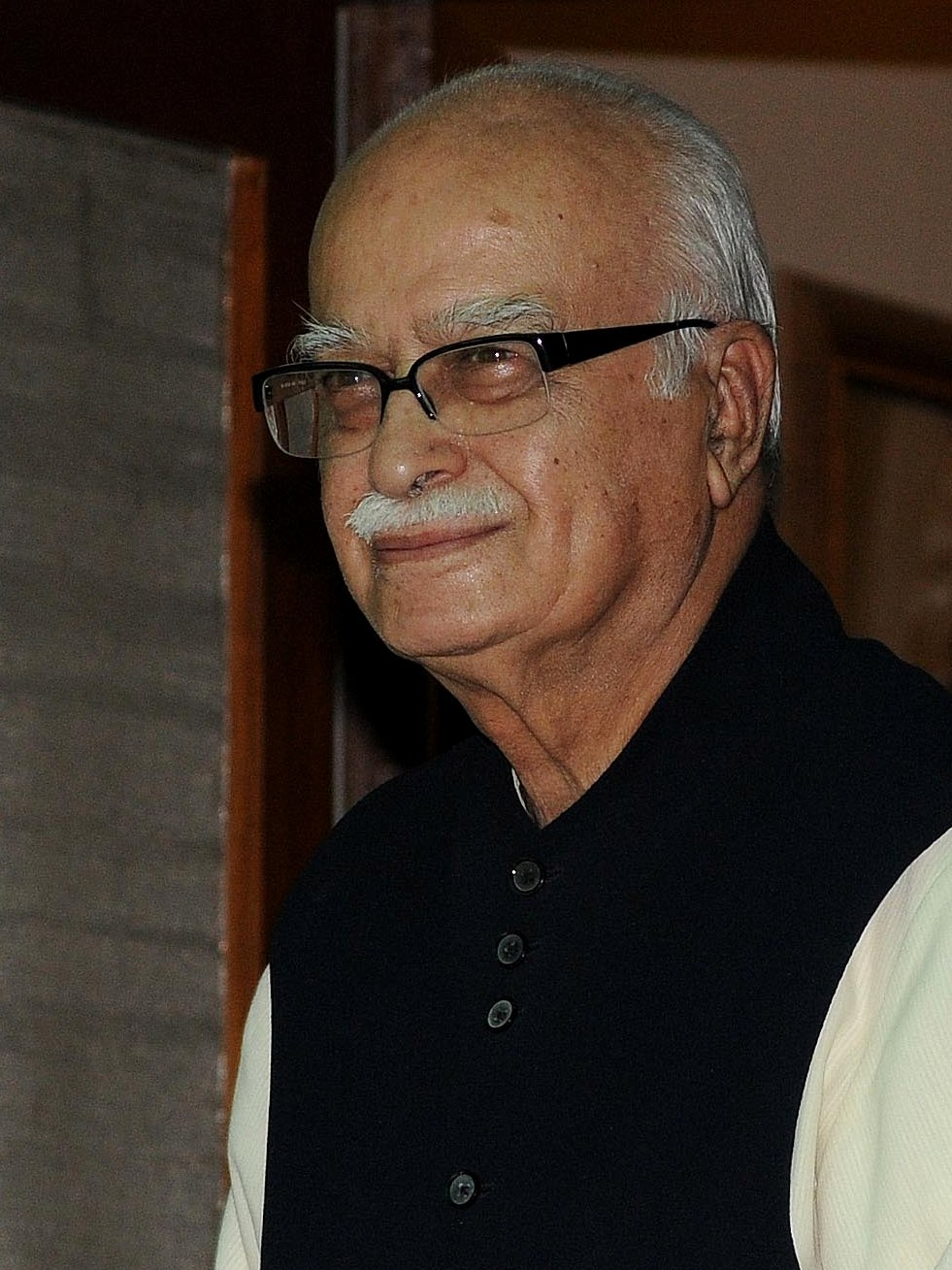
	Majority party	Minority party	Third party
		INC	RPI
Leader	L. K. Advani
Party	ABJS	INC	RPI
Seats before	New	New	New
Seats won	33	19	2
Seat change	New	New	New
Elected Chairman of the Council
L. K. Advani
ABJS

The first elections for the Delhi Metropolitan Council were held in Indian National Capital Territory of Delhi in February 1967. L. K. Advani of the Bharatiya Jana Sangh was sworn in as the Chairman of the Council.

On 1 November 1956, under States Reorganisation Act, 1956, Delhi was converted from a state to a Union Territory. This resulted in the dissolution of the Delhi Legislative Assembly. In September 1966, with the passing of The Delhi Administration Act, 1966, the Delhi Metropolitan Council came into being, with 56 elected and five nominated members with the Lt. Governor of Delhi as its head. The Council however had no legislative powers, only an advisory role in the governance of Delhi. This set up functioned until 1990.

== Results ==
Party	Seats		
Party	Elected	Nominated	Total
Bharatiya Jana Sangh	33	2	35
Indian National Congress	19	2	21
Republican Party of India	2	0	2
Independents	2	1	3
Total	56	5	61
Source: Parveen, Delhi Gazetteer

== Executive Council members ==
Name	Role
L. K. Advani	Chairman
Shyam Charan Gupta	Dy. Chairman
Janardhan Gupta	Dy. Chairman
Vijay Kumar Malhotra	C.E.C
Ram Lal Verma	E.C. (CS)
Amar Chand Shubh	E.C. (Fin)
Shiv Narain Sarsonia	E.C. (Rev.)
R.K.Baweja	Secretary

== See also ==
- 1967 elections in India
