= Tarif Singh =

Indian politician

Ch.Tarif Singh
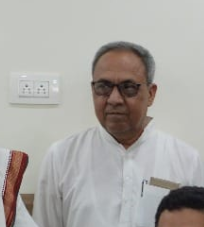
- Singh at his residence

Member of Parliament, Lok Sabha
- In office 1989-1991
- Preceded by: Chaudhary Bharat Singh
- Succeeded by: Sajjan Kumar
- Constituency: Outer Delhi

Personal details
- Born: age not known Sultanpur Majra, Delhi, British India
- Party: Janata Dal
- Other political affiliations: Lok Dal,

Tarif Singh (तारीफ सिंह), is an Indian politician. He was elected to Lok Sabha from Outer Delhi (9th Lok Sabha : 2 December 1989 – 13 March 1991) under the Janata Dal government.

== Political career ==
In 1977, he was elected as a Pradhan Gramsabha, Village Sultanpur Mazra.

=== 1978 - 1980 ===
He was Chairman of the Agriculture Produce Market Committee (APMC), Najafgarh, Delhi.

=== 1984 - 1987 ===
In 1984 Lok Sabha elections, he was defeated by Ch. Bharat Singh. He became President of Lok Dal Delhi Pradesh, Delhi in 1985 and held this position till 1987.

=== 1989 - 1991 ===
Tarif Singh contested and won Lok Sabha elections from Delhi's Outer Delhi seat.

=== 1994 ===
Joined Indian National Congress along with Ajit Singh (politician) (son of Ch. Charan Singh). He was Vice President of Delhi Pradesh Congress Committee between 1995 and 1997. But never contested on their ticket.

=== 2000 - 2003 ===
He served as Chairman of Swami Shraddhanand College, Alipur affiliated to University of Delhi.

=== 2003 - Present ===
Ch. Tarif Singh retired.
