= Chaudhary Bharat Singh =

Indian politician

Member of Parliament, Lok Sabha
- In office 1984-1989
- Preceded by: Sajjan Kumar
- Succeeded by: Tarif Singh
- Constituency: Outer Delhi (Lok Sabha Constituency)

Personal details
- Born: Nilothi, Delhi
- Party: Congress party

Chaudhary Bharat Singh Shokeen (born 14 January 1915 in Nilothi, Delhi was an Indian politician, he was a member of Delhi Metropolitan Council (equivalent to MLA) for 4 terms and a former member of parliament in the 8th Lok Sabha (1984-1989) from the Outer Delhi constituency, which was one of the largest constituencies not only in Delhi but also in the country. It was abolished in 2008.

Born in a farmers' family to Late Chaudhary Phool Singh he always had the qualities to become a successful mass leader and serve the people. He took part in India's freedom struggle before his rise in his political career. He had been Pradhan of his village Nilothi in 1954 before entering the world of politics in 1967 where the people made him win by a big margin on the Congress' ticket. He then won the 1972, 1977 and the 1983 Delhi Metropolitan Council elections continuously, His win in the Councillor's election on Congress (I) ticket given to him in 1977 made his political stature even bigger, because even Indira Gandhi had lost her seat during that time. He also had a key role in controlling the Delhi riots in 1984. Singh was the first to receive Kisan Award from the President of India. Singh was famous in Delhi by the name of Jat Gandhi. .

He died on 19 Apr 2008 at the age of 93.

== Political career ==
=== 1952 ===
Pradhan of Nangloi Block Congress.

=== 1954 ===
In 1954 he was made the Sarpanch of Village Nilothi and Village Kamruddin Nagar in Delhi.

=== 1959 ===
President - Delhi state cooperative federation

=== 1960 ===
Director - Agriculture Production Marketing Committee

=== 1967,1972,1977,1983 ===
Remained a member of Delhi Metropolitan Council(equivalent to MLA) during these years.

=== 1984 ===
Member of Parliament, 8th Lok Sabha (1984-1989) from Outer Delhi constituency
