= Kalka Dass =

Indian politician

Kalka Dass is a former member of Lok Sabha. He is a leader of Bharatiya Janata party and among the originator of the party. He represented Karol Bagh of Delhi in 9th Lok Sabha and 10th Lok Sabha. He was Chairman of Delhi Metropolitan Council in 1977–80 as well as Leader of the Opposition from 1985 to 1989. He was first person of Bharatiya Janata party who pitched for a full state in Delhi in 1988.
