= Delhi Metropolitan Council =

Autonomous administrative division

Type
- Type: Autonomous administrative council of the Union Territory of Delhi

History
- Founded: 1966
- Disbanded: 1990
- Preceded by: Delhi Legislative Assembly
- Succeeded by: Delhi Legislative Assembly

Structure
- Seats: 61 Councillors
- Political groups: Elected (56) Nominated (5)

Elections
- Voting system: Plurality voting

Meeting place
- Old Secretariat, Delhi, India

The Delhi Metropolitan Council was a council that existed between 1966 and 1990 that administered the Union Territory of Delhi, India. The council had 56 elected and 5 nominated members, and was headed by a Chief Executive Councillor.

== History ==
The States Reorganisation Commission, set up in 1953, led to the Constitutional amendment through States Reorganisation Act, 1956, which came into effect on 1 November 1956. This meant that Delhi was no longer a Part-C State and was made a Union Territory under the direct administration of the President of India. Also the Delhi Legislative Assembly and the Council of Ministers were abolished simultaneously. Subsequently, the Delhi Municipal Corporation Act, 1957 was enacted which led to the formation the Municipal Corporation.

Then, in September 1966, with "The Delhi Administration Act, 1966", the assembly was replaced by the Delhi Metropolitan Council with 56 elected and five nominated members with the Lt. Governor of Delhi as its head. The Council however had no legislative powers, only an advisory role in the governance of Delhi. This set up functioned until 1990.

== Councils ==
=== List of Chairman of Delhi Metropolitan Council ===
No	Name	Term of office			Party	Council (Election)
1.	Jag Parvesh Chandra	3 October 1966	27 March 1967	175 days	Indian National Congress	Interim Council
2.	L. K. Advani	28 March 1967	19 April 1970	3 years, 22 days	Bharatiya Jana Sangh	First Council (1967)
3.	Shyam Charan Gupta	19 April 1970	19 March 1972	1 year, 335 days	Bharatiya Jana Sangh	First Council (1967)
4.	Mir Mushtaq Ahmed	20 March 1972	27 June 1977	5 years, 99 days	Indian National Congress	Second Council (1972)
5.	Kalka Dass	28 June 1977	17 March 1983	5 years, 263 days	Janata Party	Third Council (1977)
6.	Purushottam Goyel	18 March 1983	14 December 1989	6 years, 271 days	Indian National Congress	Fourth Council (1983)

Council	Chairman	Deputy Chairman	Chief Executive Councillor	Executive Councillors	Secretary
Interim (1966-1967)	Jag Parvesh Chandra (3.10.66 to 27.3.1967)	Vacant	Mir Mustaq Ahmed	H.K.L.Bhagat, Radha Raman, Bhiku Ram Jain,	R.K. Baweja (1966-1970)
First Council (1967–1972)	L. K. Advani (28 March 1967 to 19 April 1970)	Shyam Charan Gupta	Vijay Kumar Malhotra	Ram Lal Verma, Amar Chand Shubh, Shiv Narain Sarsonia	R.K. Baweja (1966-1970)
First Council (1967–1972)	Shyam Charan Gupta ( 19 April 1970 to 19 March 1972)	Janardhan Gupta	Vijay Kumar Malhotra	Ram Lal Verma, Amar Chand Shubh, Shiv Narain Sarsonia	Desh Deepak (1970-1972)
Second Council (1972–1977)	Mir Mustaq Ahmed (20.3.1972 to 27.6.1977)	Jag Parvesh Chandra	Radha Raman	Mange Ram (1972–1973), Hira Singh (1973–1977), O.P.Behl (1972–1977)	Desh Deepak (1970–72), Rajni Kant (1973-75), Sunder Lal Bhargava (1975), T.R. Kalia (1975–77), M.K.Chawla ( 1977–78)
Third Council (1977–1980)	Kalka Dass (28.6.77 to 17.3.83) Chairman	Begum Khurshid Kidwai ( 1977–1980) Dy. Chairperson	Kidar Nath Sahni C.E.C	Madan Lal Khurana, Rajesh Sharma, Fateh Singh	G.C.Jain (1978–79) N.C.Kochhar (1979–83)
Fourth Council (1983–1990)	Purushottam Goyel (18.3.83 onwards) Chairman	Tajdar Babar (1983 onwards) Dy. Chairperson	Jag Parvesh Chandra C.E.C	Bansi lal Chauhan E.C. (Health), Prem Singh E.C. (Dev.), Kulanand Bhartiya E.C. (Edn.)	Lokeshwar Prasad ( 1983–85), B.S.Chaudhary (1985 -1990)

== See also ==
- Autonomous administrative divisions of India
