= Delhi Sadar Lok Sabha constituency =

Former constituency of the Indian parliament in Delhi

Coordinates: 28.6°N 77.2°E

Delhi Sadar
- Former Lok Sabha constituency

Constituency details
- Country: India
- Region: North India
- Union Territory: Delhi
- Established: 1952
- Abolished: 2008

Delhi Sadar Lok Sabha constituency was one of the Lok Sabha (parliamentary) constituencies in the National Capital Territory of Delhi from 1956 to 2008.

== Assembly segments ==
From 1966 to 1993, Delhi Sadar Lok Sabha constituency comprised the following Delhi Metropolitan Council segments:

1. Moti Nagar
2. Kamla Nagar
3. Vijay Nagar
4. Model Town
5. Deputy Ganj
6. Sohan Ganj
7. Shakti Nagar
8. Karampura

From 1993 to 2008, it comprised the following Delhi Vidhan Sabha segments:

1. Timarpur (Polling stations 1-45, 47–96)
2. Model Town (Polling stations 1–102)
3. Kamla Nagar
4. Sadar Bazar
5. Moti Nagar (Polling stations 1–106, 110–117)

== Members of Lok Sabha ==
Election	Member	Party
1952	Does not exist	
1957	Chaudhary Brahm Prakash	Indian National Congress
1962	Shiv Charan Gupta	Indian National Congress
1967	Kanwar Lal Gupta	Bharatiya Jana Sangh
1971	A. N. Chawla	Indian National Congress (R)
1977	Kanwar Lal Gupta	Janata Party
1980	Jagdish Tytler	Indian National Congress
1984	Jagdish Tytler	Indian National Congress
1989	Vijay Kumar Malhotra	Bharatiya Janata Party
1991	Jagdish Tytler	Indian National Congress
1996	Vijay Goel	Bharatiya Janata Party
1998	Madan Lal Khurana	Bharatiya Janata Party
1999	Madan Lal Khurana	Bharatiya Janata Party
2004	Jagdish Tytler	Indian National Congress
2009-Onwards	Does not exist	

== Election result ==
=== 1967 Lok Sabha Elections ===
- Kanwar Lal Gupta (Bharatiya Jana Sangh) : 73,801 votes
- Amar Nath Chawla (INC) : 64,096 votes

=== 1971 Lok Sabha Elections ===
- Amar Nath Chawla (INC) : 98,108 votes
- Kanwar Lal Gupta (Bharatiya Jana Sangh) : 55305

=== 2004 ===
2004 Indian general elections: Delhi Sadar
Party	Candidate	Votes	%	±%
INC	Jagdish Tytler	140,073		
BJP	Vijay Goel	124,099		
Margin of victory		16,064		
Turnout				
INC gain from BJP		Swing		

== See also ==
- List of former constituencies of the Lok Sabha
- Delhi City (Lok Sabha constituency)
- North East Delhi (Lok Sabha constituency)
