= Karol Bagh Lok Sabha constituency =

Parliamentary constituency of Delhi, India (1961–2008)

Coordinates: 28.65°N 77.19°E

Karol Bagh
- Former Lok Sabha constituency

Constituency details
- Country: India
- Region: North India
- Union Territory: Delhi
- Established: 1952
- Abolished: 2009

Karol Bagh Lok Sabha constituency was a Lok Sabha (parliamentary) constituency in the Indian National Capital Territory of Delhi. This constituency came into existence in 1961. It was abolished after the recommendations of the Delimitation Commission were approved by the presidential notification on 19 February 2008. This constituency was reserved for the candidates belonging to the scheduled castes.

== Assembly segments ==
From 1966 to 1993, Karol Bagh Lok Sabha constituency comprised the following Delhi Metropolitan Council segments:

1. Rajinder Nagar
2. Ramnagar
3. Sarai Rohilla
4. Motia Khan
5. Dev Nagar
6. Patel Nagar
7. Anand Parbat
8. Shadipur

From 1993 to 2008, it comprised the following Delhi Vidhan Sabha segments:

1. Patel Nagar
2. Rajinder Nagar
3. Karol Bagh
4. Ram Nagar (Polling stations 1-103)
5. Baljit Nagar
6. Moti Nagar (Polling stations 107, 108 and 109)

== Members of Parliament ==
Election	Member	Party
1951–1961	Constituency did not exist	
1962	Naval Prabhakar	Indian National Congress
1967	Ram Swarup Vidyarthi	Bharatiya Jana Sangh
1971	T. Sohan Lal	Indian National Congress
1977	Shiv Narain Sarsonia	Janata Party
1980	Dharam Dass Shastri	Indian National Congress (Indira)
1984	Sunderwati Nawal Prabhakar	Indian National Congress
1989	Kalka Dass	Bharatiya Janata Party
1991	Kalka Dass	Bharatiya Janata Party
1996	Meira Kumar	Indian National Congress
1998	Meira Kumar	Indian National Congress
1999	Dr. Anita Arya	Bharatiya Janata Party
2004	Krishna Tirath	Indian National Congress
2009 onward	Constituency does not exist	

== See also ==
- Karol Bagh
- West Delhi (Lok Sabha constituency)
- List of former constituencies of the Lok Sabha
