= Outer Delhi Lok Sabha constituency =

Lok Sabha constituency

Coordinates: 28.6°N 77.1°E

Outer Delhi
- Former Lok Sabha constituency

Constituency details
- Country: India
- Region: North India
- Union Territory: Delhi
- Established: 1952
- Abolished: 2008

Outer Delhi was a Lok Sabha (parliamentary) constituency in the Indian national capital territory of Delhi. It was one of the largest constituencies in India. It was abolished in 2008.

== Assembly segments ==
From 1966 to 1993, Outer Delhi Lok Sabha constituency comprised the following Delhi Metropolitan Council segments:

- Shakur Basti
- Rampura
- Bawana
- Najafgarh
- Madipur
- Palam
- Mehrauli
- Tughlaqabad

From 1993 to 2008, it comprised the following Delhi Vidhan Sabha segments:

- Madipur
- Tri Nagar
- Shakurbasti
- Shalimar Bagh
- Badli
- Sahibabad Daulatpur
- Bawana
- Sultanpur Majra
- Mangolpuri
- Vishnu Garden
- Hastsal
- Najafgarh
- Nasirpur
- Palam
- Mahipalpur
- Mehrauli
- Saket
- Dr. Ambedkar Nagar
- Tughlakabad
- Badarpur
- Malviya Nagar (Polling stations 61–70)
- Janak Puri (Polling stations 92–124)
- Narela (Polling stations 65–69)
- Bhalswa Jahangirpur (Polling stations 1 and 2)

== Members of Parliament ==
Lok Sabha	Duration	Member	Party
First	1952–57	C. Krishnan Nair	Indian National Congress
First	1952–57	Naval Prabhakar	Indian National Congress
Second	1957–62	C. Krishnan Nair	Indian National Congress
Second	1957–62	Naval Prabhakar	Indian National Congress
Third	1962–67	Chaudhary Brahm Prakash	Indian National Congress
Fourth	1967–71	Chaudhary Brahm Prakash	Indian National Congress
Fifth	1971–77	Chaudhry Dalip Singh	Indian National Congress
Sixth	1977–80	Chaudhary Brahm Prakash	Janata Party
Seventh	1980–84	Sajjan Kumar	Indian National Congress (I)
Eighth	1984–89	Chaudhary Bharat Singh	Indian National Congress
Ninth	1989–91	Tarif Singh	Janata Dal
Tenth	1991–96	Sajjan Kumar	Indian National Congress
Eleventh	1996–98	Krishan Lal Sharma	Bharatiya Janata Party
Twelfth	1998–99	Krishan Lal Sharma	Bharatiya Janata Party
Thirteenth	1999–2004	Sahib Singh Verma	Bharatiya Janata Party
Fourteenth	2004–09	Sajjan Kumar	Indian National Congress
Fifteenth	2009–Onward	Does not exist	

== Election results ==
=== 2004 ===
2004 Indian general elections: Outer Delhi
Party	Candidate	Votes	%	±%
INC	Sajjan Kumar	855,543	55.06	
BJP	Sahib Singh Verma	6,31,753	40.66	
BSP	Bharat Bhushan Nagar	33,495	2.16	
Independent	Sajjan Kumar	4,052	0.26	
Independent	Amarjeet Kaur	3,772	0.24	
Majority		2,23,790	14.40	
Turnout		15,53,849	46.13	
INC gain from BJP		Swing		

=== 13th Lok Sabha: 1999 General Elections ===
1999 Indian general election: Outer Delhi
Party	Candidate	Votes	%	±%
BJP	Sahib Singh Verma	7,09,692	55.12	
INC	Deepchand Sharma	5,07,220	39.40	
BSP	Brahm Singh Bidhuri	41,911	3.26	
Majority		2,02,472	15.72	
Turnout		12,87,504	41.49	
BJP gain from INC		Swing		

== See also ==
- List of former constituencies of the Lok Sabha
- North West Delhi (Lok Sabha constituency)
