= Kisan Mehta =

Indian activist

Kisan Mehta (31 August 1924 – 7 March 2015) was an Indian activist and Founder President of Save Bombay Committee and Prakruti, nonprofits based in India.

== Biography ==
Kisan Mehta was born on 31 August 1924. He has a BA Hons in History & Economics, a LL.B from the Bombay University and Diplomas in Electrical Engineering and Prestressed Concrete.

== Freedom struggle ==
He was a Freedom Fighter participating in the Quit India Movement launched by Mahatma Gandhi in 1942. During this struggle, at the age of 17, he was arrested and imprisoned in the Yerawada Central Jail, Pune for eight months in 1943.

=== Indian National Exhibition ===
On release from the prison in 1943, he conceived and developed the Indian National Exhibition depicting the history of the Indian peoples' struggle for freedom beginning with the First War of Independence in 1857 and ending with the Quit India movement that culminated in Indians getting freedom on 15 August 1947. The exhibition of posters, illustrations, translates was first inaugurated by Jayaprakash Narayan on the eve of independence in May 1947. The Exhibition toured the country including would be Pakistan areas during the years 1947–50 to be inaugurated by Pandit Jawaharlal Nehru, Sardar Vallabhbhai Patel, Maulana Azad, Achyut Patwardan, Kamala Devi, etc., at various locations in India viewed by about 5 million visitors.

== Indian nationalism post-independence ==
=== Himalaya Hamara exhibition ===
He conceived and completed "Himalaya Hamara Exhibition" in 1963 at the time of the Sino-Indian War depicting the importance of the Himalaya to India and its people The exhibition, put up in the Cross Maidan near Churchgate and Flora Fountain, was spread on 50,000 sq metres of land and had a model of Himalaya measuring 150 metres by 80 metres and 10 metres high. It was viewed by 2 million visitors in 60 days. While presenting difficulties in defending the snow-clad Himalaya due to the terrain, the Exhibition showed the relevance and value of the Himalaya to India and called upon Indians to raise against the aggression and offer their supreme for the defence of Himalaya, which is an eternal source of spiritual, cultural, religious social values for people of Indian sub-continent.

== Public service ==
He was elected in 1968 to the Municipal Corporation of Greater Bombay as a Municipal Councillor and served in that role till 1977. He was also the Chairman of the Brihanmumbai Electric Supply and Transport (BEST), which provides public road transport bus services as well as supplying electric supply to Mumbai.

=== Electric Supply to Slums scheme ===
He developed the Electric Supply to Slums Scheme, which provided electricity to slum areas across Bombay. The scheme was inaugurated on 15 August 1971 in Dharavi. It has since been adopted by local authorities for unauthorized slums in other parts of India.

== Environmental activism and social service ==
Save Bombay Committee

Kisan Mehta resigned from active politics, Municipal Councillorship and all elected posts as well as retired from personal private business in 1977 and devotes time, resources and energies to issues of environment protection, natural resource conservation, equity to all to natural resources of the earth, civil rights, gender equality to provide hope and self-confidence to the shunned and the shunted. Kisan Mehta endeavours to live a simple life demanding the minimum on the Earth's natural resources. He has been one of the key proponents of Urban Agriculture in India.

=== Save Bombay Committee and Prakruti ===
He set up Save Bombay Committee (SBC) in 1973 and Prakruti in 1988 as public trusts and registered societies. The SBC works in the area of urban and regional planning and development to ensure equal opportunity for improving the quality of life to all citizens by avoiding crowding, and removing inequalities as well as for open spaces, afforestation, environment protection etc.

In the initial decades of his service through SBC, he worked with noted social workers such as Shyam Chainani who was among the office bearers.

In his final decade of service through these NGOs, he worked mainly with noted social workers Harshad Kamdar, Priya Salvi, and Dilip Sankarreddy, who were among the office bearers of these two nonprofits.

=== Largest organic cotton cultivation ===
He campaigned for organic cultivation of cotton taken up in Vidarbha, Maharashtra's cotton growing region, with 135 farmers cultivating organically on 12 square kilometres of their land in 1995. It was recognised internationally as the largest organic cotton cultivation project in the world for that season. It became the torch bearer for organic cultivation movement in the country.

=== Strengthening environmental policies ===
Convinced on the need to protect the environment for the survival and sustenance of living beings, Kisan Mehta has assiduously worked for bringing about change in the country's legal structure as well as for assuring accountability and transparency in delivery of service to citizens. The Maharashtra Urban Areas Preservation and Protection of Trees Act, 1975 came about due to his initiative. Following his working, the Central Government constituted for the first time the Ministry of Environment and Forests in 1978 and enacted the Environment Protection Act in 1981.

=== Opposition to mega dams ===
He has supported agitation against megaprojects like Sardar Sarovar Dam on the River Narmada, Tehri Dam project in Uttar Pradesh, Silent Valley Project in Kerala and many others throughout the country. He visited Japan, various countries in North America, South America and Europe, etc., over five times to persuade the foreign governments not to support India's mega projects that affect the poor.

In order to galvanise the campaign at the international level, a number of European nongovernmental organisations, led by Action for World Solidarity in Berlin, coordinated a tour for Kisan Mehta and Shripad Dharmadikary through Germany, Sweden, Finland, Denmark, the Netherlands, and the United Kingdom, where they held meetings with parliament members and other government officials, various nongovernmental organizations and the press.

=== Opposition to Silent Valley Hydroelectric project ===
His Public Interest Litigation against the Kerala Government proposal to establish hydroelectric project in the Silent Valley National Park, a rain forest in Kerala, resulted in the government dropping the project altogether.

=== Talks ===
He has visited the United States, Europe, Russia, Asian and Latin American Countries, etc. for participating and presenting technical papers in UN and other conferences on urban issues, public health and waste management issues as well as on sustainable agriculture.
