= Yerawada Central Jail =

Prison located near Pune, India

Yerwada Central Jail
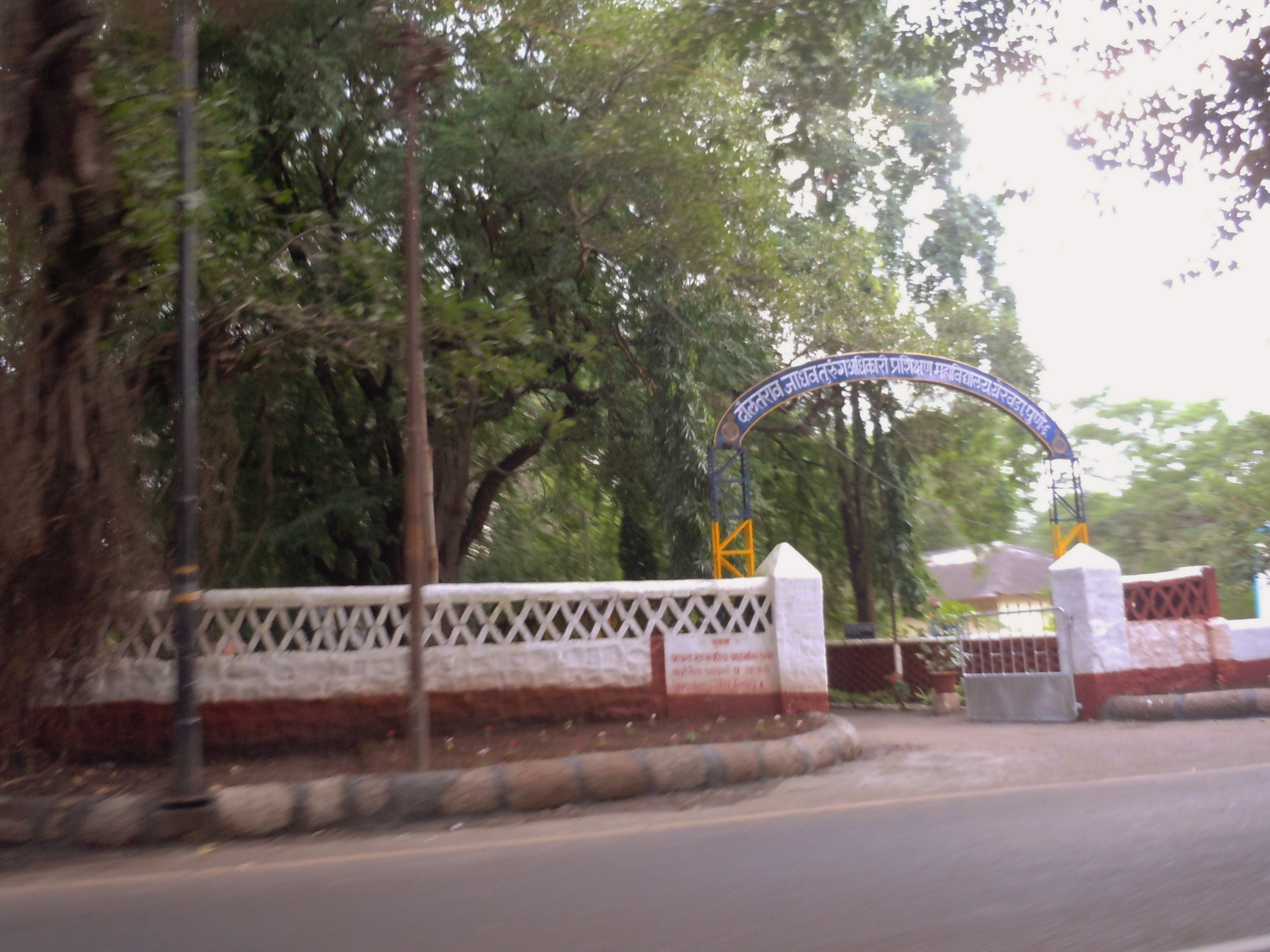
- Entrance to Yerwada jail campus

- Location in India
- Location: Yerwada, Pune, Maharashtra, India; 18.564575°N 73.889651°E
- Status: Operational
- Security class: Maximum
- Population: 3,600 (2005)
- Managed by: Government of Maharashtra, India

Yerwada Central Jail is a noted high-security prison in Yerwada, Pune in Maharashtra. This is the largest prison in the state of Maharashtra, and also one of the largest prisons in South Asia, housing over 5,000 prisoners (2017) spread over various barracks and security zones, besides an open jail just outside its premises. Many well known nationalist fighters individuals including Mahatma Gandhi and Jawaharlal Nehru have been jailed here.

== Overview ==
The jail is spread over 512 acres, holds over 5000 prisoners and is one of the largest prisons in South Asia. Within the campus, the main high security jail is protected by four high walls and is divided into various security zones and barracks it even has egg-shaped cells meant for high-security prisoners. It has been known for overcrowding and poor living conditions after news reports in 2003 lead to Maharashtra State Human Rights Commission (MHRC) issuing a notice.

== History ==
Yerwada Central Jail was built in 1871 by the British, when it was outside the city limits of Pune.

Under British rule, the jail housed many Indian nationalist fighters including Mahatma Gandhi, Jawaharlal Nehru, Netaji Subhas Bose, Joachim Alva and Bal Gangadhar Tilak and Bhuralal Ranchhoddas Sheth. In 1924, Vinayak Damodar Savarkar was also kept in the jail. Mahatma Gandhi spent several years in Yerwada Jail during India's freedom struggle, notably in 1932 and later in 1942 during the Quit India movement, along with many other nationalist fighters. During his 1932 imprisonment, which started after his arrest in January 1932, Gandhi went on an indefinite fast to protest against the Communal Award for depressed classes on 20 September 1932,. He discontinued his fast after signing an agreement called the Poona Pact, with the leader of depressed classes, Dr. Ambedkar in the jail on 24 September 1932. Gandhi was released from the jail in May 1933.

During the Quit India movement, along with Mahatma Gandhi and many national leaders, many freedom fighters from the Bombay Province such as Kisan Mehta were imprisoned in the Yerawada Central Jail.

During the Emergency era of 1975–77, many political opponents of Indira Gandhi were detained in this jail. Among those detained here were RSS chief Balasaheb Deoras, Atal Bihari Vajpayee, Pramila Dandavate, and Vasant Nargolkar.

In 1998, noted social worker Anna Hazare was briefly imprisoned here after he lost a defamation suit, and Bollywood film actor Sanjay Dutt in 2007 and among other noted criminals, scamster Telgi and former underworld don Arun Gawli started his political career while being lodged in this jail, and is currently serving a life sentence here, in a murder case. The 26/11 Mumbai terror attacker, Ajmal Kasab who was jailed in 2008, was hanged and buried here on 21 November 2012. From 2002 to 2008, a noted smuggler from Singapore, Major Paul, was transferred here from Kolhapur Jail. He went on to study law in prison and became a noted prison activist. His petitions to the Bombay High Court resulted in the release of scores of prisoners wrongly imprisoned there. After his release, he continued his prison social works from Pune. Amongst his noted achievements were the changes made to the Prison Furlough rules via his own Furlough Application to the Bombay High Court. His life story was made into a TV serial episode shown on Sony TV under the "Prayaschit" series. He is currently an Ordained Pastor of the Protestant Church.

== Yerwada Open Jail ==
Yerwada Open Jail (YOJ) is situated just outside the Yerwada Central jail within the campus and houses life sentence prisoners, who have amicably completed five years in the central jail. Here they live under basic security, and are not put in prison cells. Over 150 inmates of the open jail grow organic vegetables, over five guntha of land, which are sent to the Yerwada Central Prison and the women's prison. Besides this, the cow shed has 30 cows, through which manure is collected and used in farming activities.

== Notable Inmates ==
- Vinayak Damodar Savarkar
- Mahatma Gandhi
- Jawaharlal Nehru
- Subhas Chandra Bose
- Joachim Alva
- Bal Gangadhar Tilak
- Madhukar Dattatraya Deoras
- Atal Bihari Vajpayee
- Pramila Dandavate
- Anna Hazare
- Seema Gavit and Renuka Shinde
- Sanjay Dutt
- Abdul Karim Telgi
- Sukhdev Singh Sukha and Harjinder Singh Jinda
- Ajmal Kasab
- Kisan Mehta
- Manya Surve
- Yakub Memon

== Programs ==
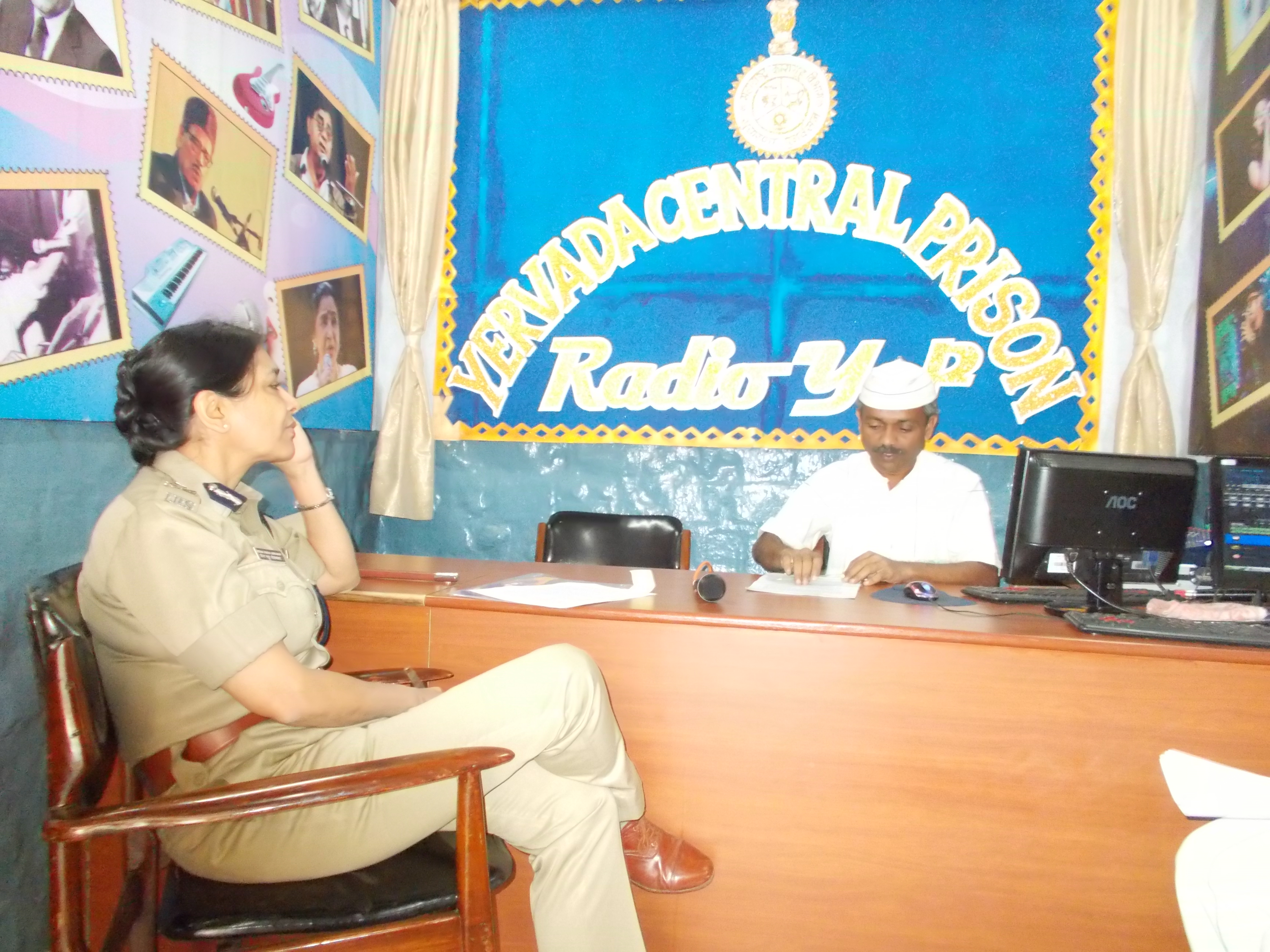
Staff at the prison's radio station

A program designed to spread Gandhian principles in Yerwada prison was introduced in Yerwada prison in 2002 by Asim Sarode, founder of Sahyog Trust. As part of the programme, the prison inmates are taught Gandhian principles for one year, at the end of the year, they have to appear for an examination. Admission to the course is optional. Inmates of the jail produce nearly 5,000 clothes daily, supplied to jails across the state, it has its own textile mill and later around 150 inmates, including women, are involved in stitching these clothes. Some of these costumes, like uniforms of superintendents, prisoners, wardens, and guards, were made for Madhur Bhandarkar's 2009 film Jail.

In 2007, in an effort to promote Indian medicinal plants, 8,500 saplings of sandalwood were planted within the central jail premises, while 9,000 saplings of Ashoka (Saraca indica) in its open jail. An Integrated Counselling and Testing Centre (ICTC) related facility was started at the jail on 2 October 2008, by the Maharashtra State AIDS Control Society (MSACS), and within the following year 55 inmates including six women tested HIV positive.

== See also ==
- Harsul Central Jail
- Mumbai Central Jail
