= Action Reconciliation Service for Peace =

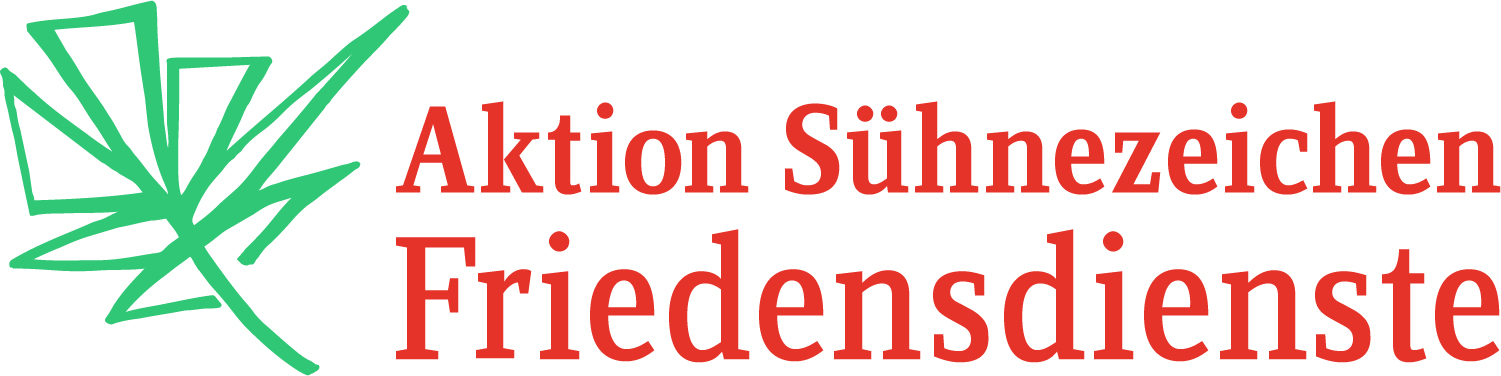
Logo

The Action Reconciliation Service for Peace is a German peace organization founded to confront the legacy of Nazism.

The Action Reconciliation Service for Peace (German: Aktion Sühnezeichen Friedensdienste, or ASF) was founded in 1958 by the synod of the Evangelical Church in Germany, driven by the efforts of Lothar Kreyssig. It was prompted by the acknowledgement of guilt that Germans needed to face at the end of World War II and the Nazi era.

The Action Reconciliation Service for Peace (ARSP) is known especially through its international volunteer programs and the organisation of work camps in western and eastern Europe. Every year, ARSP sends approximately 180 volunteers to countries that suffered under the German occupation during World War II: Belgium, France, the United Kingdom, Greece, Netherlands, Russia, Poland, Czech Republic, Belarus, and Ukraine. They also work in Israel and the United States because many Holocaust survivors fled or immigrated to these countries.

== Objective ==
Knowing that the consequences of National Socialism are still being felt and that they can never truly be overcome, the Action Reconciliation Service for Peace (ARSP) stands for understanding between generations, cultures, religions and peoples which it strives to achieve through intensive dialogue. Rooted in Christian faith, ARSP seeks to cooperate with all who champion a more peaceful and just world.

— ASRP, About us, ARSP official website

== Excerpt from the by-laws of ARSP ==
§2 Purpose and operation

1. The organization is one whose goal, in taking up and furthering the Founding Manifesto of 1958, is reconciliation with those nations and peoples occupied by Nazi Germany or threatened with annihilation; and to develop the aptitude for peace.
2. It shall realize its tasks in particular through:

a) short- and long-term voluntary service;
b) seminars and other educational resources;
c) promotion of scientific research whose purpose has themes of peace and reconciliation;
d) help for victims of tyranny;
e) promoting cooperation among all who are pursuing the same goals;
f) informing the public about the objectives pursued by the organization.

== History of the Action Reconciliation Service for Peace ==
=== Background ===
ARSP developed out of the actions of the Evangelical Church in Germany to reject Nazism and resist the Nazi regime. The founder of ARSP, Judge Lothar Kreyssig, was one of the determined resisters within the Confessing Church. After the war, he made this refusal by a branch of the Protestant church a subject of discussion and, along with like-minded people, such as Martin Niemöller, Gustav Heinemann and later, Franz von Hammerstein, called for repentance and reversal of harm.

=== Appeal for the Action for Reconciliation ===
Lothar Kreyssig tried to find fellow campaigners for his reconciliation service for the first time on Kirchentag 1954, in Leipzig. The appeal found few ears. "That something is right and necessary, is not enough to see it materialize in time and space. The hour must be ripe," he later wrote in his unpublished autobiography. The Synod of the Evangelical Church in Germany convened from 26 to 30 April 1958, alternating in Spandau, in West Berlin) and Weißensee in East Berlin. At this point, the synod still involved the entire Evangelical Church in Germany, both east and west. There was a controversy that year over the west German military chaplaincy contract and possible nuclear armament by the Bundeswehr. This was the troubled atmosphere in which Praeses Kreyssig, on the last day of the Synod, read his appeal to found the Action for Reconciliation. Numerous attendees signed the appeal that evening.

The appeal not only expressed an admission of guilt, it also delineated concrete consequences. The Action for Reconciliation would not offer assistance, rather, would ask to help. This humble attitude was a rejection of any patronizing functionalization of the reconciliation thought process. The attitude was to signal the readiness to get involved — that is, to learn by doing and through dialogue — because the appeal relied on conversation, response and new action.

The Action for Reconciliation was initially founded as a Germany-wide organization, but the division of Germany made a joint effort impossible. The two German states therefore had two organizations with a common goal, albeit different emphasis in practice.

Kreyssig wollte seine Gründung "Aktion Versöhnungszeichen" nennen. Auf Anraten des Leiters der Evangelischen Akademie Berlin Erich Müller-Gangloff hieß sie dann aber "Aktion Sühnezeichen", weil "Versöhnung erst die Frucht der Bereitschaft zur Sühne und zur Vergebung sei" (K.Weiß: Lothar Kreyssig Prophet der Versöhnung, 1998, S.336) Unter diesem Namen wurde in Berlin, Jebenstr. 1 neben dem Konsistorium der EKU, deren Präses Kreyssig war, das Büro der Aktion eingerichtet. (G.Kammerer: Aktion Sühnezeichen Friedensdienste, 2008, S.38). Lothar Kreyssig war ihr Leiter bis zum Mauerbau 1961. Danach war die Verwaltung der EKU-Ost und das Büro von Sühnezeichen-Ost im Grüberhaus in der Bischofstraße 6-8, neben der Marienkirche(K.Weiß, a.a.O. S.374). In Westberlin und in der Bundesrepublik Deutschland wurde Sühnezeichen seit 1961 von Erich Müller-Gangloff und Franz v. Hammerstein geleitet.(G.Kammerer, a.a.O. S.101).Die Arbeit der Sommerlager in der DDR geschah unter dem Dach des Diakonischen Werks.(G.Kammerer, a.a.O. S.102)

Mit der Vereinsgründung für die Bundesrepublik 1968 wurde auch der Name geändert in "Aktion Sühnezeichen-Friedensdienste".. In der DDR blieb der Name "Aktion Sühnezeichen" bis zur Vereinigung der beiden Hälften zu einem Verein erhalten. Ab 1.Mai 1991 galt dann nur noch der Name "Aktion Sühnezeichen-Friedensdienste"(G.Kammerer, a.a.O. S.109; S.222-226) .

=== ARSP in western Germany ===
Die Aktion Sühnezeichen began its work in 1959 with construction projects in the Netherlands and Norway and later, with projects in other countries. Volunteers helped build a synagoge in Villeurbanne and the Church of Reconciliation in Taizé, Saône-et-Loire, in Burgundy, France. They helped build a kindergarten in Skopje in the former Yugoslavia, helped install a water irrigation system on Crete, and helped create an international symbol of reconciliation from the ruins of Coventry Cathedral in England. Work in Israel began in 1961, after the Adolf Eichmann trial was concluded. From the mid-1960s, the projects slowly changed. There was ever less construction work, but new projects emerged for memorials, for work with the elderly, and social work. By the 1980s, with World War II fading into the past, there were additional projects working with minority groups.

=== ASZ in eastern Germany ===
Die DDR-Regierung verhinderte von Anfang an die Aussendung ostdeutscher Freiwlliger. The German Democratic Republic (GDR) considered itself to be an anti-fascist state, it did not consider itself responsible for the consequences of German fascism. Therefore, the projects of the ASZ were initially limited to the GDR. In 1965 and 1966, volunteers were still able to travel with Catholic chaplains from Magdeburg to Auschwitz, Majdanek, Stutthof, Groß-Rosen and Breslau. By 1967 and 1968, further trips to memorial sites in Poland and Czechoslovakia were not permitted, despite invitations being sent to the state visa refusal. With the introduction in 1972 of visa-free travel between the GDR and Poland and Czechoslovakia, young German were able to take part in summer camps in Poland. By then, Polish and Czech young people were also embarking on missions in the GDR. From this time on, reconciliation groups were involved in the preservation and restoration of Jewish cemeteries in almost every region of the GDR. The first group to work at Buchenwald was in 1979. Starting in 1981, the number of summer camps expanded to include Sachsenhausen, Ravensbrück, and Nordhausen-Dora. From 1962 till 1992, over 12,000 volunteers took part in the summer camps from ASZ.

=== Reunification ===
After reunification, the two eastern and western organizations merged, retaining their different forms of voluntary service, the long-term service of the ARSP and the short-term service and summer camps of the ASZ. Like the European Voluntary Service, since the late 1990s, the ARSP has increased the number of project sites to respond to changing need and new opportunities.

== Current ARSP projects ==
=== Long-term voluntary service ===
At present, ARSP sends out about 180 young people per year to work on projects, primarily in countries that suffered directly from the Nazis, but also ones that have large numbers of Holocaust survivors. Belgium, Greece, France, the United Kingdom, the Netherlands, Norway, Poland, Russia, the Czech Republic, Israel, Ukraine, America and Belarus all have ARSP voluntary projects.

The volunteers are predominantly young, between the ages of 18 and 27. Conscientious objectors can fulfill their required civil service under the auspices of ARSP. Volunteers support and accompany survivors of the Holocaust and their descendants, work at memorial sites, take care of older people, those with disabilities, the disadvantaged and refugees, and get involved in neighborhood projects and anti-racism initiatives.

ARSP volunteers helped create an international center of reconciliation in the ruins of Coventry Cathedral. In Israel, volunteers have worked in historical or political education and at the national memorial site, Yad Vashem in Jerusalem and in projects with Jewish and Arab citizens, working toward mutual understanding.

ARSP first sent volunteers to Norway and the Netherlands in 1959 to work on construction projects. More recently, volunteers in the Netherlands work in historical or political education, for example, at the Joods Historisch Museum or Anne Frank Foundation.

Volunteers in Poland work in societies for former concentration camp prisoners and at concentration camps sites, Auschwitz in Oświęcim, Stutthof in Gdańsk and Majdanek near Lublin. For political reasons, ARSP first sent volunteers to Russia in 1990, and the Czech Republic in 1993. In Russia, they work at veterans' hospitals and the Russian human rights organization, Memorial. In the Czech Republic, they work with the Jewish community in Prague and at the memorial site Theresienstadt concentration camp. Volunteers to Ukraine work with former forced laborers.

ARSP has 24 volunteer positions in the United States. They work with Holocaust survivors or in offices at the United States Holocaust Memorial Museum Washington, DC and the American Jewish Committee in New York and Washington. Since 1996, about 15-20 requests per year have come from partner programs in other countries from young people seeking voluntary peace service in Germany, as well.

=== Peace Service in Germany ===
After partner organizations abroad suggested a voluntary service programme in Germany in the 1980s, since 1996 15 to 20 volunteers from the US, Israel and different European countries are annually hosted in Germany for a longterm voluntary service.

=== Short- and medium-term voluntary service ===
Each year, about 300 people take part in summer camps, where they live and work together in about 25 camps in Germany and other countries. All summer camps are run by unsalaried employees, often former long-term volunteers who want to pass along their own experience. During the two- to three-week stay, volunteers learn about current and historical issues and are involved in projects, such as performing upkeep at Jewish cemeteries and memorial sites. They also work in social services and with intercultural projects.

== Public relations and education ==
Many ARSP alumni are in regional groups and maintain connections, continuing to volunteer even after their initial voluntary period ends. With the implementation of long- and short-term voluntary service, more unsalaried positions are created, filled by these alumni. Some also contribute to public relations and education efforts.

Four times a year, ARSP publishes Zeichen (Signs), a magazine (in German) that reports on the current work of volunteers and project partners. Each issue is centered around a different theme. It publishes Predigthilfen & Materiellen für die Gemeinde (Sermon aids and materials for the congregation) three times a year, on the occasion of "Israel Sunday," (a memorial day in the Evangelical church); for a ten-day period in November, called the Ökumenische Friedensdekade ("Ecumenical Decade of Peace"); and for International Holocaust Remembrance Day. With these, ARSP wants to convey theological insights from the Jewish-Christian dialogue and the dialogue with Islam into the religious community. In addition, ARSP wants to weigh in on current political themes, thereby joining the inter-religious and inter-cultural dialogue and presenting its position against anti-semitism, right-wing extremism and racism and strongly advocating for compensation to those persecuted by the Nazis; and for a just peace.

=== Educational work ===
ARSP endeavors to stimulate societal debateon the themes of the politics of memory, national identities and inter-religious dialogue with events, workshops, seminars and congresses. ARSP contributes as founder, sponsor or cooperative partner to the following:

- International Youth Meeting Center in Oświęcim/Auschwitz.
- Beit Ben Yehuda International Meeting Center and Guest House in Jerusalem.
- Foyer le Pont in Paris. Meeting center in Paris.

== Awards ==
- Buber-Rosenzweig Medal, 1993
- Marion Samuel Prize, 2001
- Hans Ehrenberg Prize, 2006

== Memberships ==
- in Germany: Aktionsgemeinschaft Dienst für den Frieden ("Communal Action Service for Freedom")
- in the USA: Council of Religious Volunteer Agencies, (CRVA)

== Notable former ARSP volunteers ==
- Christoph Heubner, German author and executive vice-president of the International Auschwitz Committee
- Thomas Lutz, manager of Topography of Terror Foundation, Berlin; former Fellow, United States Holocaust Memorial Museum
- Andreas Maislinger, Austrian historian and political scientist, founder of the Austrian Holocaust Memorial Service
- Thomas Oppermann, German politician, member of the Bundestag, (SPD)
- Joachim Schlör, Professor of Modern Jewish/non-Jewish Relations and head of the Parkes Institute, University of Southampton
- Robert Thalheim, German director and screenwriter, And Along Come Tourists

== See also ==
- Austrian Holocaust Memorial Service
