= Jail industry =

The "jail industry" in India refers to the system of prisons and correctional institutions run by the Indian government. This system is responsible for the detention, rehabilitation, and reintegration of individuals who have been convicted of crimes. It is a system of vocational training for inmates in order to develop their skills and rehabilitate them after their release, with the goal of rehabilitating convicted inmates. Prisoners in India are increasingly being utilized as a source of labor by private sector companies, producing products such as textiles and food.

== History ==
During the colonial era in India, correctional facilities were referred to as "houses of industries" rather than centers of rehabilitation. The disciplinary system within these institutions prioritized the attainment of financial gain through the implementation of various forms of forced labor and severe punishment methods. The 1850s saw the inception of remunerative jail industries, granting prisoners the opportunity to receive wages for their labor during incarceration. This progress was credited to Frederic J. Mouat.

== Reforms and rehabilitation ==
The latest theory of punishment posits that rehabilitation is the primary goal, with the aim of providing offenders with treatment and education to enable them to reintegrate into society and abide by the law.

Jawaharlal Nehru emphasized that any reforms made to the prison system must be based on the principle that the goal of incarceration is not to inflict punishment, but rather to rehabilitate and reintegrate individuals into society as productive citizens. The implementation of this viewpoint would require a comprehensive revision of the prison system.

The jail industry in India is governed by the Prisons Act, 1894, and the Prison Manual, which outline the rules and regulations for the operation of prisons. Inmates serving their sentences are expected to perform labour in the facility's workshops or industries. Training is provided to convicted individuals in a variety of trades, including textile manufacturing, which involves the weaving of fabric, niwar, durries, and carpets among other things. In addition to that, they are engaged in iron work and carpentry.

== Mentions of jail industry and its products ==
Jail industries were prevalent in India prior to independence. In his book "Handbook of the Manufactures and Arts of the Punjab," Baden Henry Powell refers to many textile products produced in rural cottage and jail industries in the Punjab region.

Different State Gazetteers of India cite the production of various goods in the jail industry within their respective states.

== Tihar jail factory products ==
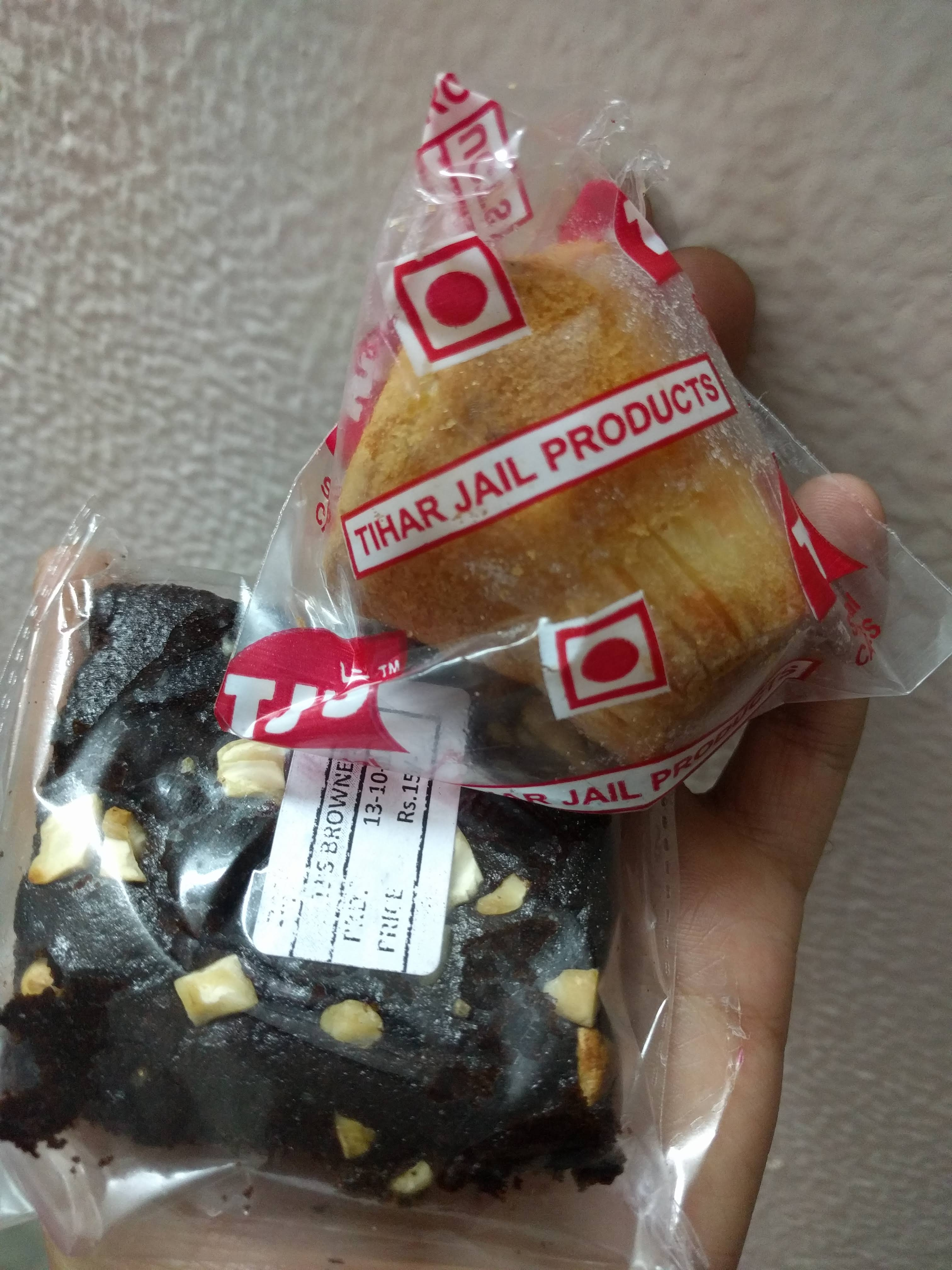
Tihar jail products

The Central Jail Factory, a subunit of the Delhi Prisons Department, is a prominent establishment that employs around 400 inmates in various units. The factory focuses on the all-around welfare, including reformation, rehabilitation and reintegration of inmates, who are trained in skilled trades such as carpentry, chemical, paper, weaving and tailoring. The factory also provides training in various skilled trades based on the interests of the inmates and using state-of-the-art machinery.

=== TJ brand ===
Tihar Jail, one of the largest and most overcrowded prisons in India, has started using its brand TJ to sell goods at showrooms. The products sold under the TJ brand include snacks, food products, furniture, handicrafts, garments, and other items made by the inmates.

== Prison band ==
Prison band groups have been established at various correctional facilities, including Central Prison Jaipur, Jodhpur, Udaipur, Ajmer, Bikaner, and Kota in Rajasthan, providing inmates with instruction in band instrumentation and the opportunity to perform at private events.

== Yerawada jail textiles ==
Yerawada Central Jail has a textile factory that produces various clothing products, such as Khadi and cotton clothes, and also supplies these clothes to film production houses. The jail's inmates produce nearly 5,000 clothes per day, which are distributed to jails throughout the state. In Madhur Bhandarkar's film Jail, the clothing worn by a few characters bears the label "Made in Yerawada." The inmates stitched those clothes that, include the clothes and uniforms of cooks, guards, convicts, undertrials, superintendents, wardens, night security guards, and warders.

== Source of labor ==
Prisoners are increasingly being utilized as a source of labor by private sector companies. During a recruitment drive held at the Tihar Jail premises, a total of 66 inmates who are nearing the completion of their sentences were offered employment by private companies. The Vedanta and IDEIM India Pvt Ltd provided the most job offers, and the Taj Mahal Group extended the highest salary package to an inmate named Raju Parasnath, who has been incarcerated for over eight years.

== Insufficient labor opportunities across Indian prisons ==
It has been observed that in various prisons, convicts who have been sentenced to rigorous imprisonment may in fact be serving simple imprisonment. This is due to the lack of available work opportunities within the prison system. According to a 2011 report by the Hindustan Times, the majority of convicts sentenced to "rigorous imprisonment" in India do not engage in work as most prisons in the country lack sufficient demand for prison labor. Specifically, the report indicates that 99% of convicts receiving these sentences do not undertake work.

== See also ==
- Prison labor
- Forced labour
- California Department of Corrections and Rehabilitation
- California Prison Industry Authority
- Penal slavery
