= Lothar Kreyssig =

German judge

- Born: 30 October 1898; Flöha, German Empire
- Died: 6 July 1986 (aged 87); Bergisch Gladbach, West Germany
- Occupation: Judge
- Known for: Opposing the Nazis, postwar reconciliation efforts

Lothar Kreyssig (German: [ˈloː.taʁ ˈkʁaɪ̯.sɪç]; 30 October 1898 – 6 July 1986) was a German judge during the Weimar and Nazi era. He was the only German judge who attempted to stop the mass-murder of persons deemed "unworthy of living" under the Aktion T4 "involuntary euthanasia" program, an intervention that cost him his job. After the Second World War, he was again offered a judgeship but declined. Later, he became an advocate of German reconciliation and founded the Action Reconciliation Service for Peace and the German development aid non-government organization, Action for World Solidarity.

== Biography ==
=== Early years ===
Lothar Ernst Paul Kreyssig was born in Flöha, Saxony, the son of a businessman and grain merchant. After elementary school, he attended a gymnasium in Chemnitz. He set aside his education and enlisted in the army in 1916 during the First World War. Two years of service in the war took him to France, the Baltics and Serbia. After the war, between 1919 and 1922, he studied law in Leipzig, receiving his doctorate in 1923. In 1926, he went to work at the district court in Chemnitz and two years later became a judge there.

In 1933, Kreyssig was pressured to join the Nazi party, but refused, citing his need for judicial independence. However, in 1934, he joined the Confessing Church and in 1935, was elected Praeses at the synod of the Confessing Church in Saxony.

He was still able to work in his profession and in 1937, he was transferred to Brandenburg an der Havel to the lower district court. His work as a mental health court guardianship judge made him responsible for several hundred mentally challenged children and adults. He bought an estate in nearby Havelsee, where he practiced biodynamic farming. A preliminary investigation prompted by Kreyssig's church activities was made against him, but no action was taken.

After the number of death certificates of his wards began to accumulate on his desk, he began to suspect the deaths were connected to the "mercy killing" that had begun. He reported his suspicions in a letter to Minister of Justice Franz Gürtner, dated July 8, 1940. He pilloried the Nazis' Aktion T4 euthanasia program. He also addressed the disenfranchisement of prisoners in Nazi concentration camps, making all his arguments on firm legal grounds.

What is right is what benefits the people. In the name of this frightful doctrine — as yet, uncontradicted by any guardian of rights in Germany — entire sectors of communal living are excluded from [having] rights, for example, all the concentration camps, and now, all hospitals and sanatoriums.

Kreyssig then filed a charge against Reichsleiter Philipp Bouhler for murder. He filed an injunction against the institutions in which he had housed his wards, prohibiting them from transferring the wards without his consent.

On 13 November 1940 Kreyssig was summoned by Gürtner, who laid before Kreyssig Hitler's personal letter that had started the euthanasia program and which constituted the sole legal basis for it. Kreyssig replied, "The Führer's word does not create a right," clearly signifying that he did not recognize this as a legal right. Gürtner then told Kreyssig, "If you cannot recognise the will of the Führer as a source of law, then you cannot remain a judge." In December 1940, Kreyssig was suspended. Efforts by the Gestapo to send him to a concentration camp failed. Two years later, in March 1942, Hitler forced Kreyssig to retire.

Kreyssig then devoted himself to organic farming and church work. He also hid two Jewish women on his property until the end of the war.

=== After 1945 ===
After the end of National Socialism, Kreyssig came to be appreciated as a Widerstandskämpfer. However, in the Soviet occupation zone after the war, as an alleged Prussian Junker he lost part of his estate.

Feeling that the rule of law in the Soviet occupation zone was insufficient, Kreyssig decided against resuming his career as a judge. Instead, he accepted an offer from Bishop Otto Dibelius and in 1945, became the consistorial president of the Evangelical Church of the Church Province of Saxony in Magdeburg. In 1947, he became Praeses of the Synod of the church province, an office he held until 1964. In December 1950 the general synod of the Evangelical Church of the old-Prussian Union elected him its praeses, an office he held until 1970. In 1952, he briefly headed the church chancellery of that Church.

Between 1949 and 1961, he was a council member of the Evangelical Church in Germany, the Protestant umbrella in Germany, and from 1949 to 1958, he was also eastern vice president of the Deutscher Evangelischer Kirchentag. Spiritually, he was at home in the Evangelische Michaelsbruderschaft. Kreyssig's views were controversial. He espoused an ecumenism of Christians, but one that would also include Judaism. Kreyssig turned against the Wiederbewaffnung and rejected the division of Germany into two countries.

Kreyssig established church institutions and programs, such as the Protestant Academy of the Church Province of Saxony, and a hotline. He founded the Aktionsgemeinschaft für die Hungernden, a communal action to combat hunger, which was a precursor of the NGO Action for World Solidarity.

His most significant work, however, was the founding of the Action Reconciliation Service for Peace. Kreyssig called for the founding of this action in 1958, saying that young Germans should go to former enemy countries and to Israel to ask for forgiveness and show, by volunteering to do good deeds to atone for the bombing and crimes of World War II and the Nazi regime (especially the Holocaust), to show signs of atonement, to work toward reconciliation, and for peace.

Today, thousands of Germans have volunteered in numerous countries through this organization. The first projects were in Norway, the Netherlands, Great Britain, France and Greece. With the construction of the Berlin Wall, Kreyssig was cut off from the international activities of his organization. As a result, he gave up running the organization and devoted himself to building a version of the organization in the German Democratic Republic. One of the first projects of this initiative was to rebuild two destroyed churches in Magdeburg.

In 1971, Kreyssig and his wife moved to West Berlin. He lived in a nursing home from 1977 in Bergisch Gladbach until his death in 1986.

== Legacy and memorials ==
To this day, Kreyssig is known as the only judge who tried to stop the systematic murders conducted under the Nazis' T4 program.

The cities of Flöha, Brandenburg an der Havel, Magdeburg, Karlsruhe and Bergisch Gladbach each have a street named after him. In Flöha, there is a Förderschule and in Lehnin, a senior care center that bear his name. The Lothar Kreyssig Peace Prize has been awarded every two years since 1999 by the Lothar Kreyssig Foundation in Magdeburg.

On the anniversary of his 100th birthday, a memorial plaque was unveiled at the Oberlandesgericht (Superior Regional Court) in Brandenburg an der Havel. The former lower district court site, now the location of the Brandenburg Generalstaatsanwaltschaft (Attorney General), outside, has two memorial stelae and inside, a plaque with an inscription by Kreyssig's biographer, Konrad Weiß. The Brandenburg Association of Jurists donated the plaque on 5 May 2008 to commemorate Kreyssig's Appeal to found the Action for Reconciliation on the 50th anniversary of its introduction.

On 22 October 2006 the Federal Ministry of Justice held a memorial, sponsored by Minister of Justice Brigitte Zypries, on the occasion of the 20th anniversary of Kreyssig's death.

On 5 July 2008 a memorial was unveiled at Hohenferchesar, his residence from 1937 to 1972.

Lothar and Johanna Kreyssig were recognised as Righteous Among the Nations by Yad Vashem in 2016.

== Publications ==
- Gerechtigkeit für David. Gottes Gericht und Gnade über dem Ahnen Jesu Christi. Nach dem 2. Buch Samuelis, 1949
- Appeal to found the Action for Reconciliation Action for Reconciliation Service for Peace, official website. Berlin 1958. Retrieved March 13, 2010

== See also ==
- Brandenburg an der Havel for its relationship to the Nazis' Action T4 euthanasia program

== Sources ==
- Konrad Weiß, Lothar Kreyssig. Prophet der Versöhnung Bleicher Verlag, Gerlingen (1998) ISBN 3-88350-659-1 (in German)
- Susanne Willems, Lothar Kreyssig - Vom eigenen verantwortlichen Handeln, Aktion Sühnezeichen/Friedensdienste, Berlin, (1995) ISBN 3-89246-032-9 (in German)
- Susanne Willems, in: Verfolgung, Alltag, Widerstand - Brandenburg in der NS-Zeit, Verlag Volk & Welt Berlin (1993) pp. 383–410, ISBN 3-353-00991-4 (in German)
- "Unrecht beim Namen genannt." Memorial for Lothar Kreyssig on 30 October 1998, published by the Brandenburg Oberlandesgericht, Nomos Verlagsgesellschaft, Baden-Baden, (1998) ISBN 3-7890-5878-5 (in German)
- Martin Kramer, Magdeburger Biographisches Lexikon, Scriptum Verlag Magdeburg (2002) ISBN 3-933046-49-1 (in German)
- Karl-Klaus Rabe, Umkehr in die Zukunft - Die Arbeit der Aktion Sühnezeichen/Friedensdienste, Lamuv Verlag, Göttingen (1983) ISBN 3-921521-90-4 (in German)
- Helmut Kramer, Lothar Kreyssig (1898 bis 1986), Richter und Christ im Widerstand in: Redaktion Kritische Justiz (Hg.): Streitbare Juristen. Nomos, Baden-Baden (1989) pp. 342–354, ISBN 3-7890-1580-6 (in German)
- Wolf Kahl, Lothar Kreyssig - Amtsrichter im Widerstand und Prophet der Versöhnung, Deutsche Richterzeitung 2008, pp. 299–302 (in German)
- Anke Silomon, Widerstand von Protestanten im NS und in der DDR, Aus Politik und Zeitgeschichte, 14/2009 (30 March 2009) pp. 33 – 38 (in German)
