= Topography of Terror =

Nazi history museum in Berlin

Coordinates: 52°30′25″N 13°22′58″E

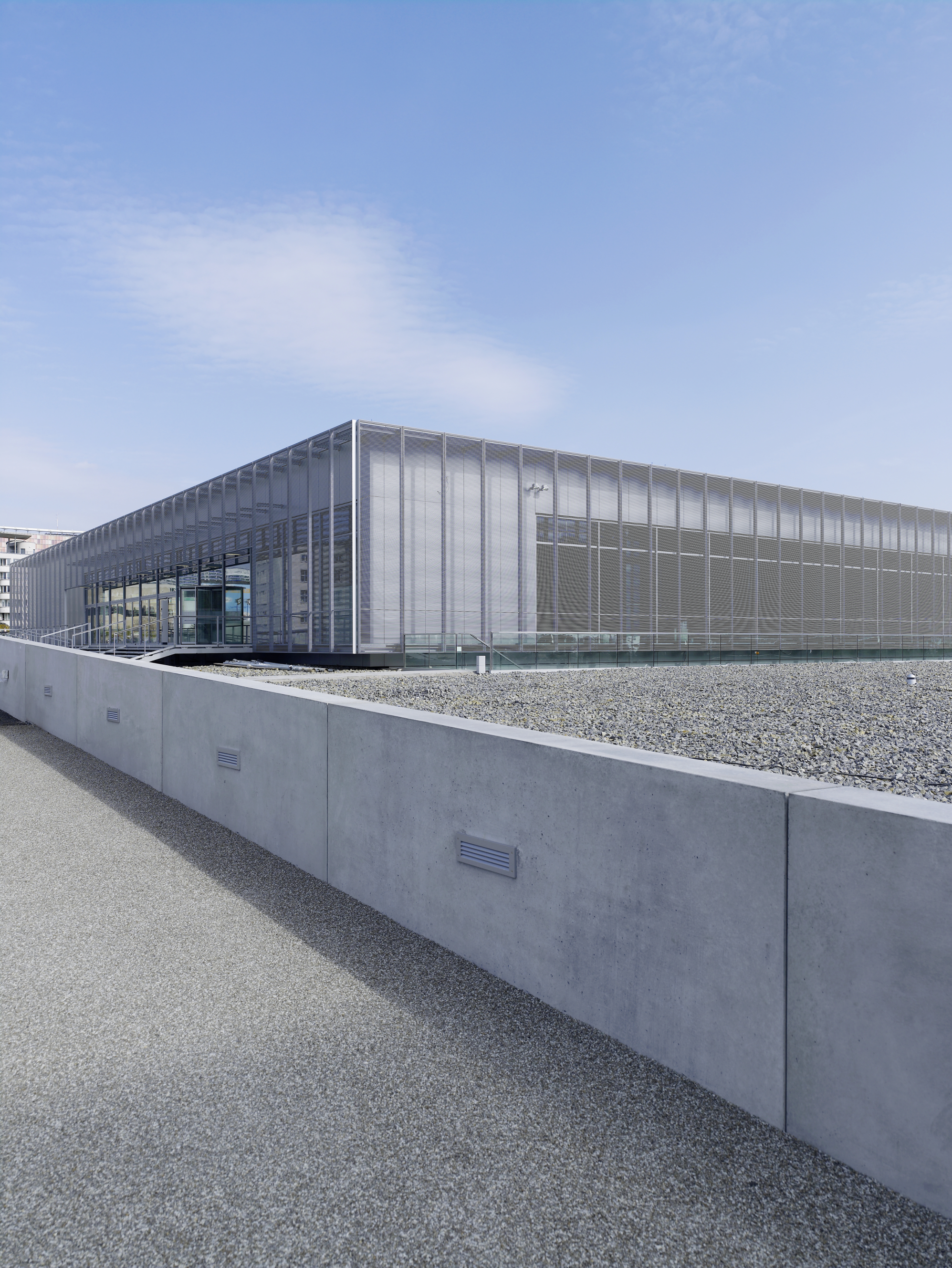
The new building of the Topography of Terror Foundation, 2010

Topography of Terror, Berlin

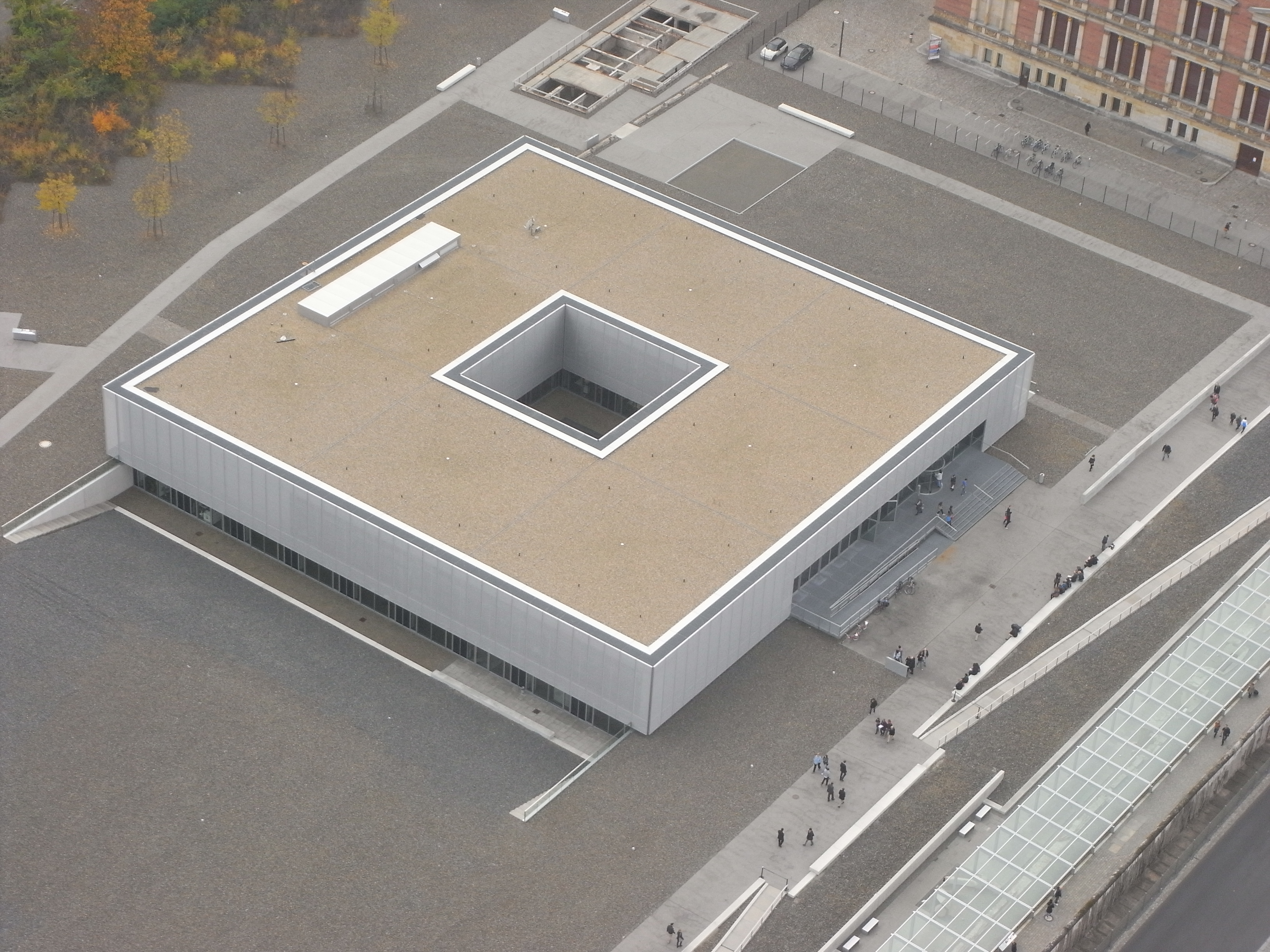
Aerial view of the building

The Topography of Terror (German: Topographie des Terrors) is an outdoor and indoor history museum in Berlin, Germany. It is located on Niederkirchnerstrasse, formerly Prinz-Albrecht-Strasse, on the site of buildings which during the Nazi regime from 1933 to 1945 were the SS Reich Security Main Office, the headquarters of the SiPo, SD, Einsatzgruppen, and Gestapo.

The buildings that housed the Gestapo and SS headquarters were largely destroyed by Allied bombing during early 1945 and the ruins demolished after the war. The boundary between the American and Soviet zones of occupation in Berlin ran along the Prinz-Albrecht-Strasse, so the street soon became a fortified boundary, and the Berlin Wall ran along the south side of the street, renamed Niederkirchnerstrasse, from 1961 to 1989. The wall here was never demolished. The section adjacent to the Topography of Terror site is the longest extant segment of the outer wall, as the longer East Side Gallery section in Friedrichshain was part of the inner wall, not visible from West Berlin.

The first exhibitions of the site took place in 1987, as part of Berlin's 750th anniversary. The cellar of the Gestapo headquarters, where many political prisoners were tortured and executed, was found and excavated. The site was then turned into a memorial and museum, in the open air but protected from the elements by a canopy, detailing the history of repression under the Nazis. The excavation took place in cooperation with East German researchers, and a joint exhibition was shown both at the site and in East Germany in 1989.

In 1992, two years after German reunification, a foundation was established to take care of the site, and the following year, it initiated an architectural competition to design a permanent museum. A design by architect Peter Zumthor was chosen. However, construction was stopped due to funding problems after the concrete core of the structure had been built. This stood on the site for nearly a decade until it was finally demolished in 2004 and a new building begun.

The construction of the new Documentation Centre according to a prize-winning design by the architect Ursula Wilms (Heinle, Wischer und Partner, Berlin) and the landscape architect Heinz W. Hallmann (Aachen) was finished in 2010. The new Documentation Centre was officially opened on 6 May 2010 by Federal President Horst Köhler on the occasion of the 65th anniversary of the end of World War II. The new exhibition and documentation building and the redesigned historic grounds were opened to the public on 7 May 2010.

== History ==
After the demolition of the ruins in the 1950s, the area was used as a bumper car site and a dumping ground for rubble from the renovation of Kreuzberg. The plans for a memorial site on the former site of the Gestapo go back to 1978, when Berlin architecture critic Dieter Hoffmann-Axthelm was one of the first to note, in essays and surveys, the significance of the former site of the Gestapo, SD and RSHA headquarters.

The first exhibition on the site's history was created for the 750th anniversary of Berlin in 1987. The research continued after it, leading to a documentation centre that collected some more evidence for the terror of the National Socialists in Germany. In 1992, a foundation was created for the construction and maintenance of the centre with an associated permanent exhibition. The managing director is Rabbi Andreas Nachama.

A tender in 1993 to design the museum complex was won by the Pritzker Prize-winning Swiss architect Peter Zumthor. Based on the temporary exhibition building, his design was likened to the skeleton of a barracks, allowing light through the glazed gaps in the concrete beams. Although critically acclaimed, the structure proved expensive to build and when the original contractor became insolvent in the middle of construction, no other contractor willing to continue the project for the fixed fee could be found. With the city of Berlin unwilling to pay an additional three to five million Euros for a reduced design and funding from the federal government delayed until more progress was achieved, the site was left with just the concrete stairwells of the design. Having spent 13.9 million Euros already, these were demolished, despite the protests of Zumthor and other architects, in 2004.

=== Architectural design competition 2005 ===
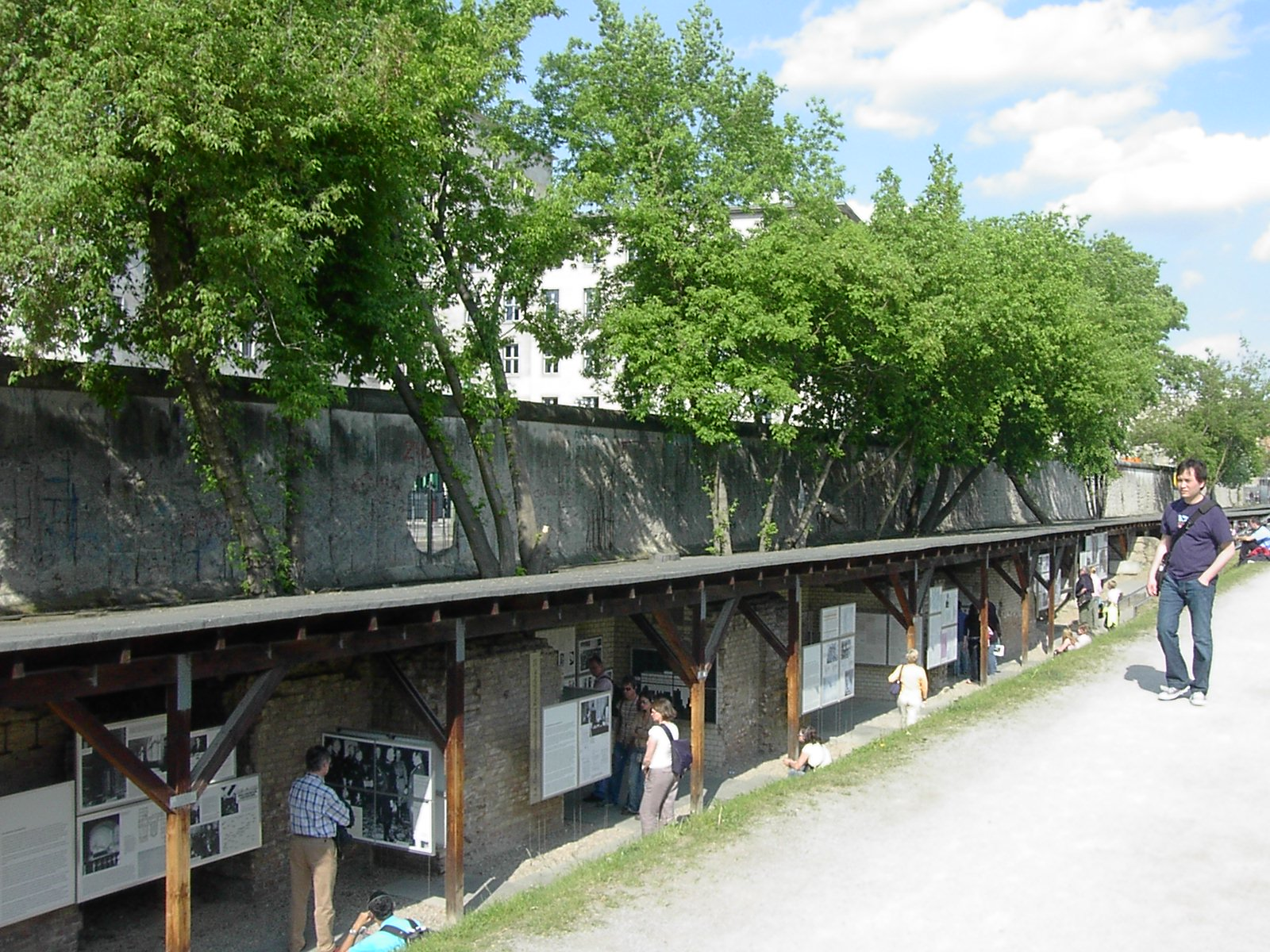
Part of the Topography of Terror museum. The preserved section of the Berlin Wall can be seen at the top of the picture, 2006

In June 2005 a new architectural design competition was launched following the aborted partial construction of Zumthor's design. Out of 309 submitted and 23 chosen drafts, architect Ursula Wilms from the Berlin architects office Heinle, Wischer and Partner and landscape architect Heinz W. Hallmann from Aachen won in January 2006 the final round. The draft included a two-storey, ashlar-formed, paned building with an available surface of 3,500 square metres. For the construction around €15 million was available. Another five to nine million Euro was used for the interior and the redevelopment of the historical site. These costs were defrayed jointly by both the federal government and the federal state of Berlin, each contributing 50%. The architects estimated construction costs at a maximum of €20 million and a construction period of two years.

The construction was finished on time and the new building was opened to the public on 7 May 2010.

=== Building ===
The open-air exhibition in the trench alongside the excavated segments of cellar wall on Niederkirchnerstraße (formerly Prinz-Albrecht-Straße) was retained and sheltered with glass. The room for the permanent exhibition is 800 cubic metres and presents the development and functions of the security apparatuses during the Nazi regime. A room for events at the back of the building can accommodate 200 participants. In the southern part of the area outside is a copse of black locust trees, the remains of "Harrys Autodrom" from the 1970s, whereas the rest of the open space is covered with greywacke. Around the flat-roofed building is a façade made of metal lamellae, which opens the building in a way that it is possible to look out of it to the surroundings anywhere on the ground floor of the building. In the basement is the seminar centre, the library with about 25,000 volumes, the memorial department and offices for 17 employees of the Topography of Terror Foundation.

== Exhibitions ==
=== Permanent exhibitions ===
With the inauguration of the new Documentation Centre, three permanent exhibitions are open to the public. All three are presented bilingually in German and English.

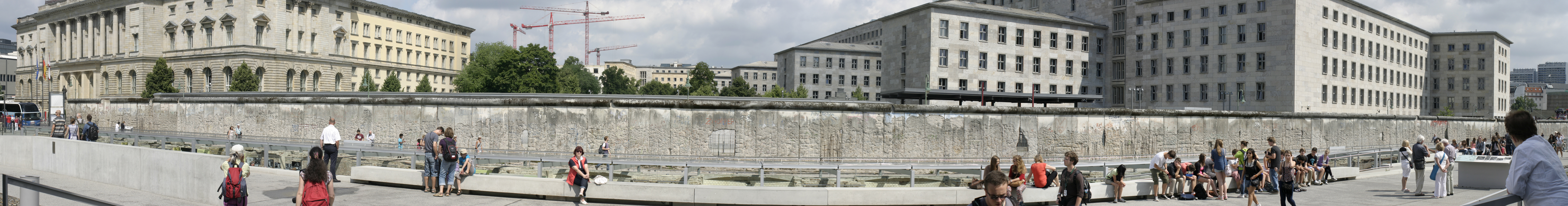
The section of the wall in July 2012; view from museum entrance

==== Topography of Terror. Gestapo, SS, and Reich Security Main Office on Wilhelm- and Prinz-Albrecht-Straße ====
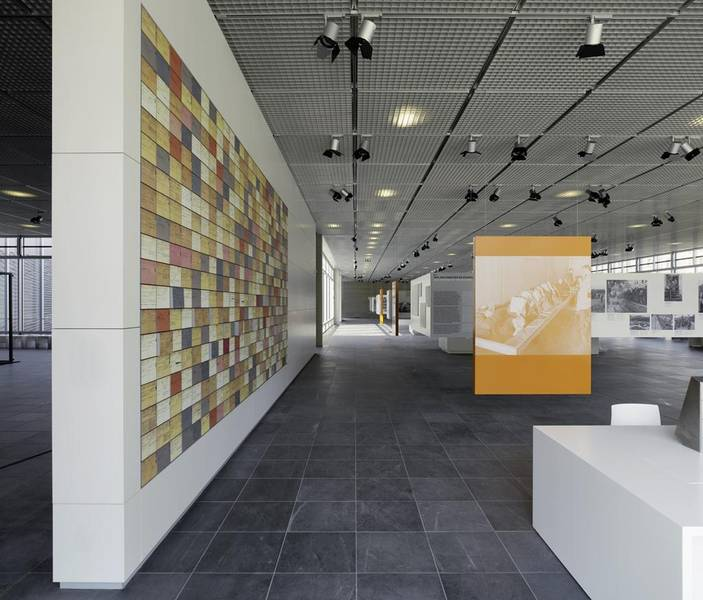
Exhibition hall in the NS documentation centre Topography of Terror, 2010

The "Topography of Terror" permanent exhibition was shown in the open air until the new Documentation Centre opened. The thoroughly revised and redesigned "Topography of Terror" permanent exhibition is presented over 800 square meters in the new building. The focus of the exhibition is the central institutions of the SS and police in the "Third Reich" as well as the crimes they perpetrated throughout Europe. Attention to the Nazi regime's many victim groups will assume a central place alongside the portrayal of the system of terror.

==== Berlin 1933–1945 Between Propaganda and Terror ====
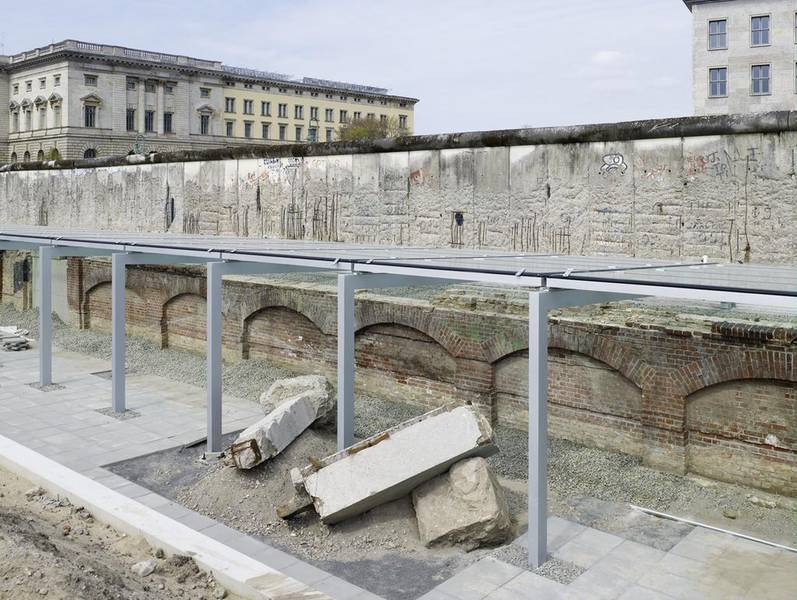
Exhibition trench at the site of the Topography of Terror, 2010

A permanent exhibition about the capital Berlin during the "Third Reich" will be on display in the exhibition trench alongside the excavated segments of cellar wall on Niederkirchnerstraße (formerly Prinz-Albrecht-Straße). It will address National Socialist policy in Berlin and its consequences for the city and its population.

==== Topography of Terror Site Tour. The History of the Site ====
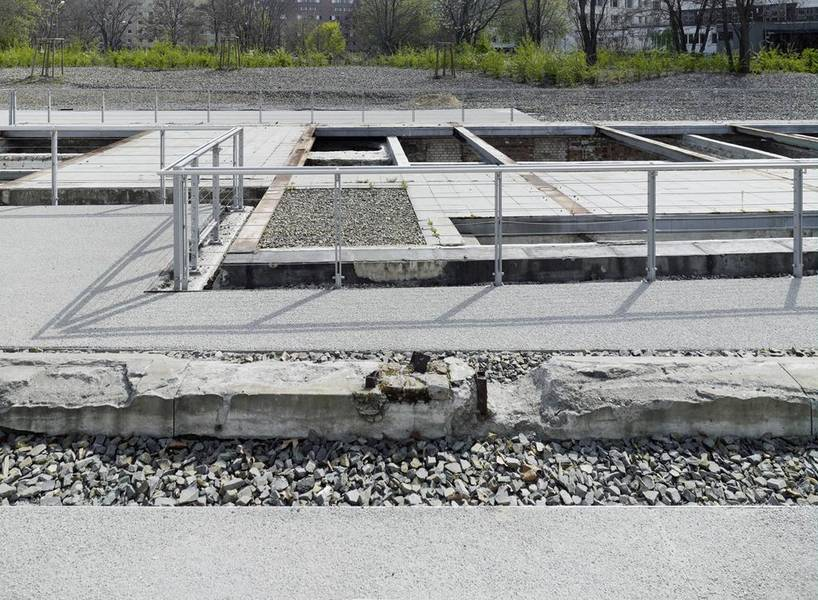
Site tour on the Prinz-Albrecht area, 2010

With the opening of the new Documentation Centre, the grounds of the "Topography of Terror" are once again completely open to the public. The site tour, which mainly follows the exposed building remnants, encompasses 15 stations. Informational signs provide an overview of the historic location and the site's use during the Nazi period and the postwar era. The tour also integrates remains of the Berlin Wall, which have been designated a historic monument.

=== Special and temporary exhibitions ===
==== The Face of the Ghetto. Pictures taken by Jewish Photographers in the Litzmannstadt Ghetto 1940–1944 ====
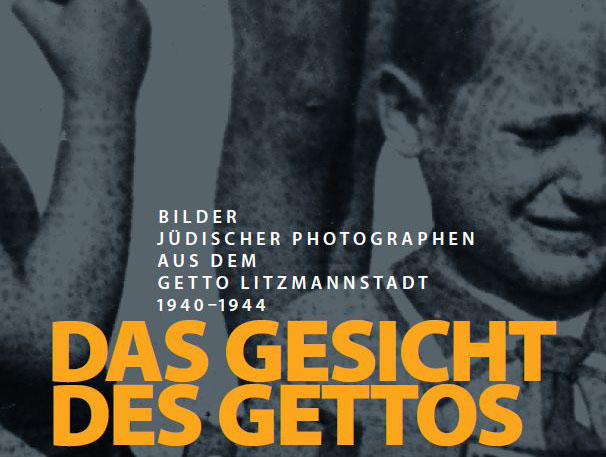

This special exhibition will be presented in the Topography of Terror Documentation Centre from 23 June 2010 on. It was developed by Dr. Ingo Loose and Dr. Thomas Lutz in cooperation with the State Archive in Łódź.

==== The "House Prison" at Gestapo Headquarters in Berlin. Terror and Resistance 1933–1945 ====
A bilingual German-English exhibition on the "House Prison" at the Gestapo Headquarters was shown in a special open-air exhibition area and included the 'ground memorial' including remains of former basement prison cells.

With altogether 400 photos and documents, for the first time the exhibition comprehensively related the history of the prison at Prinz-Albrecht-Straße 8 and reminded the fate of numerous detainees.

This presentation lasted from August 2005 to April 2008 on the site of the 'Topography of Terror'.

==== The Trial of Major War Criminals in Nuremberg ====
This exhibition was presented on the occasion of the 60th anniversary of the Nuremberg Trials and comprised around 110 photo and 50 text documents as well as 15 audio stations. It outlined the genesis, process, ambition and importance of the trial led by the Allies at Nuremberg focussing on the accused, whose culpability for the war crimes is demonstrated.

The presentation was located on the construction hoarding at the area of the Topography of Terror from October 2005 to April 2007.

==== The "People's Court"—Hitler's Political Tribunal ====
German-English documentation on occasion of the 70th anniversary of the foundation of the people's court.

The exhibition was developed in cooperation with the Memorial to the German Resistance.

=== Travelling exhibitions ===
==== Fire! Anti-Jewish Terror on "Kristallnacht" in November 1938 ====
The exhibition was developed in cooperation with the Foundation Memorial to the Murdered Jews of Europe and the Stiftung Neue Synagoge - Centrum Judaicum. The cooperative project presented on the 70th anniversary of the Kristallnacht pogrom presents historical documentation of the attack, seen around the world, on German Jewry after five and a half years of Nazi dictatorship.

The presentation was displayed from November 2008 to March 2009 in the Centrum Judaicum in Berlin.

== Library ==
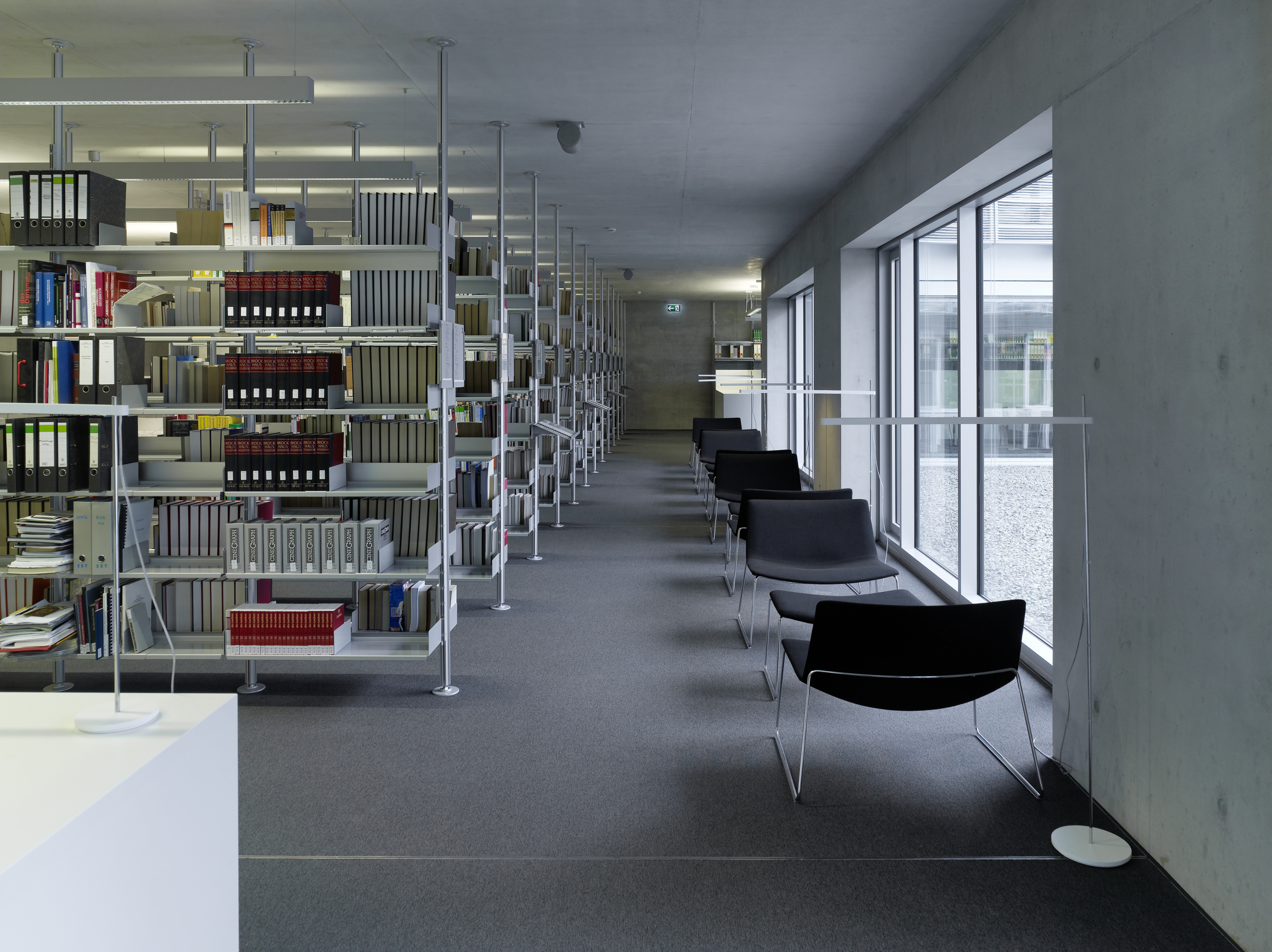
Library of the Topography of Terror, 2010

The library of the Topography of Terror Foundation is a special library focusing on the police, SS, Gestapo in the Third Reich and on the National Socialism in general. It currently comprises about 25 800 media elements, about 120 regularly and 100 closed magazines. It is situated around a fountain reminding of Zen gardens and freely accessible.

== Memorial Museums Department ==
The Topography of Terror Foundation provides comprehensive advice and coordination tasks in the field of national and international memorial sites. In Germany, the Memorial Museums Department is the central coordination office for memorial sites and initiatives for memorial sites and increasingly promotes the international collaboration.

== Exhibition ==
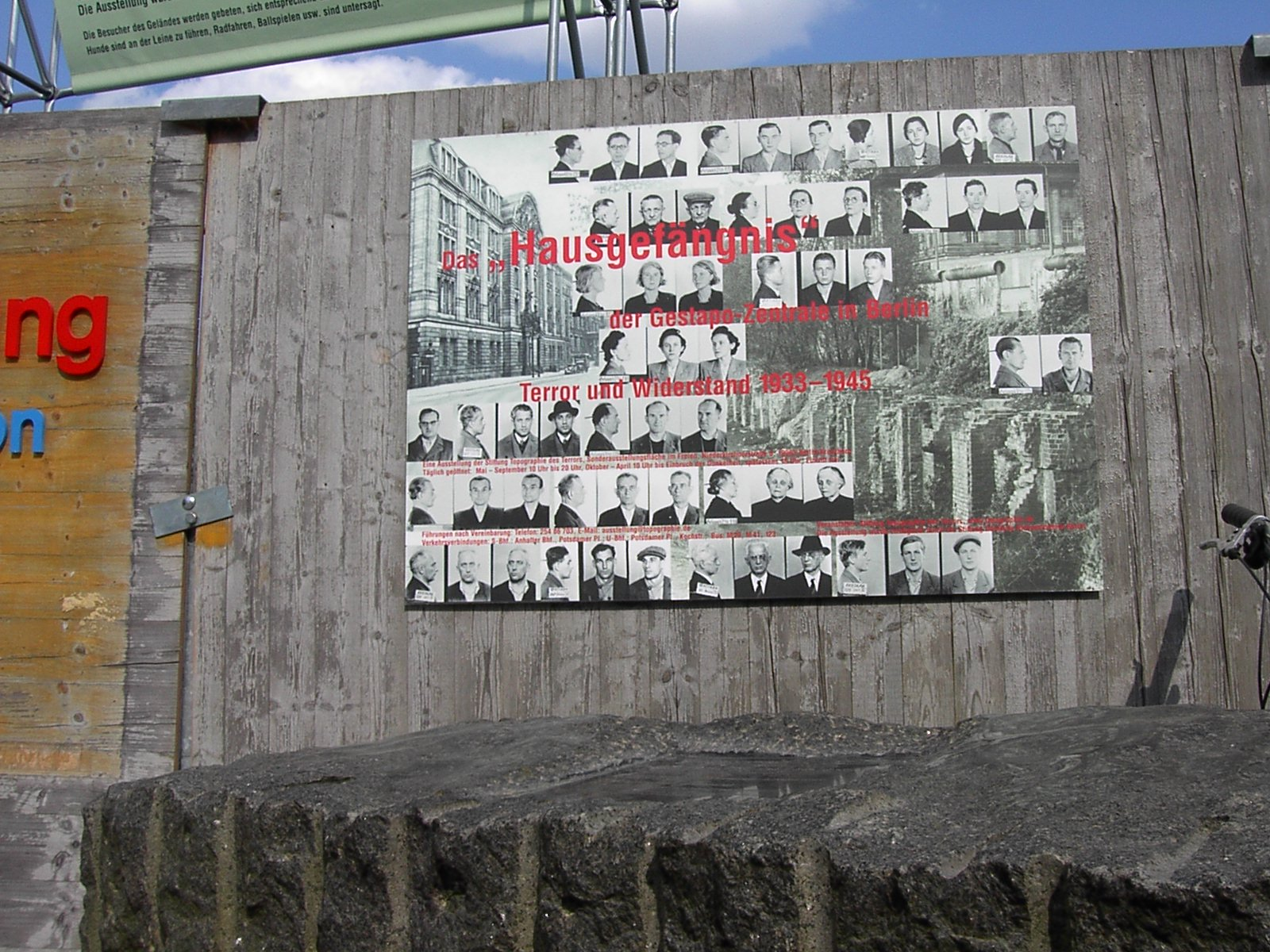
Images of political prisoners from the Gestapo archives

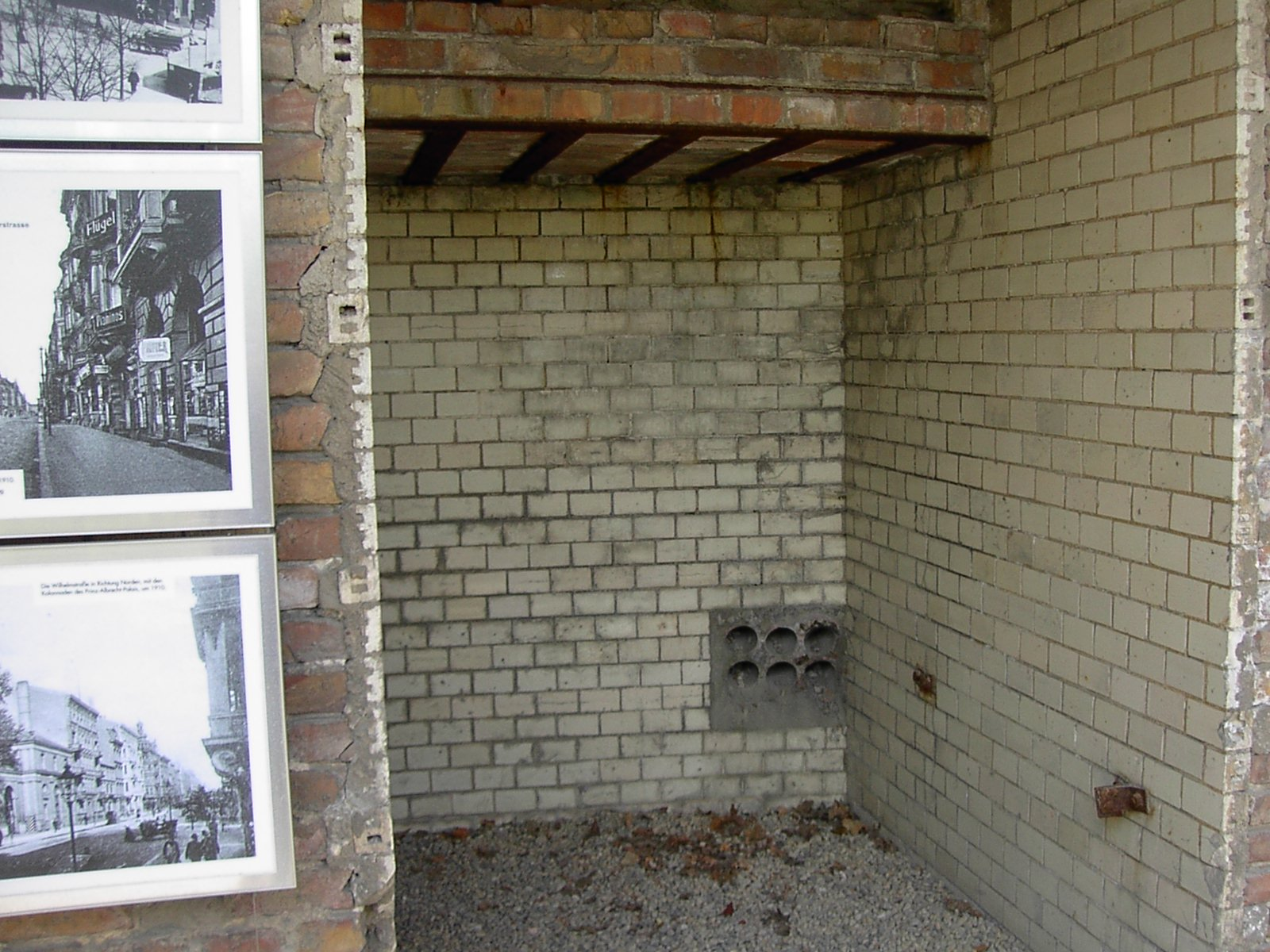
Excavated cells from the basement of the Gestapo headquarters

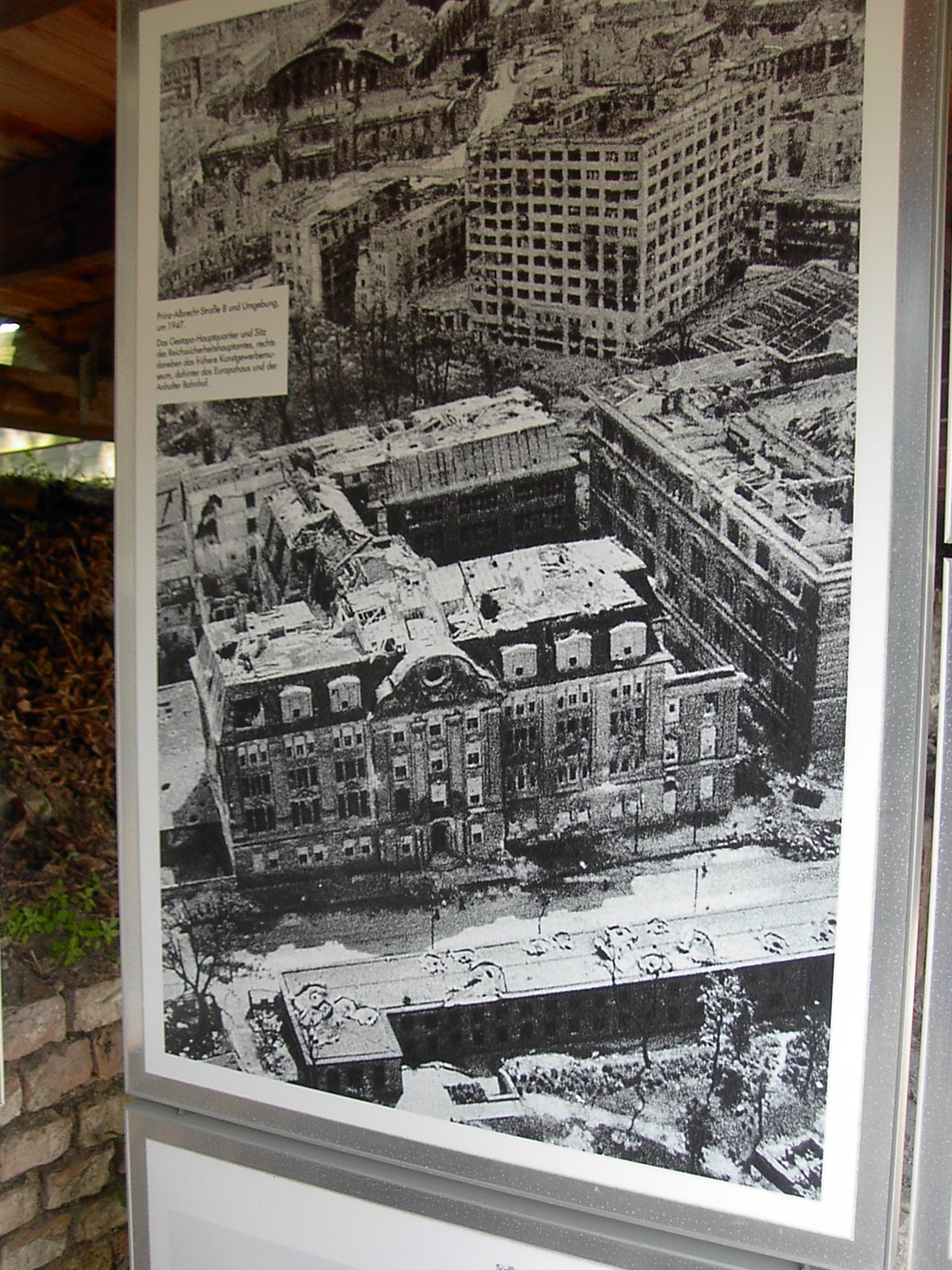
The bombed out shell of the Gestapo-SS headquarters, 1945

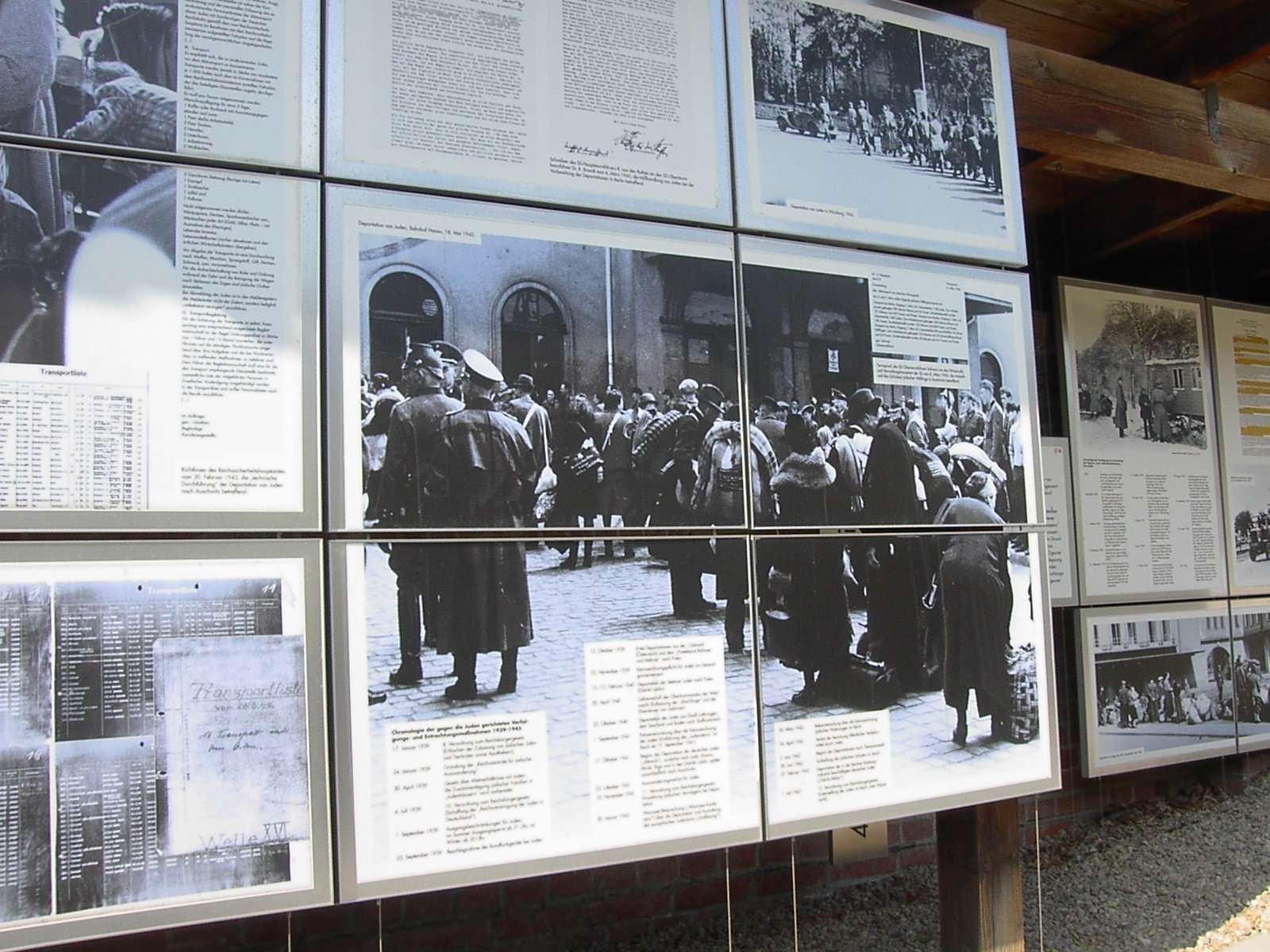
Photo display of Berlin Jews being deported to their deaths

== Nazi Forced Labour Documentation Centre ==
The last well-preserved former Nazi forced labour camp is located in Niederschöneweide. In the Second World War it served as one of the more than 3000 collective accommodations dispersed throughout the city for forced labourers. The Documentation Centre on Nazi Forced Labour opened in the summer of 2006 on a part of historical grounds that once belonged to the camp and which are today protected as a monument. The Documentation Centre offers two permanent exhibitions: "Forced Labour in the Daily Round 1938-1945" and "Between two stools. The History of the Italian Military Internees 1943-1945". Entrance and guided tours are free.

== "Topography of Terror" tours in Russia ==
In several Russian cities activists of Memorial have organised alternative tours, showing visitors locations, buildings and monuments associated with the political terror of the Soviet period, especially of Lenin and Stalin. Such tours are regularly held in Ryazan (Central Russia), Krasnoyarsk (Siberia) and Khabarovsk (Far East) while Moscow has tours and a website devoted to the theme, "It happened right here" (Это прямо здесь).

== Movies ==
- Schaltzentrale der Hölle. Was passiert mit der "Topographie des Terrors" in Berlin? Documentary, Germany, 2004, 7'08 Min., ZDF-aspekte, 20 July 2004
- Dokumentationen des Terrors. News programme, Germany, 2007, 1'52 Min., Production: ZDF-heute, first run: 2 November 2007
