= Thomas Lutz =

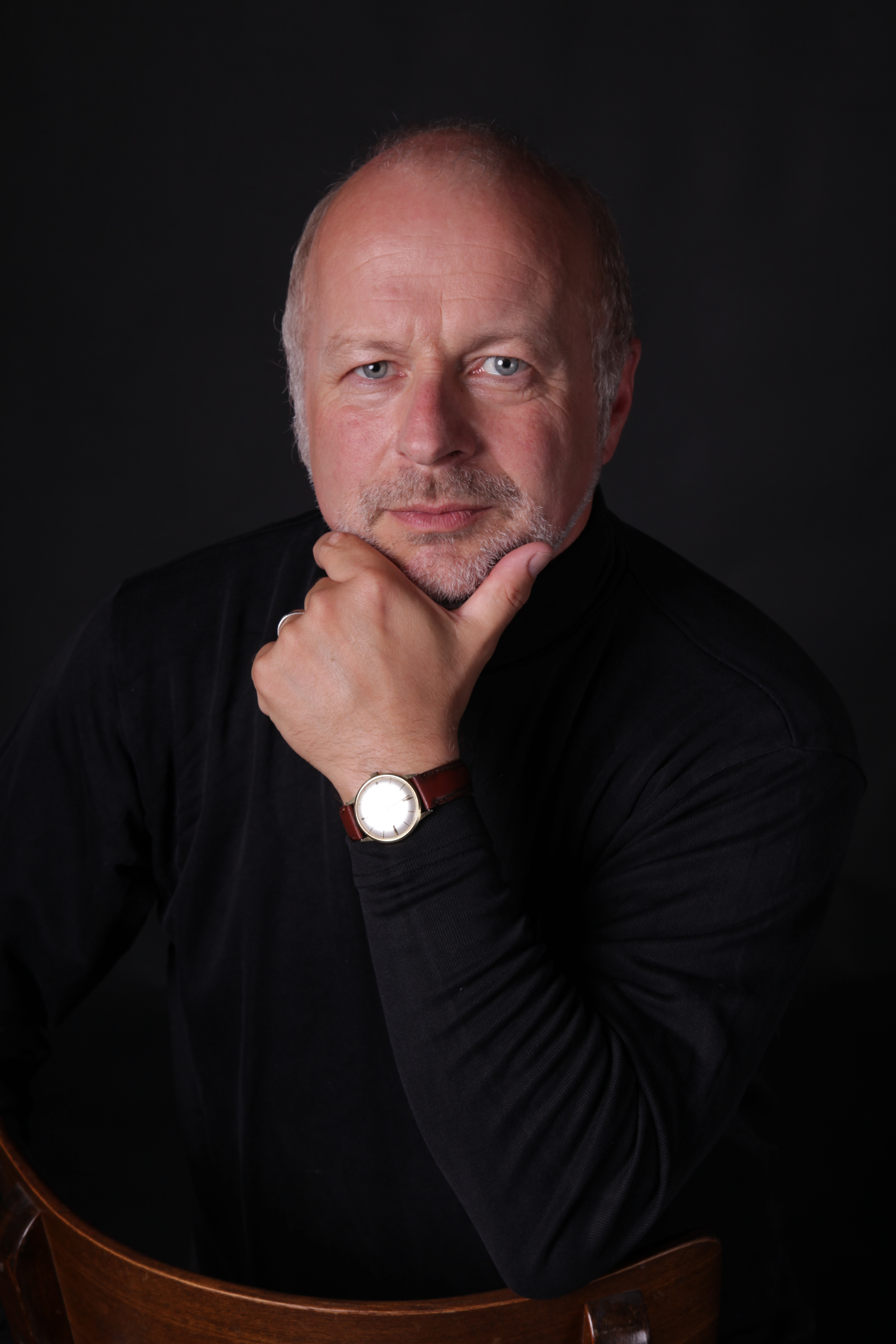
Photo: Heike Schmohl, c. 2010

Thomas Lutz (born c. 1957 in Darmstadt) is the head of the Memorial Museums Department of the Topography of Terror Foundation in Berlin, and active in Holocaust education and research at the national (German) and international level.

== Life ==
Thomas Lutz studied after the Abitur in 1975 at the Paul-Gerhard Gymnasium in Laubach (Oberhessen) History, Political Science and Sport in Marburg until 1981. In 1983 he took the second state examination in Benshaim in order to become a teacher at secondary schools.

As alternative service for Action Reconciliation Service for Peace (ARSP) Thomas Lutz supervised visiting groups at the Memorial and Museum Auschwitz-Birkenau. Since 1984 he has been working in the Berlin office of ARSP on the newly founded Memorial Museums Department which coordinates the work of memorial sites, especially those with a focus on recognition and documentation of Holocaust victims. His assignment also includes the counselling of governments, parliaments and non-governmental-organisations as well as a diverse educational work and public relations. Since 1992 he has been working in the same capacity for the Topography of Terror Foundation in Berlin.

Thomas Lutz is chairman of the international board of the Brandenburg Memorial Foundation. He is also the manager of the Working Group Concentration Camp Memorials in Germany. The federal commissioner for culture and media appointed him in the expert body for advising on the financial allocation in the context of the federal memorial site stock.

On an international level he co-founded the International Committee of Memorial Museums in Remembrance of the Victims of Public Crimes (ICMEMO) as International Committee of the International Council of Museums (ICOM) in 2001 in Barcelona. He is vice-president of the ICMEMO.

Since 2000 he has been one of the German delegates of the Task Force for International Cooperation on Holocaust Education, Remembrance, and Research (ITF) to which currently 33 countries are contributing. He was twice chairman of the foundation of Memorials and Museums Working Group of the International Holocaust Remembrance Alliance (IHRA).

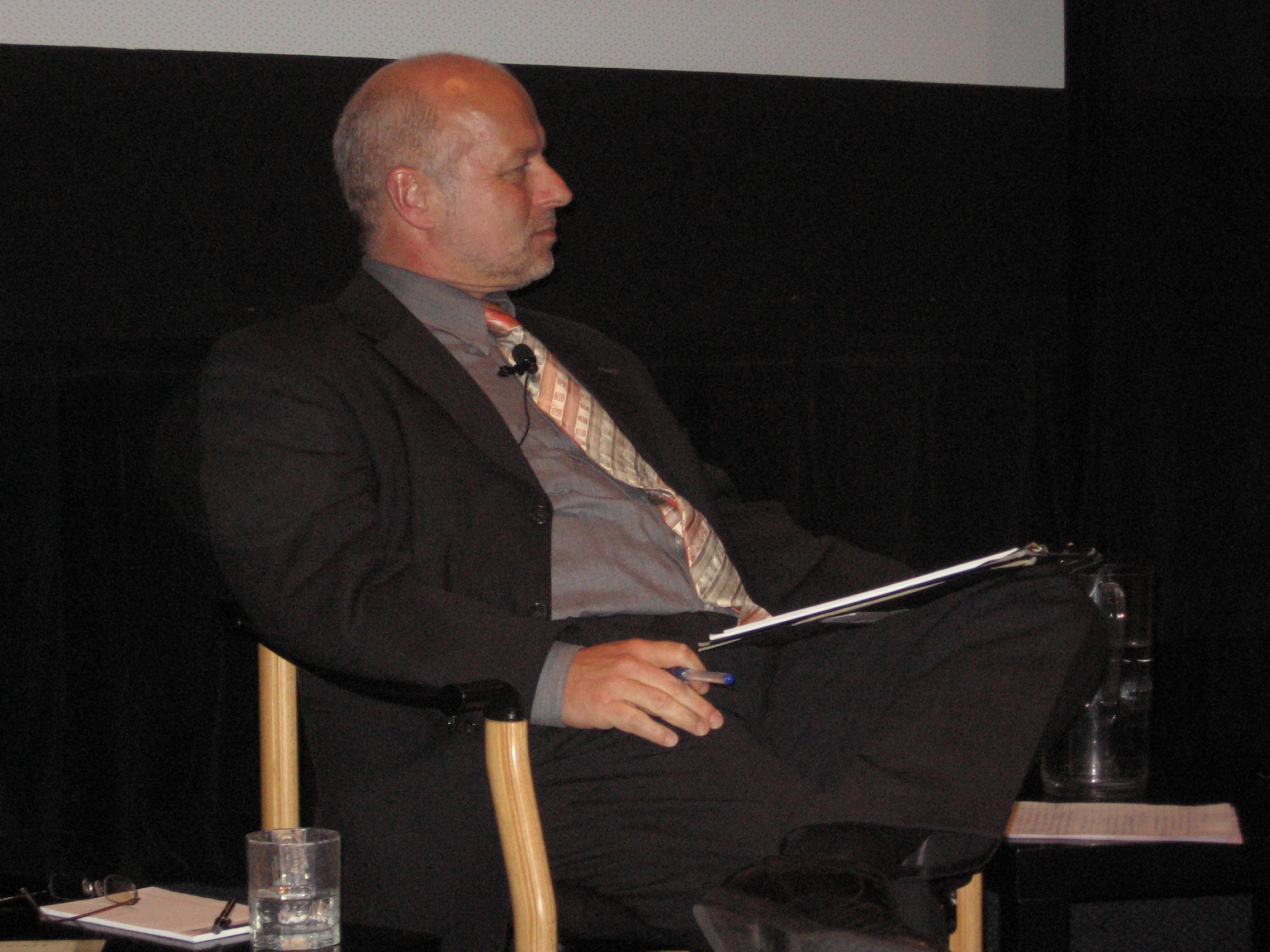
Goethe-Institute Washington DC, c. 2007. Photo: Goethe-Institute

As participant of the International Forum Mauthausen he is advising the Austrian Federal Ministry of the Interior on the remodelling of the Mauthausen-Gusen concentration camp memorial.

He is also in the board of trustees of the ARSP.

Lutz wrote his dissertation about the development of the permanent exhibitions that have been funded by the federal memorial site stock since 2000. Thereby he examined the museological development and the constructive educational work (Technische Universität Berlin, Fakultät I, Prof. Hanns-Fred Rathenow und Prof. Dr. Volkhard Knigge, Friedrich-Schiller-Universität Jena).

The focus of his historical research is the history of the 20th century in Germany concentrating on the incurrence conditions and history of the National Socialism (NS) and the political offenders committed during this period in German-occupied Europe.

== Publications ==
In addition to the publication of the Memorial Sites Journal, which is printed four times a year and the editorial supervision of the Online Memorial Sites Forum including a daily press overview in the area of memorial sites, Thomas Lutz published numerous books and essays.

=== Literature ===
- Thomas Lutz: Stasi = Gestapo?: in: Stasi-Dossier der Bundeszentrale für politische Bildung, online: http://www.bpb.de/geschichte/deutsche-geschichte/stasi/
- Thomas Lutz, Monika Hölscher, Viola Krause (ed.): Geschichte und Geschichtsbilder. Der Erste und Zweite Weltkrieg. POLIS 57, Hessische Landeszentrale für politische Bildung, Wiesbaden 2016
- International Holocaust Remembrance Alliance (ed.); Thomas Lutz, Corry Guttstadt, Bernd Rother, Yessica San Román (ed.): Bystanders, Rescuers or Perpetrators? The Neutral Countries and the Shoah, IHRA-series, vol 2, Berlin 2016, 336 S.
- Elke Gryglewski, Verena Haug, Gottfried Kößler, Thomas Lutz, Christa Schikorra (Hrsg.): Gedenkstättenpädagogik. Kontext, Theorie und Praxis der Bildungsarbeit zu NS-Verbrechen, Berlin 2015, ISBN 978-3-86331-243-5.
- Thomas Lutz: Die Entstehung, Entwicklung und gesellschaftliche Bedeutung des „Zeitzeugen"; in: Dagi Knellessen und Ralf Possekel im Auftrag der Stiftung EVZ (Hg.): Zeugnisformen. Bericht, künstlerische Werke und Erzählungen von NS-Verfolgten, Reihe Bildungsarbeit mit Zeugnissen, Band 1, Berlin 2015, S. 45-56.
- International Holocaust Remembrance Alliance (Hrsg.), Thomas Lutz, David Silberklang, Piotr Trojanski, Juliane Wetzel, Miriam Bistrovic (Mitherausgeber): Killing Sites - Research and Remembrance, IHRA-series, vol 1, Berlin 2015, ISBN 978-3-86331-233-6.
- International Holocaust Remembrance Alliance (Hg.); Thomas Lutz, Corry Guttstadt, Bernd Rother, Yessica San Román (Mitherausgeber): Bystanders, Rescuers or Perpetrators? The Neutral Countries and the Shoah, IHRA-series, vol 2, Berlin 2016, ISBN 978-3-86331-287-9.
- Stiftung Topographie des Terrors (Hrsg.), Thomas Lutz (Kurator): Das Gesicht des Gettos. Bilder jüdischer Photographen aus dem Getto Litzmannstadt 1940–1944. Ausstellungskatalog (deutsch/englisch), Berlin 2010, ISBN 978-3-941772-08-3.
- Thomas Lutz: Zwischen Vermittlungsanspruch und emotionaler Wahrnehmung. Die Gestaltung neuer Dauerausstellungen in Gedenkstätten für NS-Opfer in Deutschland und deren Bildungsanspruch Technische Universität Berlin: Berlin, 2009.
- Dietmar Sedlaczek, Thomas Lutz, Ulrike Puvogel, Ingrid Tomkowiak (Ed.): "minderwertig" und "asozial". Stationen der Verfolgung gesellschaftlicher Außenseiter Chronos Verlag: Zürich 2005, ISBN 978-3-0340-0716-0.
- Verena Radkau, Eduard Fuchs, Thomas Lutz (Hg.): Genozide und staatliche Gewaltverbrechen im 20. Jahrhundert Studien Verlag: Innsbruck, Wien, München, Bozen 2004, ISBN 978-3-7065-4060-5.
