= Nazi Forced Labour Documentation Centre =

Museum in Germany

Coordinates: 52.4531°N 13.5182°E

Nazi Forced Labour Documentation Centre, Berlin

The Nazi Forced Labour Documentation Centre is located in the Berlin district of Niederschöneweide in the Treptow-Köpenick district. It documents the fate of the forced labourers during the National Socialist era and is the only one of its kind in Germany.

== History ==
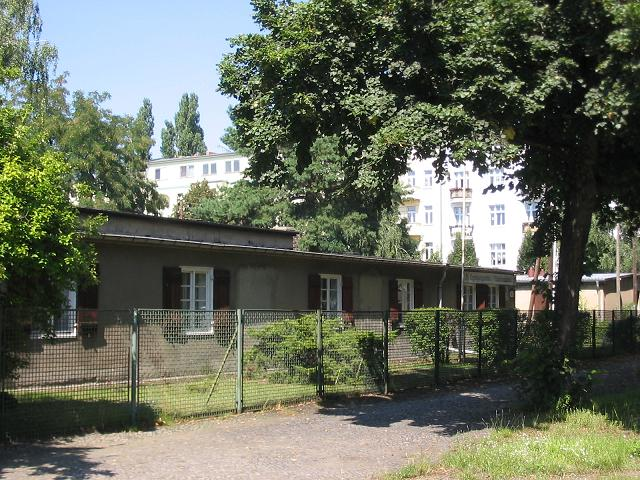
Barracks settlement of 1943 for forced labourers, listed as a historical monument

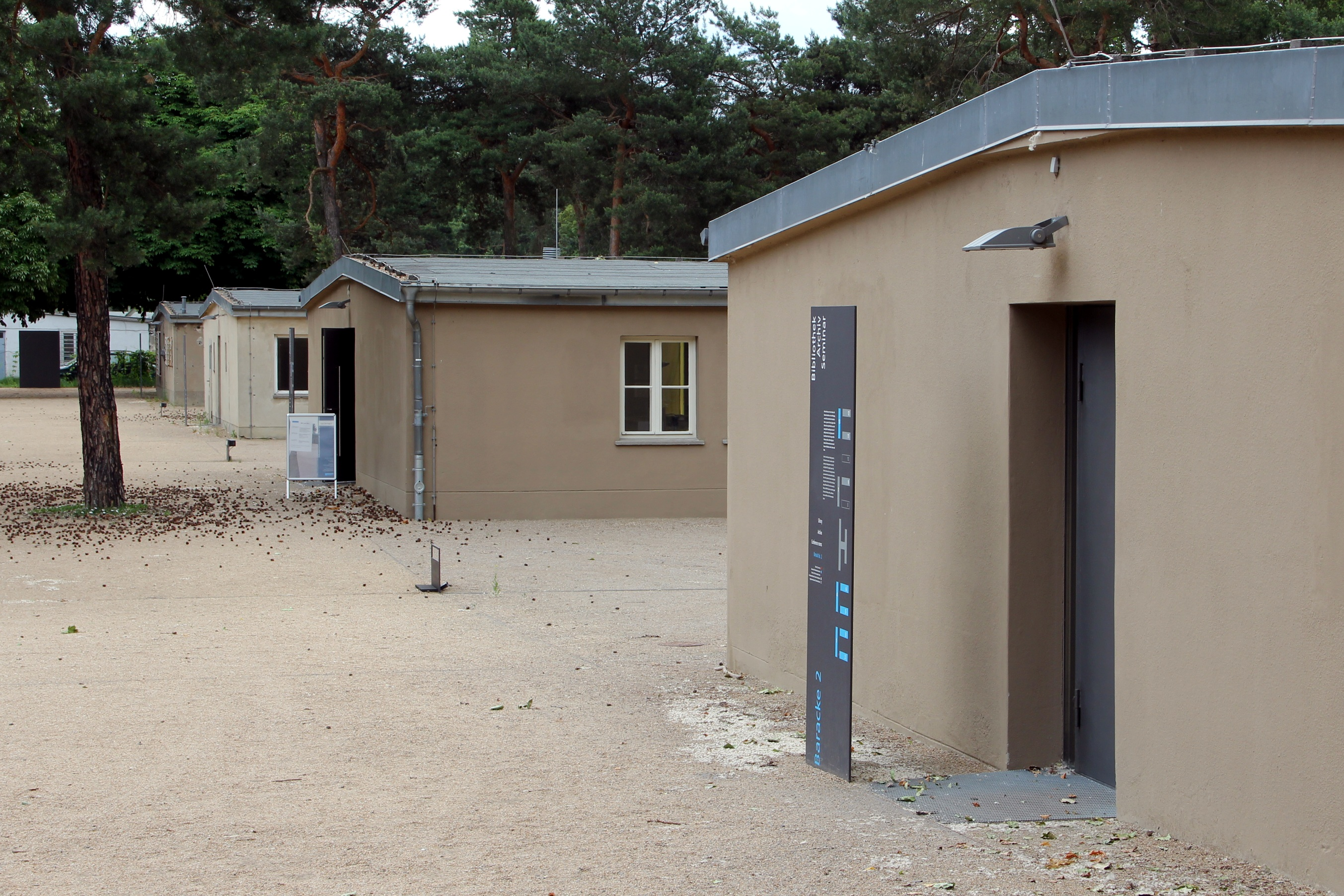
Barracks of the Nazi Forced Labour Documentation Centre

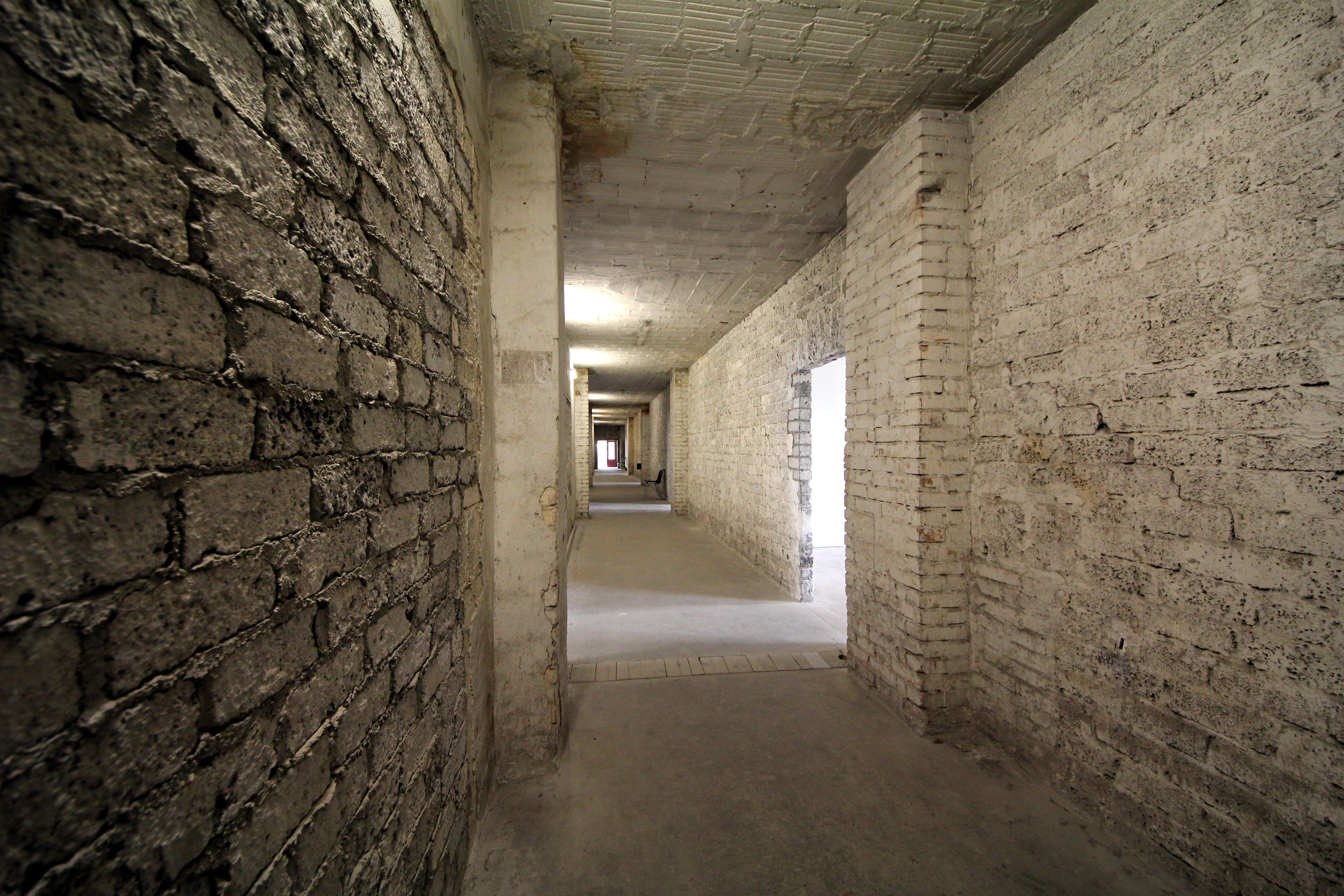
Interior view of Barrack 13

The approximately 32,000 m^{2} (340,000 sq ft) site between Britzer Strasse, Köllnischen Strasse and Rudower Strasse belonged to the largest part of the Deutsche Reichsbahn. It was overgrown with pine trees and served as a local recreation area for the residents. A much smaller area, around 1,000 m^{2}, was owned by the two Jewish brothers Kurt and Willy Mannheimer. In 1939, a home for the Hitler Youth was to be built on the site. However, due to the dense residential development adjacent to it, this idea was abandoned. In July 1939, GEHAG planned the construction of two-room apartments, but this plan was not implemented despite the release of the building site. Instead, the Mannheimer brothers were expropriated and their corner property on Britzer/Köllnischen Strasse was transferred to the countries asset management in June 1942. Due to the progressing acts of war, there were now other plans for the forest plot. In 1943, planning began for the construction of a residential camp. It should consist of 13 symmetrically arranged stone barracks and offer place for over 2000 foreign forced labourers. The dense tree cover, of which some pines are still preserved today, was hoped to provide some protection against air raids. In addition, the barracks were made of stone and not wood, which was typical at the time. Some received an air-raid shelter, although this was not permitted according to the legal guidelines. It was planned under the name "Lager 75/76" by the general building inspector for the imperial capital, Albert Speer, and his authority subordinated. The designation 75/76 indicates that, strictly speaking, there were two camp buildings connected by the central supply building. The architect was Hans Freese, who was professor at the Technische Hochschule in Charlottenburg at the time and later became rector of Technische Universität Berlin.

In addition to around 500 Italian military internees and civilian workers, forced labourers from Eastern Europe possibly also lived in six barracks of the 'Italian camp'. In the other half of the double camp, two barracks temporarily served as subcamps for female prisoners who had to work at the battery factory Pertrix (VARTA).

After the Second World War, the camp area was briefly used by the Red Army; later, in 1946, a GDR serum institute moved into the western area on Britzer Strasse. One barrack was demolished, others were used for different purposes. After the fall of communism, large parts of the surrounding industrial enterprises collapsed and were liquidated. This posed the question for the district as to how the area should be developed in the future in view of the progressing deindustrialisation. In 1993, investigations in preparation for redevelopment revealed that Niederschöneweide contained the largely preserved remains of a forced labour camp from the Nazi era. The first open-air exhibition was held on the site in 1995. Since then, various initiatives and individuals have been campaigning for the erection of a documentation and memorial site. They have been united in the Förderverein Dokumentationszentrum NS-Zwangsarbeit since 2004. In 2014, in the eastern half of the camp on Köllnischen Straße, there was a physiotherapy centre with sauna, a day-care centre and a bowling club.

== Memorial ==
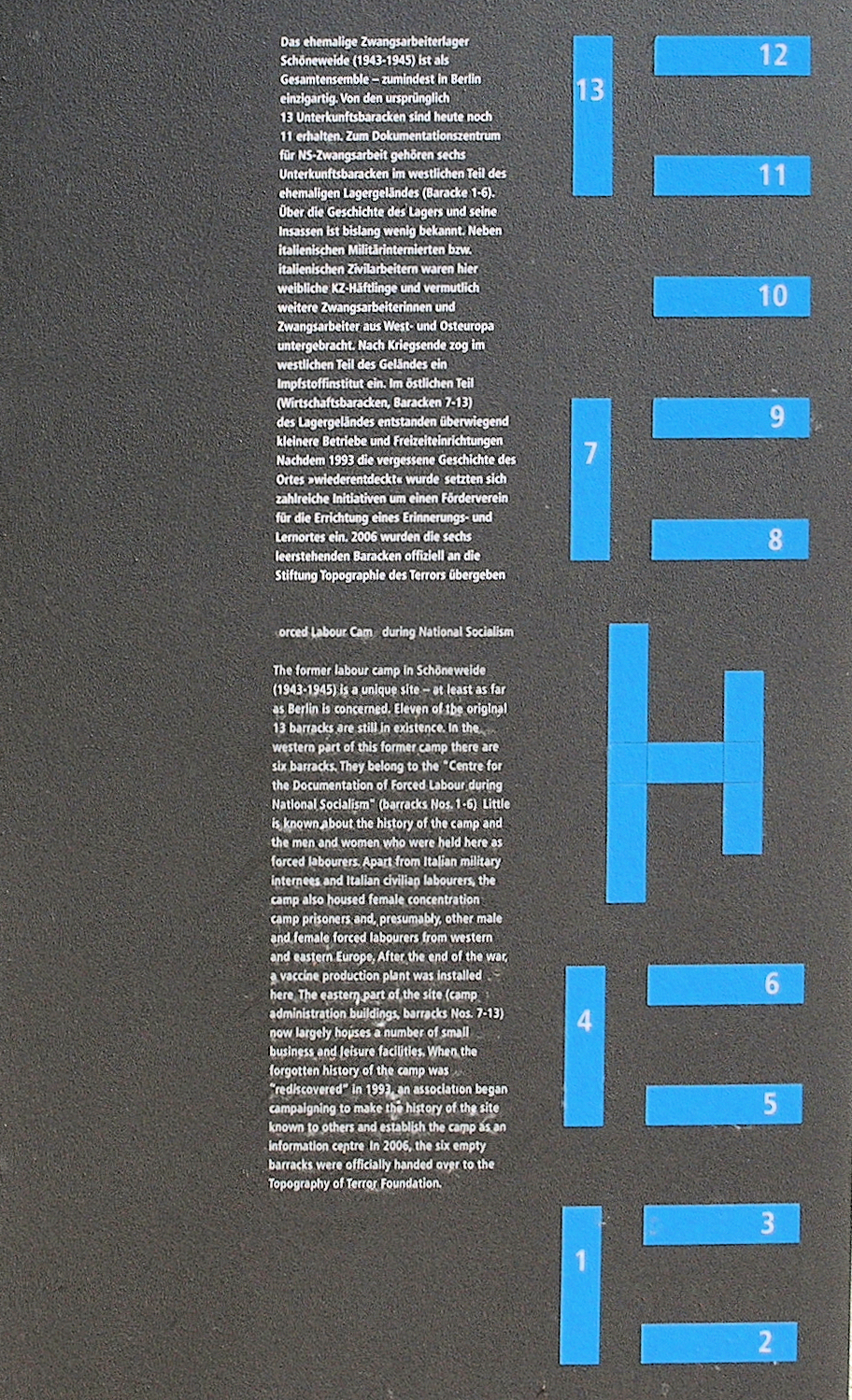
Memorial plaque of the Documentation Centre

Since July 2001, the site has been marked with a commemorative plaque. Being the last of around 3000 Berlin forced labourer shelters, the entire 3.3 ha (0.033 km^{2}) ensemble has been a historically listed monument since 1995.

The Topography of Terror Foundation has been in charge of the project since April 2005. As part of the memorial site concept, six of the eleven barracks still existing today were secured. Two of them were converted into lecture, exhibition and seminar rooms as well as a library and archive. The handing over of the keys for the Nazi Forced Labour Documentation Centre in Berlin-Schöneweide on 24 August 2006 was the beginning of a continuous and intensive preparation and presentation of facts on the subject of forced labour at this authentic location. In addition to the changing exhibitions, lectures, readings and interviews with contemporary witnesses have taken place in the rooms. The research centre is headed by the historian Christine Glauning.

On 30 August 2010, the so-called "Barrack 13" was opened to the public. It marks the eastern edge of the camp site. It was built as one of the first buildings. Many original traces, including inscriptions of former inmates, are still preserved, especially in the air raid shelter. The green camouflage can still be seen from the outside. The unrendered bricks, the washroom and the toilet room have also been preserved in their original state. In one of the rooms there is the wash fountain from Barrack 4. The original wooden furniture is no longer available. According to contemporary witnesses, it consisted of nine bunk beds, nine double wardrobes, a table, some garden chairs, a cast iron stove and a bucket. A sparse incandescent lamp served as lighting. After the Second World War, this barrack was used as a material store and for various workshops. The VEB Kühlautomat Berlin temporarily maintained a training workshop there. Antiques and building materials have been stored there since 2003. On the ground floor, some partition walls were torn out, but these were pulled back in during the repairs. A gap between the partition wall and the original building shows that these are not the original walls. As a cautiously restored architectural testimony, it complements the educational and socio-political mission of the Nazi Forced Labour Documentation Centre. The official opening took place with the participation of diplomatic representatives from Italy and Poland as well as a former Polish forced labourer who had to work in the nearby S-Bahn main workshop in 1944/1945.

== Permanent exhibitions ==
On 8 May 2013, the first permanent exhibition "Alltag Zwangsarbeit 1938-1945" was opened in Barrack No. 2. On 28 November 2016 the second permanent exhibition opened "Zwischen allen Stühlen. The history of Italian military internees 1943-1945".

=== Forced Labour in the Daily Round 1938–1945 ===
The permanent exhibition "Forced Labour in the Daily Round 1938-1945" presents the history of forced labour during National Socialism as an omnipresent mass phenomenon. It shows the everyday life of the men, women and children deported to work - in the camp, at work and in contact with Germans. It illustrates the extent to which the lives of forced labourers were shaped by the racist hierarchy of the Nazi Regime.

=== Between Two Stools. The History of Italian Military Internees 1943–1945 ===
During World War II, Nazi Germany and fascist Italy were initially allies. On 8 September 1943 Italy withdrew from the alliance. The German Wehrmacht then captured the Italian soldiers and officers. About 650,000 Italians were transported to the German Reich and the occupied territories. With the founding of the Repubblica Sociale Italiana (RSI) in 1944, the prisoners were declared "military internees". Therefore, despite the new fascist alliance and without regard to international law, they could be used as forced labourers in armaments. The permanent exhibition tells the story of the Italian military internees. It spans the spectrum from the German-Italian alliance partnership in the Second World War to the present day treatment of the subject. The individual chapters deal with central aspects of imprisonment, transport, forced labour, the end of the war and Memory.

== Guided tours and seminars ==
Admission to the exhibitions is free, and free guided tours and seminars - also for school classes - take place upon request. Public guided tours without registration are offered every first and third Sunday of the month at 3 p.m. Barrack 13 is only open as part of a guided tour and all day on the International Museum Day and Open Monument Day. A library, collection and archive are available on request.

== Future memorial work ==
Thanks to a donation from the Johanna Quandt Foundation, two previously unused barracks were expanded in 2015. On 12 November 2015, the barracks were opened to the public. Barrack 5 now houses special exhibition, event and archive rooms as well as the library. An international youth meeting place was opened in Barrack 6. The operation of both houses as well as the work of the youth meeting place is secured for the time being by the donation of the Quandt family for ten years.
