= Joachim Schlör =

German cultural scientist

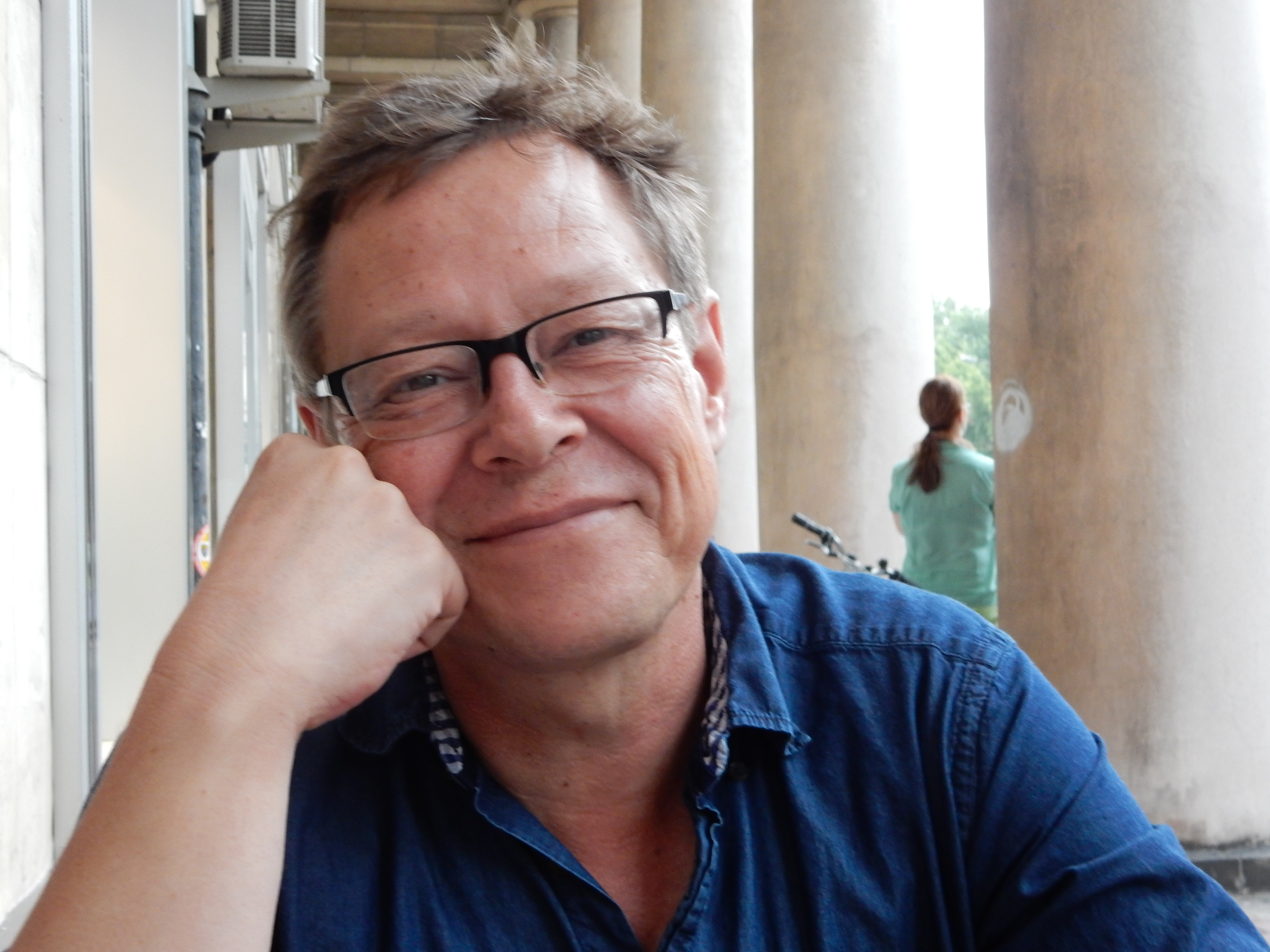
Joachim Schlör

Joachim Schlör (born 1960 in Heilbronn) is a culture scientist and professor at the Parkes Institute for Jewish/non-Jewish Relations at the University of Southampton. Previously, he lectured at the University of Potsdam and was director of the network of Jewish and rabbinical studies. He is the "intellectual father" of the post graduate program there and has contributed to what is called the "spatial turn" in Jewish studies.

== Life ==
Joachim Schlör worked as a volunteer with Andreas Maislinger at the Poland-department of the Action Reconciliation Service for Peace in the years 1980 and 1981. From 1993 until 1999 he has been working as scientific worker at the Moses Mendelssohn Center for European-Jewish Studies and later as assistant professor for modern history at the University of Potsdam. In 2006 he received a professorship in Modern Jewish/non-Jewish Relations at the University of Southampton. He retired as a professor in 2023.

== Publications ==
- Das Ich der Stadt. Debatten über Judentum und Urbanität. Vandenhoeck & Ruprecht, Göttingen
- Das Denkmal für die ermordeten Juden Europas. Memorial to the Murdered Jews of Europe. Prestel Verlag, München
- Endlich im Gelobten Land? Deutsche Juden unterwegs in eine neue Heimat. Aufbau-Verlag, Berlin
- Hotel Europa. Notizen von den Rändern des Kontinents. Wissenschaftliche Buchgesellschaft, Darmstadt
- Tel-Aviv. From dream to city. Reaktion, London 1999
  - Tel-Aviv: Vom Traum zur Stadt. Reise durch Kultur und Geschichte. Bleicher, Gerlingen
- „Das versteht sich nicht von selbst…“ – Cela ne va pas de soi, in: Freddy Raphael, Utz Jeggle (Hrsg.): D’une rive a l’autre. Rencontres ethnologiques franco-allemandes. Kleiner Grenzverkehr. Deutsch-französische Kulturanalysen. Maison des sciences de l’homme, Paris 1997, ISBN 2-7351-0682-9, S. 285–304
- Nights in the big City. Reaktion, London 1998
  - Nachts in der großen Stadt. Paris, Berlin, London 1840–1930. Artemis und Winkler, München 1991
