= Action for World Solidarity =

Germany-based non-profit organization

- Aktionsgemeinschaft Solidarische Welt e.V.
- Formation: 1957
- Type: registered association
- Headquarters: Berlin
- Region served: Africa, Asia, Latin America
- Methods: support of local grassroots initiatives
- Fields: women's rights, environmental protection, human rights
- Budget: 1.095.840,90€ (2016)
- Staff: 10
- Website: www.aswnet.de
- Formerly called: Aktionsgemeinschaft für die Hungernden ("Action for the Hungry")

Action for World Solidarity (German: Aktionsgemeinschaft Solidarische Welt e.V. or in short ASW) is a non-profit and non-governmental association based in Berlin. The organization supports projects in Asia, Africa and Latin America.

Founded in 1957, Action for World Solidarity is one of the oldest organizations in Germany active in development policy.

Since its beginnings and unlike many other organizations, the association does not send development workers to other countries. It has been a trendsetter in terms of supporting projects that are set up by local people and are implemented on their sole responsibility. The objective of Action for World Solidarity's support is to strengthen disadvantaged people or groups with financial and ideal support, in order to create a self-contained social transformation.

Priority issues are respect for human rights, women's empowerment and protection of the environment in the countries of the south.

== Main focus and objective ==
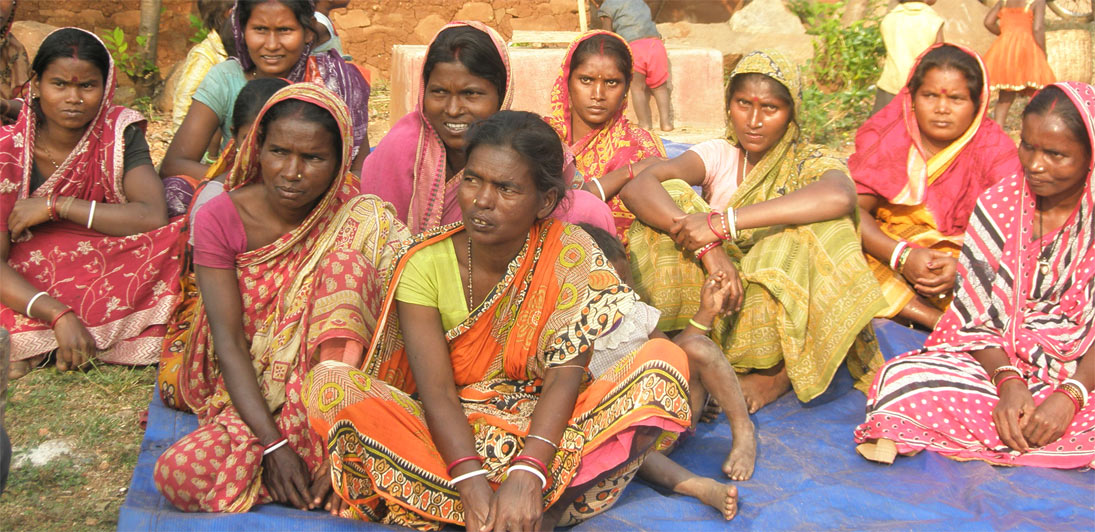
Example of a self-help group for women in India

Action for World Solidarity's vision is a solidary world, in which the existing gap between rich and poor, north and south, powerful and disenfranchised is abolished.

Funded projects have to meet one main criteria: they should be initiated and implemented by local people and serve the entire community. Action for World Solidarity's priority issues are women's empowerment by means of self-organization and self-help groups as well as the promotion of sustainable and organic agriculture.

Project countries are located in Africa, Asia and Latin America.

Besides improving the situation of the people living in the south, the association's additional aim is a rethinking in the countries of the north. Thus, information and education work in Germany adds to Action for World Solidarity's activities as well.

== History ==
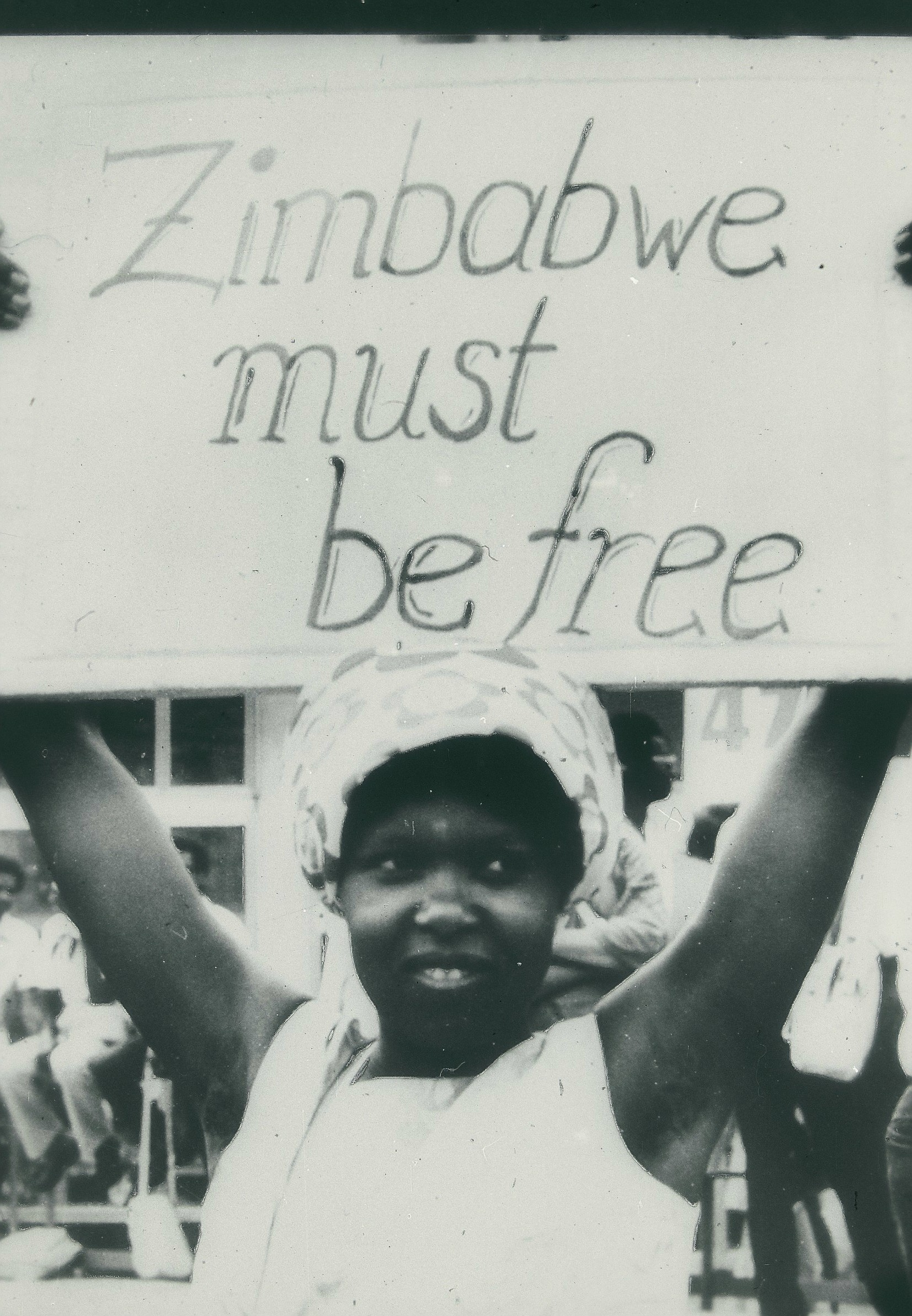
ASW supported the fight against white supremacy in Zimbabwe in 1980

The birth of Action for World Solidarity is the Appeal for the Hungry (orig. "Aufruf für die Hungernden"), initiated by Lothar Kreyssig in 1957 and signed by well-known personalities of German public life, including Heinrich Albertz, Willy Brandt, Heinz Galinski, Kurt Scharf and Otto Suhr. People were requested to forego a meal once a week and to donate the thereby saved money for starving people in poor countries. Subsequently, Action for the Hungry (orig. "Aktionsgemeinschaft für die Hungernden") was founded.

The construction of the Berlin Wall in 1961 led to a split-up of Action for the Hungry. While being instrumental in founding the non-governmental organization INKOTA (Information, Coordination, Conferences) with help of the evangelic church in East Germany, the non-denominational Action for World Solidarity evolved in West Germany.

In 1975, the former board of directors decided to end the implementation of child sponsorships due to the realization that while child sponsorships indeed raise the donation income, local children hardly benefit from them. Sponsorships isolated children and estranged them from their family and village community. Until 1982, the support of children's homes ran out and since then Action for World Solidarity intensively promotes community aid.

Already in the early stages, Action for World Solidarity sustained an office in India. Since the 70s, more and more Indian partners were put in charge for mentoring the projects in India. This evolution of the AWS India Office resulted in the foundation of the Centre for World Solidarity CWS in 1992, which became an independently acting partner of Action for World Solidarity.

Action for World Solidarity started education and campaign work in the 70s and 80s. Four times a year, the children's magazine SAMsolidam was published to eliminate prejudice before they arise. The production was ceased in 2000.

== Funding ==
Action for World Solidarity is largely financed by private donations. Major projects are supported by third-party funds.

== Transparency and donation seal ==
Since 1994, Action for World Solidarity is awarded the Donation Seal-of-Approval from the German Central Institute for Social Issues (DZI) and is accordingly recognized as worthy of support.

Since 2011, the association is signatory of the Initiative Transparente Zivilgesellschaft (Action for a Transparent Civil Society) by Transparency International.

== Memberships, collaborations ==
Action for world Solidarity is member of VENRO (Association of German Development and Humanitarian Aid NGOs), BER (Developmental Advice of Berlin), Berlin Global Village, BUKO (Federal Coordination of Internationalism), Gemeinsam für Afrika (Together for Africa), Dalit Solidarität Deutschland (Dalit Solidarity Germany), KoBra (Cooperation Brasil), Zimbabwe Netzwerk (Zimbabwe Network) and Allianz Rechtssicherheit für politische Willensbildung (Alliance Legal Certainty for the Forming of the Political Will).
