= 2024 Indian general election in Delhi =

18th Indian general election in NCT of Delhi

- 25 May 2024

All 7 Delhi seats in the Lok Sabha
- Opinion polls
- Turnout: 58.78% (▼1.82%)
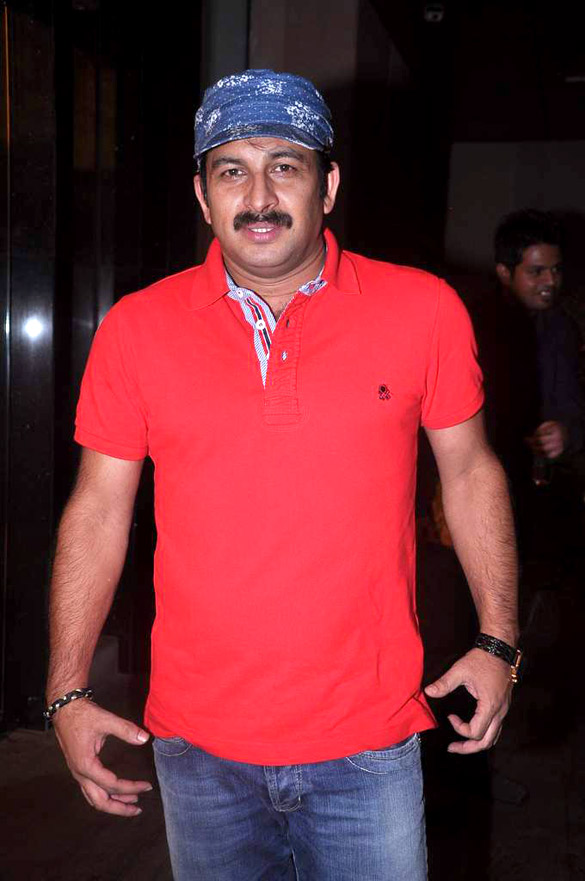

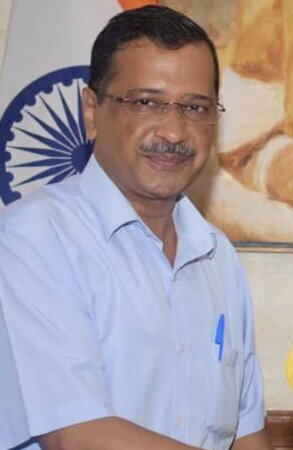

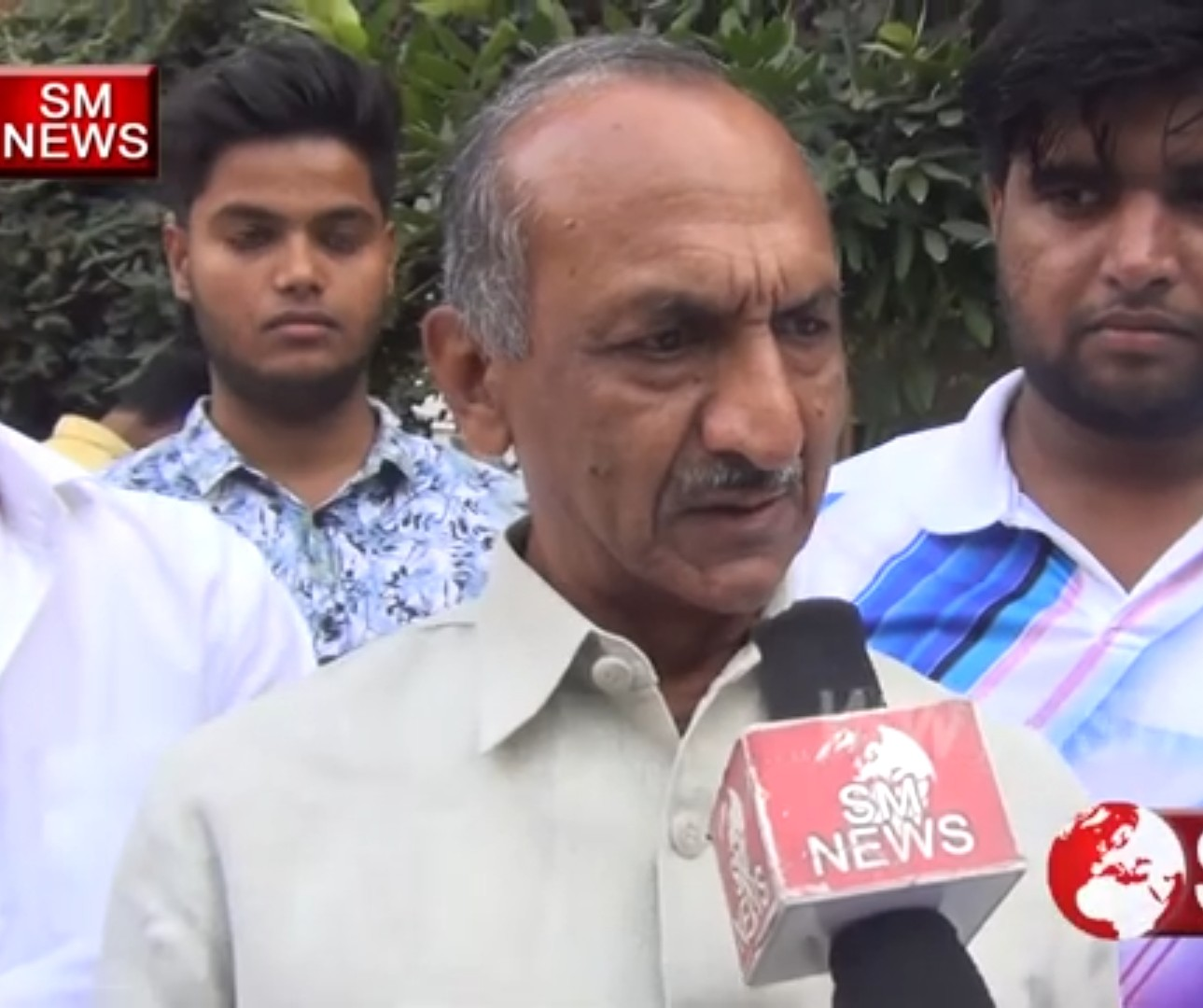
	First party	Second party
Leader	Manoj Tiwari	Arvind Kejriwal
Party	BJP	AAP
Alliance	NDA	INDIA
Leader since	2021	2012
Leader's seat	North-East Delhi (won)	Did not contest
Last election	56.86%, 7 seats	18.11%, 0 seat
Seats won	7	0
Seat change	Steady	Steady
Popular vote	4,844,180	2,154,001
Percentage	54.35%	24.17%
Swing	▼2.50%	▲5.97%
	Third party
Leader	Jai Prakash Agarwal
Party	INC
Alliance	INDIA
Leader since	2022
Leader's seat	Chandni Chowk (lost)
Last election	22.51%, 0 seat
Seats won	0
Seat change	Steady
Popular vote	1,685,494
Percentage	18.91%
Swing	▼3.72%
- Seatwise Result Map of the 2024 general election in Delhi
Prime Minister before election
Narendra Modi
BJP
Prime Minister after election
Narendra Modi
BJP

The 2024 Indian general election was held in Delhi on 25 May 2024 to elect 7 members of the 18th Lok Sabha. The result of the election were declared on 4 June 2024.

== Election schedule ==
On 16 March 2024, the Election Commission of India announced the schedule of the 2024 Indian general election, with Delhi scheduled to vote during the 6th phase on 25 May 2024.

Poll event	Phase
Poll event	VI
Notification date	29 April
Last date for filing nomination	6 May
Scrutiny of nomination	7 May
Last Date for withdrawal of nomination	9 May
Date of poll	25 May
Date of counting of votes/Result	4 June 2024
No. of constituencies	7

== Parties and alliances ==
=== National Democratic Alliance ===
National Democratic Alliance

Party	Flag	Symbol	Leader	Seats contested
Bharatiya Janata Party			Manoj Tiwari	7

=== Indian National Developmental Inclusive Alliance ===
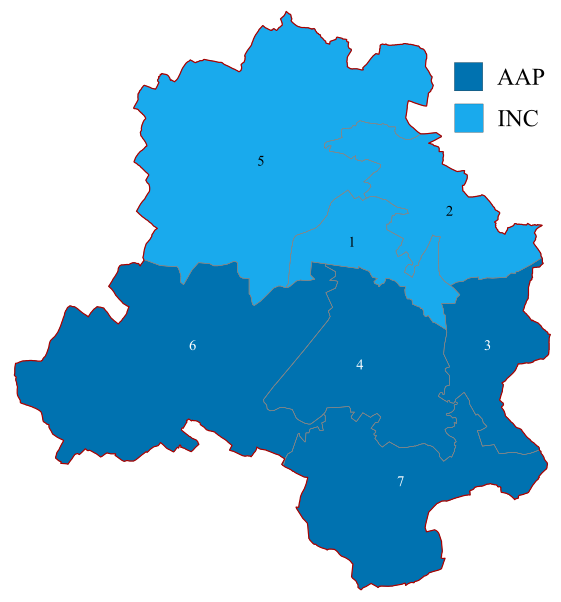
Indian National Developmental Inclusive Alliance

Party	Flag	Symbol	Leader	Seats contested
Aam Aadmi Party			Arvind Kejriwal	4
Indian National Congress			Devender Yadav	3
Total				7

=== Others ===
Party	Symbol	Seats contested
Bahujan Samaj Party		7
Navarang Congress Party		7
Peoples Party of India (Democratic)		6
Ambedkarite Party of India		4
Public Political Party		4
Gareeb Aadmi Party		3
Rashtriya Republican Party		3
Right to Recall Party		3
Aapki Apni Party (Peoples)		2
Akhil Bhartiya Parivar Party		2
All India Forward Bloc		2
Bahujan Dravida Party		2
Bharatheeya Jawan Kisan Party		2
Bharatiya Jan Jagriti Party		2
Bharatiya Sampuran Krantikari Party		2
Bharatiya Liberal Party		2
Jindabad Kranti Party		2
Prabuddha Republican Party		2
Rashtriya Samaj Paksha		2
Samaj Vikas Kranti Party		2
Socialist Unity Centre of India (Communist)		2
Aam Janshakti Party		1
Akhil Bhartiya Sudhar Party		1
Aman Samaj Party		1
Anjaan Aadmi Party		1
Asankhya Samaj Party		1
Atulya Bharat Party		1
Azad Samaj Party		1
Aazad Samaj Party (Kanshi Ram)		1
Bahujan National Party (Ambedkar)		1
Bahujan Shoshit Samaj Sangharsh Samta Party		1
Bhartiya Mahasangh Party		1
Bhartiya Veer Dal		1
Bharat Lok Sewak Party		1
Bharatrashtra Democratic Party		1
Delhi Janta Party		1
Ekam Sanatan Bharat Dal		1
Hamara Sahi Vikalp Party		1
Haryana Jansena Party		1
India Greens Party		1
Jai Hind National Party		1
Log Party		1
Loktantrik Janshakti Party		1
Rashtra Nirman Party		1
Rashtravadi Loktantrik Party (India)		1
Rashtrawadi Janlok Party (Satya)		1
Rashtriya Janmorcha		1
Rashtriya Janshakti Party- Secular		1
Rashtriya Mangalam Party		1
Rashtriya Rashtrawadi Party		1
Rashtriya Suraksha Party		1
Saman Adhikar Party		1
Sarvlokhit Samaj Party		1
Satya Bahumat Party		1
Swaraj Bhartiya Nyay Party		1
Swatantra Jantaraj Party		1
Voters Party International		1
Total		99

== Candidates ==
Constituency		NDA		INDIA	
#	Name	Party	Candidate	Party	Candidate
1	Chandni Chowk	BJP	Praveen Khandelwal	INC	Jai Prakash Agarwal
2	North East Delhi	BJP	Manoj Tiwari	INC	Kanhaiya Kumar
3	East Delhi	BJP	Harsh Malhotra	AAP	Kuldeep Kumar
4	New Delhi	BJP	Bansuri Swaraj	AAP	Somnath Bharti
5	North West Delhi (SC)	BJP	Yogender Chandoliya	INC	Udit Raj
6	West Delhi	BJP	Kamaljeet Sehrawat	AAP	Mahabal Mishra
7	South Delhi	BJP	Ramvir Singh Bidhuri	AAP	Sahi Ram Pehelwan

== Surveys and polls ==
=== Opinion polls ===
Polling agency	Date published	Margin of error				Lead
Polling agency	Date published	Margin of error	NDA	INDIA	Others	Lead
ABP News-CVoter	March 2024	±5%	7	0	0	NDA
India Today-CVoter	February 2024	±3-5%	7	0	0	NDA
Times Now-ETG	December 2023	±3%	6-7	0-1	0	NDA
India TV-CNX	October 2023	±3%	7	0	0	NDA
Times Now-ETG	September 2023	±3%	5-6	1-2	0	NDA
Times Now-ETG	August 2023	±3%	5-6	1-2	0	NDA
India Today-CVoter	August 2023	±3-5%	7	0	0	NDA

Polling agency	Date published	Margin of error				Lead
Polling agency	Date published	Margin of error	NDA	INDIA	Others	Lead
ABP News-CVoter	March 2024	±5%	57%	36%	7%	21
India Today-CVoter	February 2024	±3-5%	57%	40%	3%	17
India Today-CVoter	August 2023	±3-5%	54%	42%	4%	12

=== Exit polls ===
Polling agency				Lead
Polling agency	NDA	INDIA	Others	Lead
India Today-Axis My India	6-7	0-1	0	NDA
TV9 Bharatvarsh- People's Insight - Polstrat	7	0	0	NDA
Pratik- Classification	7	0	0	NDA
Actual results	7	0	0	NDA

== Results ==
=== Results by alliance or party ===
Alliance/ Party		Popular vote			Seats		
Alliance/ Party		Votes	%	±pp	Contested	Won	+/−
NDA	BJP	4,844,180	54.35	▼2.5	7	7	Steady
INDIA	AAP	2,154,001	24.17	▲5.97	4	0	Steady
INDIA	INC	1,685,494	18.91	▼3.72	3	0	Steady
INDIA	Total	3,839,495	43.08	▲2.25	7	0	Steady
Others					99	0	Steady
IND					49	0	Steady
NOTA		45,019	0.51	▼0.02			
Total			100	-	162	7	-

=== Results by constituency ===
Constituency			Winner				Runner Up				Margin	%
#	Name	Poll %	Candidate	Party	Votes	%	Candidate	Party	Votes	%	Margin	%
1	Chandni Chowk	58.69 ▼	Praveen Khandelwal	BJP	516,496	53.46	Jai Prakash Aggarwal	INC	427,171	44.22	89,325	9.24
2	North East Delhi	63.04 ▼	Manoj Tiwari	BJP	824,451	53.10	Kanhaiya Kumar	INC	685,673	44.16	138,778	8.94
3	East Delhi	59.60 ▼	Harsh Malhotra	BJP	664,819	52.59	Kuldeep Kumar	AAP	571,156	45.18	93,663	7.41
4	New Delhi	55.53 ▼	Bansuri Swaraj	BJP	453,185	53.48	Somnath Bharti	AAP	374,815	44.23	78,370	9.25
5	North West Delhi (SC)	58.01 ▼	Yogendra Chandolia	BJP	866,483	58.26	Udit Raj	INC	575,634	38.71	290,849	19.55
6	West Delhi	58.81 ▼	Kamaljeet Sehrawat	BJP	842,658	55.27	Mahabal Mishra	AAP	643,645	42.22	199,013	13.05
7	South Delhi	56.52 ▼	Ramvir Singh Bidhuri	BJP	692,832	53.46	Sahiram Pehalwan	AAP	568,499	43.87	124,333	9.59

== Assembly segments wise lead of Parties ==
2024 Delhi Lok Sabha Elections Assembly Wise Leads Map

Party	Assembly segments	Position in 2025 Assembly Election
Bharatiya Janata Party	52	48
Aam Aadmi Party	10	22
Indian National Congress	8	0
Total	70	

== See also ==
- 2024 Indian general election in Goa
- 2024 Indian general election in Gujarat
- 2024 Indian general election in Haryana
