= 2019 Indian general election in Delhi =

Indian lower house election in Delhi

- 12 May 2019

7 seats
- Turnout: 60.60% (▼4.50%)
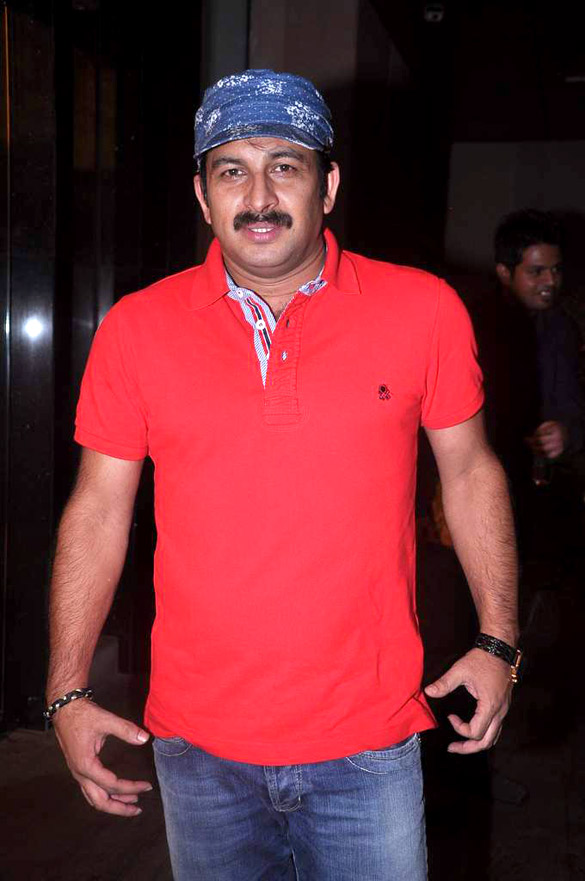

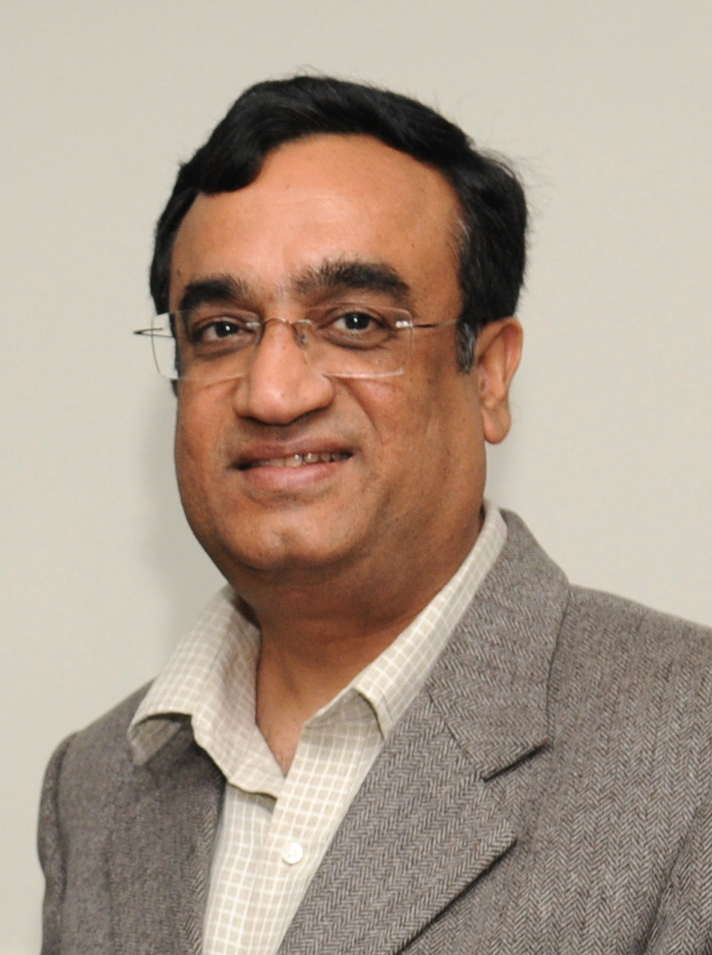

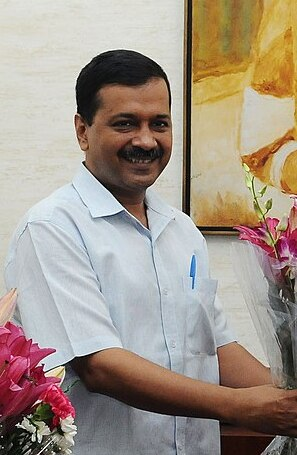
	First party	Second party
Leader	Manoj Tiwari	Ajay Maken
Party	BJP	INC
Alliance	NDA	UPA
Leader's seat	North East Delhi (Won)	New Delhi (lost)
Last election	7	0
Seats won	7	0
Seat change	Steady	Steady
Popular vote	4,908,541	1,953,900
Percentage	56.86%	22.51%
Swing	▲10.46pp	▲7.41pp
	Third party
Leader	Arvind Kejriwal
Party	AAP
Alliance	-
Leader's seat	Did not contest
Last election	0
Seats won	0
Seat change	Steady
Popular vote	1,571,687
Percentage	18.11%
Swing	▼14.79pp
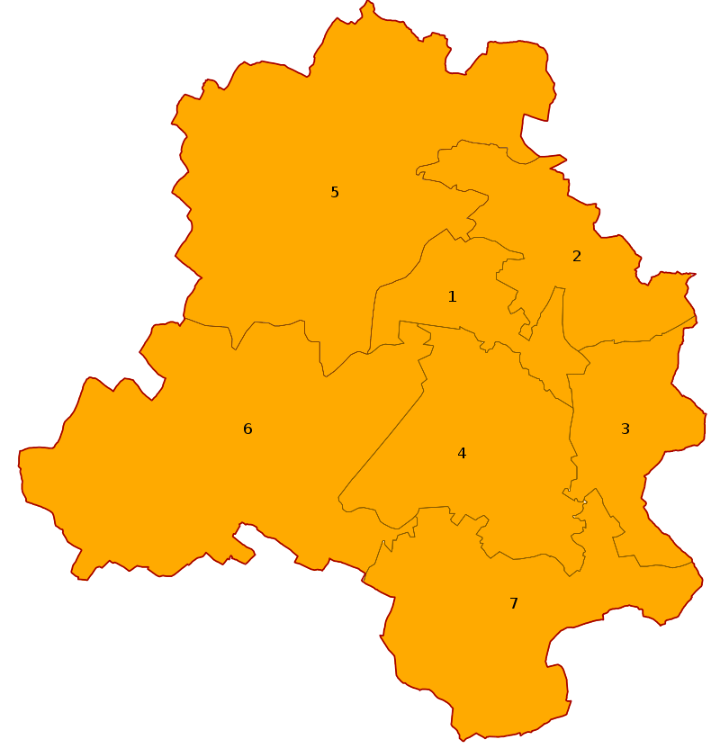
- Delhi
Prime Minister before election
Narendra Modi
BJP
Prime Minister after election
Narendra Modi
BJP

The 2019 Indian general election were held on 12 May 2019. Along with all other states, results in Delhi were declared on 23 May 2019 to constitute the 17th Lok Sabha.Bharatiya Janata Party won all 7 seats, for a second consecutive term.

== Election schedule ==
The election schedule was announced by Election Commission of India (ECI) on 10 March 2019, and with it the Model Code of Conduct came into effect.

Poll event	Phase
Poll event	VI
Notification date	16 April
Last date for filing nomination	23 April
Scrutiny of nomination	24 April
Last Date for withdrawal of nomination	26 April
Date of poll	12 May
Date of counting of votes/Result	23 May 2019
No. of constituencies	7

== Parties and alliances ==
Party Name	Flag	Electoral symbol	Leader	Seats contested
Bharatiya Janata Party			Manoj Tiwari	7
Indian National Congress			Ajay Maken	7
Aam Aadmi Party			Arvind Kejriwal	7

== Candidates ==
Constituency							
Constituency		NDA		AAP		UPA	
1	Chandni Chowk	BJP	Harsh Vardhan	AAP	Pankaj Kumar Gupta	INC	Jai Parkash Aggarwal
2	North East Delhi	BJP	Manoj Tiwari	AAP	Dilip Pandey	INC	Sheila Dikshit
3	East Delhi	BJP	Gautam Gambhir	AAP	Atishi Marlena	INC	Arvinder Singh Lovely
4	New Delhi	BJP	Meenakshi Lekhi	AAP	Brijesh Goyal	INC	Ajay Maken
5	North West Delhi	BJP	Hans Raj	AAP	Gugan Singh	INC	Rajesh Lilothia
6	West Delhi	BJP	Parvesh Verma	AAP	Balbir Singh Jakhar	INC	Mahabal Mishra
7	South Delhi	BJP	Ramesh Bidhuri	AAP	Raghav Chadha	INC	Vijender Singh

== Voter Turnout ==
No.	Constituency	Total Electors	Total Voters	Turnout	Swing
1	Chandni Chowk	15,62,283	9,80,390	62.75%	▼5.12%
2	North East Delhi	22,90,492	14,58,046	63.81%	▼3.51%
3	East Delhi	20,39,302	12,57,821	61.68%	▼3.73%
4	New Delhi	16,17,470	9,20,541	56.91%	▼8.2%
5	North West Delhi	23,78,995	14,02,962	58.97%	▼2.84%
6	West Delhi	23,71,644	14,41,601	60.82%	▼5.31%
7	South Delhi	20,67,463	12,14,222	58.73%	▼4.19%

== Results ==
Vote Share of different parties in the election.
1. BJP (56.9%)
2. INC (22.6%)
3. AAP (18.2%)
4. Other (2.30%)

=== Party wise ===
Party Name	Popular vote			Seats		
Party Name	Votes	%	±pp	Contested	Won	+/−
BJP	4,908,541	56.56	▲10.16	7	7	Steady
INC	1,953,900	22.51	▲7.41	7	0	Steady
AAP	1,571,687	18.11	▼14.79	7	0	Steady
Others	168,466	1.94	Steady	100	0	Steady
IND	30,764	0.35		43	0	Steady
NOTA	45,654	0.53	Steady			
Total	8,679,012	100	-	164	7	-

=== Constituency wise ===
Constituency		Winner				Runner Up				Margin	%
#	Name	Candidate	Party	Votes	%	Candidate	Party	Votes	%	Margin	%
1	Chandni Chowk	Dr. Harsh Vardhan	BJP	519,055	52.92	Jai Prakash Agarwal	INC	290,910	29.66	228,145	23.26
2	North East Delhi	Manoj Tiwari	BJP	787,799	53.86	Sheila Dikshit	INC	421,697	28.83	366,102	25.03
3	East Delhi	Gautam Gambhir	BJP	696,156	55.33	Arvinder Singh Lovely	INC	304,934	24.24	391,222	31.09
4	New Delhi	Meenakshi Lekhi	BJP	504,206	54.77	Ajay Maken	INC	247,702	26.91	256,504	27.86
5	North West Delhi	Hans Raj	BJP	848,663	60.49	Gugan Singh	AAP	294,766	21.01	553,897	39.48
6	West Delhi	Parvesh Verma	BJP	865,648	60.01	Mahabal Mishra	INC	287,162	19.91	578,486	40.10
7	South Delhi	Ramesh Bidhuri	BJP	687,014	56.57	Raghav Chadha	AAP	319,971	26.34	367,043	30.23

== Post-election Union Council of Ministers from Delhi ==
#	Name	Constituency	Designation	Department	From	To	Party
1	Harsh Vardhan	Chandni Chowk	Cabinet Minister	Minister of Health and Family Welfare; Minister of Science and Technology; Minister of Earth Sciences	31 May 2019	7 July 2021	BJP
2	Meenakshi Lekhi	New Delhi	MoS	Ministry of External Affairs; Ministry of Culture	7 July 2021	9 June 2024	BJP

== Assembly segments wise lead of Parties ==
Party	Assembly segments	Position in Assembly (2015)	Position in Assembly (2020)
Bharatiya Janata Party	65	3	8
Indian National Congress	5	0	0
Aam Aadmi Party	0	67	62
Total	70		
