= Kalicharan Sonkar =

Indian politician

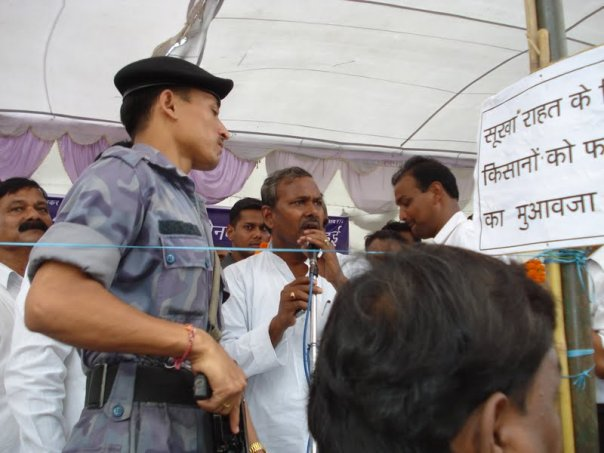

Former Member of Legislative Assembly/State Secretary, Samajwadi Party
- Constituency: Chanbbey, Mirzapur

Former General Secretary, Uttar Pradesh Congress Committee

Former State President, Uttar Pradesh Congress SC/ST Department, President Yuva Janta Dal Uttar Pradesh, National General Secretary Janta Dal.

Personal details
- Born: 7 July 1958 (age 67) Ramnagar, Meja, Allahabad Uttar Pradesh
- Party: Samajwadi Party
- Other political affiliations: Indian National Congress, Indian Justice Party, Janta Dal
- Spouse: Seema Sonkar
- Children: Abhishek Raj, Shikhar Raj Singh
- Education: B.Com LLB, Allahabd University
- Profession: Politician

Kalicharan Sonkar is an Indian politician and activist for the Dalit people who is the Leader of Samajwadi Party. He was a co-founder of the Indian Justice Party with his brother Dr. Udit Raj and was State President that party.

Kalicharan Sonkar is a former Member of the Legislative Assembly from Chanbbey Constituency of Mirzapur, Uttar Pradesh. He joined the Samajwadi Party in April 2014.

== Early life and education ==
He was born to a Khatik (schedule cast) family in Uttar Pradesh.

Sonkar became involved in Dalit politics in Uttar Pradesh, Uttrakhand, Madhya Pradesh and Bihar.
