= Gugan Singh Ranga =

Indian politician

Gugan Singh Ranga (born 7 September 1948) is a leader of Bharatiya Janata Party and a former member of the Delhi Legislative Assembly from Bawana.

He joined the Aam Aadmi Party on 30 July 2017 in presence of Delhi chief minister Arvind Kejriwal. Ranga contested from the North West Delhi parliamentary constituency as an AAP candidate for the 2019 Lok Sabha elections, he lost by 553,897 to Hans Raj Hans.

He returned to BJP on 30 December 2019 in the presence of Union minister Prakash Javadekar and Delhi BJP chief Manoj Tiwari.

== Political career ==
=== 2019 Lok Sabha Election ===
Gugan Singh Ranga contested from the North West Delhi parliamentary constituency as an AAP party candidate for the 2019 Lok Sabha Elections he lost the contest by a margin of around 5,53,897 from Hans Raj Hans.

=== 2013 Delhi Assembly elections ===
Gugan was elected from the reserved assembly constituency of Bawana on a BJP ticket in 2013, but was defeated by AAP's Ved Prakash in the 2015 polls.
