= Kondli Assembly constituency =

Constituency of the Delhi legislative assembly in India

Coordinates: 28.607°N 77.327°E

Kondli
- Constituency No. 56 for the Delhi Legislative Assembly

Constituency details
- Country: India
- Region: North India
- State: Delhi
- District: East Delhi
- Established: 2008
- Reservation: SC

Member of Legislative Assembly
- 8th Delhi Legislative Assembly
- Incumbent Kuldeep Kumar
- Party: AAP
- Elected year: 2025

Kondli is one of the seventy Delhi assembly constituencies of Delhi in northern India. It is a part of East Delhi (Lok Sabha constituency). This constituency was created by reorganisation by delimitation commission in 2008.

== Members of the Legislative Assembly ==
Election	Name	Party
2008	Amrish Singh Gautam	Indian National Congress
2013	Manoj Kumar	Aam Aadmi Party
2015	Manoj Kumar	Aam Aadmi Party
2020	Kuldeep Kumar	Aam Aadmi Party
2025	Kuldeep Kumar	Aam Aadmi Party

== Election results ==
=== 2025 ===
Delhi Assembly elections, 2025: Kondli
Party	Candidate	Votes	%	±%
AAP	Kuldeep Kumar	61,792		
BJP	Priyanka Gautam	55,499		
INC	Akshay Kumar			
ASP(KR)	Siddharth Priy Ashok			
BSP	Mukesh Kumar			
NOTA	None of the above			
Majority				
Turnout				
		Swing		

=== 2020 ===
Delhi Assembly elections, 2020: Kondli
Party	Candidate	Votes	%	±%
AAP	Kuldeep Kumar	68,348	53.11	+2.48
BJP	Raj Kumar	50,441	39.20	+8.41
INC	Amrish Singh Gautam	5,861	4.55	−6.31
BSP	Karmvir	2,714	2.11	−4.72
NOTA	None of the above	557	0.43	+0.07
Majority		17,907	13.96	−5.88
Turnout		1,28,810	67.30	−2.87
AAP hold		Swing	+2.48	

=== 2015 ===
Delhi Assembly elections, 2015: Kondli
Party	Candidate	Votes	%	±%
AAP	Manoj Kumar	63,185	50.63	+16.4
BJP	Hukam Singh	38,426	30.79	+3.57
INC	Amrish Singh Gautam	13,562	10.86	−12.06
BSP	Chaman Kumar	8,533	6.83	−7.06
NOTA	None of the above	458	0.36	−0.24
Majority		24,759	19.84	+12.90
Turnout		1,24,763	70.17	
AAP hold		Swing	+16.46	

=== 2013 ===
Delhi Assembly elections, 2013: Kondli
Party	Candidate	Votes	%	±%
AAP	Manoj Kumar	36,863	34.17	
BJP	Dushyant Kumar Gautam	29,373	27.22	+0.50
INC	Amrish Singh Gautam	24,730	22.92	−22.34
BSP	Chaman Kumar	14,988	13.89	−10.74
NOTA	None of the Above	647	0.60	
Majority		7,490	6.94	−11.60
Turnout		107,939	67.75	
AAP gain from INC		Swing		

=== 2008 ===
Delhi Assembly elections, 2008: Kondli
Party	Candidate	Votes	%	±%
INC	Amrish Singh Gautam	36,580	45.26	
BJP	Dushyant Kumar Gautam	21,594	26.72	
BSP	Chander Pal Singh	19,903	24.63	
Independent	Shiv Dutt	916	1.13	
LJP	Madan Pal Singh	475	0.59	
Independent	Rajan	311	0.38	
JKNPP	Kanta	268	0.33	
Independent	Vijay Kumar	224	0.28	
IJP	Madan Lal	149	0.18	
Independent	Narender Kumar	143	0.18	
Independent	Parveen Kumar Kaim	136	0.17	
RPI(A)	Rajender Kumar	117	0.14	
Majority		14,986	18.54	
Turnout		80,816	59.6	
INC win (new seat)				
