= Lal Bihari Tiwari =

Indian politician

Member of Parliament, Lok Sabha
- In office 1997–2004
- Preceded by: Baikunth Lal Sharma
- Succeeded by: Sandeep Dikshit
- Constituency: East Delhi

Minister of Food & Supplies Government of Delhi
- In office December 1993 – June 1997
- Chief Minister: Madan Lal Khurana

Member of Delhi Legislative Assembly
- In office 1993–1997
- Preceded by: Constituency created
- Succeeded by: Bheeshma Sharma
- Constituency: Ghonda

Personal details
- Born: 30 November 1941 (age 84) Salembhadari, Pratapgarh district, United Provinces, British India
- Party: Bharatiya Janata Party
- Spouse: Bindeshwari Devi
- Children: 6 sons, 2 daughters
- Parent: Laxmi Kant Tiwari (father)
- Education: High School
- Profession: Agriculturist, Politician

Lal Bihari Tiwari (born 30 November 1941) is an Indian politician from Delhi. He was a member of Bharatiya Janata Party.

== Positions held ==
- General Secretary, Mandal Ghonda, Bharatiya Jan Sangh President, Mandal Ghonda, Jan Sangh
- Mantri Vice-President and President, BJP, District Shahdara
- 1993-June 1997: Member, Delhi Legislative Assembly
- December 1993 – June 1997: Minister, Food and Supply, Government of Delhi
- 1997: Elected to Lok Sabha in a by-poll (Eleventh)
- 1998: Elected to 12th Lok Sabha (2nd term)
- 1999: Elected to 13th Lok Sabha (3rd term)
