= H. K. L. Bhagat =

Indian politician (1921–2005)

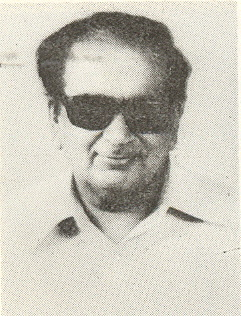

Union Minister of Housing and Urban Affairs
- In office December 1975 – March 1977

Union Minister of Information and Broadcasting
- In office February 1983 – December 1984

Union Minister of Parliamentary Affairs
- In office 31 December 1984 – 2 December 1989

Personal details
- Born: 4 April 1921 Sahiwal, Punjab, British India
- Died: 21 October 2005 (aged 84) New Delhi, Delhi, India
- Party: Indian National Congress
- Nickname(s): Kingmaker, Uncrowned King of Delhi

Hari Krishan Lal Bhagat (4 April 1921 – 29 October 2005) was an Indian politician of the Congress party. He served as the Deputy Mayor and Mayor of Delhi, the Chief Whip of Delhi Pradesh Congress Committee (DPCC), and as a six-time MP and Union minister for 22 years. Hailed as the “Uncrowned King Of Delhi" and "Kingmaker", Bhagat was commonly known for being a successful loyalist to Indira Gandhi and maintained unparalleled influence in Delhi and the Congress Party throughout the 1970s and 80s. During his time as a politician, Bhagat reigned massive influence in Delhi, and it's often alleged that no Delhi politician could start their careers without the approval of Bhagat, thus giving him the name "Kingmaker". Bhagat's career reached its peak in the 1984 election, in which his victory for the East Delhi seat was second largest out of all 543 victories in the entire country. Throughout his career in politics, Bhagat held several different ministerial roles. Bhagat's career declined in the early 1990s after he was named in several commissions investigating the role of Congress politicians during the 1984 anti-Sikh riots. His role in the anti-Sikh pogrom of 1984 and his name appears in the list of "officials accused of leading mobs and inciting mobsters to kill Sikhs that can be read in most of the affidavits filed by victims and survivors". His alleged role in the riots is controversial, though he was cleared by the government in two trials in the 1990s and early 2000s.

== Career ==
Born in West Punjab, British India (now Pakistan), Bhagat moved to Delhi in 1947 following partition and quickly became active in the politics of the area. A strong Indira Gandhi loyalist, and strong leader in Delhi in the 1970s and 1980s, Bhagat won six consecutive elections by large margins, and was responsible for a Congress comeback in the 1980 and 1983 elections in Delhi. He was known to have a strong group in the Congress Party, and won his first Lok Sabha election in 1971 from the East Delhi constituency in Delhi. He grew in political stature after Congress victories in the local elections of 1983 which led him to be known as the ‘Uncrowned King of Delhi’ for many years. He held ministerial positions in Information and Broadcasting, Parliamentary Affairs and Law, and produced the state-run TV "Doordarshan", the Congress party's mouthpiece during the mid to late 1980s.

Bhagat's career declined after losing from East Delhi in 1991. Towards the end of his political career, he was named by the Nanavati Commission for an alleged involvement in the 1984 Anti-Sikh Riots. The commission did not recommend any action against Bhagat when it was published in 2005, due to his acquittal in other court cases and his poor health at the time. Based on the recommendation of the Nanavati Commission, the government ultimately declined to prosecute Bhagat because of his poor health by that time and in which he died 8 months later. According to the Nanavati Commission, Bhagat and Lieutenant Governor of Delhi, P.G. Gavai, visited areas affected by violence for about 2 1/2 hours on 2 November 1984. During the riots, a local councilor in Delhi and 5 other persons visited the residence of Bhagat, raising their concerns of the violence. Bhagat allegedly told them he was making efforts to provide compensation to victims of the riots in Trilokpuri and asked for affidavits by them to declare him innocent along with other Congress leaders. He was acquitted by the courts in both cases citing lack of evidence as many witnesses including his security personnel testifying that Bhagat was next to late PM Indira Gandhi's body for 3 days and did not leave her premises. The then Lieutenant Governor of Delhi also testified to Nanavati commission that HKL Bhagat called him multiple times asking for the Army to be brought in.

Bhagat's alleged role in the riots made him a target for Sikh Militants, and was on a hit list of Sikh assassins Sukhdev Singh Sukha and Harjinder Singh Jinda.

In the 1984 election, Bhagat won the East Delhi district once again, this time with 73% of the vote: the second largest victory in the country. Another victory was scored by him in 1989, but the emergence of numerous local and national political parties had resulted in Bhagat and the Congress vote being wrested by other parties, decreasing his vote share. He ran for a final time in 1991, but the fallout of reports over his actions in the 1984 riots, as well as a general decline of the Congress party post-Gandhi had seen Bhagat defeated, after 11 years of direct rule, and 17 non-continuous years of power as an MP for East Delhi alone.

Bhagat began to suffer from a decline in health following his leave from Congress in 1997. Bhagat died in a hospital after prolonged illness and he was suffering from Alzheimer's disease. He is survived by his son, DPCC gen secretary Deepak Bhagat.

== Electoral history ==
=== 10th Lok Sabha: 1991 General Elections ===
1991 Indian general election: East Delhi
Party	Candidate	Votes	%	±%
BJP	B. L. Sharma (Prem)	303,141	40.27	
INC	H. K. L. Bhagat	241,316	32.05	−17.74
JD	Ram Bir Singh Bidhuri	158,712	21.08	+15.83
Majority		61,825	8.22	−16.15
Turnout		752,846	48.23	−1.40
BJP gain from INC		Swing		

=== 9th Lok Sabha: 1989 General Elections ===
1989 Indian general election: East Delhi
Party	Candidate	Votes	%	±%
INC	H K L Bhagat	359,602	49.79	−27.16
Independent	Chand Ram	183,603	25.42	
BSP	Kanshi Ram	81,095	11.23	
JD	Kishor Lal	37,925	5.25	
Majority		175,999	24.37	−37.84
Turnout		722,183	49.63	−11.72
INC hold		Swing	-27.16	

=== 8th Lok Sabha: 1984 General Elections ===
1984 Indian general election: East Delhi
Party	Candidate	Votes	%	±%
INC	H K L Bhagat	386,150	76.95	+21.95
JP	Kishore Lal	73,970	14.74	−19.17
Majority		312,180	62.21	+41.12
Turnout		501,822	61.35	−1.01
INC hold		Swing	+21.95	

=== 7th Lok Sabha: 1980 General Elections ===
1980 Indian general election: East Delhi
Party	Candidate	Votes	%	±%
INC(I)	H K L Bhagat	228,727	55.00	+24.64
JP	Kishore Lal	141,019	33.91	−34.04
JP(S)	Mir Singh	25,539	6.14	
Majority		87,708	21.09	−16.50
Turnout		415,881	62.36	−7.77
INC(I) gain from BLD		Swing	+24.64	

=== 6th Lok Sabha: 1977 General Elections ===
1977 Indian general election: East Delhi
Party	Candidate	Votes	%	±%
JP	Kishore Lal	240,594	67.95	
INC	H K L Bhagat	107,487	30.36	−33.76
RPI	Radhey Shyam	3,748	1.06	
Majority		133,107	37.59	+5.12
Turnout		354,078	70.13	+5.31
JP gain from INC		Swing		

=== 5th Lok Sabha: 1971 General Elections ===
1971 Indian general election: East Delhi
Party	Candidate	Votes	%	±%
INC	H K L Bhagat	146,632	64.12	+18.65
ABJS	Hardayal Devgun	72,382	31.65	−17.11
INC(O)	Fateh Singh	5,717	2.50	
Majority		74,250	32.47	+29.18
Turnout		228,685	64.82	−2.47
INC gain from ABJS		Swing	+18.65	
