= Geeta Colony Assembly constituency =

Constituency of the Delhi legislative assembly in India

Coordinates: 28.651°N 77.271°E

Geeta Colony
- Former constituency for the Delhi Legislative Assembly

Constituency details
- Country: India
- Region: North India
- State: Delhi
- Established: 1967
- Abolished: 2008
- Reservation: None

Geeta Colony was a Delhi Legislative Assembly constituency of the East Delhi (Lok Sabha constituency), New Delhi, India from 1967 to 2008.

== Formation ==
The constituency was created pursuant to "Delimitation Order, 1967". Its first election was held in 1972 and it was assigned identification number 25.The history behind the name taken from BHAGVAT GEETA which have 18 chapters so Geeta Colony have total 18 blocks accordingly.

== Extinguishment ==
The constituency ceased to exist in 2008 after the "Delimitation of Parliamentary and Assembly Constituencies Order, 2008" was passed.

== Area covered ==
The Geeta Colony Assembly constituency was delineated by a line starting from the junction of Gandhi Nagar Road with Yamuna and running eastwards along Gandhi Nagar Road up to its junction with the eastern boundary of Krishna Nagar, thence along the eastern and southern boundary of Krishna Nagar and along the southern boundary of Geeta Colony up to the Canal Bund; thence westwards along the Canal Bund up to Yamuna; thence north-westwards along Yamuna back to the starting point.

== Members of the Legislative Assembly ==
Year	Name	Party
1972	Brij Lal Goswami	Indian National Congress
1993	Ashok Kumar Walia	Indian National Congress
1998	Ashok Kumar Walia	Indian National Congress
2003	Ashok Kumar Walia	Indian National Congress

== See also ==
- East Delhi (Lok Sabha constituency)
- New Delhi
