= Trilokpuri Assembly constituency =

Constituency of the Delhi legislative assembly in India

Coordinates: 28.602°N 77.303°E

Trilokpuri
- Constituency No. 55 for the Delhi Legislative Assembly

Constituency details
- Country: India
- Region: North India
- State: Delhi
- District: East Delhi
- Established: 1993
- Reservation: SC

Member of Legislative Assembly
- 8th Delhi Legislative Assembly
- Incumbent Ravi Kant Ujjain
- Party: BJP
- Elected year: 2025

Trilokpuri is one of the seventy Delhi Legislative Assembly constituencies of Delhi in northern India. It is a part of the East Delhi Lok Sabha constituency. Trilokpuri is a resettlement colony of residents which were rehabilitated here when nearby slums were cleared out in 1975–76.

== Members of the Legislative Assembly ==
Election	Member	Party
1993	Brahm Pal	Indian National Congress
1998	Brahm Pal	Indian National Congress
2003	Brahm Pal	Indian National Congress
2008	Sunil Kumar Vaidya	Bharatiya Janata Party
2013	Raju Dhingan	Aam Aadmi Party
2015	Raju Dhingan	Aam Aadmi Party
2020	Rohit Kumar Mehraulia	Aam Aadmi Party
2025	Ravikant Ujjain	Bharatiya Janata Party

== Election results ==
=== 2025 ===
Delhi Assembly elections, 2025: Trilokpuri
Party	Candidate	Votes	%	±%
BJP	Ravikant Ujjain	58,217	46.01	▲3.00
AAP	Anjana Parcha	57,825	45.79	▼6.57
INC	Amardeep	6,147	4.87	▲2.43
ASP(KR)	Vicky Paracha	1,681	1.33	New
NOTA	None of the above			
Majority				
Turnout				
		Swing		

=== 2020 ===
Delhi Assembly elections, 2020: Trilokpuri
Party	Candidate	Votes	%	±%
AAP	Rohit Kumar Mehraulia	69,947	52.36	−6.26
BJP	Kiran Vaidya	57,461	43.01	+7.68
INC	Vijay Kumar	3,262	2.44	−0.80
BSP	Raghu Raj Singh	1,224	0.92	−0.81
NOTA	None of the above	590	0.44	+0.08
Majority		12,486	9.38	−13.91
Turnout		1,33,694	66.67	−5.04
AAP hold		Swing	-6.26	

=== 2015 ===
Delhi Assembly elections, 2015: Trilokpuri
Party	Candidate	Votes	%	±%
AAP	Raju Dhingan	74,907	58.62	+19.69
BJP	Kiran Vaidya	45,153	35.33	+12.02
INC	Brahm Pal	4,149	3.24	−14.22
BSP	Dr. Girish	2,217	1.73	−12.49
NOTA	None of the above	467	0.36	−0.23
Majority		29,754	23.29	+7.67
Turnout		1,27,802	71.71	
AAP hold		Swing	+19.69	

=== 2013 ===
Delhi Assembly elections, 2013: Trilokpuri
Party	Candidate	Votes	%	±%
AAP	Raju Dhingan	44,082	38.93	
BJP	Sunil Kumar Vaidya	26,397	23.31	−13.97
INC	Harnam Singh	19,774	17.46	−19.05
BSP	Vijay Pal	16,099	14.22	−9.30
Independent	Jagdeesh Prasad	4,175	3.69	
JD(U)	Pritam	640	0.57	
CPI	Khubi Ram	476	0.42	
Independent	Subhash Chand	212	0.19	
Hindustan Janta Party	Bittoo Singh	200	0.18	
IPP	Satpal Singh	197	0.17	
Independent	Ajay	175	0.15	−0.38
Independent	Padam Chand	152	0.13	
NOTA	None	666	0.59	
Majority		17,685	15.62	+14.85
Turnout		113,279	69.10	
AAP gain from BJP		Swing		

=== 2008 ===
Delhi Assembly elections, 2008: Trilokpuri
Party	Candidate	Votes	%	±%
BJP	Sunil Kumar Vaidya	30,781	37.28	+6.81
INC	Anjana	30,147	36.51	−3.31
BSP	Ganga Ram	19,417	23.52	+2.55
RPI(A)	Lovekush Sagar	665	0.81	
Independent	Ajay	435	0.53	
Independent	Prem Chand	393	0.48	
Independent	Charan Dass	390	0.47	
Independent	Fateh Singh	334	0.40	
Majority		634	0.77	−8.58
Turnout		82,562	59.9	+7.37
BJP gain from INC		Swing	+5.16	

=== 2003 ===
Delhi Assembly elections, 2003: Trilokpuri
Party	Candidate	Votes	%	±%
INC	Brahm Pal	26,469	39.82	−3.97
BJP	Sunil Kumar Vaidya	20,254	30.47	−4.19
BSP	Ganga Ram	13,938	20.97	+2.95
LJP	A Vijay Pal	2,307	3.47	
JD(U)	Pritam	951	1.43	
SP	Kalicharan	810	1.22	+1.02
IJP	Bankey Lal	519	0.78	
RSMD	Vir Prakash	463	0.70	
NLP	Ramesh Pal	431	0.65	
NCP	Suresh Kumar Sood	328	0.49	
Majority		6,215	9.35	+0.22
Turnout		66,470	52.23	+3.62
INC hold		Swing	-3.97	

=== 1998 ===
Delhi Assembly elections, 1998: Trilokpuri
Party	Candidate	Votes	%	±%
INC	Brahm Pal	22,887	43.79	+6.53
BJP	Ram Charan (Gujrati)	18,116	34.66	+3.36
BSP	Ganga Ram Bairwa	9,419	18.02	+9.24
Independent	Ramji Lal s/o Budh Ram	448	0.86	
JD	Kamal Kishore	335	0.64	−20.43
Independent	Budh Ram	254	0.49	
Independent	Virender Kumar	193	0.37	
Independent	Rajender Kumar	114	0.22	
Independent	Dharam Veer Jatav	113	0.22	
RPI	Prakash Chand	111	0.21	
SP	Om Prakash	103	0.20	
SJP(R)	Anit	71	0.14	
Independent	Kailash Chand Sood	55	0.11	
Independent	Ramji Lal s/o Balu Ram	48	0.09	
Majority		4,771	9.13	+3.17
Turnout		52,267	48.61	+8.87
INC hold		Swing	+6.53	

=== 1993 ===
Delhi Assembly elections, 1993: Trilokpuri
Party	Candidate	Votes	%	±%
INC	Brahm Pal	17,844	37.26	
BJP	Ram Charan Gujrati	14,989	31.30	
JD	Mange Ram	10,088	21.07	
BSP	Hari Das	4,203	8.78	
BKD	Kanwar Pal s/o Dharme	163	0.34	
BAD	Kanwar Pal s/o Masahi Charan	138	0.29	
Independent	Jeevan Kumar	117	0.24	
BKD(J)	Prakash Chand Bahot	116	0.24	
Doordarshi Party	Ram Bali	102	0.21	
Independent	Raj Kumar Kureel	91	0.19	
Independent	Ram Kumar	36	0.08	
Majority		2,855	5.96	
Turnout		47,887	57.48	
INC hold		Swing		
