= Raju Dhingan =

Indian politician

Delhi Legislative Assembly
- Preceded by: Sunil Kumar
- Succeeded by: Rohit Kumar Mehraulia
- Constituency: Trilokpuri

Personal details
- Born: Delhi
- Party: Bharatiya Janata Party
- Other political affiliations: Aam Aadmi Party

Raju Dhingan is an Indian politician from the Bharatiya Janata Party, represented Trilokpuri constituency in the Delhi State Legislature.

== Political career ==
Dhingan was employed with Central Industrial Security Force before entering politics. He also provides free training to youth in body building. Originally elected to represent Trilokpuri in 2013, Dhingan was reelected in 2015.

On 10 January 2017, sanitation workers dumped garbage in front of Dhingan's home as part of a strike to protest against government negligence.

He Joined Bharatiya Janata Party in 2022.
