= Amrish Singh Gautam =

Indian politician

Member of Legislative Assembly for Kondli
- In office 1998–2013
- Preceded by: Manoj Kumar

Personal details
- Born: 8 July 1956 (age 70)
- Party: Indian National Congress (1998-2020), (2020-present) Bharatiya Janata party (2020)

Amrish Singh Gautam (born 8 July 1956) is an Indian politician and is member of the Second, Third and Fourth Legislative Assembly of Delhi. He is a member of the Indian National Congress and represents Kondli (Assembly constituency) of Delhi. He served as the Deputy Speaker in Fourth Legislative Assembly of Delhi.
