= Maheish Girri =

Indian social activist and politician

Member of the India Parliament
- In office 16 May 2014 – 23 May 2019
- Preceded by: Sandeep Dikshit
- Succeeded by: Gautam Gambhir
- Constituency: East Delhi

Personal details
- Born: 8 February 1974 (age 52) Nashik, Maharashtra, India
- Citizenship: Indian
- Party: Bharatiya Janata Party (2014-2019)
- Website: maheishgirri.com

Maheish Girri is an Indian social activist and politician belonging to the Bharatiya Janata Party (BJP. He was a member of parliament from the East Delhi Lok Sabha constituency.

Girri is an Art of Living faculty and a former International Director of the Art of Living Foundation. He is also the founder of the NGO Navbharat Sewa Samiti. He quit the India Against Corruption movement over differences with Arvind Kejriwal, and subsequently joined BJP, winning the 2014 General Elections from East Delhi.

== Early life ==
Maheish Girri was born and brought up in Nashik. According to him, he left his home at the age of 17, after being drawn to spirituality. In 1999, he became a Peethadeesh (head of a peeth) in Junagadh, Gujarat. Subsequently, he met Sri Sri Ravi Shankar, and became an Art of Living teacher.

== Social activism ==
In 2009, he launched the Mantranaad movement aimed at creating a "Corruption free, Terrorism free India". In 2010, as an Art of Living leader, he launched the organization's Meri Delhi, Meri Yamuna ("My Delhi, My Yamuna") campaign to clean up the Yamuna river. In 2010, he led the "Clean Delhi" movement ahead of the Commonwealth Games. He has also helped organize over 108 medical camps and 151 free eye-and-ear check-up camps across slums of East Delhi.

== Politics ==
In 2011, Girri joined India Against Corruption movement, but quit it after complaining about Arvind Kejriwals "autocratic ways". Subsequently, he joined the Bharatiya Janata Party (BJP). He was National Secretary of Bharatiya Janata Party (BJP) 2014 to 2020. He was a Member of Parliament for the Bhartiya Janata Party in 16th Lok Sabha from the East Delhi constituency.
