= Sandeep Dikshit =

Indian politician (born 1964)

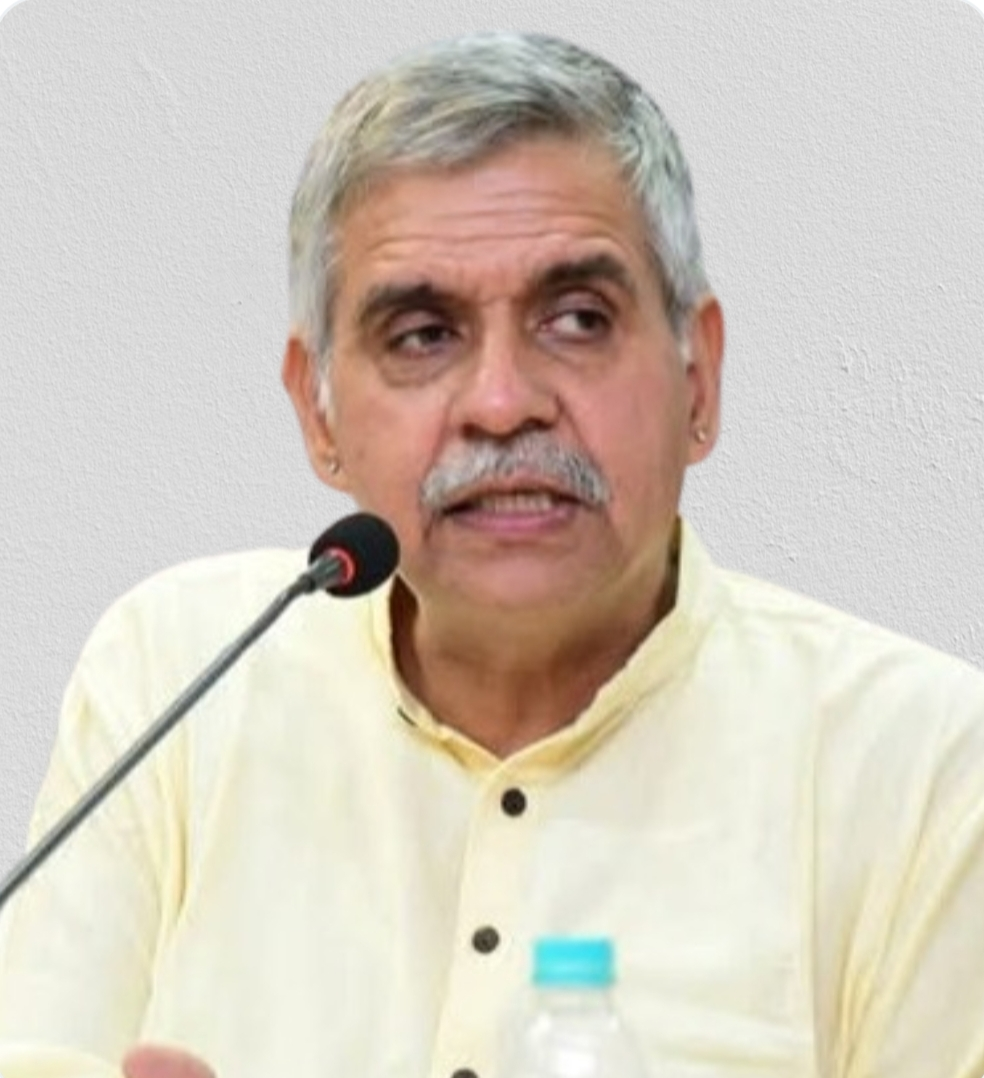
- Dikshit in 2014

Member of Parliament, Lok Sabha
- In office May 2004 – May 2014
- Preceded by: Lal Bihari Tiwari
- Succeeded by: Maheish Girri
- Constituency: East Delhi, Delhi

Personal details
- Born: 15 August 1964 (age 62) Lucknow, Uttar Pradesh, India
- Party: Indian National Congress
- Spouse: Mona Dikshit (m. 1992)
- Children: 1
- Parent: Sheila Dikshit (mother)
- As of 16 September, 2006 Source: [Loksabha profile, Parliament of India]

Sandeep Dikshit (born 15 August 1964) is an Indian politician, development manager and educator. He is the son of former Chief Minister of Delhi, Sheila Dikshit. He was a member of the 15th Lok Sabha of India. He represented the East Delhi constituency of Delhi and is a member of the Indian National Congress (INC) political party.

== Early life ==
Sandeep Dikshit was born in Lucknow to former Delhi Chief Minister Sheila Dikshit and Vinod Dikshit, an IAS officer from the Uttar Pradesh cadre, he also has a sister named Latika Dikshit. Sandeep is also the grandson of former West Bengal Governor Uma Shankar Dikshit.

Sandeep holds a master's degree in history from St. Stephens College, and received his post-graduate diploma in Rural Management in 1989 at the Institute of Rural Management, Anand (IRMA).

== Career ==
Before entering active politics, Sandeep Dikshit headed a social development group Sanket Information and Research Agency Pvt. Ltd which pioneered the first sub-national Human Development Report in the world in 1996. He also served as a faculty member at O. P. Jindal Global University, Sonipat.

During his tenure as Member of Parliament, Lok Sabha Dikshit has been part of parliamentary committees ranging from Public Accounts Committee, Rural Development & Panchayati Raj and House Rules Committee. He was the Chief Whip of the Congress party between 2012-2014 and also served as a national spokesperson of the party in the past.

In June 2019, he triggered a controversy when he likened behavior by the Indian Chief of the Army Staff General Bipin Rawat to that of a "goon on the street" and apologized later via Twitter.

In 2025 Sandeep Dikshit was appointed the National Chairperson of Rachnatmak Congress (formerly known as Congress Outreach Cell) a dedicated platform for egagement with civil society groups, academia, activists, issue based collectives and larger civil movements for reform and progressive broad tent politics. He has raised concerns on the renaming and replacement of the MGREGA rural remployment guarantee scheme by the government.

== Personal life ==
He is married to Mona Dikshit. They have a daughter.

Lok Sabha
Preceded by Lal Bihari Tiwari	Member of Parliament for East Delhi; 2004–2014	Succeeded by Maheish Girri
