= East Delhi Lok Sabha constituency =

Lok Sabha Constituency in Delhi

Coordinates: 28.6420°N 77.2980°E

East Delhi DL-3
- Lok Sabha constituency
- Interactive Map Outlining East Delhi Lok Sabha constituency

Constituency details
- Country: India
- Region: North India
- Union Territory: Delhi
- Assembly constituencies: Jangpura; Okhla; Trilokpuri; Kondli; Patparganj; Laxmi Nagar; Vishwas Nagar; Krishna Nagar; Gandhi Nagar; Shahdara
- Established: 1967
- Reservation: None

Member of Parliament
- 18th Lok Sabha
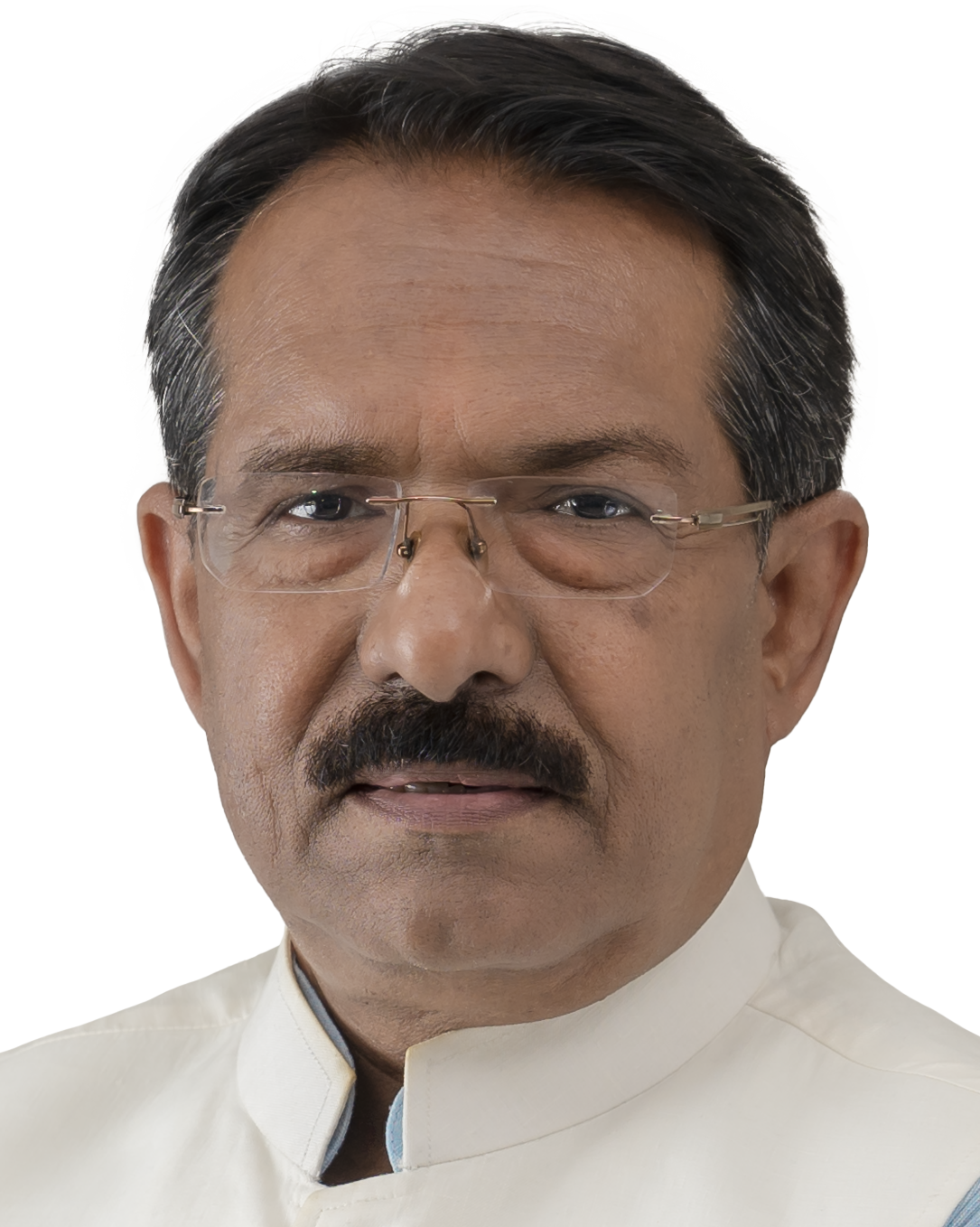
- Incumbent Harsh Malhotra
- Party: BJP
- Alliance: NDA
- Elected year: 2024

Political map of Delhi showing parliamentary constituencies as of 2024 elections.

East Delhi Lok Sabha constituency is one of the 7 Lok Sabha (parliamentary) constituencies in the Indian National Capital Territory of Delhi. This constituency came into existence in 1966. It presently comprises 40 municipal wards of the Municipal Corporation of Delhi with approximately 16 lakh voters and a population of approx 25 lakhs.

East Delhi is one of the larger and highly populated Lok Sabha constituencies not only in Delhi but all over India. The constituency covers areas of East Delhi and some areas of South East Delhi and has a large population, including Okhla, Seelampur, Shahdara, Gandhi Nagar and Preet Vihar. The current MP from here is Harsh Malhotra

== Assembly segments ==
Following the delimitation of the parliamentary constituencies, since 2008, it comprises the following Delhi Vidhan Sabha segments:

#	Name	District	Member	Party	Leading (in 2024)
41	Jangpura	South East Delhi	Tarvinder Singh Marwah	BJP	AAP
54	Okhla	South East Delhi	Amanatullah Khan	AAP	AAP
55	Trilokpuri (SC)	East Delhi	Ravikant Ujjain	BJP	BJP
56	Kondli (SC)	East Delhi	Kuldeep Kumar	AAP	BJP
57	Patparganj	East Delhi	Ravinder Singh Negi	BJP	BJP
58	Laxmi Nagar	East Delhi	Abhay Verma	BJP	BJP
59	Vishwas Nagar	Shahdara	Om Prakash Sharma	BJP	BJP
60	Krishna Nagar	East Delhi	Anil Goyal	BJP	BJP
61	Gandhi Nagar	East Delhi	Arvinder Singh Lovely	BJP	BJP
62	Shahdara	Shahdara	Sanjay Goyal	BJP	BJP

From 1993 to 2008, it comprised the following Delhi Vidhan Sabha segments: Trilokpuri, Patparganj, Mandawali, Geeta Colony, Gandhi Nagar, Krishna Nagar, Vishwas Nagar, Shahdara, Seemapuri, Nand Nagari, Rohtas Nagar, Babarpur, Seelampur, Ghonda, Yamuna Vihar, Qarawal Nagar, Wazirpur, Nerela (Polling stations 1-64 and 70-97), Bhalswa Jahangirpur (Polling stations 3-163), Adarsh Nagar, Timarpur (Polling stations 46, 97-101) and Model Town (Polling stations 103-113)

From 1966 to 1993, the constituency comprised the following Delhi Metropolitan Council segments: Wazirabad, Narela, Gita Colony, Gandhi Nagar, Krishan Nagar, Shahdara, Rohtas Nagar and Ghonda

== Members of Parliament ==
The East Delhi Lok Sabha constituency was created in 1967. The list of Member of Parliament (MP) is as follows:

Year	Member	Party
1967	Hardayal Devgun	Bharatiya Jana Sangh
1971	H. K. L. Bhagat	Indian National Congress
1977	Kishore Lal	Janata Party
1980	H. K. L. Bhagat	Indian National Congress (I)
1984	H. K. L. Bhagat	Indian National Congress
1989	H. K. L. Bhagat	Indian National Congress
1991	Baikunth Lal Sharma	Bharatiya Janata Party
1996	Baikunth Lal Sharma	Bharatiya Janata Party
1997^	Lal Bihari Tiwari	Bharatiya Janata Party
1998	Lal Bihari Tiwari	Bharatiya Janata Party
1999	Lal Bihari Tiwari	Bharatiya Janata Party
2004	Sandeep Dikshit	Indian National Congress
2009	Sandeep Dikshit	Indian National Congress
2014	Maheish Girri	Bharatiya Janata Party
2019	Gautam Gambhir	Bharatiya Janata Party
2024	Harsh Malhotra	Bharatiya Janata Party

^By-Poll

== Election results ==
=== 2024 ===
2024 Indian general elections: East Delhi
Party	Candidate	Votes	%	±%
BJP	Harsh Malhotra	664,819	52.59	▼2.76
AAP	Kuldeep Kumar	5,71,156	45.18	▲27.74
NOTA	None of the Above	5,394	0.43	▲0.04
Majority		93,663	7.41	▼23.7
Turnout		12,64,411	59.60	
BJP hold		Swing	▼2.76	

=== 2019 ===
2019 Indian general elections: East Delhi
Party	Candidate	Votes	%	±%
BJP	Gautam Gambhir	696,356	55.35	+7.52
INC	Arvinder Singh Lovely	3,04,934	24.24	+7.25
AAP	Atishi Marlena	2,19,328	17.44	−14.47
NOTA	None of the Above	4,920	0.39	−0.03
Majority		3,91,222	31.11	+15.19
Turnout		12,58,195	61.70	−3.69
BJP hold		Swing	+7.52	

=== 16th Lok Sabha: 2014 General Elections ===
2014 Indian general elections: East Delhi
Party	Candidate	Votes	%	±%
BJP	Dr. Maheish Girri	572,202	47.83	+15.53
AAP	Rajmohan Gandhi	3,81,739	31.91	New
INC	Sandeep Dikshit	2,03,240	16.99	−43.42
NOTA	None of the Above	4,975	0.42	N/A
Majority		1,90,463	15.92	−12.19
Turnout		11,96,336	65.39	+11.96
BJP gain from INC		Swing	+15.53	

=== 15th Lok Sabha: 2009 General Elections ===
2009 Indian general election: East Delhi
Party	Candidate	Votes	%	±%
INC	Sandeep Dikshit	5,18,001	60.41	+4.19
BJP	Chetan Chauhan	2,76,948	32.30	−4.63
BSP	Mohammad Yunus	45,447	5.30	+1.02
IND.	Vikram Seth	3,556	0.41	
LKD	Abdul Gaffar	3,157	0.37	
Majority		2,41,053	28.11	+8.81
Turnout		8,57,406	53.43	
INC hold		Swing	+1.88	

=== 14th Lok Sabha: 2004 General Elections ===
2004 Indian general election: East Delhi
Party	Candidate	Votes	%	±%
INC	Sandeep Dikshit	6,69,527	56.22	+13.97
BJP	Lal Bihari Tiwari	4,39,748	36.93	−13.29
BSP	Bal Raj SIngh	50,985	4.28	+0.67
Majority		2,29,779	19.30	+11.37
Turnout		11,90,814		
INC gain from BJP		Swing	+7.33	

=== 13th Lok Sabha: 1999 General Elections ===
1999 Indian general election: East Delhi
Party	Candidate	Votes	%	±%
BJP	Lal Bihari Tiwari	5,21,434	50.22	+1.39
INC	AVM H L Kapur	4,38,674	42.25	−2.64
BSP	Javed Ansari	37,444	3.61	+0.56
Majority		82,760	7.93	+3.99
Turnout		10,38,275	43.37	−8.07
BJP hold		Swing	+0.07	

=== 12th Lok Sabha: 1998 General Elections ===
1998 Indian general election: East Delhi
Party	Candidate	Votes	%	±%
BJP	Lal Bihari Tiwari	5,63,083	48.83	+0.13
INC	Sheila Dikshit	5,17,721	44.89	+18.74
BSP	Zahid Khan	35,126	3.05	
Majority		45,362	3.94	−18.61
Turnout		11,53,220	51.44	+27.09
BJP hold		Swing	+0.13	

=== 11th Lok Sabha: 1997 By-Election ===
Lok Sabha By-election, 1997: East Delhi
Party	Candidate	Votes	%	±%
BJP	Lal Bihari Tiwari	2,64,550	48.24	−0.49
INC	Ashok Kumar Walia	1,42,027	25.89	−9.04
Independent	H. K. L. Bhagat	1,21,364	22.34	+22.25
Majority		1,22,523	22.55	+8.75
Turnout		5,43,383	24.58	−26.19
BJP hold		Swing	-0.03	

=== 11th Lok Sabha: 1996 General Elections ===
1996 Indian general election: East Delhi
Party	Candidate	Votes	%	±%
BJP	Baikunth Lal Sharma	5,38,655	48.73	+8.46
INC	Deep Chand Bandhu	3,86,156	34.93	+2.88
JD	Chaudhari Kesari Singh	48,455	4.38	−16.70
AIIC(T)	Jitender Kumar	38,401	3.47	
Majority		1,52,499	13.80	+5.58
Turnout		11,05,410	50.54	+2.31
BJP hold		Swing	+8.46	

=== 10th Lok Sabha: 1991 General Elections ===
1991 Indian general election: East Delhi
Party	Candidate	Votes	%	±%
BJP	B. L. Sharma (Prem)	303,141	40.27	
INC	H. K. L. Bhagat	241,316	32.05	−17.74
JD	Ram Bir Singh Bidhuri	158,712	21.08	+15.83
Majority		61,825	8.22	−16.15
Turnout		752,846	48.23	−1.40
BJP gain from INC		Swing		

=== 9th Lok Sabha: 1989 General Elections ===
1989 Indian general election: East Delhi
Party	Candidate	Votes	%	±%
INC	H K L Bhagat	359,602	49.79	−27.16
Independent	Chand Ram	183,603	25.42	
BSP	Kanshi Ram	81,095	11.23	
JD	Kishor Lal	37,925	5.25	
Majority		175,999	24.37	−37.84
Turnout		722,183	49.63	−11.72
INC hold		Swing	-27.16	

=== 8th Lok Sabha: 1984 General Elections ===
1984 Indian general election: East Delhi
Party	Candidate	Votes	%	±%
INC	H K L Bhagat	386,150	76.95	+21.95
JP	Kishore Lal	73,970	14.74	−19.17
Majority		312,180	62.21	+41.12
Turnout		501,822	61.35	−1.01
INC hold		Swing	+21.95	

=== 7th Lok Sabha: 1980 General Elections ===
1980 Indian general election: East Delhi
Party	Candidate	Votes	%	±%
INC(I)	H K L Bhagat	228,727	55.00	+24.64
JP	Kishore Lal	141,019	33.91	−34.04
JP(S)	Mir Singh	25,539	6.14	
Majority		87,708	21.09	−16.50
Turnout		415,881	62.36	−7.77
INC(I) gain from BLD		Swing	+24.64	

=== 6th Lok Sabha: 1977 General Elections ===
1977 Indian general election: East Delhi
Party	Candidate	Votes	%	±%
JP	Kishore Lal	240,594	67.95	
INC	H K L Bhagat	107,487	30.36	−33.76
RPI	Radhey Shyam	3,748	1.06	
Majority		133,107	37.59	+5.12
Turnout		354,078	70.13	+5.31
JP gain from INC		Swing		

=== 5th Lok Sabha: 1971 General Elections ===
1971 Indian general election: East Delhi
Party	Candidate	Votes	%	±%
INC	H K L Bhagat	146,632	64.12	+18.65
ABJS	Hardayal Devgun	72,382	31.65	−17.11
INC(O)	Fateh Singh	5,717	2.50	
Majority		74,250	32.47	+29.18
Turnout		228,685	64.82	−2.47
INC gain from ABJS		Swing	+18.65	

=== 4th Lok Sabha: 1967 General Elections ===
1967 Indian general election: East Delhi
Party	Candidate	Votes	%	±%
ABJS	Hardayal Devgun	83,261	48.76	
INC	B Mohan	77,645	45.47	
RPI	V N Kaushik	9,855	5.77	
Majority		5,616	3.29	
Turnout		170,761	67.29	

== See also ==
- List of constituencies of the Lok Sabha
- Outer Delhi (Lok Sabha constituency)
