= Yogender Chandoliya =

Indian politician

Yogender Chandolia
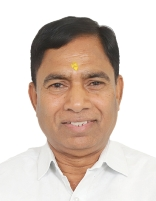

Member of Parliament, Lok Sabha
- Incumbent
- Assumed office 4 June 2024
- Preceded by: Hans Raj Hans
- Constituency: North West Delhi

Municipal Councillor
- In office 2007–2017
- Preceded by: New ward created
- Succeeded by: Sushila Khorwal

Personal details
- Born: May 22, 1962 (age 63)
- Party: Bharatiya Janata Party
- Occupation: Businessman

Yogender Chandolia (also spelled as Yogender Chandoliya) is an Indian politician from Bharatiya Janata Party. He is currently a Member of Parliament from North West Delhi.

== Political career ==
He has been active in politics since his college days and has been elected as the Municipal Councillor several times and was the Chairperson Standing Committee of the Municipal Corporation of Delhi (MCD). He was also a Municipal Councilor for Dev Nagar, Karol Bagh Zone, Delhi. He had also contested from Karol Bagh constituency in 2015 and 2020 Delhi Assembly elections.

He was elected as a Member of Parliament from North West Delhi constituency in the 18th Lok Sabha by defeating the INDIA candidate, Udit Raj.
