= Manoj Kumar (Delhi politician) =

Indian politician

Member of the Delhi Legislative Assembly for Kondli
- In office December 2013 – January 2020
- Preceded by: Amrish Singh Gautam
- Succeeded by: Kuldeep Kumar

Personal details
- Born: Delhi, India
- Party: Aam Aadmi Party

Manoj Kumar is an Indian politician of Aam Aadmi Party.

== Political career ==
Kumar was elected in the 2013 Delhi legislative assembly election from Kondli, defeating Dushyant Kumar Gautam of Bharatiya Janata Party by 7490 votes.

In 2015, Manoj Kumar was arrested in a case of alleged cheating and land grabbing. Kumar then complained of chest pain and was hospitalized, but AIIMS discharged him saying that he didn't need hospitalization.

== Convictions ==
In 2019, Manoj Kumar was sentenced to 3 months in prison for obstruction of polling process. He was subsequently convicted of assault on woman a month later.
