= Rohit Kumar Mehraulia =

Indian politician

Member of the Delhi Legislative Assembly
- In office 2020–2025
- Preceded by: Raju Dhingan
- Succeeded by: Ravikant Ujjain
- Constituency: Trilokpuri

Personal details
- Born: 13 November 1976 (age 49) Delhi, India
- Party: Bharatiya Janata Party
- Other political affiliations: Aam Aadmi Party
- Spouse: Shashi
- Children: 2

Rohit Kumar Mehraulia (born 13 November 1976) is an Indian musician and politician who served in the Delhi Legislative Assembly from 2020 until 2025, representing Trilokpuri as a member of the Aam Admi Party.

Rohit Kumar Mehraulia resigned to Aam Aadmi Party on 31 January 2025 ahead of 2025 Delhi Legislative Assembly election.

== Member of Legislative Assembly (2020 - present) ==
Since 2020, he is an elected member of the 7th Delhi Assembly.

Committee assignments of Delhi Legislative Assembly

- Member (2022-2023), Committee on Government Undertakings

== Electoral performance ==
Delhi Assembly elections, 2020: Trilokpuri
Party	Candidate	Votes	%	±%
AAP	Rohit Kumar Mehraulia	69,947	52.36	−6.26
BJP	Kiran Vaidya	57,461	43.01	+7.68
INC	Vijay Kumar	3,262	2.44	−0.80
BSP	Raghu Raj Singh	1,224	0.92	−0.81
NOTA	None of the above	590	0.44	+0.08
Majority		12,486	9.38	−13.91
Turnout		1,33,694	66.67	−5.04
AAP hold		Swing	-6.26	
