= All India Confederation of SC/ST Organisations =

All India Parisangh
- All India Confederation of SC/ST Organizations
- Abbreviation: AICSSO
- Founder: Udit Raj
- Headquarters: New Delhi
- Location: India
- Leader: Udit Raj
- Website: www.aiparisangh.com

All India Confederation of SC/ST Organization, also known as All India Parisangh, is a caste-based organisation formed in 1997 under the leadership of Udit Raj, the national chairman of the confederation. Confederation organises non-political rallies every year since 1997, to continue their demand from the government for reservation, ban on contract system, promotion among other things.

== Maha-Rallies ==
The All India Confederation of SC/ST Organizations called for Maha-Rally (Grand Meeting) under the chairmanship of Dr. Udit Raj (Member of Parliament, Lok-Sabha), It was the 17th Maha-Rally held on 8 December 2014, at Ramlila Maidan, Ajmeri Gate in New Delhi.

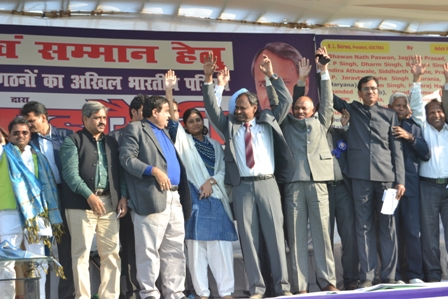
Shri. Satish Upadhyay,[President, BJP, Delhi State], Shri. Nitin Gadkari (Minister of Transport), with Dr. Udit Raj, [National Chairman, All India Confederation of SC/ST Organizations/MP (Lok Sabha)], During Maha-Rally of All India Confederation of SC/ST Organizations at Ramlila Maidan, New Delhi held on 8.12.2014

=== Agenda of Maha-Rally ===
The main objective of maha-rally was to remind the government for the needs of reserved categories (mainly Dalits) of SC/ST.

=== Major Demands of Confederation ===
Demands for reservation in promotion, to readdress the grievances of SC/ST, passing of Bill to strengthen the SC/ST Prevention of Atrocities ACT 1989; Allocation of the budget under the special ban on contract system in safai karamchari work, to regularizing the safai karamcharie's and their time-bound promotion, to have SC/ST organizations to be recognized by government departments, Right of equal education to Dalits.

=== Other Movements of Confederation ===
Due to the racial hate against North-East people residing in Delhi and NCR, in the year 2007, National chairman Dr. Udit Raj held patronage to provide on-spot assistance by establishing North East Support Center & Helpline to the person who is getting victimized by racial haters.

In Jammu on 13 July 2014, the National Chairman of the confederation stressed that the deprived sections of our society must be allowed in private business houses by providing them reservations. He insisted on this statement that, "We cannot achieve a strong nation where there is a bipolarity between the people at the economic and social level."

In November 2012 confederation decided to organize a movement of " Chalo Dilli (March to Delhi)", where over 35 indigenous SC/ST organizations extended their support to the confederation. Mr. Maheshwar Raj, visited Godavarikhani coal belt urging people from deprived sections to support for "Chalo Dilli" movement. The indigenous leaders S.Kumar, Rammurthy helped with his strategies for the success of the program.

The confederation organized its 18th Maharally on 7 December 2015. It mainly focused on the demand for the 117th constitutional amendment bill for Reservations in Promotions to be passed and Reservations to be also given in the Private sector. Dr. Udit Raj also reprimanded Justice J.B.Pardiwala of Gujarat High court who said that 'Reservations and corruption have destroyed the country' in one of his judgments earlier that month.
