= Kishore Lal =

Indian politician

Kishore Lal (also spelled as Kishor Lal) is a former member of the parliament of India from Bharatiya Lok Dal (later known as Janata Party). He won the 1977 Indian general election from the East Delhi (Lok Sabha constituency). In 1977 he defeated Congress stalwart leader H. K. L. Bhagat by a margin of 133,107 votes. Kishore Lal gained 240,594 votes while Harkishan Lal Bhagat alias H.K.L. Bhagat could secure only 107,487 votes. Lal's success in 1977 was part of an infamous defeat of the Congress party in the 1977 election following The Emergency. In 1980, H.K.L Bhagat returned to his seat when he defeated Lal by a margin of 22%. Lal attempted to challenge Bhagat in 1984 and 1989, but was unsuccessful. He did not attempt to challenge the East Delhi seat in 1991.

== Personal life ==
Born at Kulachi Village, Dera Ismail Khan District (now in Pakistan) on 30 December 1932. Mr. KISHORE LAL is the son of Shri Kushi ram. He availed BA degree and later he secured Diploma in Business Management from Delhi University. He married Smt. Promila Kishore on 19 January 1964. He has a son and two daughters.

== Political career ==
Previously associated with Congress, Mr Kishore Lal served as a member of Municipal Corporation of Delhi from 1956 to 1977. He was the leader of opposition in Municipal Corporation of Delhi from 1962 to 1975. During 1969–75, he served as a member of Standing Committee, Municipal Corporation of Delhi. During 1962–75, he was a Member of Delhi Development Authority. He was also associated with the some trade unions. Now he is retired from politics, but continued his social work. He is at present Chairman of Children's Book Trust, New Delhi founded by Cartoonist K. Shankar Pillai better known as Shankar.
