= Ravikant Ujjain =

Indian politician

Member of Delhi Legislative Assembly
- Incumbent
- Assumed office 2025
- Preceded by: Rohit Kumar Mehraulia
- Constituency: Trilokpuri

Personal details
- Party: Bharatiya Janata Party

Ravikant Ujjain is an Indian politician from Bharatiya Janata Party from Delhi. He was elected as a Member of the Legislative Assembly in the 8th Delhi Assembly from Trilokpuri Assembly constituency.
