= Harsh Malhotra =

Indian politician

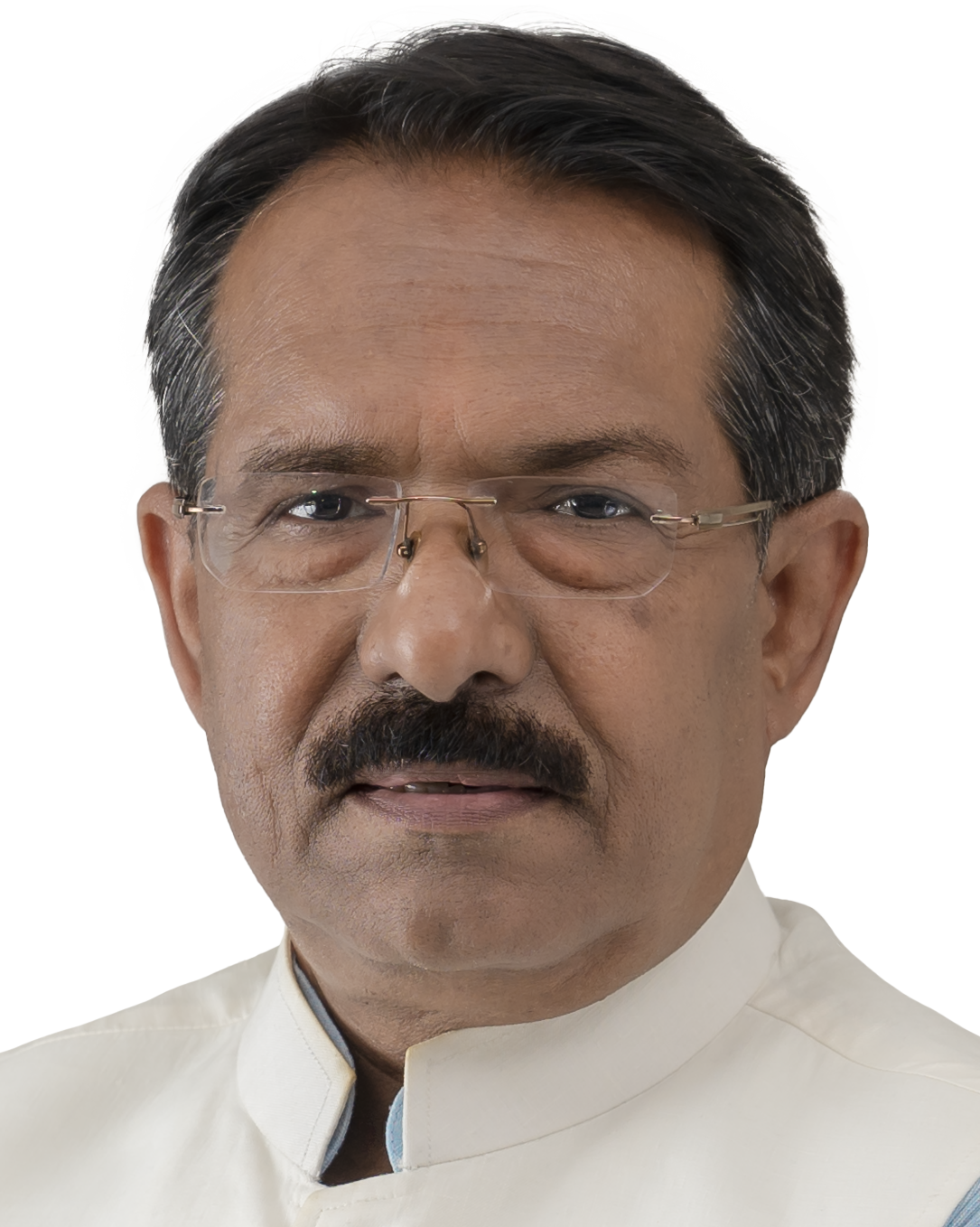

Minister of State in Ministry of Corporate Affairs and Ministry of Road Transport and Highways
- Incumbent
- Assumed office 9 June 2024
- President: Droupadi Murmu
- Prime Minister: Narendra Modi

Member of Parliament, Lok Sabha
- Incumbent
- Assumed office 4 June 2024
- Preceded by: Gautam Gambhir
- Constituency: East Delhi

President of Bharatiya Janata Party, Delhi
- Incumbent
- Assumed office 28 May 2026
- President: Nitin Nabin
- Preceded by: Virender Sachdeva

Personal details
- Party: Bharatiya Janata Party

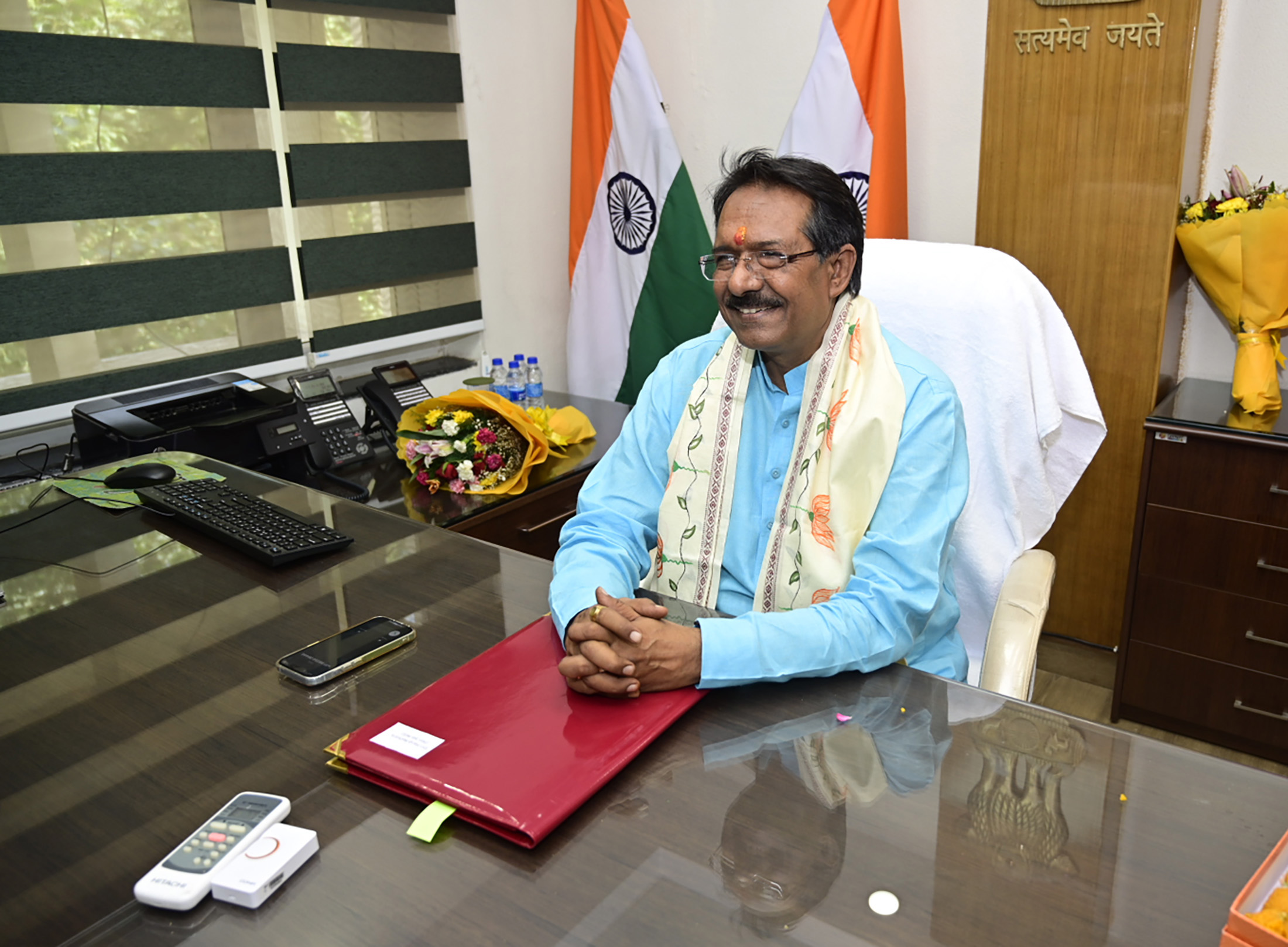
Malhotra takes charge as the Minister of State in Ministry of Road, Transport and Highways

Harsh Malhotra is an Indian politician from Rohtas Nagar, Delhi. He was elected as a Member of Parliament from East Delhi Lok Sabha constituency. He belongs to Bharatiya Janata Party. His extensive political journey is highlighted by significant roles including his impactful tenure as a councillor and subsequently the Mayor of the East Delhi Municipal Corporation. He is currently serving as the State President of BJP in Delhi.

== See also ==
- Third Modi ministry
