= Kuldeep Kumar =

Indian politician

Member of Delhi Legislative Assembly
- Incumbent
- Assumed office 2020
- Preceded by: Manoj Kumar
- Constituency: Kondli

Personal details
- Party: Aam Aadmi Party (2012–present)

Kuldeep Kumar is an Indian politician from the Aam Aadmi Party and member of the Delhi Legislative Assembly. He was elected in 2020 from Kondli. He has been involved in social work since 18 and has founded the organisation Ambedkar Andolan to impart education among SC youth. He was elected to the Delhi Municipal Corporation in 2017 at the age of 27 making him the youngest ever DMC corporator. He has also been the leader of opposition in East Delhi Municipal Corporation and the vice-president of the AAP Delhi unit. Kumar comes from a poor working class family and his father used to work as a rickshaw puller and as a safai karmachari (sanitation worker). He was the AAP candidate for East Delhi in the 2024 general election.
