= Gautam Gambhir =

Coach of the Indian cricket team

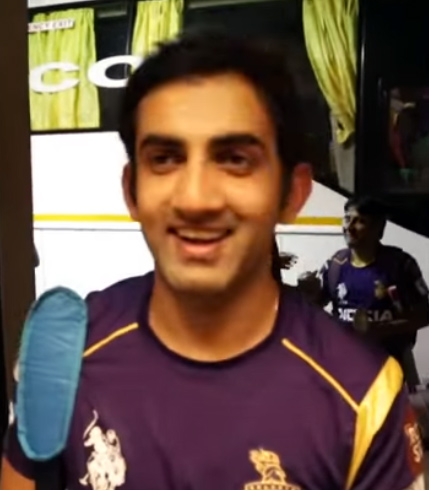
- Gambhir in 2014
- Other names: GG; Gauti
- Spouse: Natasha Jain (m. 2011)
- Father: Deepak Gambhir

Member of Parliament, Lok Sabha
- In office 23 May 2019 – 4 June 2024
- Prime Minister: Narendra Modi
- Preceded by: Maheish Girri
- Succeeded by: Harsh Malhotra
- Constituency: East Delhi

Personal details
- Born: 14 October 1981 (age 45) New Delhi, India
- Party: Bharatiya Janata Party (2019–2024)
- Occupation: Cricketer; Politician
- Awards: Padma Shri (2019)
- Cricket career

Personal information
- Height: 1.67 m (5 ft 6 in)
- Batting: Left-handed
- Bowling: Right-arm leg break
- Role: Top order batter

International information
- National side: India (2003–2016)
- Test debut (cap 249): 3 November 2004 v Australia
- Last Test: 9 November 2016 v England
- ODI debut (cap 149): 11 April 2003 v Bangladesh
- Last ODI: 27 January 2013 v England
- ODI shirt no.: 5
- T20I debut (cap 12): 13 September 2007 v Scotland
- Last T20I: 28 December 2012 v Pakistan
- T20I shirt no.: 5

Domestic team information
- Years: Team
- 1999–2018: Delhi
- 2008–2010; 2018: Delhi Daredevils
- 2011–2017: Kolkata Knight Riders
- 2013: Essex

Head coaching information
- Years: Team
- 2024–: India

Career statistics
Competition	Test	ODI	T20I	FC
Matches	58	147	37	198
Runs scored	4,154	5,238	932	15,153
Batting average	41.95	39.68	27.41	49.35
100s/50s	9/22	11/34	0/7	43/68
Top score	206	150*	75	233*
Catches/stumpings	38/–	36/–	11/–	107/–
Medal record
Men's cricket
Representing India as Player
ICC Cricket World Cup
Winner	2011 India–Bangladesh–Sri Lanka
ICC T20 World Cup
Winner	2007 South Africa
ACC Asia Cup
Winner	2010 Sri Lanka
Runner-up	2008 Pakistan
Representing India as Coach
ICC T20 World Cup
Winner	2026 India-Sri Lanka
ICC Champions Trophy
Winner	2025 Pakistan-UAE
ACC Asia Cup
Winner	2025 United Arab Emirates
- Source: ESPNcricinfo, 29 January 2017

Gautam Gambhir (born 14 October 1981) is a former international cricketer, former politician, and philanthropist who is the current head coach of the Indian cricket team. He played for India in all formats of the game between 2003 and 2016. He was a member of the 17th Lok Sabha from 2019 to 2024 representing East Delhi constituency from the Bharatiya Janata Party. He received the Padma Shri from the Government of India in 2019, the fourth highest civilian award in India. According to The Indian Express, he is the 74th most powerful person in India and the most powerful Indian Sportsman in 2026.

As a cricketer, Gambhir was a left-handed opening batsman who played domestic cricket for Delhi, and captained Kolkata Knight Riders and Delhi Daredevils in the Indian Premier League (IPL). He made his One Day International (ODI) debut against Bangladesh in 2003, and played his first Test the following year against Australia. He captained the Indian team in six ODIs from late 2010 to late 2011 with India winning all six matches. He played an integral part in India's wins in the finals of both the 2007 World Twenty20 (75 runs from 54 balls) and the 2011 Cricket World Cup (97 from 122). Gambhir captained Kolkata Knight Riders to win IPL titles in 2012 and 2014, and later mentored them to the feat in 2024.

Gambhir was the only Indian and one of four international cricketers to have scored hundreds in five consecutive Test matches. He is the only Indian batsman to have scored more than 300 runs in four consecutive Test series. As of July 2024, he is the twelfth highest run-scorer for India in Twenty20 Internationals. He was conferred the Arjuna Award, India's second highest sporting award, in the year 2008 by the President of India. In 2009, he was the number one ranked batsman in ICC Test rankings. The same year, he was the recipient of the ICC Test Player of the Year award.

In December 2018, he announced his retirement from all forms of cricket. In 2019, he joined the Bharatiya Janata Party and was elected to the Lok Sabha from East Delhi. He served as the mentor of Lucknow Super Giants in the IPL for the 2022 and 2023 seasons, and was appointed as the mentor of Kolkata Knight Riders ahead of the 2024 season. In July 2024, he was appointed as the head coach of India for three years till 2027 ODI cricket World Cup. In his first major tournament as head coach, Gambhir led India to victory in the 2026 ICC Men's T20 World Cup and 2025 ICC Champions Trophy. He subsequently guided India to the 2025 Asia Cup, where they defeated Pakistan in the final to claim the title. His tenure has been marked by the adoption of a more aggressive approach in limited-overs cricket, and has drawn both praise and criticism from analysts and former players.

== Early and personal life ==
Gambhir was born in New Delhi to Deepak Gambhir, who manages a textiles business, and Seema Gambhir, a housewife. Gambhir has a sister, Ekta, who is two years younger than him. His grandfather originally came from Multan to Delhi in 1947. Gambhir was adopted by his maternal grandparents eighteen days after his birth and lived with them ever since. Gambhir started playing cricket at the age of 10. He received his schooling from Modern School, New Delhi and did not pursue graduation. He stayed at his maternal uncle Pawan Gulati's residence in the 1990s. Gambhir considers Gulati to be his mentor and would often call him up before important matches. Gambhir was coached by Sanjay Bharadwaj of Lal Bahadur Shastri Academy in Delhi, and Raju Tandon. Gambhir was selected for the first intake of the National Cricket Academy in Bangalore in 2000.

In October 2011, Gambhir married Natasha Jain, who belongs to a prominent business family. He currently resides in Delhi's Rajendra Nagar neighbourhood.

== Indian Premier League ==
Gambhir was signed up by the Delhi Daredevils franchise in the first player auction of the Indian Premier League for US$725,000 a year. He became the second highest run-scorer of the inaugural season with 534 runs from 14 matches. For his performances in 2008, he was named in the ESPNcricinfo IPL XI. He was appointed as the captain of the team for 2010 IPL. At the end of the tournament, he became the only player from Delhi Daredevils to score more than 1000 runs in the IPL.

In the 2011 IPL player auction, Gambhir was the most sought after player, fetching a bid of $2.4 million from the Kolkata Knight Riders, making him the highest paid cricketer in the history of IPL. He was then appointed as the captain of the team. Under Gambhir's captaincy, the Kolkata Knight Riders qualified for the IPL playoffs and also made it to the Champions League Twenty20 for the first time. He eventually led the side to their first title in 2012 by defeating defending champions Chennai Super Kings by 5 wickets at their home ground in Chennai. For his performances in 2012, he was named as captain of the ESPNcricinfo IPL XI. Gambhir is the all-time leading run-scorer of the Kolkata Knight Riders (3375). During the same season, he scored 6 half-centuries out of a total of nine from his team and became only the second player to cross the 2000 runs mark in the history of the IPL. He led the Knight Riders to their second title in 2014 by beating Kings XI Punjab in the final by 3 wickets. He led Kolkata Knight Riders to the playoffs in the 2016 and 2017 seasons and was also their highest run-scorer. For his performances in the 2017 IPL season, he was named in the ESPNcricinfo and Cricbuzz IPL XI.

On 27 January 2018, in the 2018 IPL Auction, he was bought by the Delhi Daredevils for ₹2.8 crore, and was appointed as the captain. Later, Kolkata Knight Riders's CEO Venky Mysore revealed that Gambhir had asked the team not to retain him as he wanted to finish his IPL career where he started. On 25 April, Gambhir stepped down from captaincy citing poor performances of the team, and announced Shreyas Iyer as the new captain of the Delhi Daredevils.

In December 2021, Gambhir was announced the mentor of the new IPL franchise Lucknow Super Giants. On 22 November 2023, he was appointed as the mentor of his former IPL team Kolkata Knight Riders for the upcoming seasons of IPL. He subsequently won the 2024 Indian Premier League with Kolkata Knight Riders as their mentor.

=== Other franchise cricket ===
He captained India Capitals in Legends League Cricket and India Maharajas in the Masters. Under his captaincy the team won the 2022 LLC title.

== International career ==
=== Early career ===
While Gambhir was out of the Test team, he played a number of One Day Internationals for India between 2005 and 2007. However, he was not selected for the 2007 World Cup as the selectors opted for a top-order of Sourav Ganguly, Virender Sehwag, and Sachin Tendulkar. It affected him badly and Gambhir later said that "When I got dropped for the World Cup, there were times I didn't want to play anymore. I didn't want to practise. I couldn't motivate myself." With no other career options, Gambhir stuck with cricket. After India's first-round exit from the tournament, Gambhir was selected for the One Day International on India's 2007 tour of Bangladesh. Believing the series could be his last chance, Gambhir scored his second century on that tour and was subsequently selected for the One Day International on India's tour to Ireland in 2007. He scored an unbeaten 80 against Ireland in the first game of that tour and was awarded the man of the match award for that effort. In the post-match interview, he indicated that performing more consistently was a top priority for his career as he had done so in the past.

Gambhir was selected in India's squad for the 2007 ICC World Twenty20, which India went on to win in South Africa, beating Pakistan in the final. Gambhir performed well in the shortest form of the game, ending the tournament as India's top run scorer, with 227 at an average of 37.83, including three half-centuries which included a crucial 75 runs off 54 balls against Pakistan in the final. He was named in the 'Team of the Tournament' by ESPNcricinfo for the 2007 T20I World Cup.

For his performances in 2007, he was named in the World T20I XI by ESPNcricinfo.

=== Golden form ===
In 2008, Gambhir was forced to miss the Test series in Australia due to a shoulder injury. In the 2007–08 CB Series, he scored an unbeaten 102 at the Gabba against Sri Lanka in a match washed out due to rain. Three weeks later at Sydney, he scored a career-best 113 off 119 balls against Australia, in a high scoring match which India lost by 18 runs. He finished the CB series as the leading run-scorer with 440 runs.

In 2008 Gambhir finally solidified his place in the Indian Test team with a string of high scores. Opening the batting with Delhi teammate Virender Sehwag, he scored 858 runs at over 61 in seven matches as of December including a double century against Australia in the Border–Gavaskar Trophy. However, in the same match, he was involved in controversy when he elbowed bowler Shane Watson while taking a run. Gambhir asserted it was accidental, but was banned for one Test. Gambhir scored 463 runs in the series, which despite missing the last match was more than any other player in the series.

He was the leading run-scorer in the Test series against England in December 2008 and against New Zealand in early 2009, meaning that he had achieved this feat in three consecutive series.

For his performances in 2008, he was named in the World Test XI and ODI XI by ESPNcricinfo.

Gambhir played his first major Test series outside the sub-continent, having toured New Zealand in 2009. In the second Test match, he scored a match-saving 137 in the second innings. He stood more than five sessions in the middle and faced over 430 balls. This innings led Virender Sehwag, Gambhir's opening partner, close friend, and captain for the match, to call him 'The Second Wall' in reference to Rahul Dravid. He then scored 167 in the second innings of the Third Test to give India an unassailable lead, but rain helped the New Zealand batsmen to hang on for a draw. Gambhir, with 445 runs in six innings at an average of 89, helped India win 1–0 to script a series win in that country after 41 years.

=== Through ranks ===
He was named as the ICC Test Player of the Year for 2009, and was briefly ranked the No. 1 batsman in the ICC rankings in July; at the time India were not playing Tests and his points rating did not change, but other batsmen who were ranked higher lost points before regaining them.

He continued his run in the late-2009 Test series against Sri Lanka at home. He scored a century in the second innings of the First Test in Ahmedabad to force a draw after the visitors had taken a first innings lead of more than 300, and then combined in a double century opening partnership with Sehwag on the first day of the Second Test in Kanpur, scoring 167 himself and helping India to score more than 400 runs on the opening day. This set up their score of 642 and an innings victory. Following the match, Gambhir returned to the top of the ICC rankings. Gambhir withdrew from the Third and final Test against Sri Lanka at the Brabourne Stadium in Mumbai in order to attend his sister's wedding.

In the First Test against Bangladesh in Chittagong in January 2009, Gambhir hit a rapid 116 from 129 balls. It was his fifth century in as many Tests and made him the fourth player to achieve this feat. Only Don Bradman has managed six centuries in as many matches. In the 29th Test match against Bangladesh at Dhaka, he rewrote the history of IVA Richards by scoring most fifties plus runs in 11 consecutive matches. In this match, he scored 66 runs.

For his performances in 2009, he was named in the World Test XI by the ICC.

=== Brief captaincy ===
In 2010, Gambhir was appointed captain of the national team in the ODI series against New Zealand which was hosted by India. He scored an unbeaten 126 in the third match in Vadodara to help seal the series, guiding the hosts to victory in the run-chase. He eventually earned the Man-of-the-Series award for leading India to a 5–0 win. He then returned as captain of the side in India's match against the West Indies in December 2011.

=== Post-captaincy ===
In the final of the Cricket World Cup 2011, Gambhir scored a solid knock of 97 from 122 balls. Coming in to bat in the first over after the dismissal of Virender Sehwag, he anchored the Indian inning despite the early dismissal of both the openers. He had a good partnership first with Kohli, and then a match-winning partnership of 109 runs with MS Dhoni.

In 2011, India's batting line-up struggled in Tests, particularly away from home. Out of sixteen innings in away Tests, India passed 300 just twice and both the team's opening batsmen failed to score a century in the format in the whole of 2011. Between February 2010 and November 2011, Gambhir played in 14 Tests. From 25 innings he scored 704 runs at an average of 29.33. In the same period, only two opening batsmen who had played at least 15 innings had a worse average: Phillip Hughes of Australia and Imrul Kayes of Bangladesh. However, while he was struggling in Tests, Gambhir enjoyed a rich run of form in ODIs, averaging 56.90 from 23 matches. Gambhir opened the batting in all four of India's Test defeats against Australia in 2011–12. He scored 181 runs at an average of 22.62.

For his performances in 2012, he was named in the World ODI XI by the ICC.

On 12 February 2012, Gambhir scored 92 off 111 balls in an ODI match against Australia at the Adelaide Oval, to help India win their first match against the hosts at that venue. It was also India's highest successful run chase in Australia. For his effort, Gambhir won the Man of the Match award. On 14 February 2012, against Sri Lanka, Gambhir yet again missed out on an ODI hundred when he was dismissed run out for a fine 91 off 106 balls. This knock from Gambhir was instrumental in securing a thrilling tie in that match. In August 2012, the Indian selection committee handed him back vice-captaincy of the T20 squad for the World Cup.

=== Comeback ===
After a big absence from international cricket, on 8 October 2016, Gambhir was recalled for the Test-Match series against New Zealand, after showing good form in domestic cricket.

=== Retirement ===
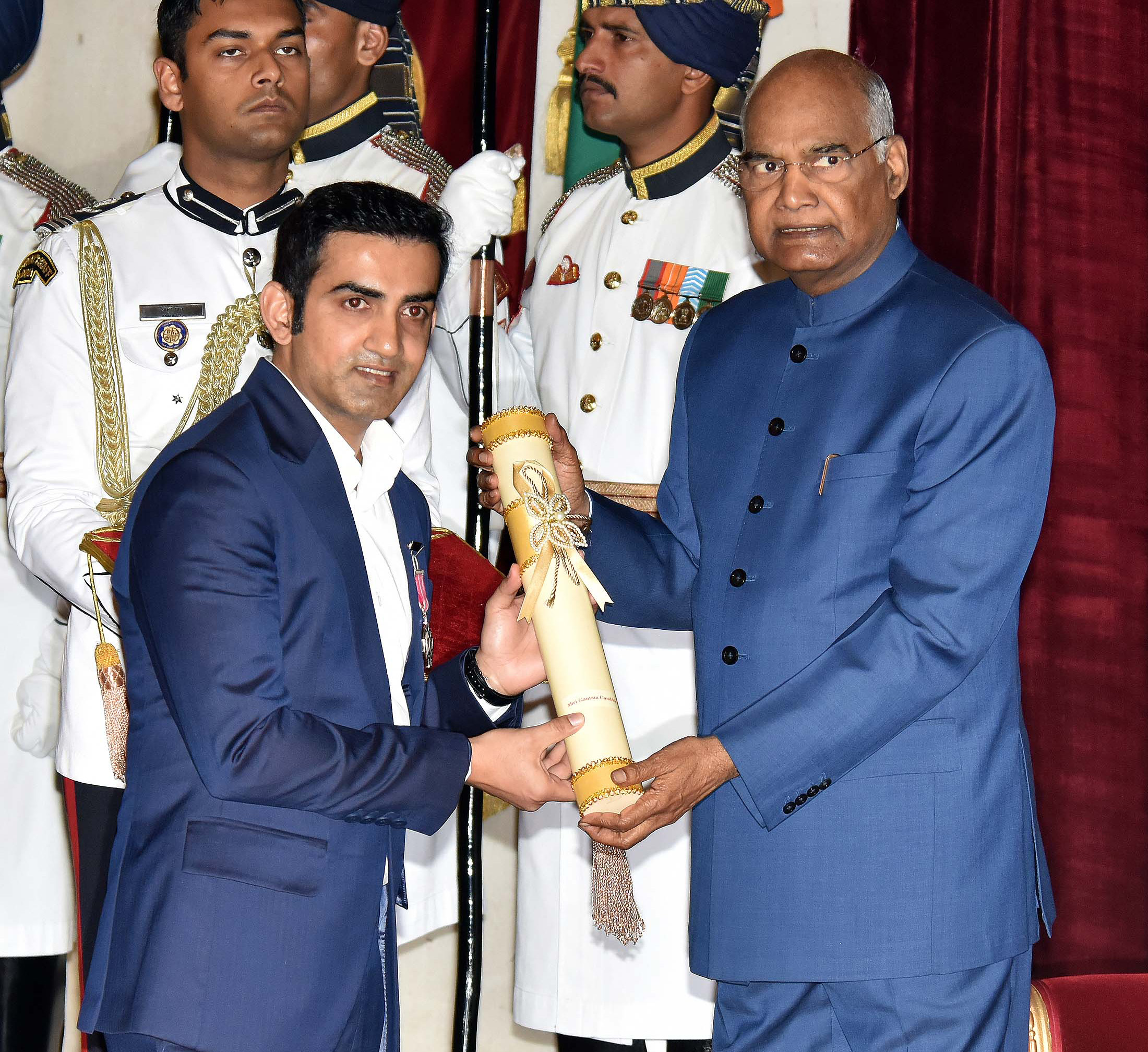
Indian President Ram Nath Kovind presenting the Padma Shri Award to Gautam Gambhir on 16 March 2019

In October 2018, during the quarter-finals of the 2018–19 Vijay Hazare Trophy, he scored his 10,000th run in List A cricket. Gambhir announced his retirement from all forms of cricket on 3 December 2018, ahead of his final match for the Delhi cricket team against the Andhra cricket team in the Ranji Trophy on 6 December 2018. Gambhir went on to score 112 in his final innings, his 43rd century in first-class cricket. Gautam Gambhir began his new innings as a parliamentarian as he took oath as the Lok Sabha MP on 17 June 2019.

In 2024, Gambhir announced his retirement from politics to focus on cricketing activities.

=== Coaching career ===
In 2022, Gautam Gambhir joined the Lucknow Super Giants (LSG) in the Indian Premier League (IPL) as a mentor. Under his guidance, the team reached the playoffs in both the 2022 and 2023 IPL seasons. In late 2023, he left LSG and returned to Kolkata Knight Riders (KKR) as a mentor for the 2024 IPL season, leading the team to their third IPL title in 2024.

On 9 July 2024, Gambhir was appointed as the head coach of the Indian national cricket team, succeeding Rahul Dravid. His first major assignment as head coach was the 2025 ICC Champions Trophy, where India emerged victorious, winning the trophy for the third time.

Later in the year, he guided India to the 2025 Asia Cup, defeating Pakistan in the final to secure another major title. He then guided India to the 2026 ICC Men's T20 World Cup victory becoming the first Indian coach to win two ICC trophies. His tenure has been marked by the adoption of a more aggressive, high-risk style of play in limited-overs formats, which has drawn both praise and criticism from analysts and former players.

During his tenure as the head coach, the Indian team lost their first Test series in 2024 since 2012, when New Zealand whitewashed India. A year later, in November 2025, India faced another Test series defeat at home by South Africa.Under his tenure, the performance of the team dipped significantly in tests. India under Gambhir only won two test series till July 2026, both coming against the low profile teams of Bangladesh and West Indies. His only significant achievement in the test format till now is the series draw against England away from home.He remains the only Indian coach to have lost two test series at home and has an uncharacteristic less than 50 percent win percentage in the format.

== Gautam Gambhir Foundation ==
The Gambhir Foundation is the philanthropic initiative of Gautam Gambhir. It was started in 2014 and is based out of Delhi. He set up community kitchens in 2017 through the Foundation in Patel Nagar, Delhi, in a bid to make sure no one slept hungry in the city. The key project of the Foundation is to reach out to as many children of paramilitary martyrs as possible and empower them by supporting their entire educational needs. Apart from this, the GGF works with adolescent girls from underprivileged homes in generating awareness on nutrition, health and hygiene, and an effort to make Delhi green by planting trees the city to fight air pollution in the city. In 2020, he announced a scheme to provide free meals to the needy in his constituency. The scheme, called "Gambhir ki Rasoi," aims to provide hot meals to people who are facing financial difficulties due to the COVID-19 pandemic.

== Political career ==
On 22 March 2019, he joined the Bharatiya Janata Party (BJP) in the presence of Union ministers Arun Jaitley and Ravi Shankar Prasad. He was the party's candidate from East Delhi in the 2019 Indian general election. After his opponent Atishi Marlena challenged him to a debate, Gambhir declined her challenge, saying he doesn't believe in "dharna and debates." Gautam won the elections by 695,109 votes against Atishi Marlena and Arvinder Singh Lovely.

Gambhir visited the Ghazipur landfill many times and has taken initiatives regarding it. Gambhir also installed air purifiers in his constituency. Gambhir donated his two years salary as MP during COVID-19 pandemic. Gambhir through his foundation started COVID-19 vaccination camps in his constituency. In Gambhir's constituency Delhi BJP performed well in 2020 Delhi legislative elections and 2022 Delhi MCD elections.

On 2 March 2024, he announced that he has requested BJP National President JP Nadda to relieve him of political duties as he wants to focus on cricket commitments.

== Other work ==
Gambhir has started work at his constituency of East Delhi, installing CCTV cameras to tackle the issue of women's safety which has plagued Delhi in recent times. He is also the Brand Ambassador for Pinnacle Industries' Pinnacle Specialty Vehicles.
