= Rashtriya Janshakti Party- Secular =

India's political party led by Sanjay Siwal

The Rashtriya Janshakti Party- Secular (Rashtriya Janshakti Party- Secular), is a political party in India. The RJP is led by party president Sanjay Siwal.
