= Baikunth Lal Sharma =

Indian politician (1929–2019)

B. L. Sharma (Prem)

Delhi

Personal details
- Born: 17 December 1929; Ferozepur (Punjab)
- Died: 28 September 2019 (aged 89)
- Political party: Bharatiya Janata Party
- Spouse: Krishna Sharma
- Children: One Son, Two Daughters
- Education: Graduate

Baikunth Lal Sharma (Prem) (17 December 1929 – 28 September 2019) was an Indian politician from Delhi. He was a member of Parliament during 10th and 11th Lok Sabha from East Delhi as a BJP candidate.

Sharma was elected to the Lok Sabha in 1991 from North-East Delhi, when he defeated HKL Bhagat of Indian National Congress. For this, he was called a giant killer in the media. In 1996, he retained his seat, defeating the Congress candidate Deep Chand Bandhu. He lost the 2009 General Election from the same constituency.
