= North West Delhi Lok Sabha constituency =

Lok Sabha Constituency in Delhi

Coordinates: 28.7730°N 77.0890°E

North West Delhi DL-5
- Lok Sabha constituency
- Interactive Map Outlining North West Delhi Lok Sabha constituency

Constituency details
- Country: India
- Region: North India
- Union Territory: Delhi
- Assembly constituencies: Narela; Badli; Rithala; Bawana; Mundka; Kirari; Sultanpur Majra; Nangloi Jat; Mangol Puri; Rohini
- Established: 2009
- Reservation: SC

Member of Parliament
- 18th Lok Sabha
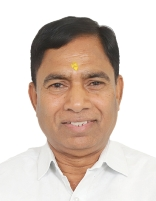
- Incumbent Yogender Chandoliya
- Party: BJP
- Alliance: NDA
- Elected year: 2024

North West Delhi Lok Sabha constituency is one of the 7 Lok Sabha (parliamentary) constituencies in the Indian National Capital Territory of Delhi. This constituency came into existence in 2008 as part of the implementation of the recommendations of the Delimitation Commission of India constituted in 2002. This constituency is reserved for the candidates from the Scheduled castes.

== Assembly segments ==
The North West Delhi Lok Sabha constituency comprises the following Delhi Vidhan Sabha segments:

#	Name	District	Member	Party	Leading (in 2024)
1	Narela	North Delhi	Raj Karan Khatri	BJP	BJP
5	Badli	North Delhi	Deepak Chaudhary	BJP	BJP
6	Rithala	North West Delhi	Kulwant Rana	BJP	BJP
7	Bawana (SC)	North Delhi	Ravinder Singh	BJP	BJP
8	Mundka	North West Delhi	Gajender Drall	BJP	BJP
9	Kirari	North West Delhi	Anil Jha Vats	AAP	BJP
10	Sultanpur Majra (SC)	North West Delhi	Mukesh Kumar Ahlawat	AAP	INC
11	Nangloi Jat	West Delhi	Manoj Kumar Shokeen	BJP	BJP
12	Mangol Puri (SC)	North West Delhi	Raj Kumar Chauhan	BJP	BJP
13	Rohini	North Delhi	Vijender Gupta	BJP	BJP

== Members of Parliament ==
The North-West Delhi Lok Sabha constituency was created in 2009. The list of Member of Parliament (MP) is as follows:

Year	Member	Party
Till 2009 : Constituency did not exist
2009	Krishna Tirath	Indian National Congress
2014	Udit Raj	Bharatiya Janata Party
2019	Hans Raj Hans	Bharatiya Janata Party
2024	Yogender Chandoliya	Bharatiya Janata Party

== Election results ==
=== 2024 ===
2024 Indian general election: North West Delhi
Party	Candidate	Votes	%	±%
BJP	Yogender Chandoliya	866,483	58.26	▼2.22
INC	Udit Raj	5,75,634	38.71	▲21.83
NOTA	None of the above	8,984	0.6	▼0.13
Majority		2,90,849	19.55	▼12.02
Turnout		14,90,322	58.01	▼0.96
BJP hold		Swing		

=== 2019 ===
2019 Indian general elections: North West Delhi
Party	Candidate	Votes	%	±%
BJP	Hans Raj Hans	848,630	60.48	▲14.05
AAP	Gugan Singh Ranga	2,94,766	21.01	▼17.55
INC	Rajesh Lilothia	2,36,882	16.88	▲5.27
NOTA	None of the Above	10,210	0.73	▲0.08
Majority		5,53,897	39.48	▲31.60
Turnout		14,02,986	58.97	▼2.83
BJP hold		Swing	▲14.05	

=== 16th Lok Sabha: 2014 General Elections ===
2014 Indian general elections: North West Delhi
Party	Candidate	Votes	%	±%
BJP	Udit Raj	629,860	46.44	▲11.11
AAP	Rakhi Birla	5,23,058	38.56	New
INC	Krishna Tirath	1,57,468	11.61	▼45.23
BSP	Basant Panwar	21,485	1.58	▼3.62
none of the above	None of the Above	8,826	0.65	N/A
Majority		1,06,802	7.88	▼13.63
Turnout		13,56,036	61.80	▲14.11
BJP gain from INC		Swing	▼10.40	

=== 15th Lok Sabha: 2009 General Elections ===
2009 Indian general elections: North West Delhi
Party	Candidate	Votes	%	±%
INC	Krishna Tirath	487,404	56.84	
BJP	Meera Kanwaria	3,02,971	35.33	
BSP	Rakesh Hans	44,615	5.20	
SP	Sunil Parchha	4,479	0.52	
IND.	Harbans Lal	3,430	0.40	
Margin of victory		1,84,433	21.51	
Turnout		8,57,543	47.69	
INC win (new seat)				

== See also ==
- List of constituencies of the Lok Sabha
- Outer Delhi (Lok Sabha constituency)
