= Hans Raj Hans =

Indian singer and politician (born 1962)

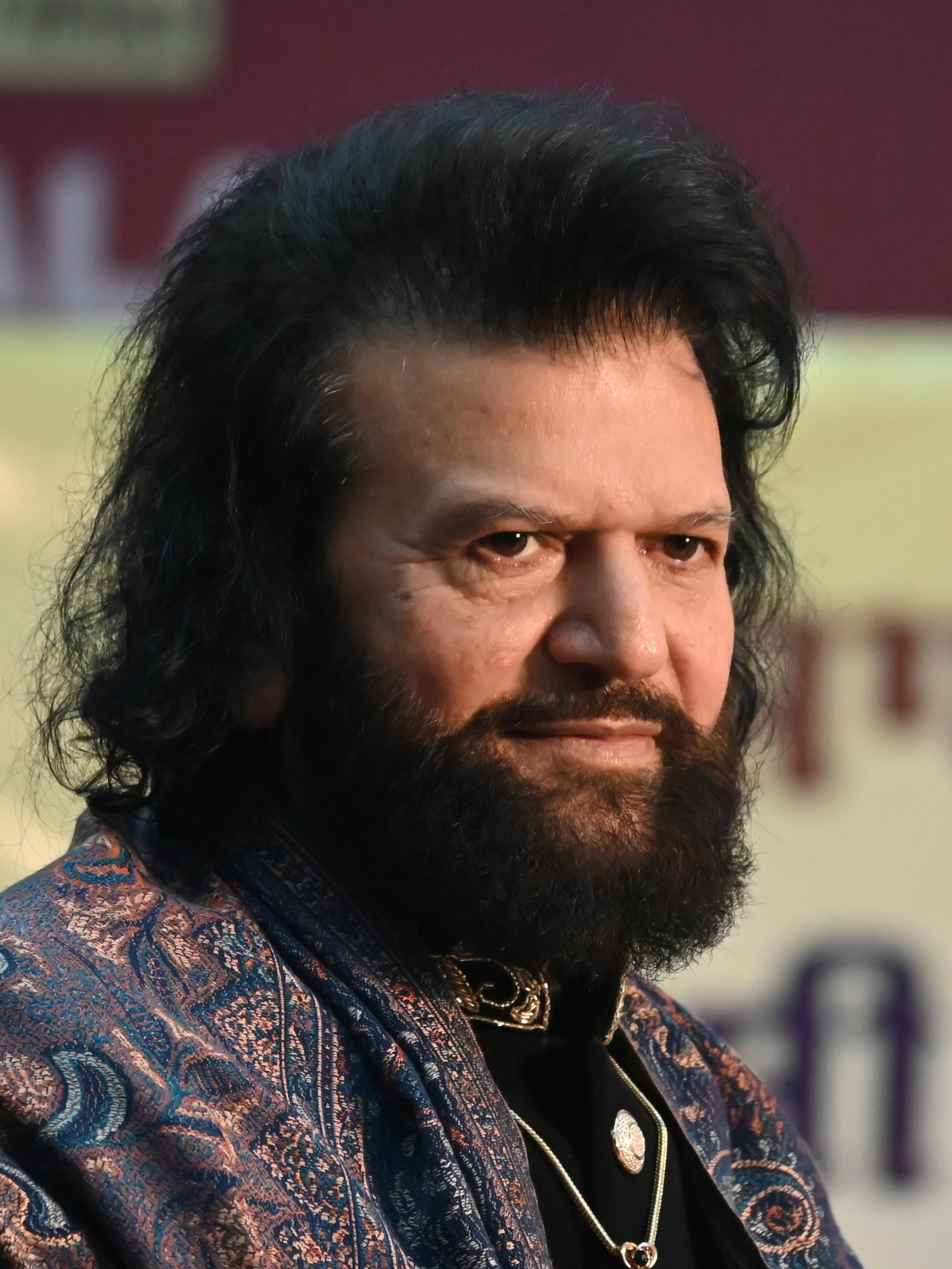
- Official portrait, 2024

Member of Parliament, Lok Sabha
- In office 23 May 2019 – 4 June 2024
- Preceded by: Udit Raj
- Succeeded by: Yogender Chandoliya
- Constituency: North-West Delhi

Personal details
- Born: 9 April 1962 (age 64) Shafipur, Punjab, India
- Party: Bharatiya Janata Party
- Children: Navraj Hans and Yuvraj Hans
- Website: www.hansrajhans.org
- Musical career
- Origin: Jalandhar, Punjab, India
- Years active: 1983 – present

Hans Raj Hans (born 9 April 1962) is an Indian singer and politician. He is a member of the Bharatiya Janata Party and a recipient of the civilian honour of Padma Shri. He sings Punjabi folk and Sufi music as well as in movies and has also released his own 'Punjabi-pop' albums. He has worked alongside other artists, such as Nusrat Fateh Ali Khan in the movie Kachche Dhaage.

== Early life ==
Hans Raj Hans was born in a Mazhabi Sikh family the village of Shafipur, near to Jalandhar, Punjab, India. Hans graduated from DAV College, Jalandhar. In his teen years, Hans was trained in singing by Ustad Puran Shah Koti. In 2014, it was reported that Hans Raj converted to Islam, however he has denied this claim.

== Musical career ==
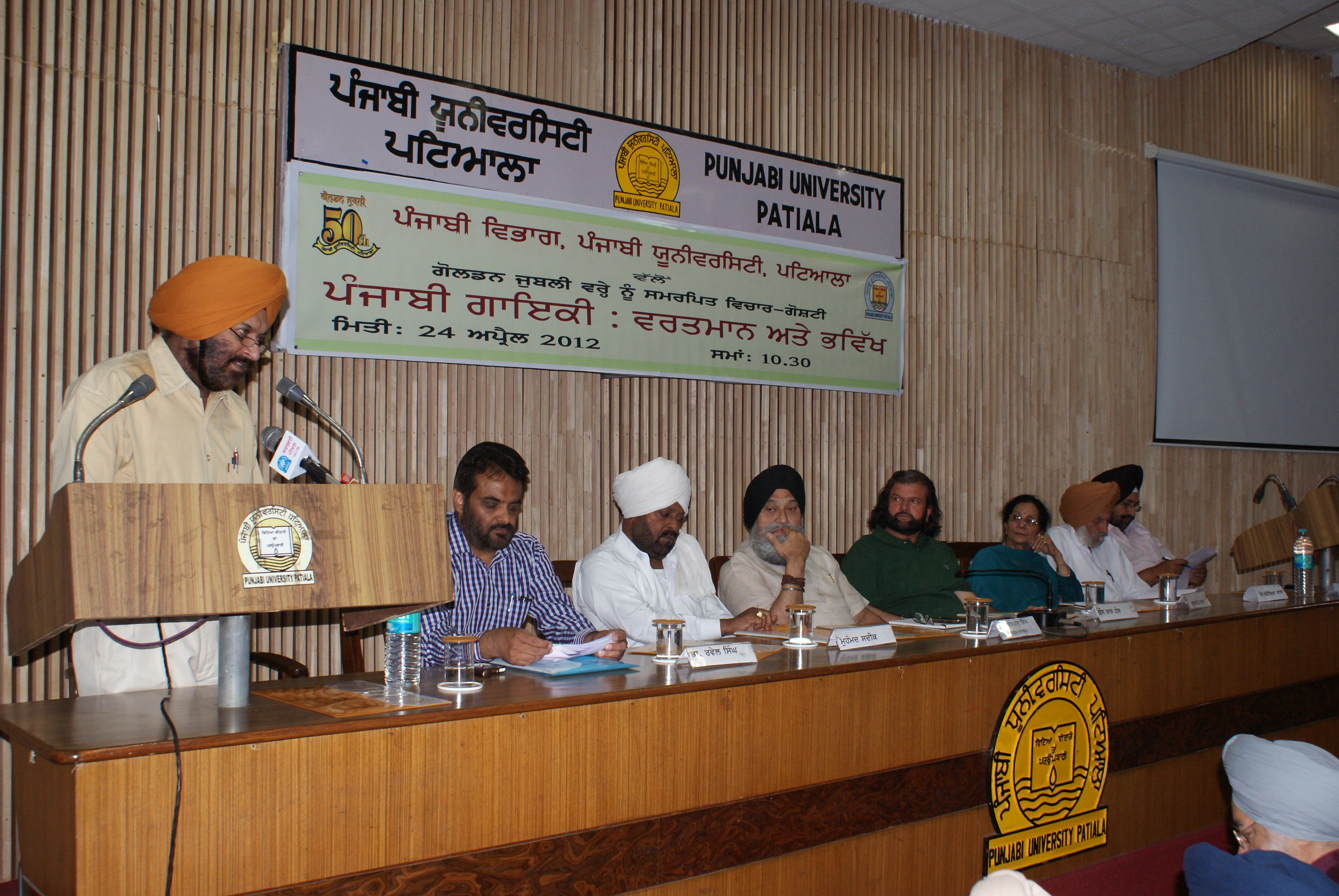
Punjabi gayki seminar

In his youth, Hans learned from music director Charanjit Ahuja. Then he started singing Punjabi folk, devotional, and Sufi music. He worked with Nusrat Fateh Ali Khan in the movie Kachche Dhaage.

Hans has been an honorary music professor at Washington DC University and San Jose State University.

== Political career ==
Hans joined Shiromani Akali Dal in January 2009 and in May of that year, he contested unsuccessfully from Jalandhar Lok Sabha constituency. Later he resigned from Shiromani Akali Dal on 18 December 2014. In February 2016, he joined Indian National Congress and later in December 2016, he joined Bharatiya Janata Party. In 2019 Indian general election, he was elected from the North West Delhi Lok Sabha constituency. In 2024 Indian general election, he unsuccessfully contested from Faridkot Lok Sabha constituency and stood at fifth position.

== Discography ==
=== Albums ===
- 2017 Mundeh Punjabi
- 2014 Jaadu
- 2011 Ek Ishaaaaa
- 2008 Yaara O Yaara
- 2007 Wanjara
- 2004 The Knight
- 2003 Tera Ishq
- 2002 Haaye Sohniye
- 2002 Ghama Di Raat
- 2001 Sab Ton Sohni
- 2001 Jhanjar
- 2000 Chorni
- 1996 Lal Garara
- 1994 Mohabbat
- 1993 Ishqe Di Barsaat
- 1992 Jhanjaria
- 1992 Aar Tutdi Naa Paar Tutdi
- 1991 Thah Karke
- 1990 Tera Mera Pyar
- 1990 Ashiqan Di Kahdi Zindagi
- 1990 Waris Punjab De
- 1989 Balle Ni Rahe Rahe
- 1987 Ek Dang Hor Mar Ja
- 1987 Ek Kuri Mainu Rajheon Fakir Kar Gai
- 1983 Jogian De Kanna Vich

=== Bollywood ===
- 2018 Sonu Ke Titu Ki Sweety
- 2011 Mausam
- 2011 Patiala House
- 2008 Black & White - "Haq Allah" with Sukhwinder Singh
- 2002 Bend It Like Beckham
- 2002 23 March 1931: Shaheed
- 2001 Nayak
- 2001 Jodi No. 1
- 2001 Monsoon Wedding
- 2000 Bichhoo
- 1999 Kachche Dhaage

=== Sufi Songs ===
- 2024 Rehnuma e Mohtaram (Allied Studios)

=== Religious ===
- 2011 Amrit Varga Paani (with Sardool Sikander) World Music
- 2009 Koi Aan Milavai (featuring Sant Anoop Singh (Una Sahib Wale) & Bhai Maninder Singh (Sri Nagar Wale))
- 2008 300 Saala Hazoor Sahib (T-Series)
- 2006 Bole So Nihaal (duo collaboration with Sardool Sikander)
- 2006 Sikhi Diyan Shaana
- 2004 Nikey Nikey Do Khalse (T-Series)
- 2003 Wadda Mera Govind
- 2000 Amritdhara
- 1997 Mera Bajaan Wala Maahi
- 1991 Patta Patta Singhan Da Vairi (T-Series)

=== Filmography ===
- Dupatta Tera Sat Rang Da (Speed Records)

=== Biography ===
- Rags to Ragas... and Beyond - Hans Raj Hans by Preet Inder Dhillon, Power Publishers

== Accolades ==
Award Ceremony	Category	Recipient	Result	Ref.(s)
4th Mirchi Music Awards	Male Vocalist of The Year	"Ik Tu Hi Tu Hi" from Mausam	Nominated	
