= Udit Raj =

Indian politician

Dr. Udit Raj

Member of Parliament, Lok Sabha
- In office 16 May 2014 – 23 May 2019
- Preceded by: Krishna Tirath
- Succeeded by: Hans Raj Hans
- Constituency: North West Delhi

Personal details
- Born: 1 January 1958 (age 68) Ramnagar, Uttar Pradesh, India
- Party: Indian National Congress (2019–present)
- Other political affiliations: Bharatiya Janata Party (2014–2019); Indian Justice Party (2003–2014)
- Spouse: Seema Raj (m. 1990)
- Children: 2
- Education: Osmania University (MA, 1988); CCS University (LLB); India Bible College and Seminary, Rajasthan (Hon. Dr.); Jawaharlal Nehru University (Alumni)
- Profession: Civil servant (Indian Revenue Service), social activist, writer, politician
- Website: druditraj.com

Udit Raj (born 1 January 1958) is an Indian politician and retired Indian Revenue Service officer who is a member of the Indian National Congress. He was a member of parliament between 2014 and 2019 in the Lok Sabha, representing North West Delhi as a member of the Bharatiya Janata Party but left the party after its first term. Before joining the politics, he was a civil servant and a former Deputy Commissioner, Joint Commissioner and Additional Commissioner of Income Tax at New Delhi.

Raj is also the national chairman of the Confederation of Dalit, OBC, Minorities and Adivasi organisations (DOMA Parisangh).

== Political career ==
On 24 November 2003, he resigned from government service and formed the Indian Justice Party.

He merged the Indian Justice Party with the Bharatiya Janata Party on 23 February 2014, and was elected as a member of parliament on the BJP ticket. Later he joined the Indian National Congress on 24 April 2019, citing differences of opinion on BJP's approach to inclusivity and its internal politics.
