= Indian Justice Party =

- Abbreviation: IJP
- Leader: Udit Raj
- Founded: 9 December 2003
- Dissolved: 24 February 2014
- Merged into: Bharatiya Janata Party
- Headquarters: 5, Pusa Road, 3rd Floor, Karol Bagh, New Delhi, India 110005
- Ideology: Social Democratic; Dalit Socialism
- ECI status: State party

Indian Justice Party (IJP) was a political party in India that was established in 2003 by Udit Raj, an Indian Revenue Service officer who had resigned to form the party.

== Merger with Bharatiya Janta Party ==
Udit Raj, Founder and head of the National Confederation of SCs/STs on 24 February 2014 announced merger of his party to Bharatiya Janata Party in presence of BJP National President Rajnath Singh. Mr. Raj said "I had talked to BJP on issues related to role of Dalits in governance and running the country, and only after that he decided to join the BJP.
