= Sahib Singh Verma ministry =

- 4th Ministry of Delhi
- Date formed: 27 February 1996
- Date dissolved: 12 October 1998

People and organisations
- Head of state: Lt Governor Vijai Kapoor
- Head of government: Sahib Singh Verma
- Member parties: Bharatiya Janata Party
- Status in legislature: Majority

History
- Election: 1993
- Predecessor: Khurana ministry
- Successor: Swaraj ministry

The Verma cabinet was the Council of Ministers in first Delhi Legislative Assembly headed by Chief Minister Sahib Singh Verma.

== Council of ministers ==
Name	Office	Portfolio	Took office	Left office	Party
Sahib Singh Verma	Chief Minister		27 February 1996	12 October 1998	BJP
Rajendra Gupta	Minister	Transport	27 February 1996	12 October 1998	BJP
Dr. Harsh Vardhan	Minister	Health and Family Welfare, Education	27 February 1996	12 October 1998	BJP
Harsharan Singh Balli	Minister	Industry, Labour, Jails, Languages and Gurudwara Administration	27 February 1996	12 October 1998	BJP
Dr. Jagdish Mukhi	Minister	Excise, Technical Education, Finance	27 February 1996	12 October 1998	BJP
Purnima Sethi	Minister	Civil supplies & environment	27 February 1996	12 October 1998	BJP
Surendra Pal Ratawal	Minister	Welfare, Labour, Tourism and Employment	27 February 1996	12 October 1998	BJP
Lal Bihari Tiwari	Minister	Development	27 February 1996	12 October 1998	BJP
