= Swaraj ministry =

- 5th Ministry of Delhi
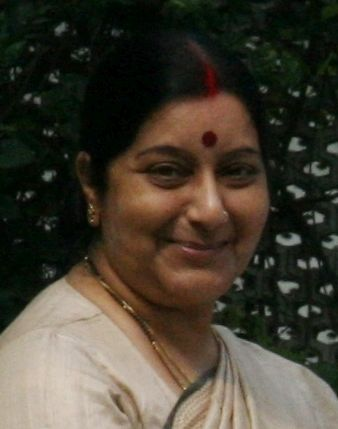
- Sushma Swaraj
- Date formed: 12 October 1998
- Date dissolved: 3 December 1998

People and organisations
- Head of state: Lt Governor Vijai Kapoor
- Head of government: Sushma Swaraj
- Member parties: Bharatiya Janata Party
- Status in legislature: Majority

History
- Election: 1993
- Predecessor: Sahib Singh Verma ministry
- Successor: First Dikshit ministry

Sushma Swaraj of Bharatiya Janata Party was Chief Minister of Delhi from 12 October 1998 to 3 December 1998.

== List of ministers ==
The names of the ministers of her ministry are:

== Council of Ministers (October 12, 1998 - December 3, 1998) ==
Portfolio	Minister	Took office	Left office	Party
Chief Minister	Sushma Swaraj	12 October 1998	3 December 1998	BJP
Home	Sushma Swaraj	12 October 1998	3 December 1998	BJP
Health and Family Welfare, Education	Harsh Vardhan	12 October 1998	3 December 1998	BJP
Excise, Technical Education, Finance	Jagdish Mukhi	12 October 1998	3 December 1998	BJP
Civil supplies & environment	Purnima Sethi	12 October 1998	3 December 1998	BJP
Transport	Devender Singh Shokeen	12 October 1998	3 December 1998	BJP
Industry, Labour, Jails, Languages and Gurudwara Administration	Harsharan Singh Balli	12 October 1998	3 December 1998	BJP
Welfare, Labour, Tourism and Employment	Surendra Pal Ratawal	12 October 1998	3 December 1998	BJP
