= Khurana ministry =

- 3rd Ministry of Delhi
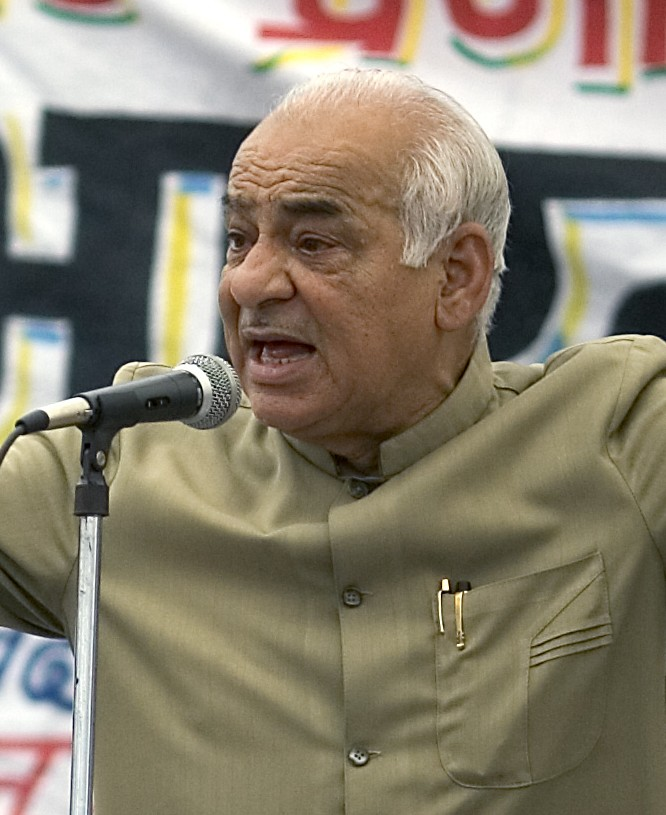
- Madan Lal Khurana
- Date formed: 2 December 1993
- Date dissolved: 26 February 1996

People and organisations
- Head of state: Lt Governor Vijai Kapoor
- Head of government: Madan Lal Khurana
- Member parties: Bharatiya Janata Party
- Status in legislature: Majority

History
- Election: 1993
- Successor: Sahib Singh Verma ministry

The Khurana cabinet was the Council of Ministers in first Delhi Legislative Assembly headed by Chief Minister Madan Lal Khurana.

== Council of Ministers (2 December 1993 – 26 February 1996) ==
Portfolio	Minister	Took office	Left office	Party
Chief Minister	Madan Lal Khurana	2 December 1993	26 February 1996	BJP
Health, Education, Law & Justice & Legislative Affairs minister	Harsh Vardhan	2 December 1993	26 February 1996	BJP
Welfare, Labour, Tourism and Employment	Sahib Singh Verma	2 December 1993	26 February 1996	BJP
Minister of Development	Lal Bihari Tiwari	2 December 1993	26 February 1996	BJP
Industry, Labour, Jails, Languages and Gurudwara Administration	Harsharan Singh Balli	2 December 1993	26 February 1996	BJP

Source: Harsh Vardhan; Sahib Singh Verma
