= Haroon Yusuf =

Indian politician

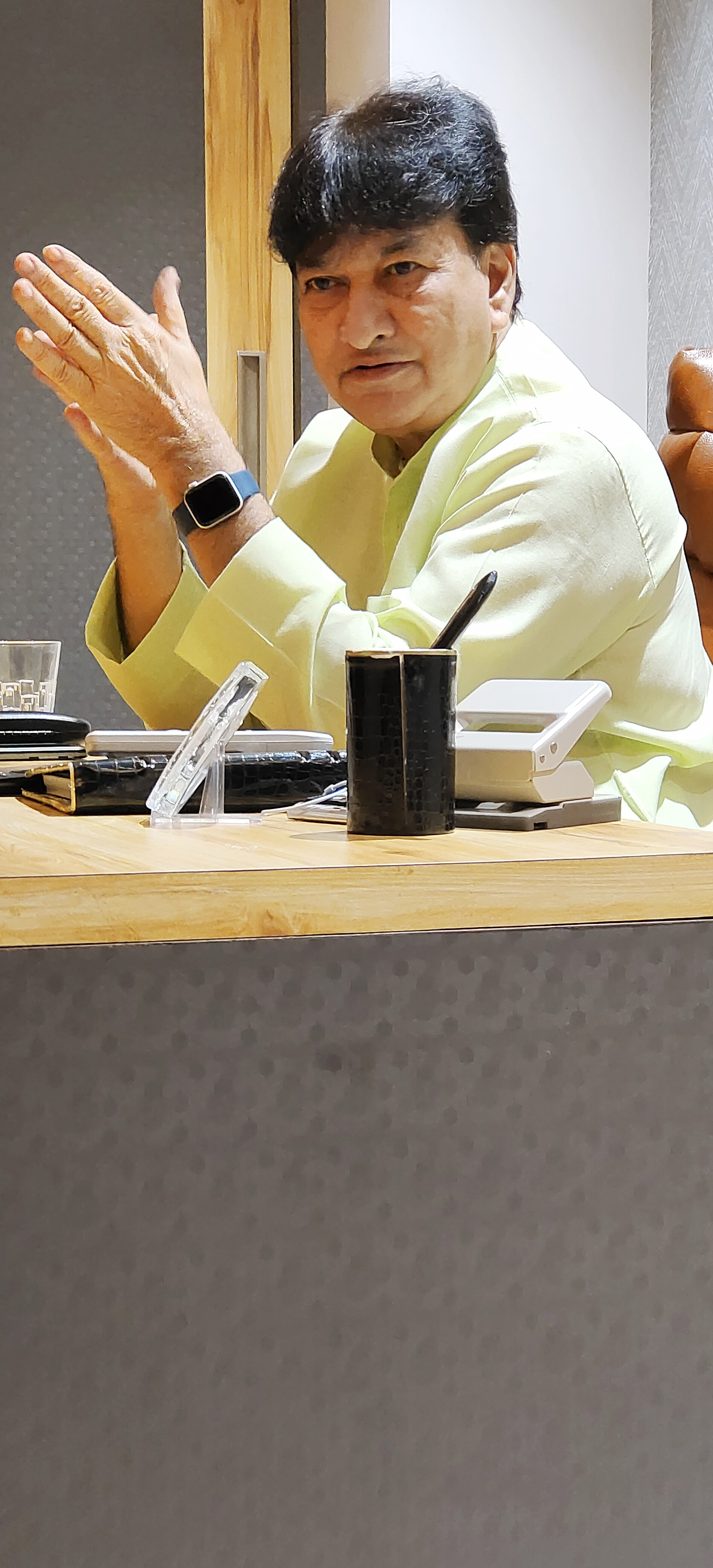

Cabinet Minister, Government of Delhi
- In office 2008–2013
- Lieutenant Governor: Tejendra Khanna; Najeeb Jung
- Chief Minister: Sheila Dikshit
- Ministry and Departments: Food; Civil Supplies; Industries
- In office 2003–2008
- Lieutenant Governor: Tejendra Khanna; Banwari Lal Joshi
- Chief Minister: Sheila Dikshit
- Ministry and Departments: Power; Transport
- In office 2001–2003
- Lieutenant Governor: Vijai Kapoor
- Chief Minister: Sheila Dikshit
- Ministry and Departments: Revenue; Development; Irrigation; Flood Control; Food & Civil Supplies

Member of the Delhi Legislative Assembly
- In office 1993–2015
- Preceded by: Constituency established
- Succeeded by: Imran Hussain, AAP
- Constituency: Ballimaran

Personal details
- Born: 6 March 1958 (age 68) Delhi, India
- Party: Indian National Congress
- Spouse: Bushra Haroon
- Children: 3
- Education: Zakir Husain Delhi College, University of Delhi

Haroon Yusuf (born 6 March 1958) is an Indian politician from the Indian National Congress (INC). He served as the Minister of Food & Civil Supplies Department and Industries Department in the Government of Delhi of the INC, headed by Sheila Dikshit. He also served as the working president of the Delhi Congress.

== Early life and education ==
Yusuf was born on 6 March 1958 in Delhi to Mohd. Yusuf. He pursued M.Com. from Zakir Husain Delhi College, University of Delhi. In 1988, he was elected as the secretary of Delhi Pradesh Youth Congress and took the charge of chairman, Anti-Narcotic Cell, All India Youth Congress Wing and in 1989 he was appointed joint secretary of All India Youth Congress Wing.

== Political career ==
He was elected to the Delhi Legislative Assembly for the first time in 1993 from Ballimaran and since then had been elected in every assembly elections from the same constituency till 2015. In 2013 Delhi Legislative Assembly election, he was elected for the fifth time from Ballimaran constituency. He is the first elected Chairman of Delhi Waqf Board (1999–2004).

- In 2001, he became Minister of Development, Revenue, Irrigation & Flood Control and Food & Supplies Department in Delhi government.
- In 2003, he was the Minister of Power & Transport.
- In 2008, he took the position of Minister of Food & Civil Supplies and Industries Department.

In 2015 Delhi Legislative Assembly election, for the first time, he lost the election to Imran Hussain of the Aam Aadmi Party by 43,913 votes.

Then again in 2020 Delhi Legislative Assembly election, for the second time, he lost the same seat to Imran Hussain (Indian politician) of the Aam Aadmi Party by 60,842 votes.

== Positions held ==
Year	Description
1993	Elected to 1st Delhi Assembly: Member, Committee on Library (1994–1996); Member, Committee on Question & Reference (1996–1999)
1998	Elected to 2nd Delhi Assembly (2nd term): Chairman, Public Accounts Committee (1999–2002); Member, Committee on Assembly Rules (1999–2002); Member, Committee on Library (1999–2002)
2003	Elected to 3rd Delhi Assembly (3rd term): Cabinet Minister, Power and Transport (2003–2008)
2008	Elected to 4th Delhi Assembly (4th term): Cabinet Minister, Food & Civil Supplies and Industries (2008–2013)
2013	Elected to 5th Delhi Assembly (5th term)
