= Second Dikshit ministry =

- 7th Ministry of Delhi
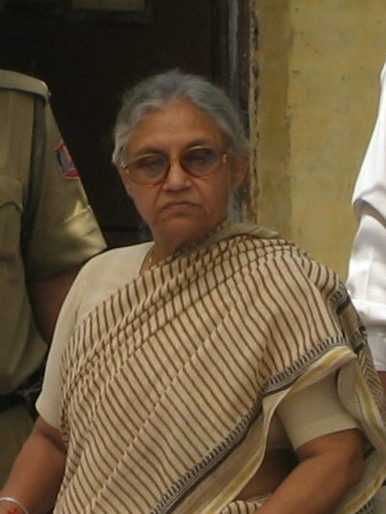
- Date formed: 15 December 2003

People and organisations
- Head of state: Lt Governor Vijai Kapoor
- Head of government: Sheila Dikshit
- Member parties: Indian National Congress
- Status in legislature: Majority

History
- Election: 2003
- Legislature term: 5 years
- Predecessor: First Dikshit ministry
- Successor: Third Dikshit ministry

The Second Dikshit cabinet was the Council of Ministers in third Delhi Legislative Assembly headed by Chief Minister Sheila Dikshit.

== Council of Ministers ==
Portfolio	Minister	Took office	Left office	Party
Chief Minister	Sheila Dikshit	15 December 2003	17 December 2008	INC
Minister for Health, Urban Development, Land & Building	Ashok Kumar Walia	15 December 2003	17 December 2008	INC
Minister of Power & Transport	Haroon Yusuf	2003	2008	INC
Education, Urban Development & Revenue, Transport, Languages, Tourism, Gurudwara Election, Local Bodies & Gurudwara Administration	Arvinder Singh Lovely	15 December 2003	17 December 2008	INC
Cabinet Minister for Health and Social Welfare	Yoganand Shastri	15 December 2003	17 December 2008	INC
Minister of Development, Revenue, Irrigation & Flood Control Department, Public Works Department, SC/ST Welfare Department	Raj Kumar Chauhan	15 December 2003	17 December 2008	INC
Minister of Industry, Land, Social Welfare, Labour & Employment, Law Justice & Legislative Affairs and Elections	Mangat Ram Singhal	15 December 2003	17 December 2008	INC
