= Third Dikshit ministry =

Government of Dehli, India from 2008 to 2013

- 8th Ministry of Delhi
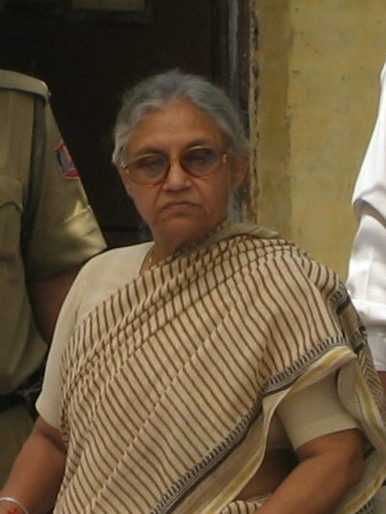
- Date formed: 17 December 2008

People and organisations
- Head of state: Lt Governor Tejendra Khanna
- Head of government: Sheila Dikshit
- Member parties: Indian National Congress
- Status in legislature: Majority

History
- Election: November 2008
- Legislature term: 5 years
- Predecessor: Second Dikshit ministry
- Successor: First Kejriwal ministry

The Third Dikshit cabinet was the Council of Ministers in fourth Delhi Legislative Assembly headed by Chief Minister Sheila Dikshit.

== Council of Ministers ==
Cabinet members
Portfolio	Minister	Took office	Left office	Party
Chief Minister	Sheila Dikshit	17 December 2008	27 December 2013	INC
Minister for Urban Development, Land & Building	Ashok Kumar Walia	17 December 2008	27 December 2013	INC
Minister for Health and Family welfare Department, Women & Child Development and languages	Kiran Walia	17 December 2008	27 December 2013	INC
Minister of Food & Civil Supplies and Industries	Haroon Yusuf	17 December 2008	27 December 2013	INC
Minister of Transport	Ramakant Goswami	17 December 2008	27 December 2013	INC
Education, Urban Development & Revenue, Transport, Languages, Tourism, Gurudwara Election, Local Bodies & Gurudwara Administration	Arvinder Singh Lovely	17 December 2008	27 December 2013	INC
Cabinet Minister for Health and Social Welfare	Yoganand Shastri	17 December 2008	27 December 2013	INC
Minister of Development, Revenue, Irrigation & Flood Control, Public Works, SC/ST Welfare	Raj Kumar Chauhan	17 December 2008	27 December 2013	INC
Minister of Industry, Land, Social Welfare, Labour & Employment, Law Justice & Legislative Affairs and Elections	Mangat Ram Singhal	17 December 2008	27 December 2013	INC

== Former members ==
№.	Name (Constituency)	Departments		Tenure	Reason	Party
1.	Mangat Ram Singhal; Cabinet Minister (Adarsh Nagar)	Social Welfare; Labour; Employment; Law	Justice; Legislative Affairs; Election	17 December 2008 - 16 February 2011	Removed	INC
