= Ballimaran Assembly constituency =

Constituency of the Delhi legislative assembly in India

Coordinates: 28.652°N 77.228°E

Ballimaran
- Constituency No. 22 for the Delhi Legislative Assembly

Constituency details
- Country: India
- Region: North India
- State: Delhi
- District: Chandni Chowk
- Lok Sabha constituency: Chandni Chowk
- Total electors: 1,41,844
- Reservation: None

Member of Legislative Assembly
- 8th Delhi Legislative Assembly
- Incumbent Imran Hussain
- Party: Aam Aadmi Party
- Elected year: 2025

Ballimaran Assembly constituency is one of the 70 legislative assembly constituencies of Delhi in northern India. The Ballimaran constituency was reorganized by delimitation commission in 2008. It is part of Chandni Chowk Lok Sabha constituency.

== Members of the Legislative Assembly ==
Year	Member	Party
1993	Haroon Yusuf	Indian National Congress
1998	Haroon Yusuf	Indian National Congress
2003	Haroon Yusuf	Indian National Congress
2008	Haroon Yusuf	Indian National Congress
2013	Haroon Yusuf	Indian National Congress
2015	Imran Hussain	Aam Aadmi Party
2020	Imran Hussain	Aam Aadmi Party
2025	Imran Hussain	Aam Aadmi Party

== Election results ==
=== 2025 ===
Delhi Assembly elections, 2025: Ballimaran
Party	Candidate	Votes	%	±%
AAP	Imran Hussain	57,004	58	
BJP	Kamal Bagri	27,181	27.66	
INC	Haroon Yusuf	13,059	13.29	
NCP	Mohammed Haroon	38	0.04	
BSP	Sonu Kumar	190	0.19	
Aam Aadmi Parivartan Party	Abrar	224	0.23	
NOTA	None of the above	301	0.31	
Majority		29,823	30.34	
Turnout		98,277		
		Swing		

=== 2020 ===
Delhi Assembly elections, 2020: Ballimaran
Party	Candidate	Votes	%	±%
AAP	Imran Hussain	65,644	64.65	+4.94
BJP	Lata	29,472	29.03	+4.73
INC	Haroon Yusuf	4,802	4.73	−9.07
BRD	Krishan Kumar	340	0.33	N/A
NOTA	None of the above	340	0.33	+0.01
Majority		36,172	35.62	+0.21
Turnout		1,01,548	71.64	+3.69
Registered electors		1,41,844		
AAP hold		Swing	+4.94	

=== 2015 ===
Delhi Assembly elections, 2015: Ballimaran
Party	Candidate	Votes	%	±%
AAP	Imran Hussain	57,118	59.71	+44.95
BJP	Shyam Lal Morwal	23,241	24.29	−2.77
INC	Haroon Yusuf	13,205	13.80	−22.38
BSP	Dilip Kumar	438	0.45	−17.88
RPI(A)	Mohd. Danish	130	0.14	+0.08
NOTA	None of the above	304	0.31	−0.12
Majority		33,877	35.42	+26.30
Turnout		95,663	67.95	
Registered electors		1,40,776		
AAP gain from INC		Swing	+33.76	

=== 2013 ===
Delhi Assembly elections, 2013: Ballimaran
Party	Candidate	Votes	%	±%
INC	Haroon Yusuf	32,105	36.18	−5.90
BJP	Moti Lal Sodhi	24,012	27.06	−7.45
BSP	Imran Hussain	16,267	18.33	+5.79
AAP	Farhana Anjum	13,103	14.76	
LJP	Vijay Kumar	1,036	1.17	−6.71
NOTA	None	385	0.43	
Majority		8,093	9.12	+1.55
Turnout		88,771	67.47	
INC hold		Swing	-5.90	

=== 2008 ===
Delhi Assembly elections, 2008: Ballimaran
Party	Candidate	Votes	%	±%
INC	Haroon Yusuf	34,660	42.08	
BJP	Moti Lal Sodhi	28,423	34.51	
BSP	Mushrafin	10,331	12.54	
LJP	Ubead Iqbal	6,490	7.88	
RJD	Md Sabauddin	810	0.98	
Independent	Waseem Qureshi	408	0.50	
ABHM	Ajay Kumar	373	0.45	
AIMF	Noor Jahan	159	0.19	
SP	Rajender Kumar	156	0.19	
Independent	Rakesh Kumar	150	0.18	
Independent	Mohd Abdullah	140	0.17	
MBP	Shafiq Khan	138	0.17	
IJP	Faiemuddin	126	0.15	
Majority		6,237	7.57	
Turnout		82,364	59.6	
INC hold		Swing		

== See also ==
- First Legislative Assembly of Delhi
- Second Legislative Assembly of Delhi
- Third Legislative Assembly of Delhi
- Fourth Legislative Assembly of Delhi
- Fifth Legislative Assembly of Delhi
- Sixth Legislative Assembly of Delhi
