= First Dikshit ministry =

- 6th Ministry of Delhi
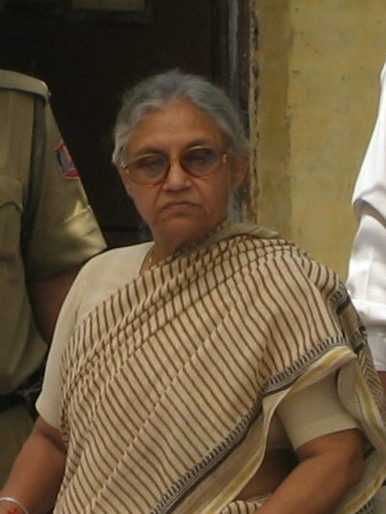
- Date formed: 3 December 1998
- Date dissolved: 1 December 2003

People and organisations
- Head of state: Lt Governor Vijai Kapoor
- Head of government: Sheila Dikshit
- Member parties: Indian National Congress
- Status in legislature: Majority

History
- Election: 1998
- Legislature term: 5 years
- Predecessor: Swaraj ministry
- Successor: Second Dikshit ministry

The First Dikshit cabinet was the Council of Ministers in second Delhi Legislative Assembly headed by Chief Minister Sheila Dikshit.

== Council of Ministers (3 December 1998 – 1 December 2003) ==
Portfolio	Minister	Took office	Left office	Party
Chief Minister	Sheila Dikshit	3 December 1998	1 December 2003	INC
Minister of Health, Urban Development, Environment, Forests & Wild Life	Ashok Kumar Walia	3 December 1998	1 December 2003	INC
Minister of Transport, Public Works Department, Land and Building, Delhi Metro	Parvez Hashmi	3 December 1998	1 December 2003	INC
Minister of Social Welfare, SC & ST, Labour & Employment	Krishna Tirath	3 December 1998	1 December 2003	INC
Minister of Education, Technical Education, Power, Tourism, Languages	Narendra Nath	3 December 1998	1 December 2003	INC
Minister of Finance	Mahinder Singh Saathi	3 December 1998	1 December 2003	INC
Minister for Development, Food and Civil Supplies	Yoganand Shastri	3 December 1998	1 December 2003	INC
