= Harsharan Singh Balli =

Indian politician

Harsharan Singh Balli (born 13 October 1948) is an Indian politician belonging to the BJP, who was the Minister for Industries in the Delhi state government of Madan Lal Khurana. He is the most powerful politician based in west Delhi.

H.S. Balli (Harsharan Singh Balli) can be described as a stalwart BJP leader and a son of a family of freedom fighters and the only Sikh in the history of Delhi who has been elected as the Member of Legislative Assembly 4 times consecutively and has been Member of Municipal Corporation of Delhi and served as a Minister under 3 Chief Ministers in Delhi namely Madan Lal Khurana, Late Sahib Singh Verma and late Sushma Swaraj. Also he was the Chairman of the Assurance Committee for 6 years. Since the first legislative assembly he has been the dominant winner in the polls and has been the MLA for 20 years from 1993 to 2013. He was also the founder of BJP Sikh cell. He is a member of the Steering Committee of World Punjabi Organisation (WPO).

== Serving Experience ==
- Member Municipal Corporation Of Delhi (M.C.D.) – 1977
- Elected, Member of Delhi Legislative Assembly (M.L.A.), 1993
- Elected, Member of Delhi Legislative Assembly (M.L.A.), 1998
- Elected, Member of Delhi Legislative Assembly (M.L.A.), 2003
- Elected, Member of Delhi Legislative Assembly (M.L.A.), 2008
- Member of the Steering Committee of World Punjabi Organisation (WPO)
- Appointed Minister (1993-1998) for Industry, Labour, Jails, Languages and Gurudwara Administration.
- Appointed the Leader of the Suicide squad when Bharatiya Janta Party decided to host the National Flag at Lal Chowk, Srinagar where he remained hidden at the flag hoisting site at Lal Chowk for 5 Days to hoist the Indian National Flag in case Sh. Murli Manohar Joshi ji got arrested. Afterwards, he was directed by Sh. J.P. Naddha, now a Central Minister in Prime Minister Modi's Cabinet, to hold on and not to do anything as government has agreed to permit Sh. Murli Manohar Joshi ji to hoist the flag. This was done under the supervision of Sh. Indresh ji, the then pracharak of Jammu and Kashmir.
- Assigned the duty to hold a convention of Sikhs by Sh. Singhal ji, president of VHP, at Ram Mandir, Ayodhya and have an Akhand Path for 3 days outside the premises of the structure known as Babri Masjid and to lay the foundation stone of ‘Thada" of "Ram Mandir, Ayodhya" which was done successfully by Sikh Panj Pyaras. This event was published and covered by all forms of media extensively, nationwide.
- Appointed Chairman, Assurance committee for consecutive 6 years.
- Served as Chairman of ESI Regional Board for 5 years.
- Served as Chairman of Khadi Gramudyog Board for 5 years.
- Imprisoned in 1984 for 46 days for protesting against Golden Temple Attack, Operation Blue Star
- Arrested in Ayodhya near Ram Mandir with 101 Sikh volunteers.
- In the year 1992, he was jailed for 16 days in Ram Mandir Andolan, arrested from 11 Ashoka Road, Bhartiya Janta Party, Head Office, New Delhi.
- Arrested for protesting against and breaking the sealing in Delhi, remaining 46 days in Tihar Jail, New Delhi,
- Again arrested from Moti Nagar by Moti Nagar police station regarding the sealing protest, remaining 16 days in custody.
- Supreme Court order for imprisonment for 3 months in Tihar Jail for contempt of court, the highest ever sentence in the history of Supreme Court to any political person. Irony is he has remained the Minister for Jails and Administrative Reforms back in the day.
- In 1978, he went on a Fast until death (Hunger Strike) against sealing of DDA shops outside Vikas sadan.
- In 1999, he went on indefinite fast up to death (Hunger Strike) which lasted for 4 days against irregular water supply in his constituency (Hari Nagar Vidhan Sabha).
- He went on another major indefinite Hunger Strike against the demolition of unauthorized construction which stretched for 10 days and he remained on fast even after his arrest, until the government agreed to regularize 4 storeys in Delhi.

== Past Party Serving Experience ==
- 2 times Mr. H. S. Balli served as the Vice President, Delhi Pradesh BJP
- Remained Vice President of BJP Delhi with Shri Madan Lal Khurana (ex- Chief Minister, Delhi) as the President.
- Served as Vice President of BJP Delhi with Dr. Harsh Vardhan (Delhi politician) as President.
- Member of Election Committee, 1994- 1998
- Member of Election Committee, 2003
- Member of Election Committee, 2007
- Member of Election Committee, 2011
- Founder of the BJP Sikh cell
- Currently an Invited Member BJP Delhi Pradesh, Executive Committee.

== Important Cases ==
- Contempt of Court, Supreme Court of India, in the sealing case
- Locking of Zonal Office of M.C.D., Rajouri Garden, Tis Hazari Court
- Complaint of Sub Division Magistrate (SDM), Naraina for rebel revolt against the Sealing of Industries, Patiala House Court
- Breaking of Section 144 for protesting in front of Pakistan Embassy.

(Mr. Harsharan Singh Balli fought all his cases on his own without appointing any lawyers for the proceedings. Mr. Arun Jaitley is an Indian politician and lawyer who is the current Finance Minister and Minister of Corporate Affairs in the BJP Government under Prime Minister Narendra Modi's ministry, used to be present in Balli's hearing in the High Court for case study and observations).

On 11 April 2007, the Supreme Court of India sentenced Balli to three months in jail after he confessed that last year he had indeed broken the seals of 22 shops, which were sealed on the court's orders in west Delhi.

== Member of Legislative Assembly ==
Key

BJP

Election	Member	Party
1993	Harsharan Singh Balli	Bharatiya Janata Party
1998	Harsharan Singh Balli	Bharatiya Janata Party
2003	Harsharan Singh Balli	Bharatiya Janata Party
2008	Harsharan Singh Balli	Bharatiya Janata Party
