= Simply Blood =

Indian blood donation platform

Simply Blood is an online blood donation platform. It uses a website and mobile application to connect blood donors and recipients.

Founded by Kiran Verma, Delhi, India in 2016 along with five college passouts from Ambala District, Haryana launched Simply Blood app on January 29, 2017, in Delhi. The founder of the platform is a school dropout and other were all software engineers passed out from the same college. Simply Blood was founded to curb black marketing of blood in India.

Simply Blood's mobile app only exists for Android devices. The second version of the app was released by Vijay Goel, former Minister of Youth Affairs and Sports in India, on September 23, 2017.

Simply Blood has a realtime GPS enabled application which allows a person to raise a blood request without sharing the contact details in public. Blood donors can see all the nearby blood requests near his/her current location to accept the blood request. After accepting the blood request the donor and requester will get each other's number in less than few seconds. Blood donors who wanted to donate blood on some specific date can register themselves and select a suitable date
