= 1st Delhi Assembly =

Legislature of Delhi, India, 1993–1998

Legislative Assembly of Delhi

Overview
- Meeting place: Old Secretariat, Delhi, India
- Website: www.delhiassembly.nic.in

The First Legislative Assembly of Delhi was constituted in November 1993 after the Council of Ministers was replaced by the Delhi Legislative Assembly through the Constitution Act 1991 and by the Government of National Capital Territory of Delhi Act, 1991, the 69th Amendment to the Indian constitution. The amendment declared the Union Territory of Delhi to be formally known as National Capital Territory of Delhi, subsequently Delhi holding the 1st state elections.

In all, six national parties, three state parties, 41 registered (unrecognised) parties and other independent candidates contested for 70 assembly seats. With 49 seats, BJP got the majority and formed the government.

== Electors ==
	Male	Female	Others	Total
Electors	3,237,048	2,613,497	-	5,850,645
Electors who voted	2,089,763	1,522,950	-	3,612,713
Polling percentage	64.56%	58.27%	-	61.75%

== Candidates ==
	Male	Female	Others	Total
Candidates	1,257	59	-	1,316
Elected	67	3	-	70
Forfeited deposits	1,109	46	-	1,155

== Important members ==
#	From	To	Position	Name	Party
1	1993	1996	Chief Minister	Madan Lal Khurana	BJP
2	1996	1998	Chief Minister	Sahib Singh Verma	BJP
3	1998	1998	Chief Minister	Sushma Swaraj	BJP
4	1993	1998	Speaker	Charti Lal Goel	BJP
5	1993	1998	Deputy Speaker	n/a	n/a
6	1993	1998	Leader of the House	n/a	n/a
7	1993	1998	Leader of the Opposition	n/a	n/a

== List of members ==
#	Constituency	Name	Party
1	Sarojini Nagar	Ram Bhaj	BJP
2	Gole Market	Kirti Azad	BJP
3	Minto Road	Tajdar Babar	INC
4	Kasturba Nagar	Jagdish Lal Batra	BJP
5	Jangpura	Jag Parvesh Chandra	INC
6	Okhla	Parvez Hashmi	JD
7	Kalkaji	Purnima Sethi	BJP
8	Malviya Nagar	Rajendra Gupta	BJP
9	Hauz Khas	Rajesh Sharma	BJP
10	R. K. Puram	Bodh Raj	BJP
11	Delhi Cantonment	Karan Singh Tanwar	BJP
12	Janakpuri	Jagdish Mukhi	BJP
13	Hari Nagar	Harsharan Singh Balli	BJP
14	Tilak Nagar	O.P Babbar	BJP
15	Rajouri Garden	Ajay Maken	INC
16	Madipur (SC)	Swarup Chand Rajan	BJP
17	Tri Nagar	Nand Kishore Garg	BJP
18	Shakur Basti	Gauri Shankar Bhardwaj	BJP
19	Shalimar Bagh	Sahib Singh Verma	BJP
20	Badli	Jai Bhagwan Aggarwal	BJP
21	Sahibabad Daulatpur	Jet Ram Solanki	BJP
22	Bawana (SC)	Chand Ram	BJP
23	Sultan Pur Majra (SC)	Jai Kishan	INC
24	Mangol Puri (SC)	Raj Kumar Chauhan	INC
25	Nangloi Jat	Devender Singh Shokeen	BJP
26	Vishnu Garden	Mahinder Singh Saathi	INC
27	Hastsal	Mukesh Sharma	INC
28	Najafgarh	Suraj Parshad	IND
29	Nasirpur	Vinod Kumar Sharma	BJP
30	Palam	Dharam Dev Solanki	BJP
31	Mahipalpur	Sat Parkash Rana	BJP
32	Mehrauli	Brahm Singh Tanwar	BJP
33	Saket	Tek Chand	INC
34	Ambedkar Nagar (SC)	Prem Singh	INC
35	Tughlakabad	Shish Pal	IND
36	Badarpur	Ramvir Singh Bidhuri	JD
37	Trilokpuri (SC)	Brahm Pal	INC
38	Patparganj (SC)	Gyan Chand	BJP
39	Mandawali	M.S. Panwar	BJP
40	Geeta Colony	Ashok Kumar Walia	INC
41	Gandhi Nagar	Darshan Kumar Bahl	BJP
42	Krishna Nagar	Harsh Vardhan	BJP
43	Vishwas Nagar	Madan Lal Gawa	BJP
44	Shahdara	Ram Niwas Goel	BJP
45	Seemapuri (SC)	Balbir Singh	BJP
46	Nand Nagari (SC)	Fateh Singh	BJP
47	Rohtas Nagar	Alok Kumar	BJP
48	Babarpur	Naresh Gaur	BJP
49	Seelampur	Mateen Ahmed	JD
50	Ghonda	Lal Bihari Tiwari	BJP
51	Yamuna Vihar	Sahab Singh Chauhan	BJP
52	Qarawal Nagar	Ram Pal	BJP
53	Wazirpur	Deep Chand Bandhu	INC
54	Narela (SC)	Inder Raj Singh	BJP
55	Bhalswa Jahangirpur	Jitendra Kumar	IND
56	Adarsh Nagar	Jai Parkash Yadav	BJP
57	Pahar Ganj	Satish Khandelwal	BJP
58	Matia Mahal	Shoaib Iqbal	JD
59	Ballimaran	Haroon Yusuf	INC
60	Chandni Chowk	Vasdev Kaptain	BJP
61	Timarpur	Rajender Gupta	BJP
62	Model Town	Chatri Lal Goel	BJP
63	Kamla Nagar	P.K. Chandla	BJP
64	Sadar Bazar	Hari Krishan	BJP
65	Moti Nagar	Madan Lal Khurana	BJP
66	Patel Nagar	M.R Arya	BJP
67	Rajinder Nagar	Puran Chand Yogi	BJP
68	Karol Bagh (SC)	Surender Pal Ratawal	BJP
69	Ram Nagar (SC)	Moti Lal Soddi	BJP
70	Baljit Nagar (SC)	Krishna Tirath	INC
