= Chief Minister of Delhi =

Leader of the executive branch of National Capital Territory of Delhi

Chief Minister of National Capital Territory of Delhi
- Emblem of the NCT of Delhi

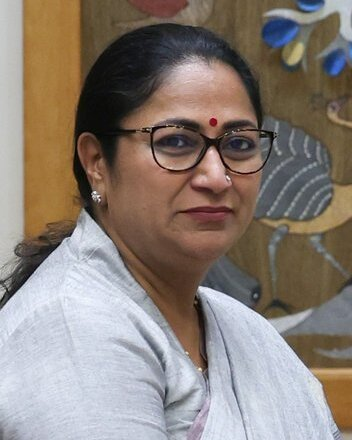
- Incumbent; Rekha Gupta since 20 February 2025
- Chief Minister's Office; Government of Delhi
- Style: The Honourable; Her Excellency
- Type: Head of government
- Status: Leader of the Executive
- Member of: State cabinet; Legislative Assembly
- Reports to: Lieutenant Governor of Delhi; Delhi Legislative Assembly
- Residence: 6, Flagstaff Road, Civil Lines, Delhi
- Seat: Old Secretariat, Vikram Nagar, Civil Lines, Delhi
- Nominator: MLAs of the majority party or alliance
- Appointer: Lt. Governor of Delhi by convention based on appointees ability to command confidence in the Delhi Legislative Assembly
- Term length: At the confidence of the assembly; Chief minister's term is for five years and is subject to no term limits.
- Inaugural holder: Brahm Prakash
- Formation: First formation: 17 March 1952; 74 years ago – 1 November 1956; 69 years ago; dissolved in between 1 November 1956; 69 years ago – 1 December 1993; 32 years ago; Reintroduction: 1 December 1993; 32 years ago
- Deputy: Deputy Chief Minister of Delhi
- Salary: ₹390,000 (US$4,100)
- Website: Official website

The chief minister of the National Capital Territory of Delhi is the head of government of the National Capital Territory of Delhi. According to the Constitution of India, the lieutenant governor is the National Capital Territory of Delhi's de jure head, but de facto executive authority rests with its chief minister. Following elections to the Delhi Legislative Assembly, the lieutenant governor usually invites the party with a majority of seats to form the government. The president of India, on the advice of the lieutenant governor, appoints the chief minister, whose council of ministers are collectively responsible to the assembly. Given that the person has the confidence of the assembly, the chief minister's term is for five years and is subject to no term limits. Rekha Gupta is the incumbent chief minister since February 2025.

== History ==
Since 1952, the National Capital Territory of Delhi has had 7 chief ministers, starting with the Indian National Congress party's Chaudhary Brahm Prakash. The office of the chief minister was abolished for 37 years after the States Reorganisation Act of 1956. In 1991, the 69th Amendment to the Indian Constitution granted Delhi National Capital Territory (NCT) status and an elected legislature.

The first election after 37 years was held in November 1993 and Madan Lal Khurana of Bharatiya Janata Party was sworn in as the chief minister. The longest-serving chief minister, Sheila Dikshit from the Indian National Congress party, held the office for over fifteen years.

On 28 December 2013, Arvind Kejriwal of Aam Aadmi Party sworn in as first state party chief minister of the national capital territory. There has been one instance of president's rule in the National Capital Territory of Delhi, most recently in 2015.

== Official residence ==
Since 2014, the Chief Minister has resided at Bungalow 6 at Flagstaff Road in North Delhi. The location is close to the Delhi Secretariat.

== Chief ministers of Delhi (1952-present) ==
No (Note: A parenthetical number indicates that the incumbent has previously held office.)	Portrait	Name (Birth-Death)	Constituency	Term of office			Assembly (election)	Party (Note: This column only names the chief minister's party. The state government he headed may have been a complex coalition of several parties and independents; these are not listed here.)
1		Brahm Prakash (1918–1993)	Nangloi Jat	17 March 1952	12 February 1955	2 years, 332 days	Interim (1952)	Indian National Congress
2		Gurmukh Nihal Singh (1885–1969)	Daryaganj	12 February 1955	1 November 1956	1 year, 263 days	Interim (1952)	Indian National Congress
Office abolished (1 November 1956 – 1 December 1993) (Note: As after that States Reorganisation Act, 1956 was passed which made Delhi a Union Territory. Thus, no one was appointed the next CM of Delhi until legislative assembly elections in Delhi were held in 1993, when Union Territory of Delhi was formally declared as National Capital Territory of Delhi by the Sixty-ninth Amendment to the Indian constitution and formed Delhi Metropolitan Council.)
3		Madan Lal Khurana (1936–2018)	Moti Nagar	2 December 1993	26 February 1996	2 years, 86 days	1st (1993)	Bharatiya Janata Party
4		Sahib Singh Verma (1943–2007)	Shalimar Bagh	26 February 1996	12 October 1998	2 years, 228 days	1st (1993)	Bharatiya Janata Party
5		Sushma Swaraj (1952–2019)	Not Contested	12 October 1998	3 December 1998	52 days	1st (1993)	Bharatiya Janata Party
6		Sheila Dikshit (1938–2019)	New Delhi	3 December 1998	2 December 2003	15 years, 25 days	2nd (1998)	Indian National Congress
6		Sheila Dikshit (1938–2019)	New Delhi	2 December 2003	30 November 2008	15 years, 25 days	3rd (2003)	Indian National Congress
6		Sheila Dikshit (1938–2019)	New Delhi	30 November 2008	28 December 2013	15 years, 25 days	4th (2008)	Indian National Congress
7		Arvind Kejriwal (b.1968)	New Delhi	28 December 2013	14 February 2014	48 days	5th (2013)	Aam Aadmi Party
–		Vacant (President's rule)	–	14 February 2014	14 February 2015	1 year, 0 days	Dissolved	–
(7)		Arvind Kejriwal (b.1968)	New Delhi	14 February 2015	16 February 2020	9 years, 218 days	6th (2015)	Aam Aadmi Party
(7)		Arvind Kejriwal (b.1968)	New Delhi	16 February 2020	21 September 2024	9 years, 218 days	7th (2020)	Aam Aadmi Party
8		Atishi Marlena (b.1981)	Kalkaji	21 September 2024	20 February 2025	152 days	7th (2020)	Aam Aadmi Party
9		Rekha Gupta (b.1974)	Shalimar Bagh	20 February 2025	Incumbent	1 year, 253 days	8th (2025)	Bharatiya Janata Party

== Statistics ==
List of chief ministers by length of term

#	Name	Party	Length of term	
#	Name	Party	Longest tenure	Total tenure
1	Sheila Dikshit	INC	15 years, 25 days	15 years, 25 days
2	Arvind Kejriwal	AAP	9 years, 218 days	9 years, 266 days
3	Brahm Parkash	INC	2 years, 332 days	2 years, 332 days
4	Sahib Singh Verma	BJP	2 years, 228 days	2 years, 228 days
5	Madan Lal Khurana	BJP	2 years, 86 days	2 years, 86 days
6	Rekha Gupta	BJP	1 year, 253 days	1 year, 253 days
7	Gurmukh Nihal Singh	INC	1 year, 263 days	1 year, 263 days
8	Atishi Marlena	AAP	152 days	152 days
9	Sushma Swaraj	BJP	52 days	52 days

List by party

Political parties by total time-span of their member holding CMO (31 October 2026)
No.	Political party	Number of chief ministers	Total days of holding CMO
1	Indian National Congress	3	7194 days
2	Aam Aadmi Party	2	3707 days
3	Bharatiya Janata Party	4	2445 days

Parties by total duration (in days) of holding Chief Minister's Office

- INC
- AAP
- BJP

== Oath ==
“I, A.B., do swear in the name of God that I will bear true faith and allegiance to the Constitution of India as by law established, 1 [that I will uphold the sovereignty and integrity of India,] that I will faithfully and conscientiously discharge my duties as a Minister for the State of ..........and that I will do right to all manner of people in accordance with the Constitution and the law without fear or favour, affection or ill-will.”

== See also ==
- List of current Indian chief ministers
- List of lieutenant governors of the National Capital Territory of Delhi
- List of deputy chief ministers of the National Capital Territory of Delhi
