= List of lieutenant governors of Delhi =

Lieutenant Governor of NCT of Delhi

Lieutenant Governor of Delhi

- Flag of India

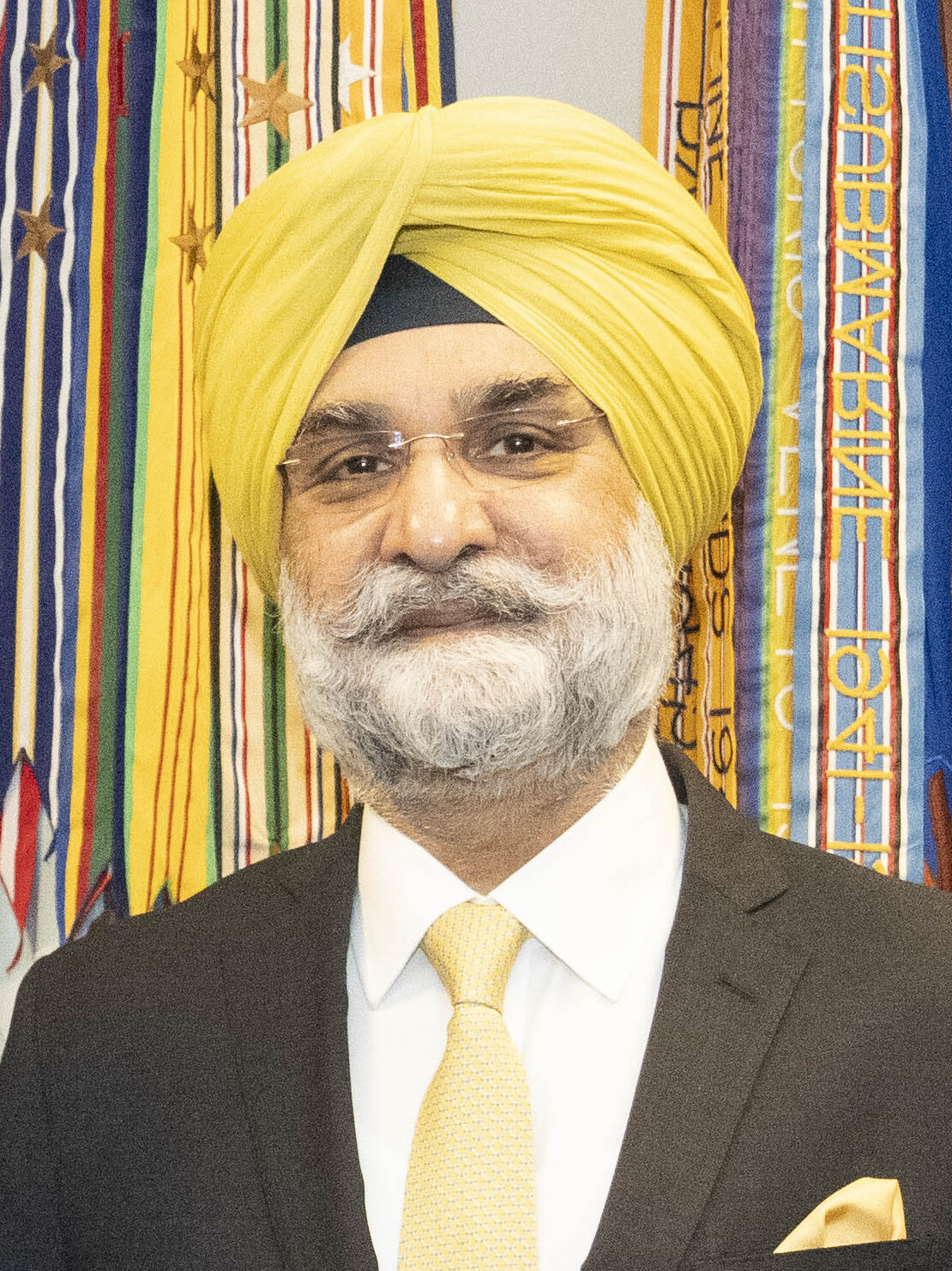
- Incumbent; Taranjit Singh Sandhu since 11 March 2026
- Style: The Honourable
- Type: Lieutenant Governor
- Status: Head of State
- Residence: Lok Niwas, Delhi
- Seat: Raj Niwas Marg, Ludlow Castle, Civil Lines, Delhi
- Appointer: President of India
- Term length: 5 years
- Precursor: Chief Commissioners of Delhi
- Inaugural holder: Aditya Nath Jha, ICS
- Formation: 7 November 1966; 59 years ago
- Website: delhi.gov.in

The Lieutenant Governor of Delhi is the constitutional head of the National Capital Territory of Delhi. The post was established in September 1966, following the enactment of The Delhi Administration Act, 1966. Thereafter, the former Delhi Legislative Assembly was replaced by the Delhi Metropolitan Council comprising 56 elected and 5 nominated members with the Lieutenant Governor of Delhi presiding as its head. The Council, however, had no legislative powers: it merely played an advisory role in the governance of Delhi. This setup sustained until 1990, when the Assembly was reinstated; the position of Lieutenant Governor retained its role.

The National Capital Territory of Delhi (Amendment) Bill, 2021 was introduced in the Parliament of India and was passed by both Lok Sabha and Rajya Sabha. The bill specifies that, in any law made by the Legislative Assembly, the term "Government" shall refer to the Lieutenant Governor.

The incumbent Lieutenant Governor of Delhi is Taranjit Singh Sandhu. Raj Niwas in Civil Lines, Delhi, serves as the Lieutenant Governor's official residence.

== Predecessor ==
=== Chief Commissioners ===
Delhi was previously headed by a Chief Commissioner who was an officer of the Imperial Civil Service.

#	Name	Portrait	Took office	Left office	Duration
1	Shankar Prasada, PPA		1948	1954	
2	Anand Dattahaya Pandit, ICS		1954	1959	
3	Bhagwan Sahay, ICS		1959	1963	
4	V. Viswanathan, ICS		1964	7 September 1966	
5	Aditya Nath Jha, ICS		7 September 1966	1 November 1966	

== Lieutenant governors (1966-present) ==
In 1966, the Delhi Administration Act was passed, which established the Delhi Metropolitan Council with the Lieutenant Governor of Delhi as its head. So far, there have been 21 individuals who have held this post, including 10 IAS officers, 4 ICS officers, 2 IPS officers, 2 senior IAF officers, and 2 IFS officers. The appointees have generally been retired, with the exception of Najeeb Jung, who resigned from service and Vinai Kumar Saxena who was transferred as the Lieutenant governor of Ladakh. List of Lieutenant Governors of Delhi

No.	Portrait	Name (born – died)	Took office	Left office	Duration
1		Aditya Nath Jha, ICS (1911–1972)	7 November 1966	19 January 1972	5 years, 73 days
2		M.C. Pimputkar, ICS	19 January 1972	23 April 1972	95 days
3		Baleshwar Prasad, IAS	24 April 1972	3 October 1974	2 years, 162 days
4		Krishan Chand, ICS	3 October 1974	30 March 1978	3 years, 178 days
5		Dalip Rai Kohli, ICS	30 March 1978	17 February 1980	1 year, 324 days
6		Jagmohan Malhotra, IAS (1927–2021)	17 February 1980	30 March 1981	1 year, 41 days
7		Sundar Lal Khurana, IAS (1918–2007)	30 March 1981	2 September 1982	1 year, 156 days
(6)		Jagmohan Malhotra, IAS (1927–2021)	2 September 1982	25 April 1984	1 year, 236 days
8		P. G. Gavai, IAS	25 April 1984	Nov 1984	
9		Mohan M.K. Wali, IAS	Nov 1984	Nov 1985	
10		AVM H. L. Kapur, PVSM, AVSM (1923–2020)	16 November 1985	3 August 1988	2 years, 261 days
11		Romesh Bhandari, IFS (1928–2013)	4 August 1988	11 December 1989	1 year, 129 days
12		MIAF Arjan Singh, DFC (1919–2017)	12 December 1989	December 1990	
13		Markandey Singh, IPS	Dec 1990	4 May 1992	
14		Prasannabhai Karunashankar Dave, IAS	4 May 1992	4 January 1997	4 years, 245 days
15		Tejendra Khanna, IAS (b.1938)	4 January 1997	20 April 1998	1 year, 106 days
16		Vijai Kapoor, IAS	20 April 1998	9 June 2004	6 years, 50 days
17		Banwari Lal Joshi, IPS (1936–2017)	9 June 2004	9 April 2007	2 years, 304 days
(15)		Tejendra Khanna, IAS (b.1938)	9 April 2007	9 July 2013	6 years, 91 days
18		Najeeb Jung, IAS (b.1951)	9 July 2013	22 December 2016	3 years, 166 days
19		Anil Baijal, IAS (b.1945)	31 December 2016	18 May 2022	5 years, 138 days
20		Vinai Kumar Saxena (b.1958)	26 May 2022	13 March 2026	3 years, 291 days
21		Taranjit Singh Sandhu, IFS (b.1963)	11 March 2026	Incumbent	216 days

== See also ==
- Government of Delhi
- Governors in India
- Union territory
- Chief Minister of Delhi
