= 2003 Delhi Legislative Assembly election =

2003 state assembly election in Delhi

- 1 December 2003

All 70 to the Delhi Legislative Assembly 36 seats needed for a majority
- Turnout: 53.42% (▲4.43%)
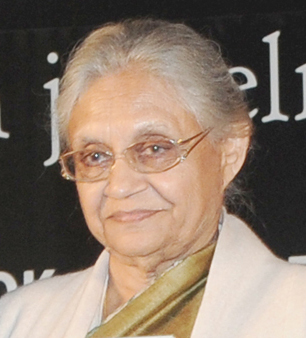

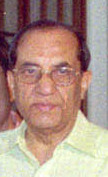

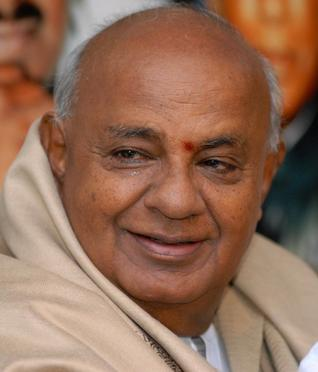
	First party	Second party
Leader	Sheila Dikshit	Vijay Kumar Malhotra
Party	INC	BJP
Leader's seat	Gole Market	Greater Kailash
Last election	52	15
Seats won	47	20
Seat change	▼5	▲5
Popular vote	2,172,062	1,589,323
Percentage	48.13%	35.22%
Swing	▲0.37%	▲1.2%
	Third party	Fourth party
Leader	Sharad Pawar	H. D. Deve Gowda
Party	NCP	JD(S)
Leader's seat	did not contest	did not contest
Last election	Party did not exist	Party did not exist
Seats won	1	1
Seat change	▲1	▲1
Percentage	2.24%	0.75%
Swing	▲2.24%	▲0.75
Chief Minister before election
Sheila Dikshit
INC
Elected Chief Minister
Sheila Dikshit
INC

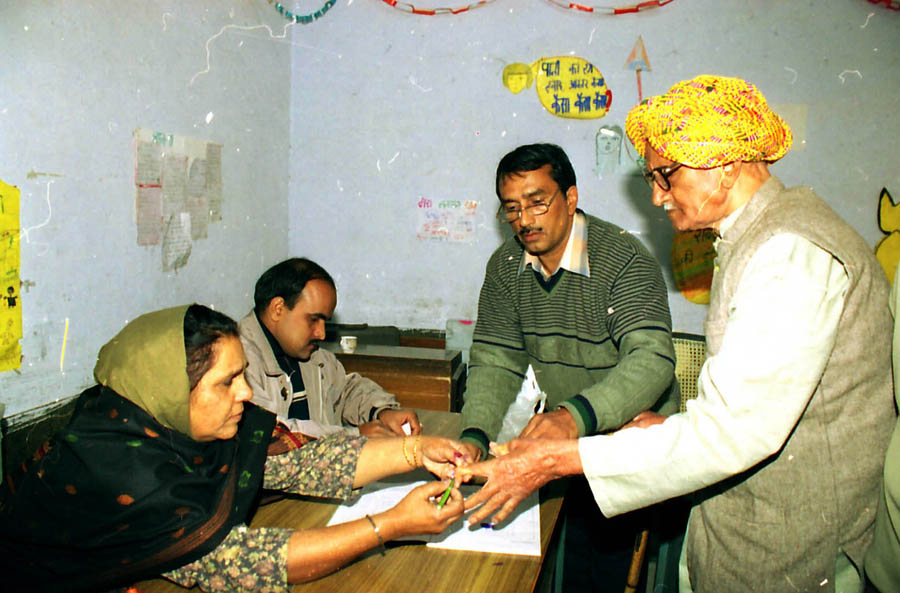
An old man at a Polling booth to cast his vote during Assembly Elections of Delhi on 1 December 2003 (Monday)

The Delhi state assembly elections 2003 were elections for the Legislative Assembly of Delhi held on 1 December 2003 with the results declared on 4 December. The Indian National Congress retained control of the Legislative Assembly. Of the 70 elected legislators 63 were men and 7 women.

== Parties and Alliances ==
Party	Flag	Symbol	Leader	Seats contested
Indian National Congress			Sheila Dikshit	70
Bharatiya Janata Party			Vijay Kumar Malhotra	70
Bahujan Samaj Party			Mayawati	40
Samajwadi Party			Mulayam Singh Yadav	39
Nationalist Congress Party			Sharad Pawar	33
Lok Jan Shakti Party			Ram Vilas Paswan	14
Janata Dal (Secular)			H. D. Deve Gowda	12
INDEPENDENTS				284

== Result ==
Party	Seats Contested	Seats won	Seats Changed	% Votes
Indian National Congress	70	47	▼5	48.13
Bharatiya Janata Party	70	20	▲5	35.22
Bahujan Samaj Party	40	0	Steady	5.76
Nationalist Congress Party	33	1	▲1	2.24
Janata Dal (Secular)	12	1	▲1	0.75
Independent	284	1	▼1	4.86
Total		70		96.96

== Elected members ==
Constituency	Reserved for (SC/ST/None)	Member	Party
Sarojini Nagar	None	Ashok Ahuja	Indian National Congress
Gole Market	None	Sheila Dikshit	Indian National Congress
Minto Road	None	Tajdar Babar	Indian National Congress
Kasturba Nagar	None	Sushil Choudhary	Bharatiya Janata Party
Jangpura	None	Tarvinder Singh Marwah	Indian National Congress
Okhla	None	Parvez Hashmi	Indian National Congress
Kalkaji	None	Subhash Chopra	Indian National Congress
Malviya Nagar	None	Dr. Yoganand Shastri	Indian National Congress
Hauz Khas	None	Kiran Walia	Indian National Congress
R. K. Puram	None	Ashok Singh	Indian National Congress
Delhi Cantonment	None	Karan Singh Tanwar	Bharatiya Janata Party
Janak Puri	None	Prof. Jagdish Mukhi	Bharatiya Janata Party
Hari Nagar	None	Harsharan Singh Balli	Bharatiya Janata Party
Tilak Nagar	None	OP Babbar	Bharatiya Janata Party
Rajouri Garden	None	Ajay Makan	Indian National Congress
Madipur	SC	Mala Ram Gangwal	Indian National Congress
Tri Nagar	None	Anil Bhardwaj	Indian National Congress
Shakurbasti	None	Dr. S.c. Vats	Indian National Congress
Shalimar Bagh	None	Ravinder Nath Bansal	Bharatiya Janata Party
Badli	None	Jai Bhagwan Aggarwal	Bharatiya Janata Party
Sahibabad Daulatpur	None	Kulwant Rana	Bharatiya Janata Party
Bawana	SC	Surender Kumar	Indian National Congress
Sultanpur Majra	SC	Sushila Devi	Indian National Congress
Mangolpuri	SC	Raj Kumar Chauhan	Indian National Congress
Nangloi Jat	None	Bijender Singh	Indian National Congress
Vishnu Garden	None	Dayanand Chandila	Bharatiya Janata Party
Hastsal	None	Mukesh Sharma	Indian National Congress
Najafgarh	None	Ranbir Singh	Indian National Congress
Nasirpur	None	Mahabal Mishra	Indian National Congress
Palam	None	Dharam Dev Solanki	Bharatiya Janata Party
Mahipalpur	None	Vijay Singh Lochav	Indian National Congress
Mehrauli	None	Bhram Singh Tanwar	Indian National Congress
Saket	None	Vijay Jolly	Bharatiya Janata Party
Dr. Ambedkar Nagar	SC	Ch. Prem Singh	Indian National Congress
Tuglakabad	None	Ramesh Bidhuri	Bharatiya Janata Party
Badarpur	None	Ramvir Singh Bidhuri	Nationalist Congress Party
Trilokpuri	SC	Brahm Pal	Indian National Congress
Patpar Ganj	SC	Amrish Singh Gautam	Indian National Congress
Mandawali	None	Meera Bhardwaj	Indian National Congress
Geeta Colony	None	Ashok Kumar Walia	Indian National Congress
Gandhi Nagar	None	Arvinder Singh Lovely	Indian National Congress
Krishna Nagar	None	Harsh Vardhan	Bharatiya Janata Party
Vishwash Nagar	None	Naseeb Singh	Indian National Congress
Shahdara	None	Narender Nath	Indian National Congress
Seemapuri	SC	Veer Singh	Indian National Congress
Nand Nagari	SC	Roop Chand	Indian National Congress
Rohtas Nagar	None	Ram Babu Sharma	Indian National Congress
Babarpur	None	Vinay Sharma	Indian National Congress
Seelampur	None	Ch. Mateen Ahmad	Indian National Congress
Ghonda	None	Bheeshm Sharma	Indian National Congress
Yamuna Vihar	None	Sahab Singh Chauhan	Bharatiya Janata Party
Qarawal Nagar	None	Mohan Singh Bisht	Bharatiya Janata Party
Wazirpur	None	Mange Ram Garg	Bharatiya Janata Party
Narela	SC	Charan Singh Kandera	Indian National Congress
Bhalswa Jahangirpur	None	J.s.chauhan	Indian National Congress
Adarsh Nagar	None	Mangat Ram	Indian National Congress
Pahar Ganj	None	Anjali Rai	Indian National Congress
Matia Mahal	None	Shoaib Iqbal	Janata Dal (Secular)
Balli Maran	None	Haroon Yusuf	Indian National Congress
Chandni Chowk	None	Prahlad Singh Sawhney	Indian National Congress
Timarpur	None	Surinder Pal Singh	Indian National Congress
Model Town	None	Kanwar Karan Singh	Indian National Congress
Kamla Nagar	None	Shadi Ram	Indian National Congress
Sadar Bazar	None	Rajesh Jain	Indian National Congress
Moti Nagar	None	Madan Lal Khurana	Bharatiya Janata Party
Patel Nagar	None	Rama Kant Goswami	Indian National Congress
Rajinder Nagar	None	Puran Chand Yogi	Bharatiya Janata Party
Karol Bagh	SC	Surender Pal Ratawal	Bharatiya Janata Party
Ram Nagar	SC	Moti Lal Sodhi	Bharatiya Janata Party
Baljit Nagar	SC	Krishna Tirath	Indian National Congress

== See also ==
- State Assembly elections in India, 2003
- First Legislative Assembly of Delhi
- Second Legislative Assembly of Delhi
- Third Legislative Assembly of Delhi
- Fourth Legislative Assembly of Delhi
- Fifth Legislative Assembly of Delhi
- Sixth Legislative Assembly of Delhi
