= 1998 Delhi Legislative Assembly election =

1998 state assembly election in Delhi

- 25 November 1998

All 70 seats in the Delhi Legislative Assembly 36 seats needed for a majority
- Turnout: 48.99% (▼12.76%)
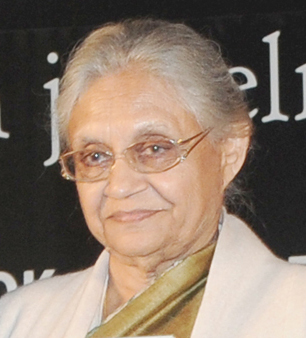

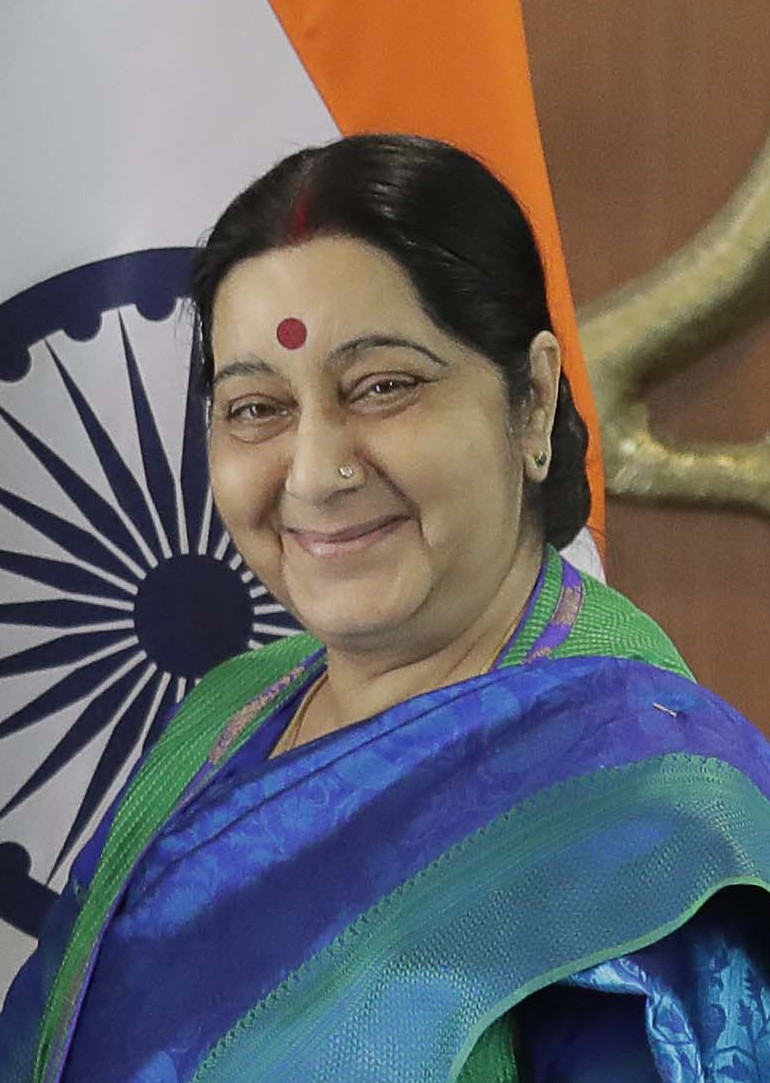
| | Majority party | Minority party |
|---|---|---|
| Leader | Sheila Dikshit | Sushma Swaraj |
| Party | INC | BJP |
| Leader since | 1998 | 1998 |
| Leader's seat | Gole Market | Hauz Khas |
| Seats before | 14 | 49 |
| Seats won | 52 | 15 |
| Seat change | ▲38 | ▼34 |
| Percentage | 47.76% | 34.02% |
CM before election
Sushma Swaraj
BJP
Elected CM
Sheila Dikshit
INC

The 1998 Delhi Legislative Assembly election, was held on 25 November 1998 and result declared on 28 November 1998 for Legislative Assembly of Delhi, led to the formation of government by Indian National Congress.

== Parties and alliances ==
| Party/Alliance Name | | Flag | Electoral symbol | Leader | Seats contested |
|---|---|---|---|---|---|
| NDA | Bharatiya Janata Party | | | Sushma Swaraj | 67 |
| NDA | Indian National Lok Dal | | | Om Prakash Chautala | 3 |
| Indian National Congress | | | | Shiela Dikshit | 70 |

== Result ==
| Party | Votes | % | Seats | +/– |
|---|---|---|---|---|
| Indian National Congress | 1,952,071 | 47.75 | 52 | ▲38 |
| Bharatiya Janata Party | 1,390,689 | 34.02 | 15 | ▼34 |
| Janata Dal | 73,385 | 1.80 | 1 | ▼3 |
| Others | 316,346 | 7.74 | 0 | 0 |
| Independents | 355,773 | 8.70 | 2 | ▼1 |
| Total | 4,088,264 | 100.00 | 70 | 0 |
| Valid votes | 4,088,264 | 99.11 | | |
| Invalid/blank votes | 36,722 | 0.89 | | |
| Total votes | 4,124,986 | 100.00 | | |
| Registered voters/turnout | 8,420,141 | 48.99 | | |
Source: ECI

== Results by constituency ==
| Assembly Constituency | | Winner | | | | Runner Up | | | | Margin |
| # | Name | Candidate | Party | Votes | % | Candidate | Party | Votes | % | Margin |
|---|---|---|---|---|---|---|---|---|---|---|
| 1 | Sarojini Nagar | Sh. Ram Bhaj | BJP | 21,318 | 49.80 | Mukesh Bhatt | INC | 19,790 | 46.23 | 1,528 |
| 2 | Gole Market | Sheila Dikshit | INC | 24,881 | 53.95 | Kirti Azad | BJP | 19,214 | 41.66 | 5,667 |
| 3 | Minto Road | Tajdar Babar | INC | 28,815 | 53.73 | Arun Jain Engineer | BJP | 14,050 | 26.20 | 14,765 |
| 4 | Kasturba Nagar | Sushil Choudhary | BJP | 20,146 | 42.04 | Ram Rattan Gupta | INC | 19,247 | 40.16 | 899 |
| 5 | Jangpura | Tarvinder Singh Marwah | INC | 28,384 | 51.47 | Bir Bahadur | BJP | 16,465 | 29.86 | 11,919 |
| 6 | Okhla | Parvez Hashmi | INC | 32,774 | 57.83 | Krishan Kumar Mehta | BJP | 14,613 | 25.78 | 18,161 |
| 7 | Kalkaji | Subhash Chopra | INC | 29,948 | 53.62 | Purnima Sethi | BJP | 24,704 | 44.23 | 5,244 |
| 8 | Malviya Nagar | Dr. Yoganand Shastri | INC | 30,910 | 55.19 | Rajendra Gupta | BJP | 22,946 | 40.97 | 7,964 |
| 9 | Hauz Khas | Sushma Swaraj | BJP | 25,267 | 49.29 | Professor Kiran Walia | INC | 22,652 | 44.19 | 2,615 |
| 10 | R.K. Puram | Ashok Singh | INC | 20,509 | 45.97 | Bodh Raj | BJP | 17,152 | 38.44 | 3,357 |
| 11 | Delhi Cantonment | Kiran Choudhary | INC | 23,445 | 51.94 | Karan Singh Tanwar | BJP | 20,819 | 46.12 | 2,626 |
| 12 | Janak Puri | Prof. Jagdish Mukhi | BJP | 31,115 | 55.86 | Shiv Kumar Sondhi | INC | 23,415 | 42.04 | 7,700 |
| 13 | Hari Nagar | Harsharan Singh Balli | BJP | 29,136 | 49.79 | O.P. Wadhwa | INC | 28,519 | 48.74 | 617 |
| 14 | Tilak Nagar | Jaspal Singh | INC | 27,240 | 49.22 | O.P. Babbar | BJP | 25,724 | 46.48 | 1,516 |
| 15 | Rajouri Garden | Ajay Makan | INC | 36,060 | 65.73 | Sashi Prabha Arya | BJP | 16,763 | 30.55 | 19,297 |
| 16 | Madipur (SC) | Mala Ram Gangwal | INC | 33,639 | 55.38 | Laxman Singh Atal | BJP | 25,543 | 42.06 | 8,096 |
| 17 | Tri Nagar | Nand Kishore Garg | BJP | 25,776 | 51.09 | Chattar Singh | INC | 23,493 | 46.56 | 2,283 |
| 18 | Shakur Basti | Dr. S.C. Vats | INC | 36,010 | 56.14 | Gauri Shankar Bhardwaj | BJP | 27,371 | 42.67 | 8,639 |
| 19 | Shalimar Bagh | Ravinder Nath | BJP | 32,623 | 57.37 | Sarla Kaushik | INC | 22,618 | 39.77 | 10,005 |
| 20 | Badli | Jai Bhagwan Aggarwal | BJP | 42,259 | 47.95 | Narain Singh Yadav | INC | 37,822 | 42.91 | 4,437 |
| 21 | Sahibabad Daulatpur | Ramesh Kumar | INC | 35,328 | 44.54 | Kulwant Rana | BJP | 25,529 | 32.18 | 9,799 |
| 22 | Bawana (SC) | Surender Kumar | INC | 40,241 | 59.18 | Om Parkash Rang | IND | 14,543 | 21.39 | 25,698 |
| 23 | Sultanpur Majra (SC) | Sushila Devi | INC | 34,194 | 56.79 | Kailash | BJP | 17,261 | 28.67 | 16,933 |
| 24 | Mangolpuri (SC) | Raj Kumar Chauhan | INC | 32,372 | 60.80 | Lakshmi Narayan | BJP | 11,358 | 21.33 | 21,014 |
| 25 | Nangloi Jat | Prem Chand | INC | 30,533 | 49.00 | Devender Singh | BJP | 27,706 | 44.46 | 2,827 |
| 26 | Vishnu Garden | Mahinder Singh Saathi | INC | 21,612 | 40.42 | Dayanand Chandila | JMM | 17,375 | 32.50 | 4,237 |
| 27 | Hastsal | Mukesh Sharma | INC | 48,146 | 52.79 | Naresh Tyagi | BJP | 24,858 | 27.26 | 23,288 |
| 28 | Najafgarh | Kanwal Singh | INC | 21,111 | 28.02 | Jai Kishan Sharma | IND | 19,284 | 25.60 | 1,827 |
| 29 | Nasirpur | Mahabal Mishra | INC | 37,774 | 48.28 | Vinod Kumar Sharma | BJP | 36,344 | 46.45 | 1,430 |
| 30 | Palam | Mahender Yadav | INC | 32,699 | 48.62 | Dharam Dev Solanki | BJP | 27,152 | 40.37 | 5,547 |
| 31 | Mahipalpur | Mahender Singh | INC | 31,818 | 51.92 | Surat Singh | INLD | 14,984 | 24.45 | 16,834 |
| 32 | Mehrauli | Bhram Singh Tanwar | BJP | 24,996 | 37.44 | Balram Tanwar | IND | 22,389 | 33.53 | 1,607 |
| 33 | Saket | Tek Chand Sharma | INC | 24,903 | 40.68 | Vijay Jolly | BJP | 17,729 | 28.96 | 7,174 |
| 34 | Dr. Ambedkar Nagar (SC) | Ch. Prem Singh | INC | 27,670 | 52.93 | Jagdish Bharti | BJP | 9,662 | 18.48 | 18,008 |
| 35 | Tuglakabad | Shish Pal Singh | INC | 39,551 | 49.59 | Ramesh Bidhuri | BJP | 30,672 | 38.45 | 8,879 |
| 36 | Badarpur | Ram Singh Netaji | IND | 40,548 | 45.50 | Ramvir Singh Bidhuri | INC | 26,259 | 29.46 | 14,289 |
| 37 | Trilokpuri (SC) | Brahm Pal | INC | 22,887 | 43.79 | Ram Charan (Gujrati) | BJP | 18,116 | 34.66 | 4,771 |
| 38 | Patpar Ganj (SC) | Amrish Singh Gautam | INC | 33,351 | 58.06 | Ganga Ram Pipal | BJP | 17,030 | 29.65 | 16,321 |
| 39 | Mandawali | Meera Bhardwaj | INC | 24,150 | 43.62 | Murari Singh Panwar | BJP | 22,307 | 40.29 | 1,843 |
| 40 | Geeta Colony | Ashok Kumar Walia | INC | 40,094 | 67.16 | Darshan Kumar Bahal | BJP | 17,124 | 28.68 | 22,970 |
| 41 | Gandhi Nagar | Arvinder Singh (Lovely) | INC | 21,905 | 41.67 | Swinderjit Singh Bajwa | BJP | 15,143 | 28.81 | 6,762 |
| 42 | Krishna Nagar | Harsh Vardhan | BJP | 30,358 | 54.82 | S.N. Misra | INC | 23,748 | 42.89 | 6,610 |
| 43 | Vishwash Nagar | Naseeb Singh | INC | 30,380 | 48.18 | Dr. Ved Vyas Mahajan | BJP | 29,924 | 47.45 | 456 |
| 44 | Shahdara | Narender Nath | INC | 29,929 | 55.86 | Jyotsna Aggarwal | BJP | 20,689 | 38.61 | 9,240 |
| 45 | Seemapuri (SC) | Veer Singh | INC | 30,330 | 63.26 | Chander Pal Singh | BJP | 13,647 | 28.46 | 16,683 |
| 46 | Nand Nagari (SC) | Roop Chand | INC | 25,742 | 46.78 | Fateh Singh | BJP | 15,006 | 27.27 | 10,736 |
| 47 | Rohtas Nagar | Radhey Shyam Khanna | INC | 22,746 | 43.19 | Alok Kumar | BJP | 22,579 | 42.87 | 167 |
| 48 | Babarpur | Naresh Gaur | BJP | 22,606 | 42.96 | Abdul Hameed | INC | 21,643 | 41.13 | 963 |
| 49 | Seelampur | Ch. Mateen Ahmad | IND | 27,376 | 49.68 | Data Ram | BJP | 11,001 | 19.96 | 16,375 |
| 50 | Ghonda | Bheeshm Sharma | INC | 25,014 | 50.89 | Sarvesh Sharma | BJP | 14,594 | 29.69 | 10,420 |
| 51 | Yamuna Vihar | Sahab Singh Chauhan | BJP | 24,258 | 44.63 | Pushkar Singh Rawat | INC | 22,974 | 42.27 | 1,284 |
| 52 | Qarawal Nagar | Mohan Singh Bisht | BJP | 23,191 | 29.17 | Zile Singh | INC | 20,133 | 25.33 | 3,058 |
| 53 | Wazirpur | Bandhu Deep Chand | INC | 36,010 | 59.69 | Shyam Lal Garg | BJP | 21,132 | 35.03 | 14,878 |
| 54 | Narela (SC) | Charan Singh Kandera | INC | 19,143 | 37.63 | Laxman Singh | BJP | 16,549 | 32.53 | 2,594 |
| 55 | Bhalswa Jahangirpur | J.S. Chauhan | INC | 31,991 | 41.73 | Jitender Kumar | DVP | 16,749 | 21.85 | 15,242 |
| 56 | Adarsh Nagar | Mangat Ram | INC | 37,818 | 61.75 | Jai Parkash Yadav | BJP | 18,300 | 29.88 | 19,518 |
| 57 | Pahar Ganj | Anjali Rai | INC | 31,065 | 63.89 | Nirmal Khandelwal | BJP | 14,217 | 29.24 | 16,848 |
| 58 | Matia Mahal | Shoaib Iqbal | JD | 28,872 | 65.18 | Aziz Ahmad Siddiqui | INC | 8,956 | 20.22 | 19,916 |
| 59 | Balli Maran | Haroon Yusuf | INC | 38,105 | 70.05 | Vishwamber Datt Sharma | BJP | 14,262 | 26.22 | 23,843 |
| 60 | Chandni Chowk | Prahlad Singh Sawhney | INC | 24,348 | 47.90 | Viresh Pratap Chaudhry | BJP | 16,186 | 31.84 | 8,162 |
| 61 | Timarpur | Jagdish Anand | INC | 27,411 | 52.27 | Raghuvansh Singhal | BJP | 19,559 | 37.30 | 7,852 |
| 62 | Model Town | Kanwar Karan Singh | INC | 32,315 | 55.75 | Bhola Nath Vij | BJP | 21,276 | 36.70 | 11,039 |
| 63 | Kamla Nagar | Shadi Ram | INC | 26,326 | 49.50 | Prof. P.K. Chandla | BJP | 19,940 | 37.50 | 6,386 |
| 64 | Sadar Bazar | Rajesh Jain | INC | 32,555 | 63.00 | Hari Krishan | BJP | 16,187 | 31.33 | 16,368 |
| 65 | Moti Nagar | Avinash Sahni | BJP | 29,589 | 49.87 | Kanwaljit Singh | INC | 26,280 | 44.29 | 3,309 |
| 66 | Patel Nagar | Rama Kant Goswami | INC | 26,135 | 47.38 | Mewa Ram Arya | BJP | 20,541 | 37.24 | 5,594 |
| 67 | Rajinder Nagar | Puran Chand Yogi | BJP | 21,150 | 37.63 | Brahm Yadav | IND | 19,767 | 35.17 | 1,383 |
| 68 | Karol Bagh (SC) | Moti Lal Bokolia | INC | 26,466 | 50.91 | Surender Pal Ratawal | BJP | 24,154 | 46.46 | 2,312 |
| 69 | Ram Nagar (SC) | Darshna | INC | 31,794 | 56.88 | Moti Lal Sodhi | BJP | 19,811 | 35.44 | 11,983 |
| 70 | Baljit Nagar (SC) | Krishna | INC | 28,832 | 55.83 | Yogendera Chandoliya | BJP | 17,047 | 33.01 | 11,785 |

== See also ==
- 1998 elections in India
- List of constituencies of the Delhi Legislative Assembly
- First Legislative Assembly of Delhi
- Second Legislative Assembly of Delhi
- Third Legislative Assembly of Delhi
- Fourth Legislative Assembly of Delhi
- Fifth Legislative Assembly of Delhi
- Sixth Legislative Assembly of Delhi
