= Sahib Singh Verma =

Indian politician (1943-2007)

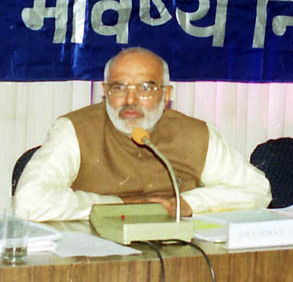
- Verma in December 2003

Union Minister of Labour and Employment
- In office 1 July 2002 – 22 May 2004
- Prime Minister: Atal Bihari Vajpayee
- Preceded by: Sharad Yadav
- Succeeded by: Shish Ram Ola

Member of Parliament, Lok Sabha
- In office 6 October 1999 – 13 May 2004
- Preceded by: Krishan Lal Sharma
- Succeeded by: Sajjan Kumar
- Constituency: Outer Delhi, Delhi

4th Chief Minister of Delhi
- In office 27 February 1996 – 12 October 1998
- Lieutenant Governor: Tejendra Khanna; Vijai Kapoor
- Preceded by: Madan Lal Khurana
- Succeeded by: Sushma Swaraj

Cabinet Minister, Government of Delhi
- In office 2 December 1993 – 26 February 1996
- Chief Minister: Madan Lal Khurana
- Ministry & Department's: Welfare; Labour; Tourism; Employment

Member of Delhi Legislative Assembly
- In office November 1993 – November 1998
- Preceded by: constituency established
- Succeeded by: Ravinder Nath Bansal
- Constituency: Shalimar Bagh

Councillor of Delhi Metropolitan Council
- In office 1977–1990

Personal details
- Born: 15 March 1943 Delhi, British India
- Died: 30 June 2007 (aged 64) Jonaicha Khurd, Rajasthan, India
- Party: Bharatiya Janata Party
- Spouse: Sahib Kaur (m. 1954)
- Children: 5 (including Parvesh Verma and Siddharth Verma)
- Profession: Agriculturist; educationist

Sahib Singh Verma (15 March 1943 – 30 June 2007) was an Indian politician. He served as the 4th Chief Minister of Delhi (1996–1998) and Union Labour Minister of India from 2002 to 2004. He was a member of 13th Lok Sabha, Parliament of India (1999–2004).

== Life ==
Sahib Singh Verma was born on 15 March 1943 in Mundka village of Delhi to Chaudhary Mir Singh Lakra, a zamindar, and Bharpai Devi in a Jat family. He had 3 brothers Azad Singh Verma, Rajender Singh Lakra and Attar Singh Verma. He was influenced by Arya Samaj from an early age.

Singh had a PhD degree in Library Science, and started work as librarian in Bhagat Singh College, Delhi. He held a master's degree in Arts, (M.A.) and also in Library Science from Aligarh Muslim University.

He was married to Sahib Kaur and had two sons and three daughters. One of his sons, Parvesh Verma is serving as Member of Delhi Legislative Assembly from New Delhi.

== Political career ==
He was active in the Rashtriya Swayamsevak Sangh. He had also served the World Jat Aryan Foundation, as its president.

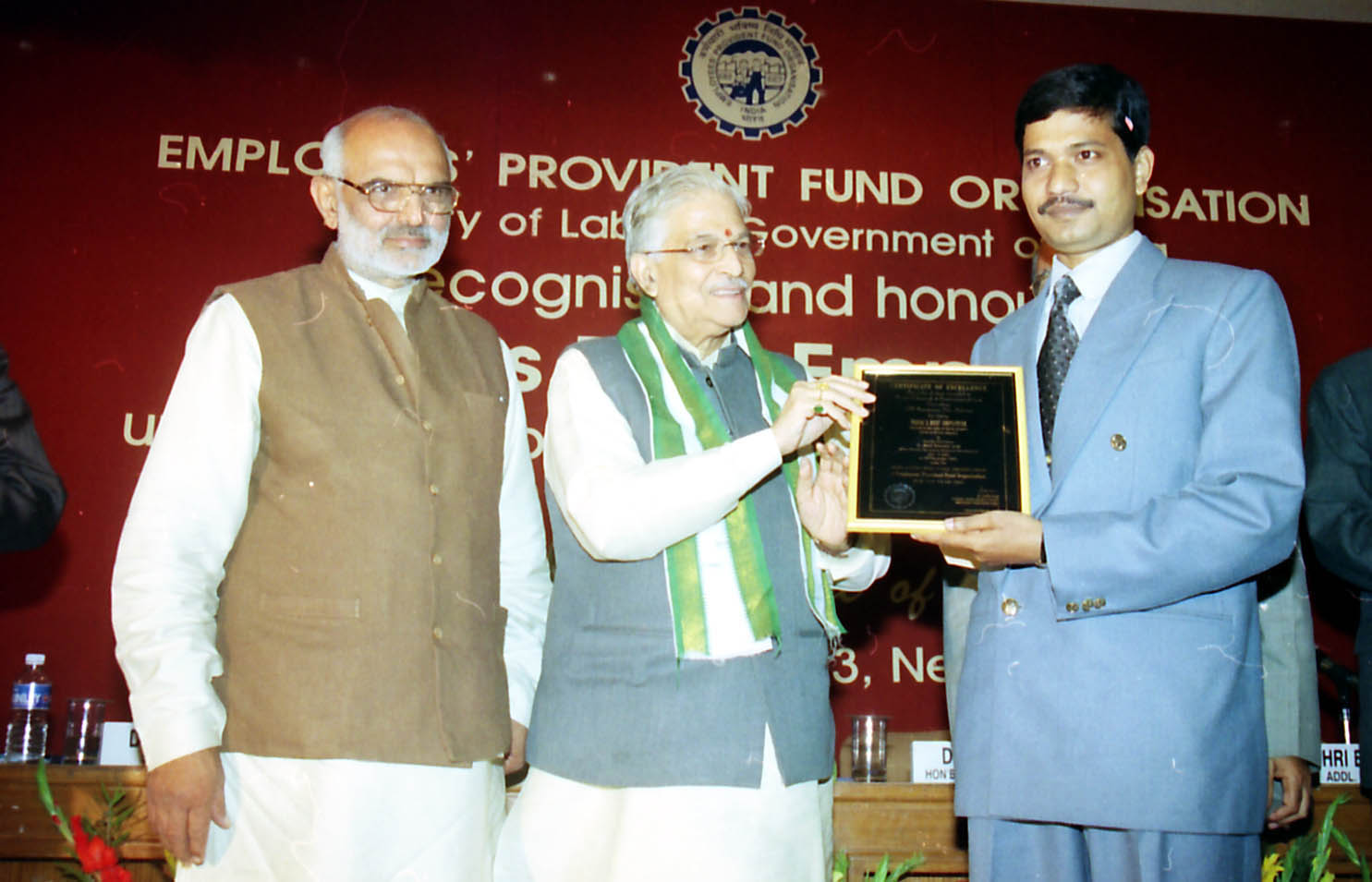
The Union Minister for Human Resource Development Dr. Murli Manohar Joshi presenting "Best Employer's Award - 2003" to one of the awardees at a function, in New Delhi on 3 December 2003 (Wednesday). The Union Minister for Labour Dr. Sahib Singh Verma is also seen.

In 1977 he was elected to the Municipal Corporation of Delhi and took the Oath as a Councillor by the hands of Guru Radha Kishan. Initially he won as a Janata Party candidate and was re-elected on a BJP ticket. He became the Education and Development Minister in the Delhi government in 1993.

In 1996, after Madan Lal Khurana was embroiled in a corruption crisis, Sahib Singh became the Chief Minister of Delhi. Singh served as CM for two and a half years, facing increasing rivalry from Khurana. Following an onion price crisis, he was replaced by Sushma Swaraj.

Subsequently, he won the Lok Sabha elections, 1999 from Outer Delhi with a margin of over two lakh votes. In 2002, he became Minister of Labour in the Vajpayee government, and was known as "bull in a China shop" for standing up against the bureaucrats against lowering the Provident Fund interest rate. He was defeated in the 2004 polls.

He died in a road accident in Rajasthan in 2007 when the car he was travelling in had a head-on collision with a truck.

== See also ==
- Verma cabinet

Political offices
Preceded by Madan Lal Khurana	Chief Minister of the Delhi; 1996-97	Succeeded by Sushma Swaraj
