= Vijay Goel (politician) =

Indian politician

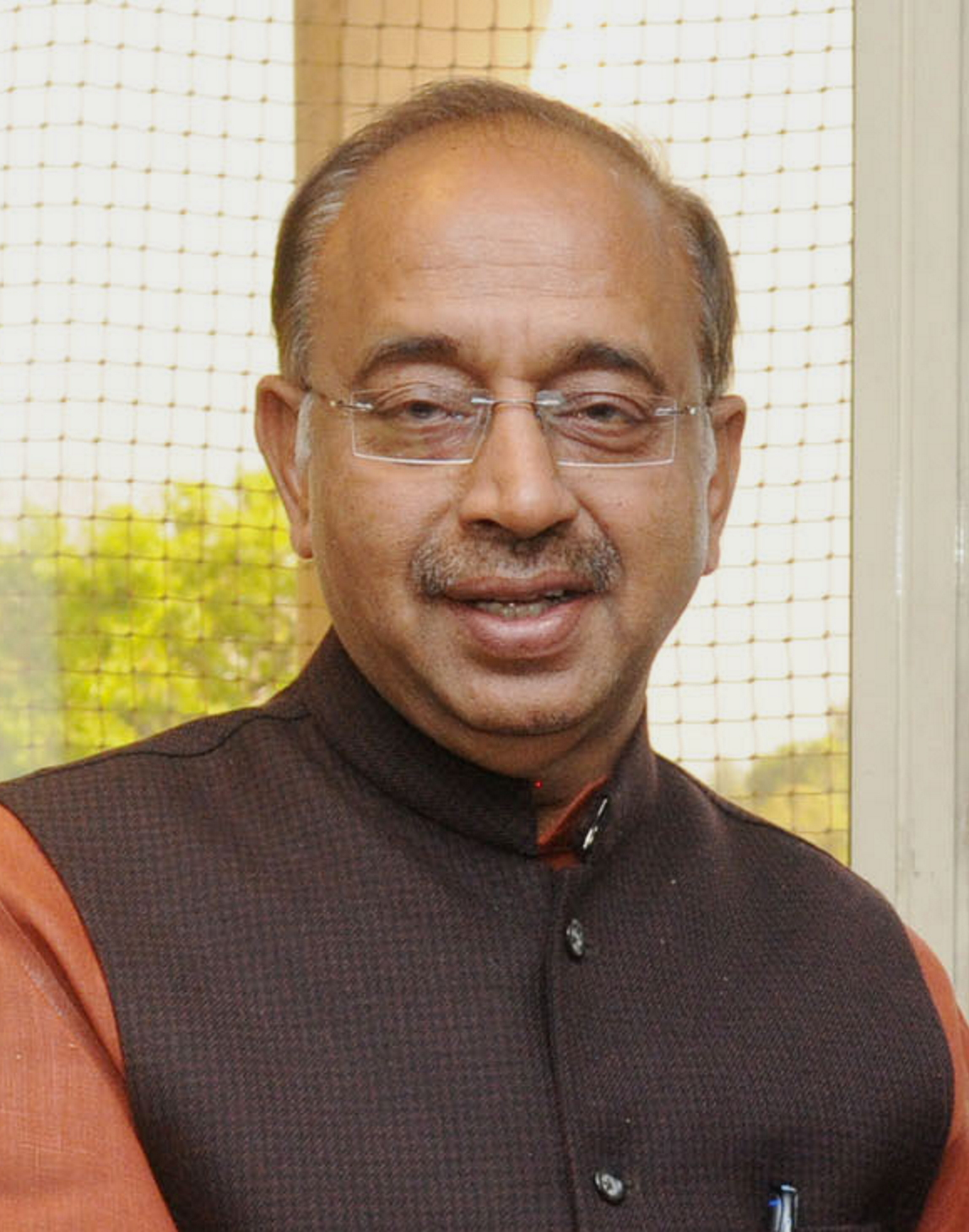

Member of Parliament, Rajya Sabha
- In office 2014–2020
- Succeeded by: Rajendra Gehlot
- Constituency: Rajasthan

Minister of State Ministry of Parliamentary Affairs
- In office 3 September 2017 – 24 May 2019
- Prime Minister: Narendra Modi
- Preceded by: S.S. Ahluwalia and Mukhtar Abbas Naqvi
- Succeeded by: Arjun Ram Meghwal and V Muraleedharan

Minister of State for Sports and Youth Affairs
- In office 5 July 2016 – 3 September 2017
- Prime Minister: Narendra Modi
- Preceded by: Jitendra Singh Rana
- Succeeded by: Rajyavardhan Singh Rathore

Minister of State for Statistics & Programme Implementation
- In office 3 September 2017 – 24 May 2019
- Prime Minister: Narendra Modi
- In office 1 July 2002 – 1 July 2004
- Prime Minister: Atal Bihari Vajpayee

Minister of State for Planning
- In office 1 September 2001 – 1 November 2001
- Prime Minister: Atal Bihari Vajpayee

Minister of State for Prime Minister's Office
- In office 1 Sept. 2001 – 1 July 2004
- Prime Minister: Atal Bihari Vajpayee

Member of Parliament, Lok Sabha
- In office 1998–2004
- Preceded by: Jai Prakash Agarwal
- Succeeded by: Kapil Sibal
- Constituency: Chandni Chowk
- In office 1996–1998
- Preceded by: Jagdish Tytler
- Succeeded by: Madan Lal Khurana
- Constituency: Delhi Sadar

Personal details
- Born: 4 January 1954 (age 72) Delhi, India
- Party: Bharatiya Janata Party
- Spouse: Prof. Preeti Goel
- Children: 2
- Education: Shri Ram College of Commerce, Delhi (M.Com.); Faculty of Law, Delhi (LL.B.)
- Occupation: Politician
- Profession: Political & Social Worker.
- Website: www.vijaygoel.in

Vijay Goel (born 4 January 1954) is an Indian politician and a former Minister of State for Parliamentary Affairs and Statistic and Implementation in the NDA government. A former Minister of Youth Affairs and Sports, Goel is affiliated with the Bharatiya Janata Party (BJP). He became president of the Delhi unit of the BJP in February 2013. He was elected to the Rajya Sabha from Rajasthan in 2014.

He is a former Delhi University Students' Union president and an alumnus of Shri Ram College of Commerce. He has been the Member of Parliament for the 11th, 12th and 13th Lok Sabha representing the Sadar and Chandni Chowk constituencies of Delhi. He also served as the Union Minister of State of Labour, Parliamentary Affairs, Statistics & Programme Implementation and Youth Affairs & Sports in the National Democratic Alliance (India) government until 2004.

== Early and personal life ==
Vijay Goel was born to former Delhi Vidhan Sabha Speaker and BJP member Charti Lal Goel and Basanti Devi on 4 January 1954. He has an M.Com. degree from Shri Ram College of Commerce and a LL.B. degree from the University of Delhi. He was a member of the Rashtriya Swayamsevak Sangh and was jailed during Emergency in India. After his release from jail, Goel became president of Delhi University Students Union in 1977 as a candidate of the Akhil Bharatiya Vidyarthi Parishad. He married Preeti Goel, a professor at the University of Delhi, on 8 March 1985. The couple have a son and a daughter.

Goel was the Akhil Bharatiya Vidyarthi Parishad (ABVP) treasurer in 1974–1975. He exposed corruption concerning fake certificates that was then operating at the university.

== Political career ==
Goel elected to 11th Lok Sabha from Sadar and to 12th and 13th Lok Sabha from Chandni Chowk.

He served as Minister of State for Labour, Parliamentary Affairs, Statistics & Programme Implementation and Youth Affairs & Sports till 2004 in the Vajpayee Government. Goel played an instrumental role in winning the bid to host 2010 Commonwealth Games in Delhi. Later, he was among the first few people to bring out financial irregularities by officials of the Games' Organising Committee.

Goel had been promoted as the BJP's candidate for Chief Minister in the 2013 Delhi Legislative Assembly election until six weeks prior to voting day. According to some source, the electoral threat posed by the recently formed Aam Aadmi Party caused him to be replaced by Harsh Vardhan. Other sources say that he met with opposition from the Rashtriya Swayamsevak Sangh, an organisation that is closely associated with the BJP and who were unhappy with how he was running the party in the state.

He was elected to Rajya Sabha from Rajasthan in 2014.

He remained the Minister of State for Youth Affairs & Sports from 5 July 2016 to 3 September 2017. In his tenure, a dedicated portal was launched to search young, talented people in sports who otherwise go unnoticed. The National Talent Search Portal connects potential sportsperson to the Sports Authority of India (SAI) centres for training and better guidance. He became the minister of state for Parliamentary Affairs on 3 September 2017.

== Contributions ==
Under the banner of Lok Abhiyan, a socio-cultural organisation, Goel initiated protests against state-sponsored lotteries in India in 1993. He led a campaign supported by over 120 MPs. The lottery was banned in India on 7 July 1998.

Vijay Goel established The Toy Bank, a not for profit organisation, in 1987 that collects toys from donors, refurbishes/renews them and redistributes the toys amongst the underprivileged children in Delhi. The Toy Bank was co-founded by his daughter Vidyun Goel.

Goel has been actively involved in heritage conservation. As a Lok Sabha representative from Chandni Chowk, Goel hosted a two-day cultural festival "Chaudhvin Ka Chand" in 1998 to get the soul back into the 350-year-old city of Shahjahanabad and turn Chandni Chowk into a major tourist attraction in Delhi. For this, among other measures, electricity polls were rooted out, pavements were cleared of encroachments, and shop shutters were painted to spruce up the locality before cultural festival.

Goel also restored a 200-year-old haveli named Dharampura Haveli in Chandni Chowk with his son Siddhant Goel. Goel's Dharampura Haveli has recently won prestigious UNESCO Asia-Pacific 2017 Awards for Cultural Heritage Conservation.

== Publications ==
- Delhi, The Emperor's City: Rediscovering Chandni Chowk and its Environs, by Vijay Goel. Lustre Press, 2003. ISBN 81-7436-240-1.
- Old Delhi and the Walled City by Vijay Goel, Om Publications 2011
- Purane Khel, Khan-Pan aur Rehan-Sehan, by Vijay Goel, Diamond Books, 2018. ISBN 978-93-5278-941-2
