= Charti Lal Goel =

Indian politician

1st Speaker of the Delhi Legislative Assembly
- In office 1993–1998
- Preceded by: office established
- Succeeded by: Chaudhary Prem Singh

Personal details
- Born: 1927
- Died: 16 August 2016 (aged 88–89)
- Party: Bharatiya Janata Party
- Children: 2 daughters, 3 sons including Vijay Goel

Charti Lal Goel (1927 – 16 August 2016) was an Indian politician and leader of Bharatiya Janata Party from Delhi.

He was Speaker of the Delhi Legislative Assembly from 1993 to 1998. He was associated with Bharatiya Jan Sangh and was jailed in 1975 in the Emergency.

He died at the age of 89 at All India Institute of Medical Sciences Delhi. He is survived by his wife, three sons, including former Union Sports Minister Vijay Goel, and two daughters.
