= Banwari Lal Joshi =

Indian political figure (1936–2017)

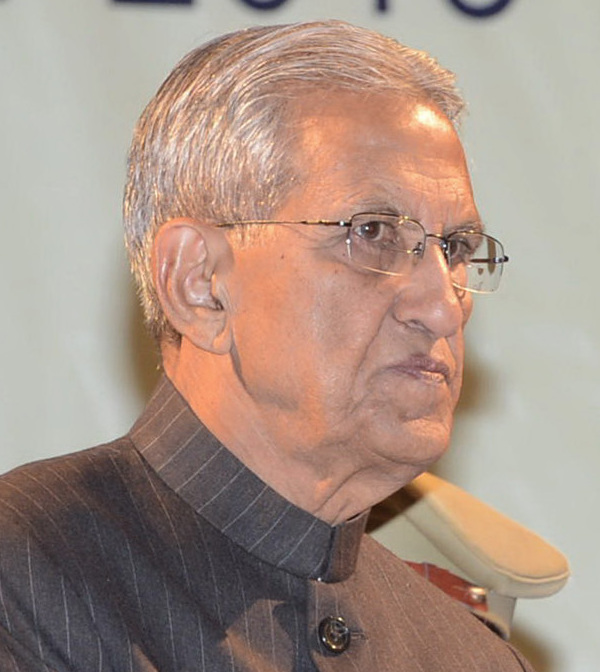

18th Governor of Uttar Pradesh
- In office 28 July 2009 – 17 June 2014
- Appointed by: Pratibha Patil
- Preceded by: T. V. Rajeswar
- Succeeded by: Aziz Qureshi (Additional charge)

Governor of Uttarakhand
- In office 4 July 2011 – 12 August 2011
- Appointed by: Pratibha Patil
- Preceded by: Margaret Alva
- Succeeded by: Margaret Alva
- In office 29 October 2007 – 27 July 2009
- Appointed by: Pratibha Patil
- Preceded by: Sudarshan Agarwal
- Succeeded by: Margaret Alva

Governor of Meghalaya
- In office 12 April 2007 – 28 October 2007
- Appointed by: A. P. J. Abdul Kalam
- Preceded by: M. M. Jacob
- Succeeded by: Shivinder Singh Sidhu (Additional charge)

Lieutenant Governor of Delhi
- In office 9 June 2004 – 9 April 2007
- Appointed by: A. P. J. Abdul Kalam
- Preceded by: Vijai Kapoor
- Succeeded by: Tejendra Khanna

Personal details
- Born: 27 March 1936 Chhoti Kathu, Jodhpur State, British India
- Died: 22 December 2017 (aged 81) New Delhi, India
- Profession: Civil servant (Retd.)

Banwari Lal Joshi (27 March 1936 – 22 December 2017) was an Indian civil servant and government official who was Governor of the Indian state of Uttar Pradesh from 2009 to 24 June 2014. He was previously Lieutenant-Governor of Delhi from 2004 to 2007, Governor of Meghalaya in 2007, and Governor of Uttarakhand from July 2011 to August 2011 and October 2007 to July 2009.

Born in a small Rajasthan village of Choti Kathu of Nagour district, Joshi began his career in 1957 with the state police service in Rajasthan and moved to the Government of India in 1962.

During a long service career, Joshi worked in different administrative positions including the Ministry of Home Affairs, with Prime Ministers Lal Bahadur Shastri and Indira Gandhi, with the High Commissions of India at Islamabad and London, and with the Embassy of India at Washington, D.C. He took voluntary retirement from the Indian Police Service in 1991 and got involved in social work.

Joshi moved to the United States in 1993, where he worked with two large American software companies and also as executive director of an NGO located in California, which awards scholarships to bright and needy students in India.

On his return from the U.S. in March 2000, Joshi was appointed Member of the Rajasthan State Human Rights Commission, a position equivalent to a High Court Judge, where he worked for four years.

He assumed the post of the Lieutenant-Governor of Delhi on 9 June 2004 and relinquished this responsibility on being appointed Governor of Meghalaya in April 2007. In October 2007, he was appointed Governor of the State of Uttarakhand. He was sworn in as Governor of Uttar Pradesh on 28 July 2009.

On 17 June 2014 he resigned from the post of Governor of Uttar Pradesh.

Joshi has traveled extensively in India and abroad. He took a keen interest in social work and was also associated with several social service groups and agencies.
