= Tejendra Khanna =

Indian politician

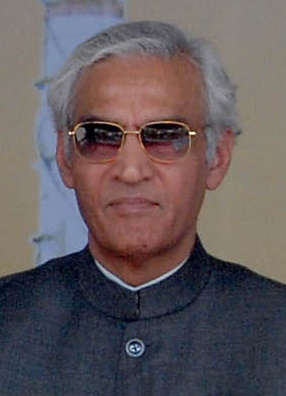
- Khanna in 2008

15th Lieutenant Governor of Delhi
- In office 9 April 2007 – 8 July 2013
- President: A. P. J. Abdul Kalam; Pratibha Patil; Pranab Mukherjee
- Chief Minister: Sheila Dikshit
- Preceded by: Banwari Lal Joshi
- Succeeded by: Najeeb Jung
- In office 4 January 1997 – 20 April 1998
- Chief Minister: Sahib Singh Verma; Sushma Swaraj
- Preceded by: Prasannabhai Karunashankar Dave
- Succeeded by: Vijai Kapoor

Personal details
- Born: 16 December 1938 (age 87) Patna, Bihar, British India
- Spouse: Uma Khanna
- Children: 2
- Education: St. Xavier's High School, Patna; University of Patna; University of California-Berkeley
- Website: Lieutenant Governor of Delhi
- As of 12 December, 2010 Source: Government of Delhi

Tejendra Khanna (born 16 December 1938) is the former Lieutenant Governor of Delhi twice, from January 1997 to April 1998 and again from April 2007 - July 2013. He also served as Chancellor of Delhi Technological University, Indraprastha Institute of Information Technology, Delhi, Guru Gobind Singh Indraprastha University and Ambedkar University.

== Early life and education ==
Tejendra Khanna was born in Patna, Bihar on 16 December 1938. He earned his Master of Science (Physics) from Patna University and Master of Arts in Public Administration from University of California, Berkeley.

== Career ==
He was a 1961 batch Indian Administrative Service (IAS) officer. He held different administrative positions in Punjab. He was the Chief Secretary, Punjab during 1991-92 and conducted the 1992 February elections in Punjab as Chief Election Officer, which brought back an elected Government in the state after a long period of President’s Rule.

He also held important positions in the Government of India. He served as Commercial Counselor, Indian High Commission, U.K. (1975–77), Chief Controller, Imports and Exports (1989–91), Secretary to Government of India, Ministry of Food (1992–93) and Commerce Secretary to Government of India (1993–96).

Immediately on his retirement on 31.12.1996, he was appointed 16th Lt. Governor and Administrator of the National Capital and served in this capacity up to April 1998. He again served as Delhi's 19th Lt. Governor from 9 April 2007 to 8 July 2013.

== Honours, awards and international recognition ==
He was conferred an Honorary Doctorate Degree in Political Science, by the Wonkwang University on 2010 and a Doctorate Degree (Honoris Causa) by TERI University.

== See also ==
- Najeeb Jung
- List of lieutenant governors of Delhi

Government offices
Preceded by Prasannabhai Karunashankar Dave	Lieutenant Governor of Delhi; 4 January 1997 – 20 April 1998	Succeeded by Vijai Kapoor

Government offices
Preceded by Banwari Lal Joshi	Lieutenant Governor of Delhi; 9 April 2007 – July, 2013	Succeeded by Najeeb Jung
