= Devender Singh Shokeen =

Indian politician and bureaucrat

Devender Singh Shokeen is a former Indian bureaucrat, politician and leader of the Bharatiya Janata Party from Delhi. His father Ch. Sultan Singh was a senior bureaucrat in Delhi. He was elected to Delhi Legislative Assembly from Nangloi Jat in 1993 and served as a Minister of Transport and Development in the Government of Delhi in 1998.
