= Purnima Sethi =

Indian politician

Purnima Sethi (18 October 1954 – 17 October 2012) was an Indian politician and leader of Bharatiya Janata Party from Delhi. She was elected to Delhi Legislative Assembly from Kalkaji (Delhi Assembly constituency) and served as a minister in Government of Delhi in 1998.
