= Sheila Dikshit =

Indian politician and former chief minister of Delhi (1938–2019)

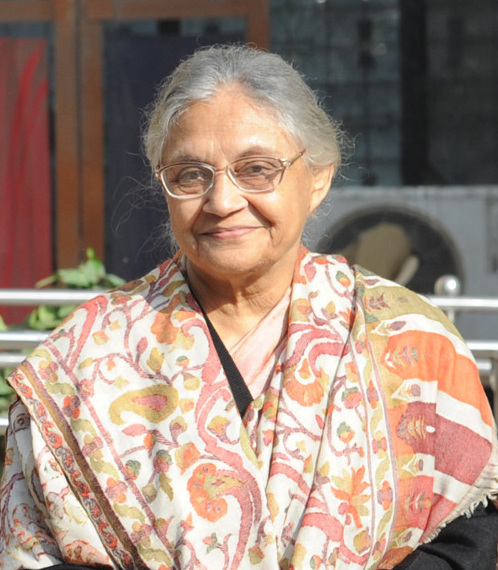

President of Delhi Pradesh Congress Committee
- In office 11 January 2019 – 20 July 2019
- AICC President: Rahul Gandhi
- Preceded by: Ajay Maken
- Succeeded by: Subhash Chopra
- In office 1998–1999
- AICC President: Sonia Gandhi
- Preceded by: Ajay Maken
- Succeeded by: Subhash Chopra

20th Governor of Kerala
- In office 11 March 2014 – 4 September 2014
- Chief Minister: Oommen Chandy
- Preceded by: Nikhil Kumar
- Succeeded by: P. Sathasivam

6th Chief Minister of Delhi
- In office 3 December 1998 – 28 December 2013
- Lieutenant Governor: Vijai Kapoor; Banwari Lal Joshi; Tejendra Khanna; Najeeb Jung
- Preceded by: Sushma Swaraj
- Succeeded by: Arvind Kejriwal

Member of Delhi Legislative Assembly
- In office 4 December 2008 – 28 December 2013
- Preceded by: Constituency established
- Succeeded by: Arvind Kejriwal
- Constituency: New Delhi
- In office 3 December 1998 – 3 December 2008
- Preceded by: Kirti Azad
- Succeeded by: Constituency abolished
- Constituency: Gole Market

Member of Parliament, Lok Sabha
- In office 1984–1989
- Preceded by: Chhotey Singh Yadav
- Succeeded by: Chhotey Singh Yadav
- Constituency: Kannauj, Uttar Pradesh

Member of the Indian Delegation for United Nations Commission on the Status of Women
- In office 1984–1989
- Prime Minister: Indira Gandhi; Rajiv Gandhi

Union Minister of State for Parliamentary Affairs
- In office 12 May 1986 – 2 December 1989 Serving with Sitaram Kesri (1986) M. M. Jacob (1986-1989)
- Prime Minister: Rajiv Gandhi
- Minister: H. K. L. Bhagat
- Preceded by: Ghulam Nabi Azad
- Succeeded by: Radhakishan Malviya

Personal details
- Born: 31 March 1938 Kapurthala, Kapurthala State, British India (present-day: Punjab, India)
- Died: 20 July 2019 (aged 81) New Delhi, Delhi, India
- Party: Indian National Congress
- Spouse: Vinod Kumar Dikshit (m. 1962)
- Children: 2 (including Sandeep Dikshit)
- Education: Miranda House, DU

Sheila Dikshit (pronounced [ˈʃiːlaː ˈdiːkʂɪt]) (née Kapoor; 31 March 1938 – 20 July 2019) was an Indian politician. The longest-serving chief minister of Delhi, as well as the longest-serving female chief minister in Indian history, she served for a period of 15 years beginning in 1998. Dikshit led the Indian National Congress party to three consecutive electoral victories in Delhi.

Dikshit lost the December 2013 elections of the Delhi Legislative Assembly to the Bharatiya Janata Party, though Aam Aadmi Party formed a minority government with outside support from the INC, with Arvind Kejriwal as the chief minister. She briefly served as the Governor of Kerala in 2014. Dikshit was later declared a chief ministerial candidate for the Indian National Congress in the 2017 Uttar Pradesh Legislative Assembly election, but withdrew her nomination (Akhilesh Yadav was announced as candidate). She was appointed president of Delhi Pradesh Congress Committee on 10 January 2019 to lead the general election in Delhi for Congress and remained in office until her death in July later that year.

== Early years ==
Sheila Kapoor was born on 31 March 1938 in the city of Kapurthala in the Kapurthala Princely State of British India (now in Punjab, India) into a Punjabi Hindu Khatri family. Her father's name was Sanjay Kapoor. She was educated at the Convent of Jesus and Mary School in New Delhi and graduated with a Master of Arts degree in history from the Miranda House at the University of Delhi.

== Political career ==
Sheila Dikshit was handpicked by Rajiv Gandhi to be part of his council of ministers after he became the prime minister in 1984. During the period between 1984 and 1989, she represented Kannauj parliamentary constituency of Uttar Pradesh. As a member of Parliament, she served on the Estimates Committee of Lok Sabha. Dikshit also chaired the Implementation Committee for Commemoration of Forty Years of India's Independence and Jawaharlal Nehru centenary. She represented India at United Nations Commission on Status of Women for five years (1984–1989). She also served as a Union Minister during 1986–1989, first as the Minister of State for Parliamentary Affairs and later as a minister of state in the Prime Minister's Office. In Uttar Pradesh, she and her 82 colleagues were jailed in August 1990 for 23 days by the state government when she led a movement against the atrocities being committed against women.

Earlier, in the early 1970s, she was chairperson of the Young Women's Association and was instrumental in the setting up of two of the most successful hostels for working women in Delhi. She was also the secretary of the Indira Gandhi Memorial Trust.

In the 1998 parliamentary elections, Dikshit was defeated by Bharatiya Janata Party's Lal Bihari Tiwari in East Delhi constituency. Later in the year, Dikshit became Chief Minister of Delhi, a position she held until 2013. Dikshit represented the Gole Market assembly constituency in the 1998 and 2003 Assembly elections and New Delhi constituency from 2008.

In 2009 and 2013, Dikshit was investigated for alleged misuse of government funds, but no charges were brought.

Her party was wiped out in the 2013 Delhi Legislative Assembly election and Arvind Kejriwal, founder of the Aam Aadmi Party, won the election in the New Delhi Assembly constituency by a margin of 25,864 votes. She resigned on 8 December 2013, but remained the caretaker chief minister of Delhi until the new government was sworn in on 28 December 2013. She was appointed the governor of Kerala in March 2014, but was forced to resign five months later. She contested the 2019 Lok Sabha Elections as the candidate for Indian National Congress in the North East Delhi Constituency but came second after Bharatiya Janata Party's Manoj Tiwari.

== Personal life ==
Dikshit was married to Vinod Dikshit, son of independence activist and former West Bengal governor Uma Shankar Dikshit from Unnao. He was an officer in the Indian Administrative Service.

Dikshit was the mother of two children: a son, Sandeep Dikshit, who is a former member of Parliament of the 15th Lok Sabha from East Delhi, and a daughter, Latika Dikshit, who was married to Syed Mohammad Imran, an architect.

Dikshit underwent angioplasty in November 2012. In 2018, she had heart surgery in University Hospital in Lille, France.

== Death ==
Dikshit was admitted to Fortis Escorts Heart Institute on 19 July 2019 for cardiac arrhythmia and was put on a ventilator within a few moments of her admission. Her condition stabilised temporarily, however she did not recover from multiple cardiac arrests and her condition worsened during the following period. She later died at 3:55 pm on 20 July 2019, at the age of 81.

The Delhi government announced a two-day mourning period on her death, and accorded her a state funeral.

== Awards and recognition ==
- 2008 Best Chief Minister of India, by Journalist Association of India
- 2009 Politician of the Year by NDTV
- 2010 Dara Shikoh award by Indo-Iran Society
- 2013 Delhi Women of the Decade Achievers Award 2013 by ALL Ladies League for Outstanding Public Service.

== Gallery ==
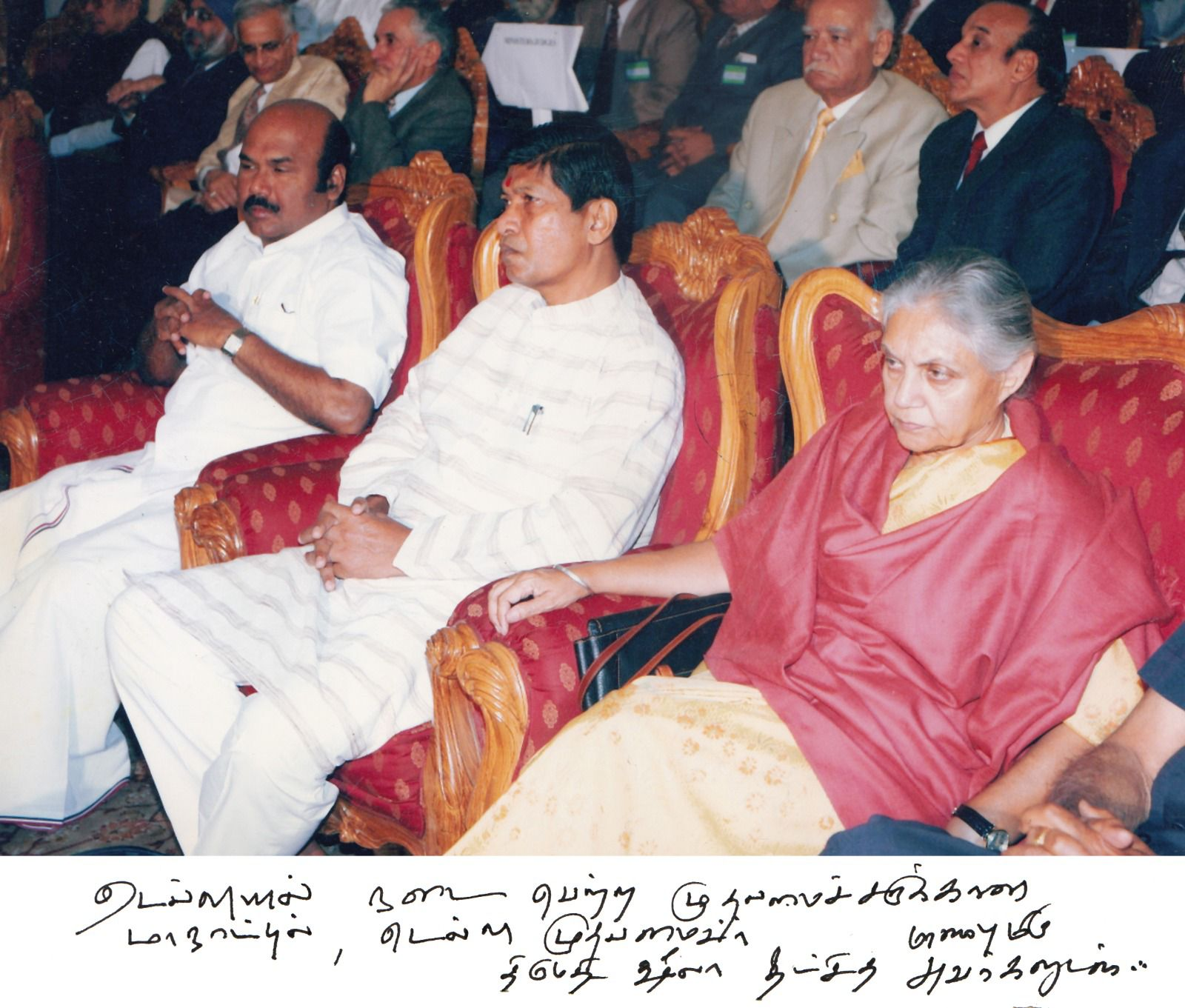
Dikshit at Chief Ministers Conference in New Delhi.

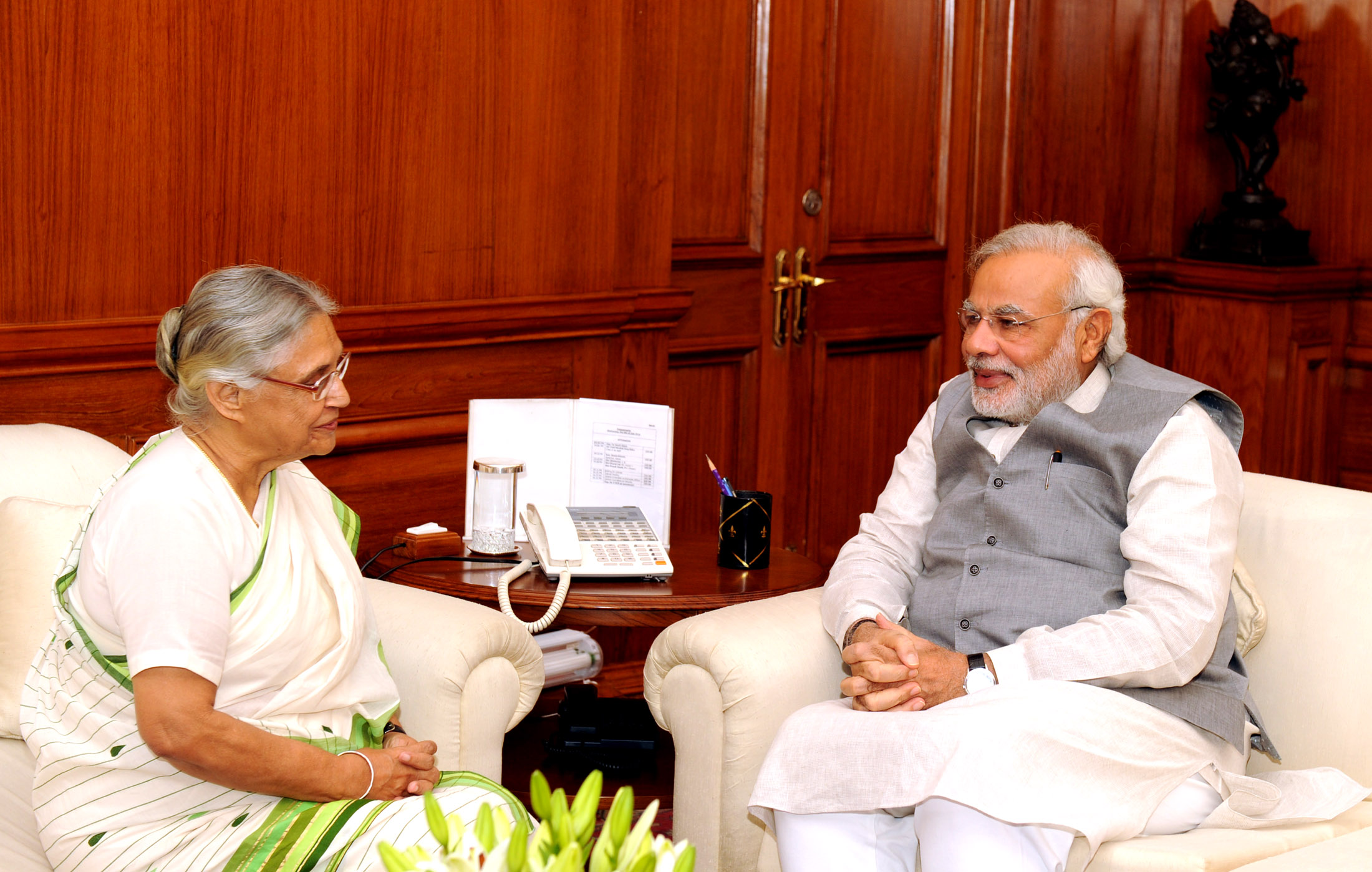
Dikshit meets Prime Minister Modi.

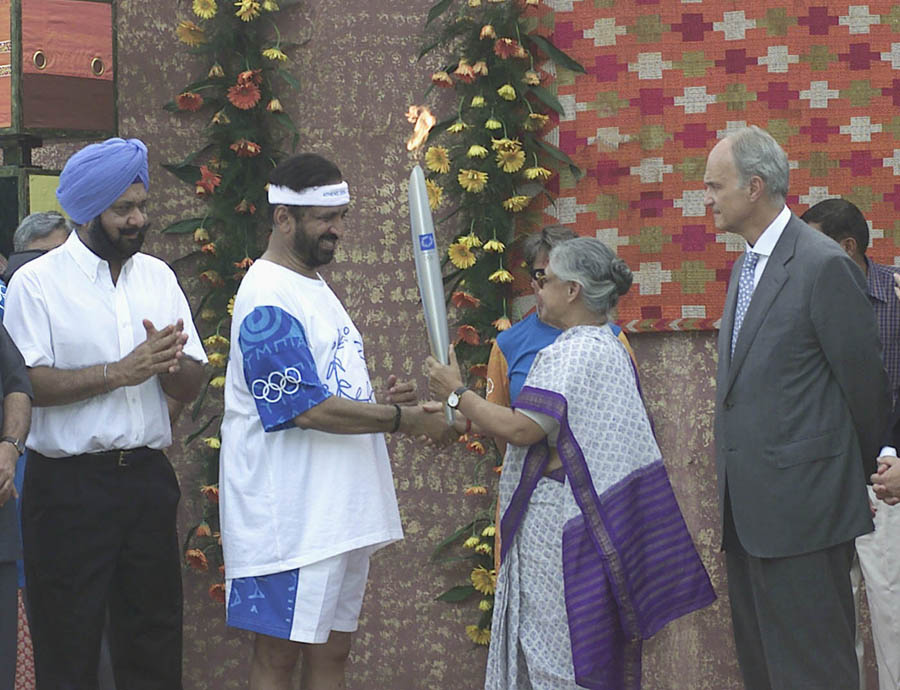
Sheila Dikshit handing over the Olympic Torch to Indian Olympic Association president Suresh Kalmadi at the beginning of the Olympic Torch Relay in 2004

Lok Sabha
Preceded by Chotey Singh Yadav	Member of Parliament; Kannauj; 31 December 1984 – 27 November 1989	Succeeded by Chotey Singh Yadav
Government offices
Preceded by Nikhil Kumar	Governor of Kerala; 11 March 2014 – 4 September 2014	Succeeded by P. Sathasivam
Political offices
Preceded by Sushma Swaraj	Chief Minister of Delhi; 3 December 1998 – 28 December 2013	Succeeded by Arvind Kejriwal
Party political offices
Preceded by Ajay Maken	President; Delhi Pradesh Congress Committee; 10 January 2019 – 20 July 2019	Succeeded by Subhash Chopra
