= 1993 Delhi Legislative Assembly election =

1993 state assembly election in Delhi

- 6 November 1993

All 70 seats to the Delhi Legislative Assembly 36 seats needed for a majority
- Turnout: 61.75%
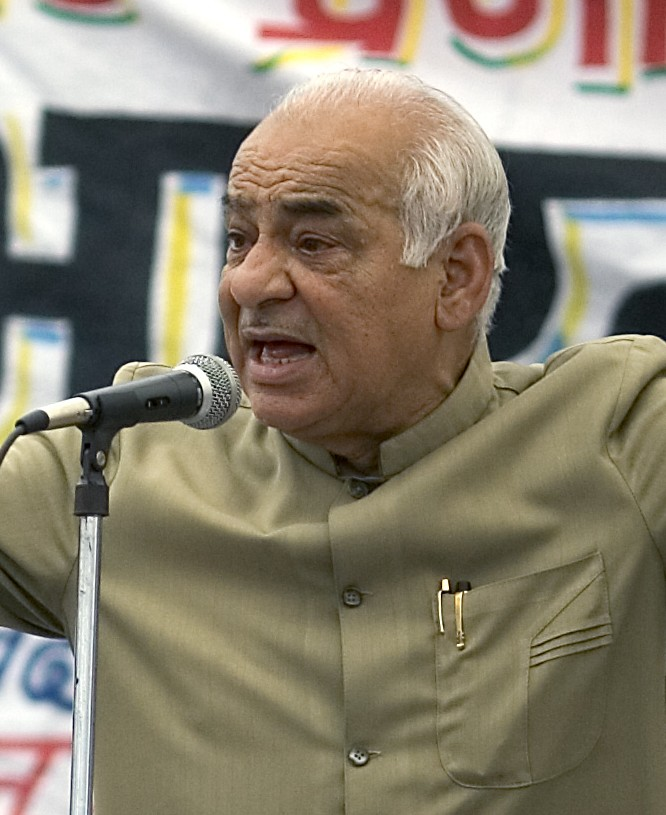

	First party	Second party
Leader	Madan Lal Khurana
Party	BJP	INC
Leader's seat	Moti Nagar
Seats won	49	14
Percentage	47.82%	34.48%
	Third party	Fourth party
	JD
Party	JD	Independents
Seats won	4	3
Percentage	12.65%	5.92%
- Map of Delhi showing Assembly constituencies and winning parties
Chief Minister before election
First Election
First Election
Chief Minister
Madan Lal Khurana
BJP

Legislative Assembly elections were held in Delhi on the 6 November 1993. The result was a victory for the Bhartiya Janata Party, which won 49 of the 70 seats in the Assembly.

== State Reorganization ==
First Legislative Assembly elections in Delhi were held in 1952. But under States Reorganisation Act, 1956, Delhi was made a Union Territory under the direct administration of the President of India and the Delhi Legislative Assembly was abolished simultaneously. So the next legislative assembly elections in Delhi were held in 1993, when Union Territory of Delhi was formally declared as National Capital Territory of Delhi by the Sixty-ninth Amendment to the Indian constitution.

== Parties and alliances ==
Party Name	Flag	Electoral symbol	Leader	Seats contested
Bharatiya Janata Party			Madan Lal Khurana	70
Indian National Congress			H. K. L. Bhagat	70
Janata Dal			V. P. Singh	70

== Results ==
Party	Votes	%	Seats
Bharatiya Janata Party		47.82	49
Indian National Congress		34.48	14
Janata Dal		12.65	4
Bahujan Samaj Party		1.88	0
Communist Party (Marxist)		0.38	0
Communist Party		0.21	0
Janata Party		0.20	0
Shiv Sena		0.14	0
All India Forward Bloc		0.03	0
Unrecognised parties		1.29	0
Independents		5.92	3
Invalid/blank votes	60,902	–	–
Total	3,612,713	100	70
Registered voters/turnout	5,850,545	61.75	–
Source: ECI

== Detailed Constituency Wise Results ==
Constituency		Winner				Runner-up				Margin	
Constituency		Candidate	Party	Votes	%	Candidate	Party	Votes	%	Votes	%
1	Sarojini Nagar	Ram Bhaj	BJP	26,307	63.82	Prem Das Ahuja	INC	12,111	29.38	14,196	34.44
2	Gole Market	Kirti Azad	BJP	18,935	46.79	Brij Mohan Bhama	INC	15,132	37.39	3,803	9.40
3	Minto Road	Tajdar Babar	INC	18,411	43.83	Arun Jain	BJP	16,540	39.38	1,871	4.45
4	Kasturba Nagar	Jagdish Lal Batra	BJP	25,215	55.72	Des Raj Chhabra	INC	15,159	33.50	10,056	22.22
5	Jangpura	Jag Parvesh Chandra	INC	24,200	47.40	Ram Lal Verma	BJP	21,709	42.52	2,491	4.88
6	Okhla	Parvej	JD	13,282	30.91	Hasan Ahmed	INC	11,975	27.87	1,307	3.04
7	Kalkaji	Purnima Sethi	BJP	22,468	47.51	Subhash Chopra	INC	18,456	39.03	4,012	8.48
8	Malviya Nagar	Rajendra Gupta	BJP	19,319	42.99	Yoga Nand Shastri	INC	19,061	42.41	258	0.58
9	Hauz Khas	Rajesh Sharma	BJP	18,231	44.39	Ashok Kumar Jain	INC	16,542	40.28	1,689	4.11
10	R.K.Puram	Bodh Raj	BJP	17,838	40.66	Usha Krishana Kumar	INC	16,178	36.88	1,660	3.78
11	Delhi Cantonment	Karan Singh Tanwar	BJP	23,260	59.85	Kiran Chaudhary	INC	14,391	37.03	8,869	22.82
12	Janak Puri	Jagdish Mukhi	BJP	33,905	62.54	Shailender S/o M.P. Sahi	INC	17,852	32.93	16,053	29.61
13	Hari Nagar	Harsaran Singh Balli	BJP	31,150	59.35	Onkar Singh Thapar	INC	14,251	27.15	16,899	32.20
14	Tilak Nagar	O.P Babbar	BJP	33,911	62.04	Tervinder Singh Marwah	INC	17,341	31.73	16,570	30.31
15	Rajouri Garden	Ajay Makan	INC	28,075	50.95	Manohar Lal Kumar	BJP	24,524	44.51	3,551	6.44
16	Madipur (SC)	Swarup Chand Rajan	BJP	28,861	51.10	Mala Ram Gangwal	INC	23,986	42.47	4,875	8.63
17	Tri Nagar	Nand Kishore Garg	BJP	28,872	55.55	Deep Chand Sharma	INC	20,199	38.86	8,673	16.69
18	Shakurbasti	Gauri Shankar Bhardwaj	BJP	28,933	51.45	Kamal Kant Sharma	INC	21,437	38.12	7,496	13.33
19	Shalimar Bagh	Sahib Singh Verma	BJP	40,077	65.21	S.C. Vats	INC	18,307	29.79	21,770	35.42
20	Badli	Jai Bhagwan	BJP	30,420	48.75	Rajesh Yadav	INC	20,588	32.99	9,832	15.76
21	Sahibabad Daulatpur	Jet Ram Solanki	BJP	25,372	48.02	Ishwar Singh	INC	16,676	31.56	8,696	16.46
22	Bawana (SC)	Chand Ram	BJP	18,383	35.48	Rajender Singh	JD	16,188	31.24	2,195	4.24
23	Sultanpur Majra (SC)	Jai Kishan	INC	20,890	37.75	Nand Ram Bagri	JD	13,478	24.36	7,412	13.39
24	Mangolpuri (SC)	Raj Kumar Chauhan	INC	21,344	41.50	Soran Singh Nirala	BJP	13,681	26.60	7,663	14.90
25	Nangloi Jat	Davinder Singh	BJP	28,427	54.13	Bharat Singh	INC	16,287	31.02	12,140	23.11
26	Vishnu Garden	Mahinder Singh Saathi	INC	17,962	35.46	Daya Nand Chandila	IND	12,252	24.18	5,710	11.28
27	Hastsal	Mukesh Sharma	INC	25,193	36.97	Kamla Choudhary	BJP	17,723	26.01	7,470	10.96
28	Najafgarh	Suraj Parshad	IND	19,582	35.23	Ran Singh	BJP	14,203	25.55	5,379	9.68
29	Nasirpur	Vinod Kumar Sharma	BJP	23,070	38.76	Inder Singh Solanki	INC	21,012	35.31	2,058	3.45
30	Palam	Dharam Dev Solanki	BJP	20,671	41.23	Mukhtyar Singh	INC	16,613	33.13	4,058	8.10
31	Mahipalpur	Sat Parkash Rana	BJP	17,848	36.27	Vijay Singh Lochav	INC	14,706	29.89	3,142	6.38
32	Mehrauli	Brahm Singh Tanwar	BJP	24,396	46.27	Balram Singh Tanwar	INC	17,375	32.95	7,021	13.32
33	Saket	Tek Chand S/o Dhanpat Sharma	INC	13,687	32.38	Raj Rawat	BJP	12,938	30.61	749	1.77
34	Dr. Ambedkar Nagar (SC)	Prem Singh	INC	19,621	43.85	Rajender Kumar Sonker	BJP	11,056	24.71	8,565	19.14
35	Tughlakabad	Shish Pal	IND	14,683	30.52	Shyama Sinha	INC	12,151	25.25	2,532	5.27
36	Badarpur	Ram Vir Singh Bidhuri	JD	22,102	41.61	Ram Singh Netaji	INC	15,036	28.31	7,066	13.30
37	Trilok Puri (SC)	Brahm Pal	INC	17,844	37.26	Ram Charan Gujrati	BJP	14,989	31.30	2,855	5.96
38	Patpar Ganj (SC)	Gyan Chand	BJP	17,020	35.69	Amrish Singh Goutam	JD	14,873	31.18	2,147	4.51
39	Mandawali	M.S. Panwar	BJP	20,872	46.51	Ashu Tosh Upreti	INC	12,273	27.35	8,599	19.16
40	Geeta Colony	A.K. Walia	INC	27,265	49.90	Rahdey Sham	BJP	24,394	44.65	2,871	5.25
41	Gandhi Nagar	Darshan Kumar Bahl	BJP	23,093	46.76	Pyare Lal Ghee Waley	INC	20,176	40.86	2,917	5.90
42	Krishna Nagar	Harsh Vardhan	BJP	30,537	53.94	Balvinder Singh	INC	18,118	32.00	12,419	21.94
43	Vishwash Nagar	Madan Lal Gawa	BJP	27,711	50.47	Abjit Singh Gulati	INC	21,151	38.53	6,560	11.94
44	Shahdara	Ram Niwas Goyal	BJP	28,253	53.32	Chaman Lal Yadav	INC	16,086	30.36	12,167	22.96
45	Seemapuri (SC)	Balbir Singh	BJP	14,579	38.80	Giri Lal	INC	12,817	34.11	1,762	4.69
46	Nand Nagari (SC)	Fateh Singh	BJP	13,429	30.18	Rup Chand	INC	12,648	28.42	781	1.76
47	Rohtas Nagar	Alok Kumar	BJP	24,324	47.12	Babu Krishan Lal	INC	16,508	31.98	7,816	15.14
48	Babarpur	Naresh Gaur	BJP	21,023	53.32	Bhopal Singh	INC	5,722	14.51	15,301	38.81
49	Seelampur	Matin Ahmed	JD	16,518	42.54	Jai Kishan Dassgupta	BJP	15,080	38.84	1,438	3.70
50	Ghonda	Lal Behari Tiwari	BJP	21,614	48.80	Dhiraj Singh	INC	13,841	31.25	7,773	17.55
51	Yamuna Vihar	Sahab Singh Chauhan	BJP	23,665	48.63	Bhisham Sharma	INC	13,211	27.15	10,454	21.48
52	Qarawal Nagar	Ram Pal	BJP	18,322	29.97	Kalyan Singh	INC	12,816	20.96	5,506	9.01
53	Wazirpur	Deep Chand Bandhu	INC	26,150	43.13	Mange Ram Garg	BJP	25,671	42.34	479	0.79
54	Narela (SC)	Inder Raj Singh	BJP	18,386	42.01	Charan Singh Kendera	INC	10,733	24.53	7,653	17.48
55	Bhalswa Jahangirpur	Jitendra Kumar	IND	21,946	36.75	Ramphal Tyagi	BJP	14,124	23.65	7,822	13.10
56	Adarsh Nagar	Jai Parkash Yadav	BJP	17,020	34.18	Mangat Ram	INC	16,980	34.10	40	0.08
57	Pahar Ganj	Satish Chandra Khandelwal	BJP	22,889	41.76	Hari Chand Verma	INC	18,875	34.44	4,014	7.32
58	Matia Mahal	Shoaib Iqbal	JD	27,617	62.77	Begum Khurshid	BJP	7,672	17.44	19,945	45.33
59	Balli Maran	Haroon Yusuf	INC	20,217	39.03	Vishambhar Dutt Sharma	BJP	18,726	36.15	1,491	2.88
60	Chandni Chowk	Vasdev Kaptain	BJP	25,910	50.56	M.M. Agarwal	INC	21,456	41.87	4,454	8.69
61	Timarpur	Rajender Gupta	BJP	27,232	50.57	Hari Shanker Gupta	INC	22,176	41.18	5,056	9.39
62	Model Town	Chatri Lal Goel	BJP	23,870	44.29	Kanwar Karan Singh	INC	21,532	39.95	2,338	4.34
63	Kamla Nagar	P.K. Chandla	BJP	28,450	51.07	Rajinder Sharma	INC	22,429	40.26	6,021	10.81
64	Sadar Bazar	Hari Krishan	BJP	27,125	46.93	Harcharan Singh Joshi	INC	25,786	44.61	1,339	2.32
65	Moti Nagar	Madan Lal Khurana	BJP	33,503	54.10	Anjali Ram	INC	24,365	39.34	9,138	14.76
66	Patel Nagar	M.R Arya	BJP	24,058	44.85	Manohar Arora	INC	21,911	40.85	2,147	4.00
67	Rajinder Nagar	Puran Chand Yogi	BJP	23,847	47.75	Brahmi Yadav	INC	22,234	44.52	1,613	3.23
68	Karol Bagh (SC)	S.P. Ratwal	BJP	26,794	51.73	Sunderwati Naval Prabhakar	INC	15,405	29.74	11,389	21.99
69	Ram Nagar (SC)	Moti Lal Soddi	BJP	23,181	43.01	Babu Ram Solanki	INC	19,760	36.66	3,421	6.35
70	Baljit Nagar (SC)	Krishan Tirath	INC	21,796	47.51	K.C. Ravi	BJP	20,211	44.05	1,585	3.46

== See also ==
- First Legislative Assembly of Delhi
- Second Legislative Assembly of Delhi
- Third Legislative Assembly of Delhi
- Fourth Legislative Assembly of Delhi
- Fifth Legislative Assembly of Delhi
- Sixth Legislative Assembly of Delhi
