= Council of Ministers =

Name for the supreme executive in some countries

Council of Ministers is a traditional name given to the supreme executive organ in some governments, which advises the chief executive or head of state. It is usually equivalent to the term cabinet. The term Council of State is a similar name that also may refer to a cabinet, but the terms are not equal in certain countries (for example, in Spain and India). Councils of Ministers are usually composed of those government ministers who are responsible for a ministry. They are usually led by a President of the Council of Ministers, a term that is commonly translated, or used synonymously, as prime minister or premier.

== List of current Councils of Ministers ==
- Council of Ministers of Albania
- Council of Ministers of Algeria
- Council of Ministers of Belarus
- Council of Ministers of Belgium
- Council of Ministers of Bhutan
- Council of Ministers of Gibraltar
- Council of Ministers of Bosnia and Herzegovina
- Council of Ministers of Brazil
- Council of Ministers of Bulgaria
- Council of Ministers of Cambodia
- Council of Ministers of Colombia
- Council of Ministers of Cuba
- Council of Ministers of Ethiopia
- Council of Ministers of France
- Council of Ministers of Guatemala
- Council of Ministers of India
- Council of Ministers of the Isle of Man
- Council of Ministers of Italy
- Council of Ministers (Iraq)
- Council of Ministers of Jersey
- Council of Ministers of Lebanon
- Council of Ministers of Mozambique
- Council of Ministers of Nepal
- Council of Ministers of the Netherlands
  - Council of Ministers of the Kingdom of the Netherlands
- Council of Ministers of Peru
- Council of Ministers of Poland
- Council of Ministers of Portugal
- Council of Ministers of Russia
- Council of Ministers of Saudi Arabia
- Council of Ministers of Somalia
- Council of Ministers of Spain
- Council of Ministers of Syria
- Council of Ministers of Thailand
- Council of Ministers of Turkey
- Council of Ministers of Vietnam

== List of former Councils of Ministers ==
- Council of Ministers of Afghanistan
- Council of Ministers of Burma
- Council of Ministers of the German Democratic Republic
- Council of Ministers of the Hungarian People's Republic
- Council of Ministers of the Soviet Union
- Council of Ministers of the Ukrainian SSR
- Council of Ministers of the Kingdom of Serbs, Slovenes, and Croats

== See also ==
- Council of the European Union (informally known as the Council of Ministers)
- Policy Council of Guernsey
