= Vijai Kapoor =

Indian civil servant

16th Lieutenant Governor of Delhi
- In office 20 April 1998 – 9 June 2004
- Preceded by: Tejendra Khanna
- Succeeded by: Banwari Lal Joshi

Vijai Kapoor is a former IAS officer and was Lieutenant Governor of Delhi from 20 April 1998 to 9 June 2004. Currently he is director at Gujarat State Fertilizers and Chemicals Limited.

Government offices
Preceded by Tejendra Khanna	Lieutenant Governor of Delhi; 20 April 1998 – 9 June 2004	Succeeded by Banwari Lal Joshi
