= List of Representatives of Delhi =

Delhi, officially the National Capital Territory of Delhi is a union territory in India, which also includes the national capital city of New Delhi. Delhi has been represented by multiple legislators, administrators, executives, civil servants, politicians and local level activists throughout its history.

This article lists the representatives of Delhi from 1911, when Delhi was given its current boundaries.

== During the British Raj (1911–1947) ==
In 1911, the then King George V in Delhi Durbar announced that the capital of India will shift from Calcutta to Delhi. It also led to Delhi separating from Punjab Province. The region was officially called the Chief Commissioner's Province of Delhi. Through Government of India Act 1919, many provinces got a Legislative council but Chief Commissioner's provinces were deprived of it. The Chief Commissioner of Delhi was the Administrative and Judicial head of the province with no checks and balances except for the appointment by Governor General/Viceroy of British India.

List of Chief Commissioners of the Chief Commissioner's Province of Delhi
#	Name	Term		Appointed by
#	Name	Start	End	Appointed by
1	William Malcolm Hailey	1 October 1912	7 November 1918	Lord Hardinge
2	Claud Alexander Barron	7 November 1918	31 March 1924	Lord Chelmsford
3	Evelyn Robins Abbott	31 March 1924	15 April 1926	Lord Reading
4	Alexander Montague Stow	15 April 1926	29 March 1928	Lord Irwin
Acting	John Nesbitt Gordon Johnson	29 March 1928	7 August 1928	Lord Irwin
5	John Perronet Thompson	8 August 1928	21 March 1932	Lord Irwin
6	John Nesbitt Gordon Johnson	21 March 1932	21 March 1937	Lord Willingdon
7	Evan Meredith Jenkins	21 March 1937	1 July 1940	Lord Linlithgow
8	Arthur Vivian Askwith	1 July 1940	6 September 1945	Lord Linlithgow
9	William Christie	6 September 1945	14 August 1947	Lord Wavell

=== Constituent Assembly of India (December 1946 – 25 January 1950) ===
The Constituent Assembly of India was responsible for making the Constitution for the newly Independent India.

Chief Commissioner of Delhi sent the freedom fighter Deshbandhu Gupta to represent Delhi in the Constituent Assembly.

== Under the Dominion of India (1947–1950) ==
Between 15 August 1947 (the date of the Partition of India) and 25 January 1950 (the date from which the Constitution of India was enforced), India was a dominion under the British Crown. The Chief Commissioner's Province of Delhi was still controlled by the Chief Commissioner but appointed by an Indian Governor General, not a British.

List of Chief Commissioners of the Chief Commissioner's Province of Delhi
Name	Term		Appointed by
Name	Start	End	Appointed by
*No Data Available	15 August 1947	1948 (Date unknown)	Chakravarti Rajagopalachari
Sir Shankar Prasada	1948 (Date unknown)	25 January 1950	Chakravarti Rajagopalachari

== Under the Republic of India ==
=== Delhi (1950–1956) ===
Delhi was a Type-C state until 1956, which gave Delhi a Chief Commissioner appointed by the President of India (Head of State), a State Legislative Assembly (Local-level Legislature) and a place in both Houses of Parliament.

==== Chief Commissioners (1950–1956) ====
List of Chief Commissioners in the state of Delhi
Name	Term		Appointed by
Name	Start	End	Appointed by
Shankar Prasada	26 January 1950	1954 (Date unknown)	Dr. Rajendra Prasad
Anand Dattahaya Pandit	1954 (Date unknown)	31 October 1956	Dr. Rajendra Prasad

===== Legislative Assembly of Delhi (1952–1956) =====
Delhi, with entire India, voted for the first time for the national elections to choose a democratically elected government for the first time. The state assembly elections were held with the national elections and 1st Delhi Legislative Assemblywas formed by the winners of the election in each constituency.

S.No.	Constituency	Member	Party
1	Kotla Feroze Shah	Shanta Vasisht	INC
2	Parliament Street	Kaushaleshwar Prasad Shankara	INC
3	Safdar Jang	Daljit Singh	INC
4	Lodhi Road	Shiva Nandan Rishi	INC
5	Puran Qilla Viney Nagar	Pushpa Devi	INC
6	Delhi Cantt	Raghvendra Singh	INC
7	Reading Road	Amin Chand	BJS
8	Reading Road	Prafulla Ranjan Chakravarty	INC
9	Chittar Gupta	Kartar Singh	INC
10	Mantola	Mushtaq Rai	INC
11	Ram Nagar	Shankar Lal	INC
12	Jhanday Walan	Ghardhari Lal Salwan	BJS
13	Kashmere Gate	Bhagwan Dass	INC
14	Chandni Chowk	Yudhvir Singh	INC
15	Phatak Habash Khan	Harkishan Lal	INC
16	Maliwara	Anand Raj	INC
17	Ballimaran	Sultan Yar Khan	INC
18	Chawri Bazar	Nuruddin Ahmad	INC
19	Ajmeri Gate	Shafiq Ur Rehman Kidwai	INC
20	Sita Ram Bazar Turkman Gate	Shiv Charan Dass	INC
21	Sita Ram Bazar Turkman Gate	Sudershan Singh	INC
22	Kucha Chelan	Mushtaq Ahmad	SP
23	Darya Ganj	Gurmukh Nihal Singh	INC
24	Chandrawal	Hukam Singh	INC
25	Roshanara	Jagan Nath	INC
26	Arya Pura	Mangal Dass	INC
27	Tokriwalan	Gopinath	INC
28	Deputy Ganj	Sham Charan	BJS
29	Pahari Dhiraj Basti Jullahan	Hem Chand Jain	INC
30	Pahari Dhiraj Basti Jullahan	Dhanpat Rai	INC
31	Manak Pura	B.D. Joshi	SP
32	Tibbia College	Ram Singh	ABHM
33	Naiwala	Dilawar Singh	BJS
34	Rehgar Pura Dev Nagar	Daya Ram	INC
35	Rehgar Pura Dev Nagar	Sushila Nayar	INC
36	Kishan Ganj Anad Parbat	Jag Pravesh Chandra	INC
37	Civil Lines	Krishna	INC
38	Kingsway Camp	Jang bahadur Singh	BJS
39	Wazirabad	Fateh Singh	INC
40	Shahdara	Chinta Mani	INC
41	Narela	Mange Ram	INC
42	Narela	Prabhu Dayal	INC
43	Nangloi	Chaudhary Brahm Prakash	INC
44	Khanjhawla	Bhup Singh	IND
45	Isa Pur	Subedat Hati Singh	INC
46	Najaf Garh	Ajit Singh	INC
47	Mehrauli	Mitter Sen	INC
48	Mehrauli	Sukh Dev	INC

===== Members in Parliament =====
Provisional Parliament (26 January 1950 – 17 April 1952) As Constituent Assembly completed the task of making the constitution, it converted itself into a Provisional Parliament, which shall work until the first democratic elections in India take place.

Deshbandhu Gupta represented Delhi in the parliament from 26 January 1950 until his death on 21 November 1951. As the procedure for the first national elections had started, his office remained vacant and Delhi had no representative for the remaining tenure of the parliament. 1st Lok Sabha After nationwide elections, 1st Lok Sabha was formed in 1952.

Delhi sent 4 members from its 3 constituencies

Representatives of Delhi in 1st Lok Sabha
Constituency	Member	Party
New Delhi	Sucheta Kriplani	KMPP
Delhi City	Radha Raman	INC
Outer Delhi	Naval Prabhakar	INC
Outer Delhi	C. Krishnan Nayar	INC

Rajya Sabha members from Delhi

Delhi was given 1 Rajya Sabha seat.

Representatives of Delhi in Rajya Sabha
Member	Party	Term		Note
Member	Party	Start	End	Note
Onkar Nath	INC	3 April 1952	16 April 1955	Resigned
Vacant		17 April 1955	12 May 1955	
Mehr Chand Khanna	INC	13 May 1955	14 December 1956	Resigned
Delhi as a state stopped existing from 1 November 1956

=== Union Territory of Delhi (1956–1992) ===
States Reorganisation Act, 1956 made Delhi a Union Territory without Legislature. Though the Union Territory retained its right to send representatives in both the Houses of Parliament. Rajya Sabha members were sent via elections in Delhi Municipal/Metropolitan Council and Lok Sabha members were sent through direct elections. The Chief Commissioner of Delhi was still the head of the state until 1966 when the office was replaced by the office of the Lieutenant Governor of Delhi.

==== Chief Commissioner of the Union Territory of Delhi ====
* Exact date unknown
Name	Civil Services	Term		Appointed by
Name	Civil Services	Start	End	Appointed by
Anand Dattahaya Pandit	Indian Civil Service	1 November 1956	*1959	Dr. Rajendra Prasad
Bhagwan Sahay	Indian Civil Service	*1959	*1963	Dr. Rajendra Prasad
Venkata Vishwanathan	Indian Civil Service	*1964	6 September 1966	Sarvepalli Radhakrishnan
Aditya Nath Jha	Indian Civil Service	7 September 1966	3 June 1966	Sarvepalli Radhakrishnan

Lieutenant Governor of the Union Territory of Delhi (1966–1991) Delhi Administration Act, 1966 established the office of Lieutenant Governor of Delhi which replaced the office of Chief Commissioner of Delhi.

#	Officeholder	Associated Armed/Civil Services	Term		Appointed by (President of India)
#	Officeholder	Associated Armed/Civil Services	Start	End	Appointed by (President of India)
1	Aditya Nath Jha	Indian Civil Service	7 November 1966	19 January 1972	Sarvepalli Radhakrishnan
Acting	M.C. Pimputkar	Indian Civil Service	19 January 1972	23 April 1972	V. V. Giri
2	Baleshwar Prasad	Indian Administrative Service	24 April 1972	3 October 1974	V. V. Giri
3	Krishan Chand	Indian Civil Service	3 October 1974	30 March 1978	Fakhruddin Ali Ahmed
4	Dalip Rai Kohli	Indian Civil Service	30 March 1978	17 February 1980	Neelam Sanjiva Reddy
5	Jagmohan Malhotra	Indian Administrative Service	17 February 1980	30 March 1981	Neelam Sanjiva Reddy
6	Sundar Lal Khurana	Indian Administrative Service	30 March 1981	2 September 1982	Neelam Sanjiva Reddy
(5)	Jagmohan Malhotra	Indian Administrative Service	2 September 1982	25 April 1984	Zail Singh
7	P. G. Gavai	Indian Administrative Service	25 April 1984	November 1984	Zail Singh
8	Mohan M.K. Wali	Indian Administrative Service	November 1984	November 1985	Zail Singh
9	H. L. Kapur	Air Vice Marshal	16 November 1985	3 August 1988	Zail Singh
9	H. L. Kapur	Param Vishisht Seva Medal	16 November 1985	3 August 1988	Zail Singh
9	H. L. Kapur	Ati Vishisht Seva Medal	16 November 1985	3 August 1988	Zail Singh
10	Romesh Bhandari	Indian Foreign Service	4 August 1988	11 December 1989	Ramaswamy Venkataraman
11	Arjan Singh	Marshal of the Air Force	12 December 1989	December 1990	Ramaswamy Venkataraman
11	Arjan Singh	Distinguished Flying Cross	12 December 1989	December 1990	Ramaswamy Venkataraman
12	Markandey Singh	Indian Police Service	December 1990	2 February 1992	Ramaswamy Venkataraman

==== Members of Parliament from the Union Territory of Delhi ====
Lok Sabha
Lok Sabha	Constituency	Member	Party	Note
1	Delhi City	Radha Raman	INC	
1	Outer Delhi	Naval Prabhakar	INC	Outer Delhi was a Double Member Constituency, and the last one in Delhi Since then, all constituencies are single-member
1	Outer Delhi	C. Krishnan Nayar	INC	Outer Delhi was a Double Member Constituency, and the last one in Delhi Since then, all constituencies are single-member
1	New Delhi	Sucheta Kriplani	INC	
2	New Delhi	Sucheta Kriplani	INC	Resigned
2	New Delhi	Balraj Madhok	BJS	Elected in 1961 by-election, served remaining term
2	Outer Delhi (SC)	Naval Prabhakar	INC	
2	Outer Delhi	C. Krishnan Nair	INC	
3	Outer Delhi	Chowdhury Brahm Perkash	INC	
3	Chandni Chowk	Sham Nath	INC	
3	Delhi Sadar	Shiv Charan Gupta	INC	
3	Karol Bagh (SC)	Naval Prabhakar	INC	
3	New Delhi	Mehr Chand Khanna	INC	
4	Outer Delhi (SC)	Chowdhury Brahm Perkash	INC	
4	Chandni Chowk	Ram Gopal Shawlwale	BJS	
4	Delhi Sadar	Kanwar Lal Gupta	BJS	
4	East Delhi	Hardayal Devgun	BJS	
4	Karol Bagh (SC)	R. S. Vidyarthi	BJS	
4	New Delhi	Manohar Lal Sondhi	BJS	
4	South Delhi	Balraj Madhok	BJS	
5	Chandani Chowk	Subhadra Joshi	INC	
5	Delhi Sadar	Amar Nath Chawla	INC	
5	East Delhi	H.K.L. Bhagat	INC(I)	
5	Karol Bagh (SC)	T. Sohan Lal	INC	
5	New Delhi	Krishna Chandra Pant	INC(I)	
5	New Delhi	Mukul Banerjee	INC	
5	Outer Delhi (SC)	Chaudhry Dalip Singh	INC	
5	South Delhi	Shashi Bhushan	INC	
6	New Delhi	Atal Bihari Vajpayee	BLD	
6	South Delhi	Vijay Kumar Malhotra	BLD	
6	Outer Delhi	Brahm Perkash	BLD	
6	East Delhi	Kishore Lal	BLD	
6	Chandni Chowk	Sikander Bakht	BLD	
6	Delhi Sadar	Kanwar Lal Gupta	BLD	
6	Karol Bagh (SC)	Shiv Narain Sarsonia	BLD	
7	New Delhi	Atal Bihari Vajpayee	JP	Split in Janata Party forms Bharatiya Janata Party
7	New Delhi	Atal Bihari Vajpayee	BJP	Split in Janata Party forms Bharatiya Janata Party
7	South Delhi	Charanjit Singh (West Friends Colony)	INC	
7	Outer Delhi	Sajjan Kumar	INC	
7	East Delhi	H. K. L. Bhagat	INC	
7	Chandni Chowk	Bhiku Ram Jain	INC	
7	Delhi Sadar	Jagdish Tytler	INC	
7	Karol Bagh (SC)	Dharam Dass Shastri	INC	
8	Delhi Sadar	Jagdish Tytler	INC	
8	East Delhi	H. K. L. Bhagat	INC	
8	Karol Bagh (SC)	Sundarwati Nawal Prabhakar	INC	
8	New Delhi	Krishna Chandra Pant	INC	
8	North East Delhi	Jai Prakash Agarwal	INC	
8	Outer Delhi (SC)	Chaudhary Bharat Singh	INC	
8	South Delhi	Lalit Maken	INC	Died in 1985
8	South Delhi	Arjun Singh	INC	Won by-election in 1985, served remaining term
9	New Delhi	Lal Krishna Advani	BJP	
9	South Delhi	Madan Lal Khurana	BJP	
9	Outer Delhi	Tarif Singh	JD	
9	East Delhi	H. K. L. Bhagat	INC	
9	Chandni Chowk	Jai Prakash Aggarwal	INC	
9	Delhi Sadar	Vijay Kumar Malhotra	BJP	
9	Karol Bagh	Kalka Dass	BJP	
10	New Delhi	Lal Krishna Advani	BJP	Resigned
10	New Delhi	Rajesh Khanna	INC	Won by-election, served remaining term
10	South Delhi	Madan Lal Khurana	BJP	
10	Outer Delhi	Sajjan Kumar	INC	
10	East Delhi	Baikunth Lal Sharma	BJP	
10	Chandni Chowk	Tarachand Khandelwal	BJP	
10	Delhi Sadar	Jagdish Tytler	INC	
10	Karol Bagh	Kalka Dass	BJP	

Members representing the Union Territory of Delhi in Rajya Sabha
Name of member	Party	Tanure		Note	
Name of member	Party	Start	End	Note	
Mehr Chand Khanna	INC	13 May 1955	14 December 1956	Resigned	Represented the state of Delhi before the UT was formed
Onkar Nath	INC	24 November 1956	2 April 1960	Served 2nd term	
Begum Siddiqa Kidwai	INC	24 November 1956	2 April 1958		
S. K. Dey	INC	31 January 1957	1 March 1962	Elected in by-election to replace Mehr Chand Khanna. Served remaining term	Had to resign as he was elected to 3rd Lok Sabha from Nagpur
Begum Siddiqa Kidwai	INC	3 April 1958	3 June 1958	Died on 3 June 1958	
Ahmed Ali Mirza	Independent	17 September 1958	2 April 1964	Served 2nd term	Elected in by-election to replace Begum Siddiwa Kidwai Served remaining term
Shanta Vasisht	INC	3 April 1960	2 April 1966		
Sardar Santokh Singh	INC	16 April 1962	15 April 1968		
Shanta Vasisht	INC(O)	3 April 1966	2 April 1972	Served 2nd term	
Bhai Mahavir	BJS	16 April 1968	15 April 1974		
L. K. Advani	BJS	3 April 1970	2 April 1976		
Savita Behen	INC	3 April 1972	2 April 1978		
Khurshed Alam Khan	INC	16 April 1974	15 April 1980		
Charanjit Chanana	INC	3 April 1976	2 April 1982		
Jagannathrao Joshi	BJP	3 April 1978	2 April 1984		
Shamim Ahmed Siddiqui	INC	21 November 1983	20 November 1989		
Laxmi Narain	INC	21 November 1983	20 November 1989		
Vishwa Bandhu Gupta	INC	3 April 1984	2 April 1990		

=== National Capital Territory of Delhi (1992–present) ===
The Constitution (Sixty Ninth Amendment) Act, 1991, which came into effect from February 1, 1992, renamed the Union Territory of Delhi to the National Capital Territory of Delhi, which is also the currently used name for the region, though the region is still under the Union Territory status, it regained a Legislative Assembly and has some legislative powers. The Lieutenant Governor of the National Capital Territory of Delhi, nominated by the President of India is still the head of the state with most administrative powers. The members of Rajya Sabha from Delhi were now elected by the legislative assembly

==== Lieutenant Governors of the National Capital Territory of Delhi ====
List of Lieutenant Governors of the NCT of Delhi
#	Officeholder	Associated Armed/Civil Services	Term		Appointed by (President of India)
#	Officeholder	Associated Armed/Civil Services	Start	End	Appointed by (President of India)
1	Markandey Singh	IPS	1 February 1992	4 May 1992	Ramaswamy Venkataraman
2	Prasannabhai Karunashankar Dave	IAS	4 May 1992	4 January 1997	Ramaswamy Venkataraman
3	Tejendra Khanna	IAS	4 January 1997	20 April 1998	Shankar Dayal Sharma
4	Vijai Kapoor	IAS	20 April 1998	9 June 2004	K. R. Narayanan
5	Banwari Lal Joshi	IPS	9 June 2004	9 April 2007	Dr. A. P. J. Abdul Kalam
6	Tejendra Khanna	IAS	9 April 2007	9 July 2013	Dr. A. P. J. Abdul Kalam
7	Najeeb Jung	IAS	9 July 2013	22 December 2016	Pranab Mukherjee
8	Anil Baijal	IAS	31 December 2016	18 May 2022	Pranab Mukherjee
9	Vinai Kumar Saxena	N/A (Politician)	26 May 2022	Incumbent	Ram Nath Kovind

==== Legislative Assembly of the National Capital Territory of Delhi ====
1st Delhi Assembly
#	Assembly constituency	Name	Party
01	Adarsh Nagar	Jai Parkash Yadav	BJP
02	Ambedkar Nagar	Prem Singh	INC
03	Babarpur	Naresh Gaur	BJP
04	Badarpur	Ramvir Singh Bidhuri	JD
05	Badli	Jai Bhagwan Aggarwal	BJP
06	Baljit Nagar	Krishna Tirath	INC
07	Ballimaran	Haroon Yusuf	INC
08	Bawana	Chand Ram	BJP
09	Bhalswa Jahangirpur	Jitendra Kumar	IND
10	Chandni Chowk	Vasdev Kaptain	BJP
11	Delhi Cantonment	Karan Singh Tanwar	BJP
12	Gandhi Nagar	Darshan Kumar Bahl	BJP
13	Geeta Colony	Ashok Kumar Walia	INC
14	Ghonda	Lal Bihari Tiwari	BJP
15	Gole Market	Kirti Azad	BJP
16	Hari Nagar	Harsharan Singh Balli	BJP
17	Hastsal	Mukesh Sharma	INC
18	Hauz Khas	Rajesh Sharma	BJP
19	Janakpuri	Jagdish Mukhi	BJP
20	Jangpura Jag	Parvesh Chandra	INC
21	Kalkaji	Purnima Sethi	BJP
22	Kamla Nagar	P.K. Chandla	BJP
23	Karol Bagh	Surender Pal Ratawal	BJP
24	Kasturba Nagar	Jagdish Lal Batra	BJP
25	Krishna Nagar	Harsh Vardhan	BJP
26	Madipur	Swarup Chand Rajan	BJP
27	Mahipalpur	Sat Parkash Rana	BJP
28	Malviya Nagar	Rajendra Gupta	BJP
29	Mandawali	M.S. Panwar	BJP
30	Mangol Puri	Raj Kumar Chauhan	INC
31	Matia Mahal	Shoaib Iqbal	JD
32	Mehrauli	Brahm Singh Tanwar	BJP
33	Minto Road	Tajdar Babar	INC
34	Model Town	Chatri Lal Goel	BJP
35	Moti Nagar	Madan Lal Khurana	BJP
36	Najafgarh	Suraj Parshad	IND
37	Nand Nagari	Fateh Singh	BJP
38	Nangloi Jat	Devender Singh Shokeen	BJP
39	Narela	Inder Raj Singh	BJP
40	Nasirpur	Vinod Kumar Sharma	BJP
41	Okhla	Parvez Hashmi	JD
42	Pahar Ganj	Satish Khandelwal	BJP
43	Palam	Dharam Dev Solanki	BJP
44	Patel Nagar	M.R. Arya	BJP
45	Patparganj	Gyan Chand	BJP
46	Qarawal Nagar	Ram Pal	BJP
47	R K Puram	Bodh Raj	BJP
48	Rajinder Nagar	Puran Chand Yogi	BJP
49	Rajouri Garden	Ajay Maken	INC
50	Ram Nagar	Moti Lal Soddi	BJP
51	Rohtas Nagar	Alok Kumar	BJP
52	Sadar Bazar	Hari Krishan	BJP
53	Sahibabad Daulatpur	Jet Ram Solanki	BJP
54	Saket	Tek Chand	INC
55	Sarojini Nagar	Ram Bhaj	BJP
56	Seelampur	Mateen Ahmed	JD
57	Seemapuri	Balbir Singh	BJP
58	Shahdara	Ram Niwas Goel	BJP
59	Shakur Basti	Gauri Shankar Bhardwaj	BJP
60	Shalimar Bagh	Sahib Singh Verma	BJP
61	Sultan Pur Majra	Jai Kishan	INC
62	Tilak Nagar	O.P Babbar	BJP
63	Timarpur	Rajender Gupta	BJP
64	Tri Nagar	Nand Kishore Garg	BJP
65	Trilokpuri	Brahm Pal	INC
66	Tughlakabad	Shish Pal	IND
67	Vishnu Garden	Mahinder Singh Saathi	INC
68	Vishwas Nagar	Madan Lal Gawa	BJP
69	Wazirpur	Deep Chand Bandhu	INC
70	Yamuna Vihar	Sahab Singh Chauhan	BJP

2nd Delhi Assembly
#	Assembly constituency	Name	Party
01	Adarsh Nagar	Mangat Ram Singhal	INC
02	Ambedkar Nagar	Prem Singh	INC
03	Babarpur	Naresh Gaur	BJP
04	Badarpur	Ram Singh Netaji	IND
05	Badli	Jai Bhagwan Aggarwal	BJP
06	Baljit Nagar	Krishna	INC
07	Ballimaran	Haroon Yusuf	INC
08	Bawana	Surender Kumar	INC
09	Bhalswa Jahangirpur	J. S. Chauhan	INC
10	Chandni Chowk	Parlad Singh Sawhney	INC
11	Delhi Cantt	Kiran Chaudhri	INC
12	Gandhi Nagar	Arvinder Singh Lovely	INC
13	Geeta Colony	Ashok Kumar Walia	INC
14	Ghonda	Bheeshm Sharma	INC
15	Gole Market	Sheila Dikshit	INC
16	Hari Nagar	Harsharan Singh Balli	BJP
17	Hastsal	Mukesh Sharma	INC
18	Hauz Khas	Sushma Swaraj	BJP
19	Janakpuri	Prof. Jagdish Mukhi	BJP
20	Jangpura	Tarvinder Singh Marwah	INC
21	Kalkaji	Subhash Chopra	INC
22	Kamla Nagar	Shadi Ram	INC
23	Karol Bagh	Motilal Bokolia	INC
24	Kasturba Nagar	Shushil Choudhary	BJP
25	Krishna Nagar	Dr. Harsh Vardhan	BJP
26	Madipur	Mala Ram Gangwal	INC
27	Mahipalpur	Mahender Singh	INC
28	Malviya Nagar	Dr. Yoganand Shastri	INC
29	Mandawali	Meera Bhardwaj	INC
30	Mangol Puri	Raj Kumar Chauhan	INC
31	Matia Mahal	Shoaib Iqbal	JD(U)
32	Minto Road	Tajdar Babar	INC
33	Mehrauli	Bhram Singh Tanvar	BJP
34	Model Town	Kanwar Karan Singh	INC
35	Moti Nagar	Avinash Shahni	BJP
36	Najafgarh	Kanwal Singh	INC
37	Nand Nagari	Roop Chand	INC
38	Nangloi Jat	Prem Chand	INC
39	Nerela	Charan Singh Kandera	INC
40	Nasirpur	Mahabal Mishra	INC
41	Okhla	Parvez Hashmi	INC
42	Pahar Ganj	Anjali Rai	INC
43	Palam	Mahendar Yadav	INC
44	Patel Nagar	Rama Kant Goswami	INC
45	Patparganj	Amrish Singh Gautam	INC
46	Qarawal Nagar	Mohan Singh Bist	BJP
47	Ram Nagar	Darshna	INC
48	R. K. Puram	Ashok Singh	INC
49	Rajinder Nagar	Puran Chand Yogi	BJP
50	Rajouri Garden	Ajay Maken	INC
51	Rohtas Nagar	Radhey Shyam Khanna	INC
52	Sadar Bazar	Rajesh Jain	INC
53	Sahibabad Daulatpur	Ramesh Kumar	INC
54	Saket	Tek Chand Sharma	INC
55	Sarojini Nagar	Ram Bhaj	BJP
56	Seelampur	Mateen Ahmed	INC
57	Seema Puri	Veer Singh Dhingan	INC
58	Shahdara	Narender Nath	INC
59	Shakur Basti	S. C. Vats	INC
60	Shalimar Bagh	Ravinder Nath	BJP
61	Sultanpur	Sushila Devi	INC
62	Tilak Nagar	Jaspal Singh	INC
63	Timarpur	Jagdish Anand	INC
64	Tri Nagar	Nand Kishore Garg	BJP
65	Trilokpuri	Bhrampal	INC
66	Tughlakabad	Shish Pal Singh	INC
67	Vishnu Garden	Mahinder Singh Saathi	INC
68	Vishwas Nagar	Naseeb Singh	INC
69	Wazirpur	Deep Chand Bandhu	INC
70	Yamuna Vihar	Shahab Singh Chauhan	BJP
