= Chandni Chowk Lok Sabha constituency =

Lok Sabha Constituency in Delhi

Coordinates: 28.6610°N 77.2270°E

Chandni Chowk DL-1
- Lok Sabha constituency
- Interactive Map Outlining Chandni Chowk Lok Sabha constituency

Constituency details
- Country: India
- Region: North India
- Union Territory: Delhi
- Assembly constituencies: Adarsh Nagar; Shalimar Bagh; Shakur Basti; Tri Nagar; Wazirpur; Model Town; Sadar Bazar; Chandni Chowk; Matia Mahal; Ballimaran
- Established: 1956
- Reservation: None

Member of Parliament
- 18th Lok Sabha
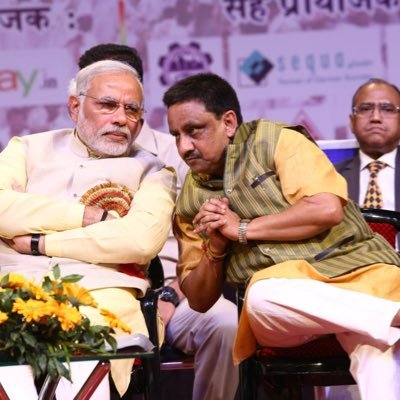
- Incumbent Praveen Khandelwal
- Party: BJP
- Alliance: NDA
- Elected year: 2024

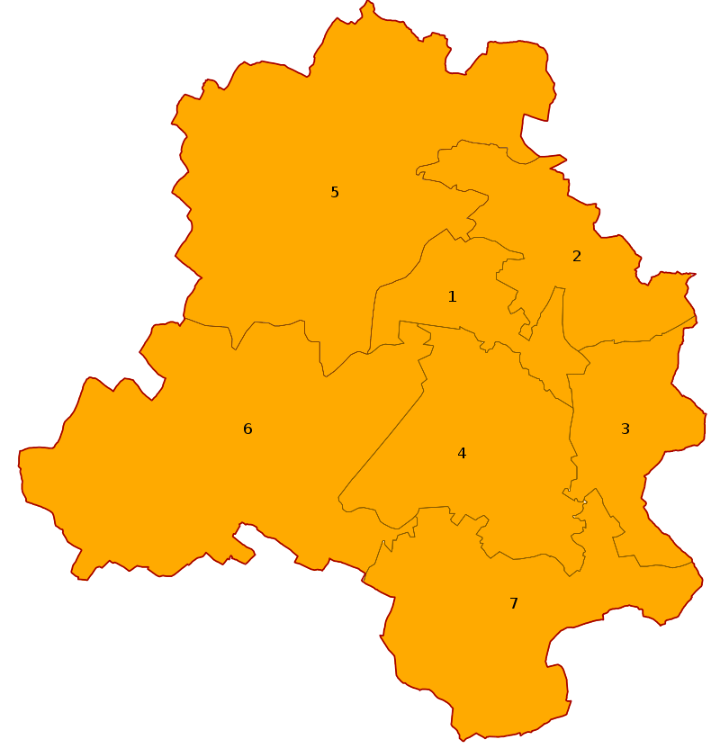
Political Map of Delhi showing Parliamentary constituencies as of 2024 elections.

Chandni Chowk Lok Sabha constituency is one of the seven Lok Sabha (parliamentary) constituencies in the Indian National Capital Territory of Delhi. This constituency came into existence in 1956. It is the smallest constituency of Lok Sabha in terms of area.

== Assembly segments ==
Following the delimitation of the parliamentary constituencies, since 2008, it comprises the following Delhi Vidhan Sabha segments:

#	Name	District	Member	Party	Leading (in 2024)
4	Adarsh Nagar	North Delhi	Raj Kumar Bhatia	BJP	BJP
14	Shalimar Bagh	North West Delhi	Rekha Gupta	BJP	BJP
15	Shakur Basti	North Delhi	Karnail Singh	BJP	BJP
16	Tri Nagar	North West Delhi	Tilak Ram Gupta	BJP	BJP
17	Wazirpur	North Delhi	Poonam Sharma	BJP	BJP
18	Model Town	North Delhi	Ashok Goel	BJP	BJP
19	Sadar Bazar	Central Delhi	Som Dutt	AAP	BJP
20	Chandni Chowk	Central Delhi	Parlad Singh Sawhney	AAP	INC
21	Matia Mahal	Central Delhi	Shoaib Iqbal	AAP	INC
22	Ballimaran	Central Delhi	Imran Hussain	AAP	INC

From 1993 to 2008, it comprised the following Delhi Vidhan Sabha segments:

1. Pahar Ganj
2. Matia Mahal (Polling stations 1-83)
3. Ballimaran
4. Chandni Chowk
5. Minto Road (Polling station 136)
6. Ram Nagar (Polling stations 104–112)

From 1966 to 1993, Chandni Chowk Lok Sabha constituency comprised the following Delhi Metropolitan Council segments:

1. Civil Lines
2. Chandni Chowk
3. Ballimaran
4. Ajmeri Gate
5. Kucha Pati Ram
6. Matia Mahal
7. Pahar Ganj
8. Qasabpura

== Members of Parliament ==
The Chandni Chowk Lok Sabha constituency was created in 1957. The list of Member of Parliament (MP) is as follows:

Year	Member	Party
1957	Radha Raman	Indian National Congress
1962	Sham Nath	Indian National Congress
1967	Ram Gopal Shalwale	Bharatiya Jana Sangh
1971	Subhadra Joshi	Indian National Congress
1977	Sikandar Bakht	Janata Party
1980	Bhiku Ram Jain	Indian National Congress (I)
1984	Jai Parkash Aggarwal	Indian National Congress
1989	Jai Parkash Aggarwal	Indian National Congress
1991	Tarachand Khandelwal	Bharatiya Janata Party
1996	Jai Parkash Aggarwal	Indian National Congress
1998	Vijay Goel	Bharatiya Janata Party
1999	Vijay Goel	Bharatiya Janata Party
2004	Kapil Sibal	Indian National Congress
2009	Kapil Sibal	Indian National Congress
2014	Harsh Vardhan	Bharatiya Janata Party
2019	Harsh Vardhan	Bharatiya Janata Party
2024	Praveen Khandelwal	Bharatiya Janata Party

== Election results ==
=== 2024 ===
2024 Indian general election: Chandni Chowk
Party	Candidate	Votes	%	±%
BJP	Praveen Khandelwal	516,496	53.45	▲0.51
INC	Jai Prakash Aggarwal	427,171	44.20	▲14.53
BSP	Abul Kalam Azad	5,829	0.60	▼0.32
NOTA	None of the above	5,563	0.58	▲0.06
Margin of victory		89,325	9.25	▼14.03
Turnout		966,102	58.68	▼5.10
BJP hold		Swing		

=== 2019 ===
2019 Indian general elections: Chandni Chowk
Party	Candidate	Votes	%	±%
BJP	Dr. Harsh Vardhan	519,055	52.94	▲8.34
INC	Jai Prakash Agarwal	2,90,910	29.67	▲11.75
AAP	Pankaj Kumar Gupta	1,44,551	14.74	▼15.98
BSP	Shahid Ali	9,026	0.92	▲0.13
RRP	Richa Katiyar	475	0.05	N/A
NOTA	None of the Above	5,133	0.52	▲0.06
Margin of victory		2,28,145	23.27	▲9.39
Turnout		9,80,814	62.78	▼5.06
BJP hold		Swing	▲8.36	

=== 16th Lok Sabha: 2014 General Elections ===
2014 Indian general elections: Chandni Chowk
Party	Candidate	Votes	%	±%
BJP	Dr. Harsh Vardhan	437,938	44.60	▲10.64
AAP	Ashutosh	301,618	30.72	New
INC	Kapil Sibal	176,206	17.95	▼41.72
Independent	Dildar Hussain Beg	28,605	2.91	N/A
NOTA	None of the Above	4,534	0.46	N/A
Majority		1,36,320	13.88	▼11.83
Turnout		9,81,863	67.84	▲12.63
BJP gain from INC		Swing	▲10.64	

=== 15th Lok Sabha: 2009 General Elections ===
2009 Indian general elections: Chandni Chowk
Party	Candidate	Votes	%	±%
INC	Kapil Sibal	465,713	59.67	▼11.49
BJP	Vijender Gupta	2,65,003	33.96	▲7.16
BSP	Mohammad Mustaqeem	26,486	3.39	▲2.59
Margin of victory		2,00,710	25.71	▼18.65
Turnout		7,80,445	55.21	▲2.17
INC hold		Swing	▼11.49	

=== 14th Lok Sabha: 2004 General Elections ===
2004 Indian general elections: Chandni Chowk
Party	Candidate	Votes	%	±%
INC	Kapil Sibal	127,395	71.17	▲35.95
BJP	Smriti Irani	47,978	26.80	▼9.39
BSP	Gian Prakash Saini	1,444	0.81	N/A
Majority		79,415	44.37	▲43.39
Turnout		179,003	53.04	▼1.24
INC gain from BJP		Swing	▲31.25	

=== 13th Lok Sabha: 1999 General Elections ===
1999 Indian general election: Chandni Chowk
Party	Candidate	Votes	%	±%
BJP	Vijay Goel	74,001	36.19	▲2.06
INC	J. P. Agarwal	72,006	35.22	▼9.70
JD(S)	Shoaib Iqbal	52,721	25.79	New
Margin of victory		1,995	0.97	▼9.81
Turnout		204,453	54.28	▼3.24
BJP hold		Swing	▲2.06	

=== 12th Lok Sabha: 1996 General Elections ===
1996 Indian general election: Chandni Chowk
Party	Candidate	Votes	%	±%
INC	J. P. Agarwal	92,634	44.92	
BJP	J. K. Jain	70,390	34.13	
JD	Viresh Pratap Chaudhry	23,225	11.26	
Margin of victory		22,244	10.78	
Turnout		206,234	57.52	
INC gain from BJP		Swing		

== See also ==
- Chandni Chowk
- Delhi City Lok Sabha constituency
- List of constituencies of the Lok Sabha
