= Satish Khandelwal =

Indian politician

Member of Delhi Legislative Assembly
- In office 1993–1998
- Succeeded by: Anjali Rai
- Constituency: Paharganj

Personal details
- Party: Bharatiya Janata Party
- Relations: Praveen Khandelwal (nephew)

Satish Chandra Khandelwal was an Indian politician from the Bharatiya Janata Party, who was a member of the Delhi Legislative Assembly between 1993 and 1998.

== Political career ==
Khandelwal was a member of the Rashtriya Swayamsevak Sangh and the Jana Sangh since 1952. He became a Municipal Councillor for 17 years at the Municipal Corporation of Delhi and later the Deputy Mayor. He was nominated to contest in the 1989 Indian general election from the Chandni Chowk constituency but lost to Jai Parkash Aggarwal of the Indian National Congress with a margin of over 9000 votes. He was again nominated to contest in the 1993 Delhi Legislative Assembly election from the Paharganj constituency and was elected, polling at 41.76% of the votes against the Indian National Congress and Janata Dal candidates who polled at 34.44% and 24.34% of the votes respectively.

Trade union leader of Praveen Khandelwal is his nephew.

== Death ==
Khandelwal died in 2019.
