= Jitender Singh Tomar =

Indian politician

MLA, Sixth Legislative Assembly of Delhi
- In office 14 February 2015 – 11 February 2020
- Preceded by: Nand Kishore Garg
- Succeeded by: Preeti Tomar
- Constituency: Tri Nagar

Personal details
- Born: 12 April 1966 (age 60) Fatehpur (V), Etah district, U.P.
- Party: Aam Aadmi Party
- Other political affiliations: Indian National Congress
- Children: 1 son 1 daughter
- Profession: Politician

Jitender Singh Tomar is an Indian politician and former cabinet minister of Home, law and justice in the Government of NCT of Delhi headed by former Chief Minister Arvind Kejriwal from which he was resigned after a Fake Degree case against him. He is a member of the Aam Aadmi Party (AAP) and represented Tri Nagar in the Sixth Legislative Assembly of Delhi.

In 2020, day before he was about to file his nomination from TriNagar for 2020 Delhi Assembly Elections, High Court gave a ruling against him where he was found guilty of Fake Degree in his 2015 nomination. As a result his election was canceled and he instead made his wife contest on behalf of him.

== Early life and education ==
Jitender Singh Tomar was born in the village of Fatehpur, Etah district, Uttar Pradesh, on 12 April 1966.

At the time of filing his 2015 election affidavit, Tomar claimed that in 1999 he obtained a LL.B. degree from Bishwanath Singh Institute of Legal Studies, Munger, affiliated to Tilka Manjhi Bhagalpur University, Bihar, which is now disputed. He was enrolled with the Bar Council of Delhi (BCD) and was self-employed.

== Political career ==
Tomar was associated with the Indian National Congress (INC). In 2013, he joined the Aam Aadmi Party (AAP) and as its candidate contested the 2013 Delhi Legislative Assembly elections from the Tri Nagar constituency. He lost by 2809 votes to Nand Kishore Garg of the Bharatiya Janata Party (BJP).

In the 2015 Delhi Legislative Assembly elections, Tomar again stood as an AAP candidate and beat Garg by 22,311 votes. On 14 February 2015, Tomar was sworn as a cabinet minister in the Government of Delhi under chief minister Arvind Kejriwal. He was given responsibility for the Home, Law and Justice, and Tourism, Art and Culture portfolios.

The Home Ministry role was taken away from Tomar in April 2015 during a period of considerable party infighting and on 9 June 2015 he resigned from his position as Law Minister after being arrested in relation to allegations that he had misrepresented his qualifications.

== Fake degree row ==
In February 2015, prior to the declaration of the election results, a petition was filed in the Delhi High Court challenging Tomar's declared university degrees. This was based on an RTI enquiry to which Avadh University had responded by saying that it had not awarded him a Bachelor of Science (BSc) degree. It was on the basis of that degree that Tomar had enrolled for his law degree course, and thus his law degree and enrolment with the Bar was invalid. The court requested more information from the concerned organisations, while Tomar now insisted that he holds a valid law degree from the Chaudhary Charan Singh University.

In March 2015, the Delhi High Court refused to disallow the petition against Tomar, expressing surprise that the filer had requested its withdrawal. The petitioner had argued that, upon reflection, the BCD could deal with the matter without recourse to the court system. Tilka Manjhi Bhagalpur University told the court that it had no record of awarding Tomar a law degree. The Chief Minister of Delhi, Kejriwal, defended Tomar over the matter and called for a "public trial" of the media, claiming it was biased against his party.

The BCD requested that Tomar produce verification of his qualifications and in May, when it determined that these were not forthcoming in a timely manner, it took a "prima facie" view that he had sought enrolment as a lawyer on basis of "forged documentation and false representation". They filed a complaint with Delhi police seeking a "detailed investigation" on the allegations and registration of a criminal case if needed.

On 27 May 2015, BNS Institute of Legal Studies, Munger, which was the college affiliated to Tilka Manjhi Bhagalpur University where the Tomar claimed to have studied LLB, told the court that Tomar was a "bona fide student". The University had already told the court in April that the Institute had been dis-affiliated in 1990.

The police went to Bhagalpur University, where they determined Tomar's law degree to be fraudulent. He was arrested on 9 June 2015 and remanded in police custody for four days. His license to practise at the Bar was suspended and he resigned as Law Minister on the same day.

During investigations, Tomar reportedly told police that his brother helped him obtain the fake degree. Police might ask Tomar's brother to join investigation since they suspect an interstate fake-degree racket. On 15 June 2015, Tomar's police custody was extended by a magisterial court. Tomar withdrew his bail plea on the following day. The case was being heard by the Supreme Court of India in 2017, shortly after Tilka Manjhi Bhagalpur University cancelled his "degree".
