= Asim Khan =

Asim Khan may refer to:

- Asim Khan (cricketer) (1962-2024), Dutch cricketer
- Asim Khan (squash player) (born 1996), Pakistani squash player
- Asim Ahmed Khan (born 1976), Indian politician
