= Dudley St Leger Hill =

Major-General Sir Dudley St Leger Hill KCB
- Born: 1790; County Carlow, Ireland
- Died: 21 February 1851 (aged 60–61); Ambala, India
- Spouse(s): Caroline Drury (m. 1819) Mary Davies (m. 1838)
- Children: 6
- Military career
- Allegiance: United Kingdom
- Branch: British Army; Portuguese Army
- Service years: 1804–1851 (Britain); 1810–1823 (Portugal)
- Rank: Major-General
- Unit: 95th Regiment of Foot
- Commands: 8th Caçadores; Portuguese Division; Lieutenant-Governor of St Lucia
- Conflicts: Napoleonic Wars; British invasions of the River Plate; Battle of Montevideo; Battle of Buenos Aires (WIA) (POW); Peninsular War; Battle of Roliça; Battle of Vimeiro; Battle of Benavente (WIA); Battle of Corunna; Battle of Talavera; Battle of Busaco; Battle of Fuentes de Oñoro; Siege of Badajoz; Battle of Salamanca; Battle of Tordesillas (POW); Battle of Vitoria; Siege of San Sebastián (WIA); Battle of Bayonne
- Awards: Knight Bachelor; Military Order of the Tower and Sword; Royal Military Order of Saint Benedict of Aviz

Major-General Sir Dudley St Leger Hill, KCB (1790 – 21 February 1851) was a British Army officer and colonial governor.

== Biography ==
Hill was born in Carlow, Ireland, the son of Dudley Hill, a solicitor of Carlow and Dublin, and his wife, Lavinia Clarges. Hill was a descendant of Captain Richard Hill, the son of Thomas Hill, the Dean of Kilkenny, who had murdered the actor William Mountford in London in 1692. Captain Hill was later pardoned by Queen Anne, settled in Wales before dying in Carlow in 1747.

Hill's service record shows that he entered the army in 1804, aged 17, at the Curragh of Kildare. On 6 September 1804, Dudley St Leger Hill was appointed an ensign in the 82nd Foot and exchanged a year after to the 95th Rifles.

Lieutenant Hill accompanied his battalion to South America in 1806, was reported to have volunteered for the forlorn hope at Montevideo (but this was later disproved), and commanded the scaling party that captured the north gate of the city during the Battle of Montevideo in 1807. He was wounded and taken prisoner in the subsequent attempt on Buenos Aires in June. He accompanied his battalion to Portugal in 1808, was present at the Battle of Roliça, was wounded at the Battle of Benavente, and present at the Battle of Corunna.

Returning to Portugal in 1809, Hill was present at the Battle of Talavera, and the operations on the Côa River. In July 1810 he was promoted to a company in the Royal West India Rangers, but remained attached to the 95th until appointed to the Portuguese army. He commanded a wing of the Loyal Lusitanian Legion at Battle of Bussaco in September 1810, and a half battalion with some British light companies at the Battle of Fuentes de Oñoro in May 1811. He commanded the 8th Caçadores at the Siege of Badajoz in April 1812, at the Battle of Salamanca in July, and in the Burgos retreat, where his battalion lost half its numbers at the passage of the Carrión, and where he was himself wounded and taken prisoner. He again commanded his battalion at the Battle of Vitoria, and at the Siege of San Sebastián in September 1813, he headed the attack of the 5th division, and received two wounds. He was also present with it at the repulse of the Battle of Bayonne in 1814. In these campaigns he was seven times wounded.

At the peace Hill returned with the Portuguese army to Portugal, and served there for some years. In 1820 he was holding a divisional command in the Portuguese service. He was made major in the new 95th Foot in December 1823, from which he exchanged to half-pay in January 1826. In 1834 he was appointed Lieutenant-Governor of Saint Lucia, and took out with him the act of emancipation of the slaves. He returned home on the occasion of his second marriage in 1838; became major-general in 1841, and, after serving on the staff in Ireland, was appointed to a divisional command in Bengal in 1848, which he held at the time of his death.

Hill was made Companion of the Order of the Bath in 1814, a Knight Bachelor in 1816, and promoted Knight Commander of the Order of the Bath in 1848. He was also appointed to Portuguese orders as a Knight of the Order of the Tower and Sword in 1815 and Commander of the Order of Aviz in 1839, and also four Portuguese medals. He was presented with a sword and two valuable pieces of plate by his native county. He was appointed to the colonelcy of the 50th Foot in 1849. He died of apoplexy at Umballa, Bengal, on 21 February 1851.

== Family ==
Hill married, first, on 15 June 1819, Caroline Drury, the third daughter of Robert Hunter of Kew, Surrey, by whom he had six children; and secondly, on 23 June 1838, Mary, widow of Mark Davies, of Turnwood, Dorset.

== Death ==
Hill's career was documented in Phillipart’s The Royal Military Calendar of 1820 and the Dictionary of National Biography, and his obituary was published in the Gentleman’s Magazine of May 1851.

== Notes ==
Government offices
Preceded by James Alexander Farquharson as Governor	Lieutenant-Governor of Saint Lucia; 1838–1839	Succeeded by Thomas Bunbury
