= Praveen Khandelwal =

Indian politician

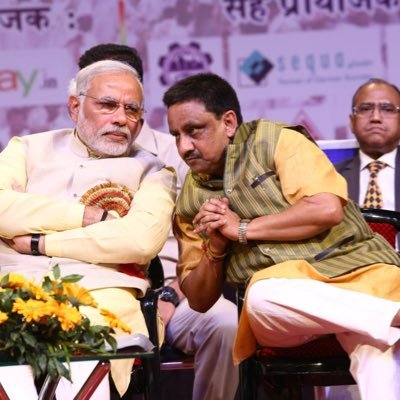

Member of Parliament, Lok Sabha
- Incumbent
- Assumed office 4 June 2024
- Preceded by: Harsh Vardhan
- Constituency: Chandni Chowk

Personal details
- Born: 1960 (age 65–66) Delhi
- Party: Bharatiya Janata Party
- Relatives: Satish Khandelwal (uncle)
- Education: Law Graduate (L.L.B.)
- Alma mater: University of Delhi

Praveen Khandelwal (born 1960) is a Delhi-based businessman and politician from the Bharatiya Janata Party and was a member of the Parliament of India who has represented Chandni Chowk in Lok Sabha, the lower house of the Indian Parliament and is the founder and secretary-general of the Confederation of All India Traders (CAIT).

He was elected as an MP candidate from Chandni Chowk seat and won by a margin of 80,000 votes defeating Congress leader J.P Aggarwal from Chandni Chowk Lok Sabha Constituency. The constituency has large number of businesses and traders. During campaigning, he promised to remain available for people and hold janta darbar on the road.

== Education ==
Khandelwal did his law graduation (LLB) from University of Delhi.

== Career ==
In 2017, Khandelwal was nominated to be a part of the government’s GST panel.

In 5 July 2021, Khandelwal was confirmed to be a member of Open Network for Digital Commerce (ONDC) as a Central Government panel's advisor.

Khandelwal launched a phase 2 campaign titled "Indian Goods - Our Pride" boycotting of Chinese goods across the country, aiming to achieve a reduction in imports of Chinese manufactured goods by 1 lakh crore (13 billion USD) by December 2021. On 15 August 2021, Independence Day of India, Khandelwal launched a new e-commerce portal Bharat-e-market to compete with incumbents Amazon India and Walmart-backed Flipkart.
