= Preeti Tomar =

Indian politician

Delhi Legislative Assembly
- In office 11 February 2020 – 2025
- Preceded by: Jitender Singh Tomar
- Succeeded by: Tilak Ram Gupta
- Constituency: Tri Nagar

Personal details
- Born: 1969 (age 56–57)
- Party: Aam Aadmi Party
- Spouse: Jitender Singh Tomar
- Education: Meerut University

Preeti Tomar (born in 1970) is an Indian politician from Delhi belonging to Aam Aadmi Party. She is a former member of the Delhi Legislative Assembly. Her husband Jitender Singh Tomar is a former member of the Delhi Legislative Assembly.

== Biography ==
Tomar completed postgraduate studies from Raghunath Girls' Post Graduate College in 1989. She received B.Ed degree from Meerut University in 1994.

Tomar was elected as a member of the Delhi Legislative Assembly from Tri Nagar on 11 February 2020. She lost in 2025.

== Electoral performance ==
=== 2025 ===
Delhi Assembly elections, 2025: Tri Nagar
Party	Candidate	Votes	%	±%
BJP	Tilak Ram Gupta	59,073	53.36	▲10.57
AAP	Preeti Tomar	43,177	39.0	▼13.38
INC	Satendra Sharma	6,897	6.2	▲2.55
NOTA	None of the above	688	0.4	
Majority		15,896	14.4	▲4.81
Turnout		1,10,009	62.4	▼4.15
BJP gain from AAP		Swing		

Delhi Assembly elections, 2020: Tri Nagar
Party	Candidate	Votes	%	±%
AAP	Preeti Tomar	58,504	52.38	−3.32
BJP	Tilak Ram Gupta	47,794	42.79	+6.81
INC	Kamal Kant Sharma	4,075	3.65	−3.37
BSP	Aruna	272	0.24	−0.04
NOTA	None of the above	516	0.46	+0.10
Majority		10,710	9.59	−10.13
Turnout		1,11,793	66.55	−4.64
AAP hold		Swing	-3.32	

State Legislative Assembly
Preceded by ?	Member of the Delhi Legislative Assembly from Tri Nagar Assembly constituency 2020– 2025	Succeeded by Tilak Ram Gupta
