= List of colonial governors and administrators of Saint Lucia =

This is a list of viceroys in Saint Lucia from the first French settlement in 1650, until the island gained independence from the United Kingdom in 1979. Saint Lucia was colonized by the British and French in the 17th century and was the subject of several possession changes until 1814, when it was ceded to the British by France for the final time. In 1958, St. Lucia joined the short-lived semi-autonomous West Indies Federation. Saint Lucia was an associated state of the United Kingdom from 1967 to 1979 and then gained full independence on February 22, 1979.

== Timeline of Saint Lucia ==
Documented Control of Saint Lucia
Date range	Country or people
200/400–800	Arawak people settle Saint Lucia
800–	Kalinago (Caribs) settle Saint Lucia
1550s	French Pirate François le Clerc sets up camp on Pigeon Island
1605	First English settlement
1626	First French claim to Saint Lucia, appointed first Saint Lucia governor in 1652
1638–1640	English Major Judge settlement until driven away by Caribs
1635	French settlements
1654	Dutch settlement at Vieux Fort Bay
1659	French drive off English invasion
1663	Caribs sell Saint Lucia to English governor and defeat French
1664–1666	English occupation
1667	Treaty of Breda (1667) gives control back to French
1674–1722	Annexed to the domain of the French Crown and made a dependency of Martinique
1686–1687	English raid and control
1687	English relinquish control to French
1697	Peace of Ryswick recognizes French control
1723–1743	Neutral territory (agreed by Britain and France)
1743–1747	French colony (Sainte Lucie)
1748–1755	Neutral territory (de jure agreed by Britain and France)
1756–1761	French colony (Sainte Lucie)
1762–1763	British occupation
1763–1777	France
1778	Britain
1781–1783	British occupation
1783–1793	France
1794–1795	British occupation
1796–1802	British occupation
1802	France
1803–1838	British colony
1814	British possession confirmed
1958–1962	Province of West Indies Federation
1962–1967	Crown colony of the United Kingdom
1967–1979	Associated state of the United Kingdom
1979–	Independent state, part of the Commonwealth of Nations

== History ==
Saint Lucia was originally occupied by the Caribs. The first Europeans to make a settlement there were the English, though the Caribs forced them off the island. In 1651, the French Jacques Dyel du Parquet landed and peacefully made contact with the Caribs, due to his Caribbean wife, and was established as the first French governor of Sainte Lucia. The English made claim to the island but repudiated all claims to it under the 1667 Treaty of Breda wherein Sainte Lucia was formally made a French Crown Colony in 1674. During the Seven Years' War, Saint Lucia changed hands several times before 1778 when the British captured Saint Lucia from the French during the American War of Independence. The island was returned to France until the French Revolution where the island was handed over to the United Kingdom in 1803 and then formalised in 1814 by the Treaty of Paris.

Originally Saint Lucia was administered by the Governor of Barbados and later the Governor of the Windward Islands. On the island, various British Administrators and Commissioners were appointed to deputise for the Governor on Saint Lucia. After a period as part of the West Indies Federation, Saint Lucia gained its first separate Governor in 1967 when it entered into free association with the United Kingdom, with Frederick Clarke appointed as the first local Governor. In 1979, Saint Lucia formally gained its independence. The sitting Governor of Saint Lucia, Allen Montgomery Lewis then became the Governor-General of Saint Lucia, continuing to represent Queen Elizabeth II whom would continue to reign as Queen of Saint Lucia.

== French and British Governors of the colony of Sainte Lucie, 1651–1802 ==
Colonial era governors of Saint Lucia
Name	Year	Title	Rule	Ref
Jacques Dyel du Parquet	1651	Lieutenant-General of Martinique, including Saint Lucia	French	
Louis de Kerengoan, sieur de Rousselan	1652–1654	Lieutenant Governor	French	
M. Lavriverie	1657	Governor	French	
M. Haquet	1657	Governor	French	
M. Le Breton	1657	Governor	French	
M. De Coutis	1658	Governor	French	
M. D'Aigremont	1658	Governor	French	
M. Lalanda	1659	Governor	French	
M. LeSeur Bonnard	1660–1664	Governor	French	
Mr. Robert Faulk	1664	Governor	French	
William, Lord Willoughby	1672	Governor of Saint Lucia, Barbados, St. Vincent and Dominica	English	
Charles de Courbon de Blénac	1677	Governor-General	French	
François d'Alesso d'Éragny	1691	Governor-General	French	
Thomas-Claude Renart de Fuchsamberg Amblimont	1697	Governor-General	French	
The Count d'Esnotz	1701	Governor-General	French	
Charles-François de Machault de Belmont	1703	Governor-General	French	
M. de Phelypeau	1711	Governor-General	French	
The Marquis Duquene	1715	Governor-General	French	
The Marquis de la Varenne	1717	Governor-General	French	
The Chevalier de Feuquieres	1717	Governor-General	French	
Captain Nathaniel Uring	1722	Deputy-Governor	British	
Charles de Tubières de Caylus	1744	Governor-General	French	
M. de Longueville	1745	Governor-General	French	
Pierre Lucien de La Chapelle de Jumilhac	1763–1764	Governor	French	
The Count d'Ennery	1768	Governor-General	French	
Baron de Micoud	1769	Lieutenant-Governor	French	
George Brydges Rodney	1762–1763	commander-in-chief of the Leeward Isles	British	
Claude Anne de Micoud	1764–1771		French	
The Chevalier Claude Anne Gui de Micoud	1771–1772	Lieutenant Governor	French	
Frédéric Laure de Kearney (M de Karny)	1772–1773	Lieutenant Governor	French	
Alexandre Potier de Courcy	1775–1775	Lieutenant Governor	French	
Marc Étienne de Joubert	1776–1776	Lieutenant Governor	French	
The Chevalier Claude Anne Gui de Micoud	1776–1781	Lieutenant Governor	French	
General Anthony St Leger	1781–1783	Lieutenant Governor	British	
Barron Jean Zénon André de Véron de Laborie	1784–1789	Governor	French	
Colonel Jean-Joseph Sourbader de Gimat	1789–1792	Governor	French	
Jean-Baptiste Raymond de Lacrosse	1792 - 1793	Military Commissioner in Guadeloupe	French	
General Nicolas Xavier de Ricard	1793–1794	Governor	French	
Colonel Sir Charles Gordon	1794–1795		British	
James Stewart	1795		British	
Gaspard Goyrand	1795–1796	Commissary	British	
General John Moore	1796–1797	Lieutenant Governor	British	
Colonel James Drummond	1797–1798	Lieutenant Governor	British	
General George Prevost	1798–1802	Lieutenant Governor	British	
General George Henry Vansittart	1802	Lieutenant Governor	British	
General Jean-François-Xavier Noguès	1802–1803	Lieutenant Governor	French	

Governors of Saint Lucia 1651-1802

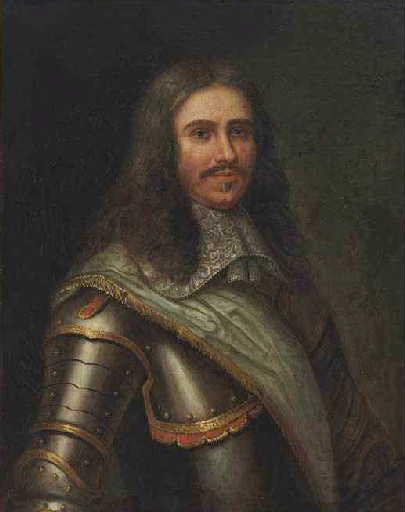
Jacques Dyel du Parquet, 1651

Jean-Baptiste Raymond de Lacrosse, 1792-1793

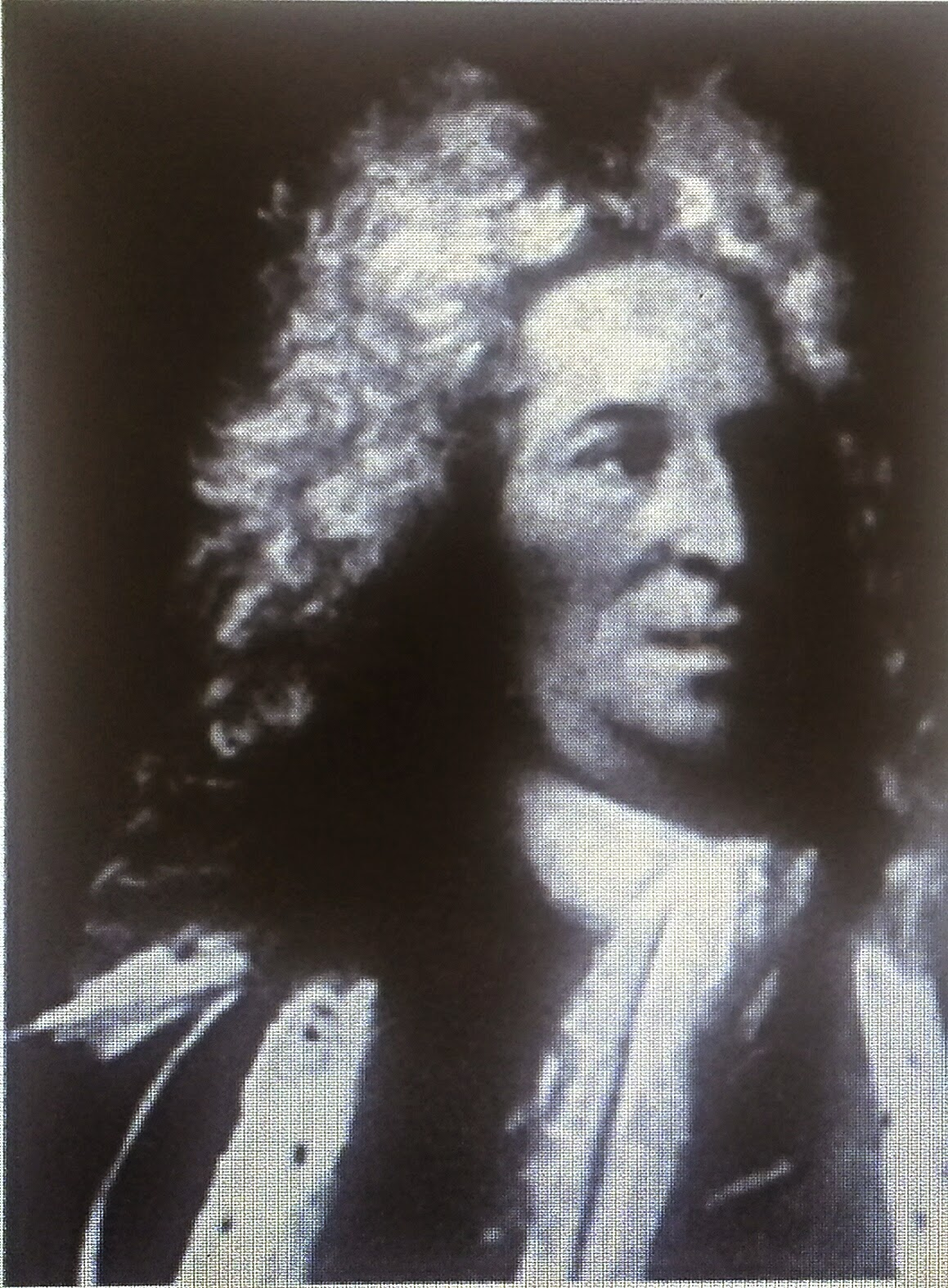
Thomas-Claude Renart de Fuchsamberg Amblimont, 1697

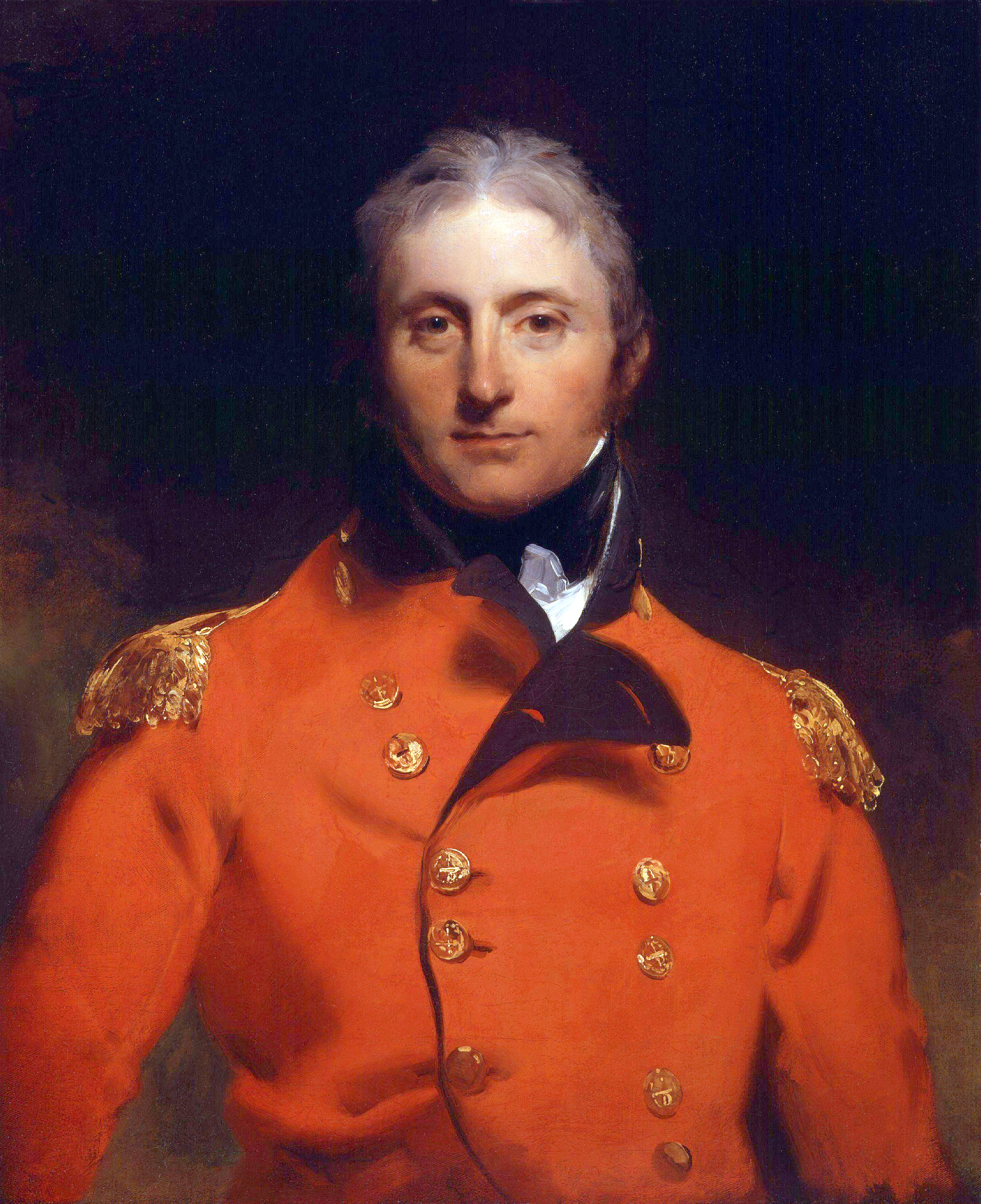
John Moore, 1796-1797

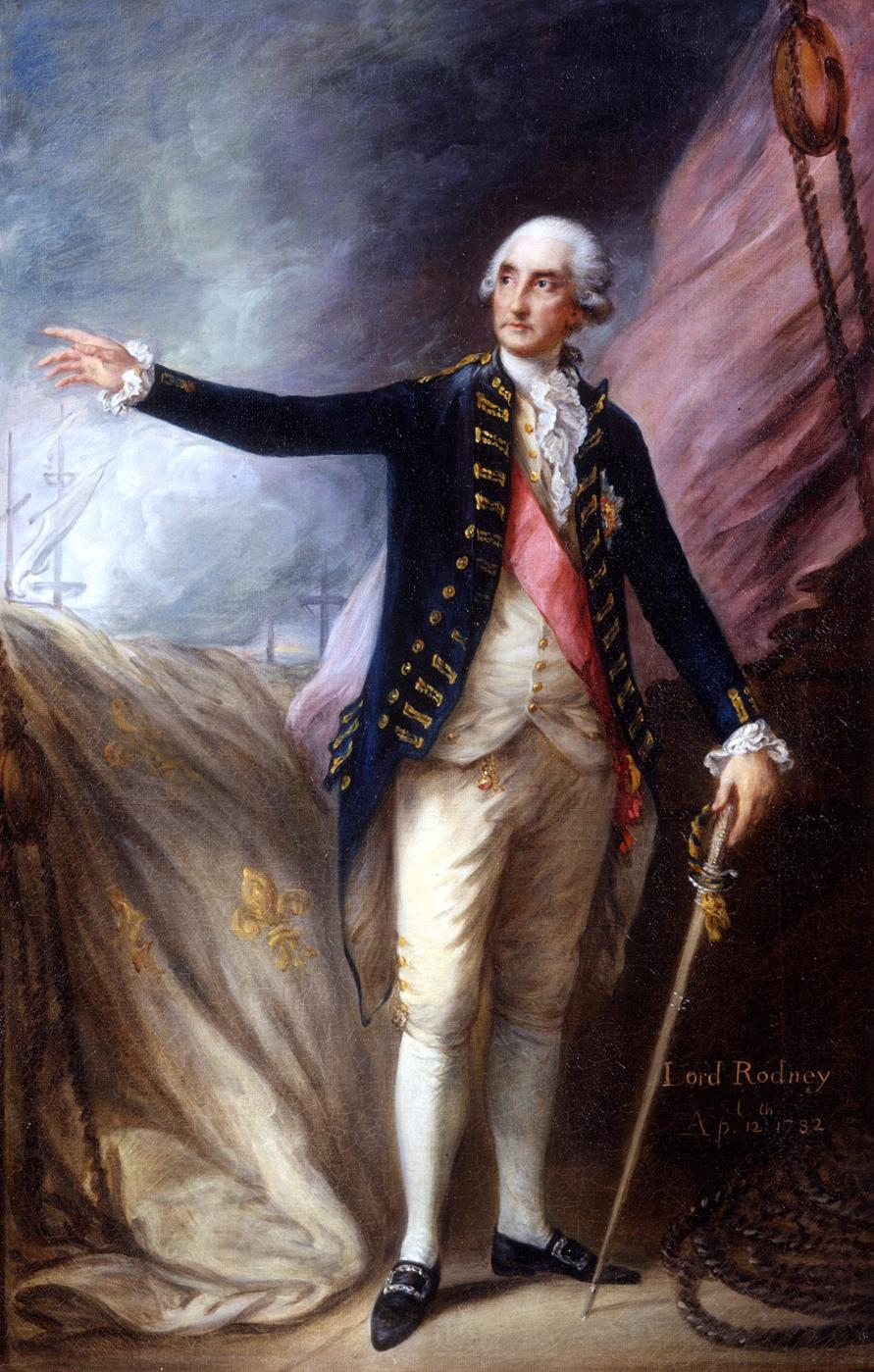
George Brydges Rodney, 1762-1763

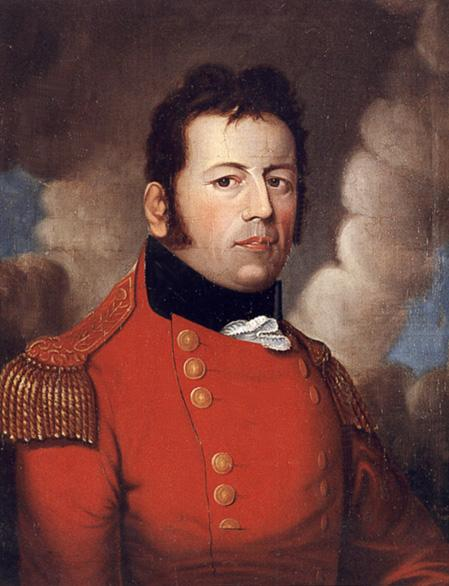
George Prévost, 1798–1802

== Governors of the British colony of Saint Lucia 1803–1834 ==
- General Robert Brereton 1803–1807, Commandant
- General Alexander Wood 1807–1814, Commandant
- Major Jacob Jordan 1814 (acting)
- General Francis Delaval 1814–1815, Commandant
- General Edward Stehelin 1815–1816, Commandant
- General Robert Douglas, Commandant 1816
- General Richard Augustus Seymour 1816–1817, Governor
- Colonel Edward O'Hara 1817–1818
- General Sir John Keane 1818–1819, Governor
- Major John Joseph Winkler 1819–1821 (acting Governor)
- General John Montagu Mainwaring 1821–1824, Governor
- Colonel Nathaniel Shepherd Blackwell 1824–1826
- General John Montagu Mainwaring 1826–1827, Governor
- Colonel Lorenzo Moore 1827–1829
- General David Stewart 1829, Governor
- Captain G.A.E. Delboate 1829 (acting Governor)
- Captain Robert Mullen 1829 (acting Governor)
- Major Francis Power 1829–1830 (acting Governor)
- James Alexander Farquharson 1830–1831, Governor
- George Mackie 1831, Governor
- Mark Anthony Bozon 1831–1832
- Colonel John Carter 1832 (acting Governor)
- James Alexander Farquharson 1832–1834 (second time)

== Lieutenant-Governors of Saint Lucia, 1834–1857 ==
The following Lieutenant-Governors of Saint Lucia were subordinate to the Governor of the British Windward Islands:

- Colonel Sir Dudley St. Leger Hill 1834–1837
- Colonel Thomas Bunbury 1837–1838
- Colonel John Alexander Mein 1838–1839
- Colonel Mathias Everard 1839–1841
- Captain George Murray 1841 (acting governor)
- Colonel George Graydon 1841–1843
- Captain William Caldwell 1841 (acting governor)
- Colonel Andrew Clarke 1843–1844
- Arthur Wellesley Torrens 1844–1848
- Sir Charles Henry Darling 1848–1852
- Henry Clermont Cobbe 1852
- Maurice Power 1852–1857

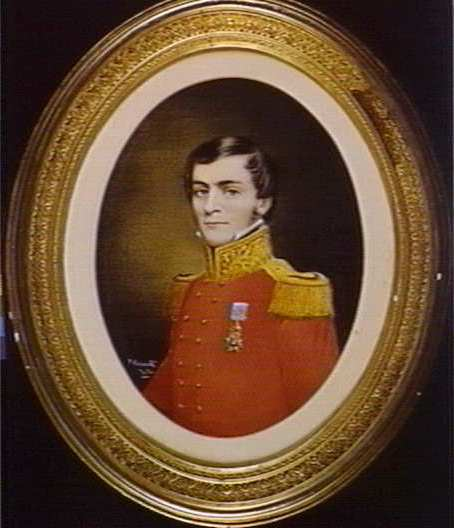
Colonel Andrew Clarke

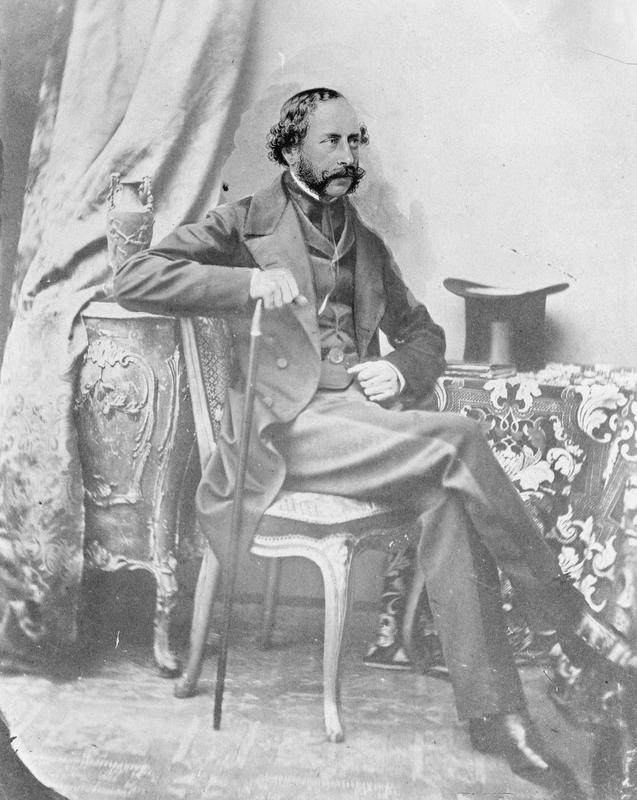
Arthur Wellesley Torrens

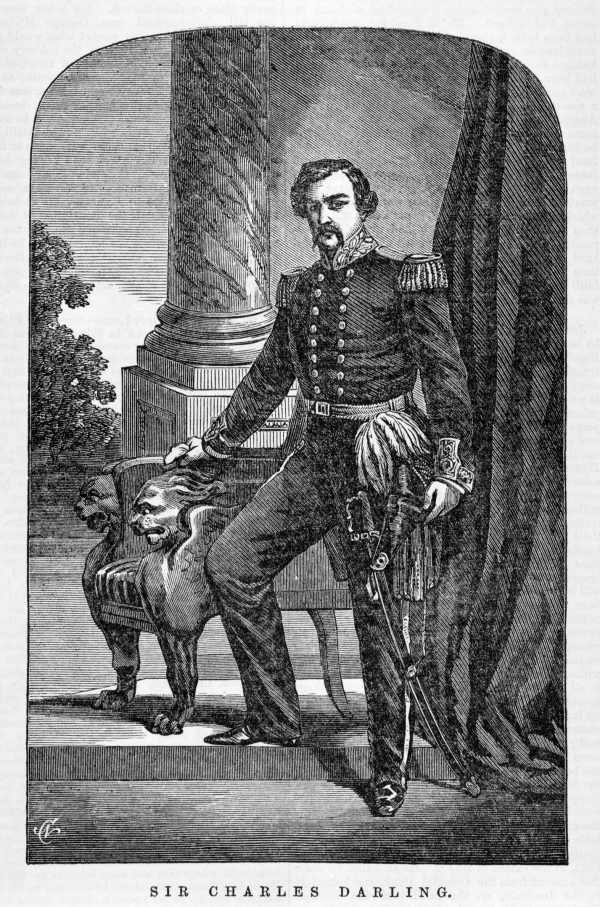
Sir Charles Darling

== Administrators of Saint Lucia 1857–1889 ==
- Henry Heggart Breen 1857–1862
- James Mayer Grant 1862–1869
- Sir William Des Vœux 1869–1878
- Arthur Elibank Havelock 1878–1879
- Sir Roger Goldsworthy 1881–1884
- Edward Laborde 1885–1889

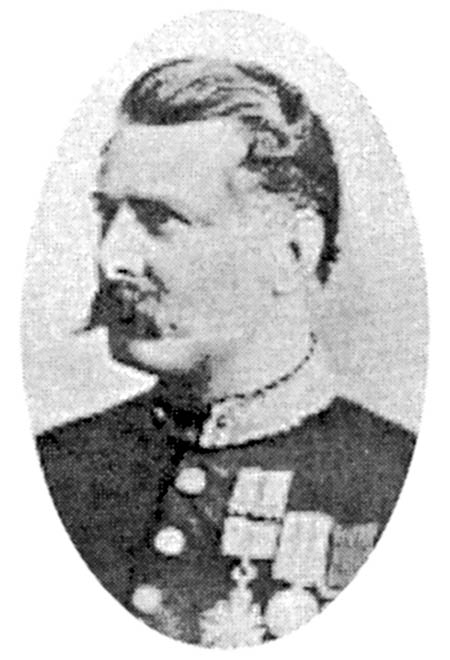
Sir Roger Goldsworthy

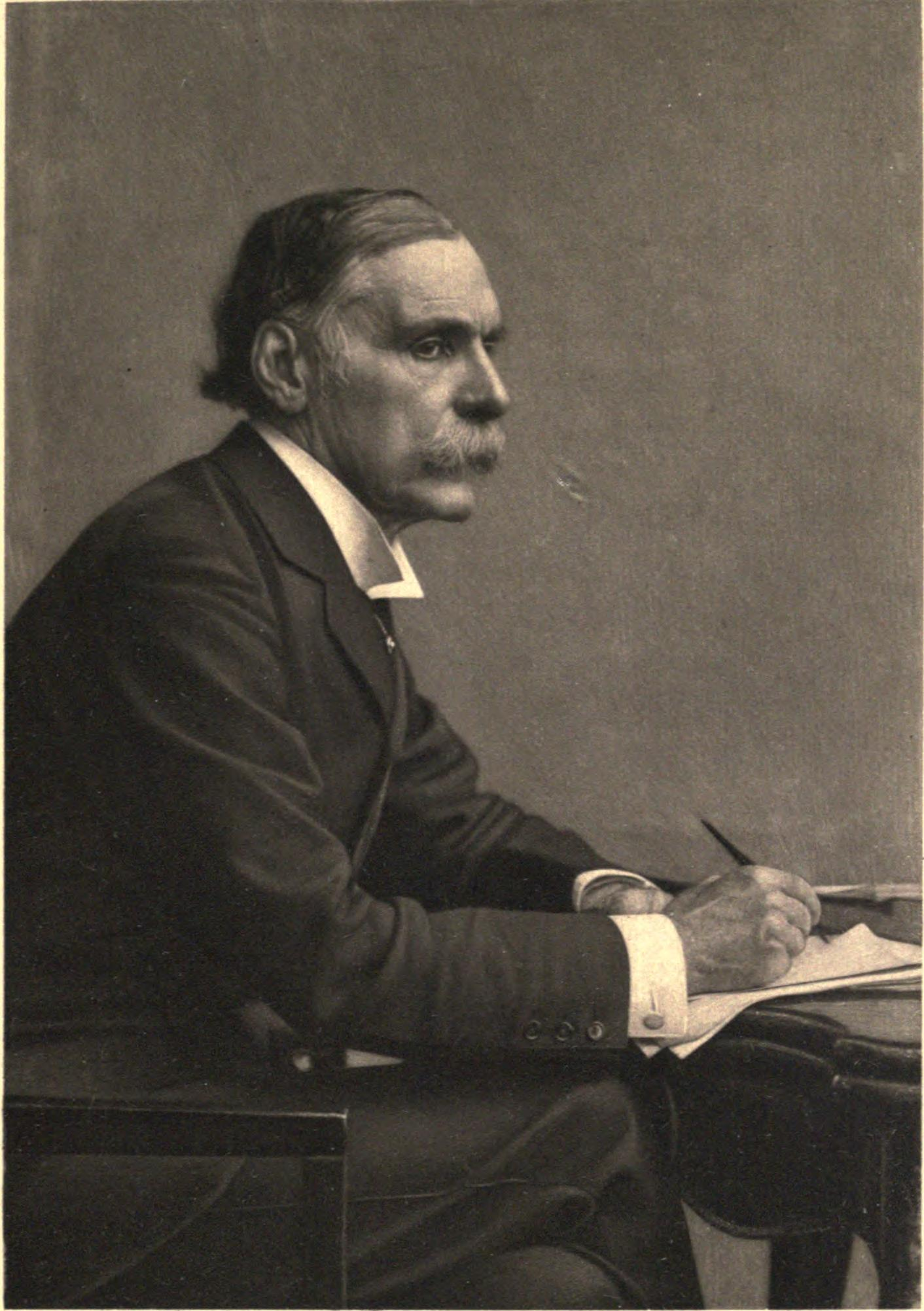
Sir William Des Vœux

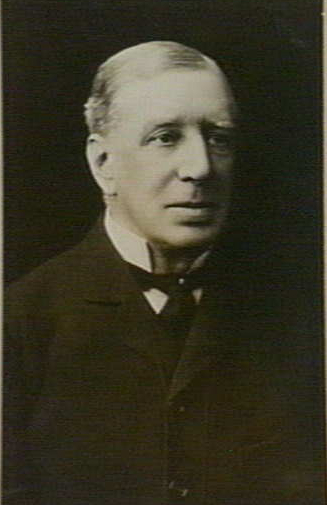
Sir Arthur Havelock

== Commissioners of Saint Lucia 1889–1958 ==
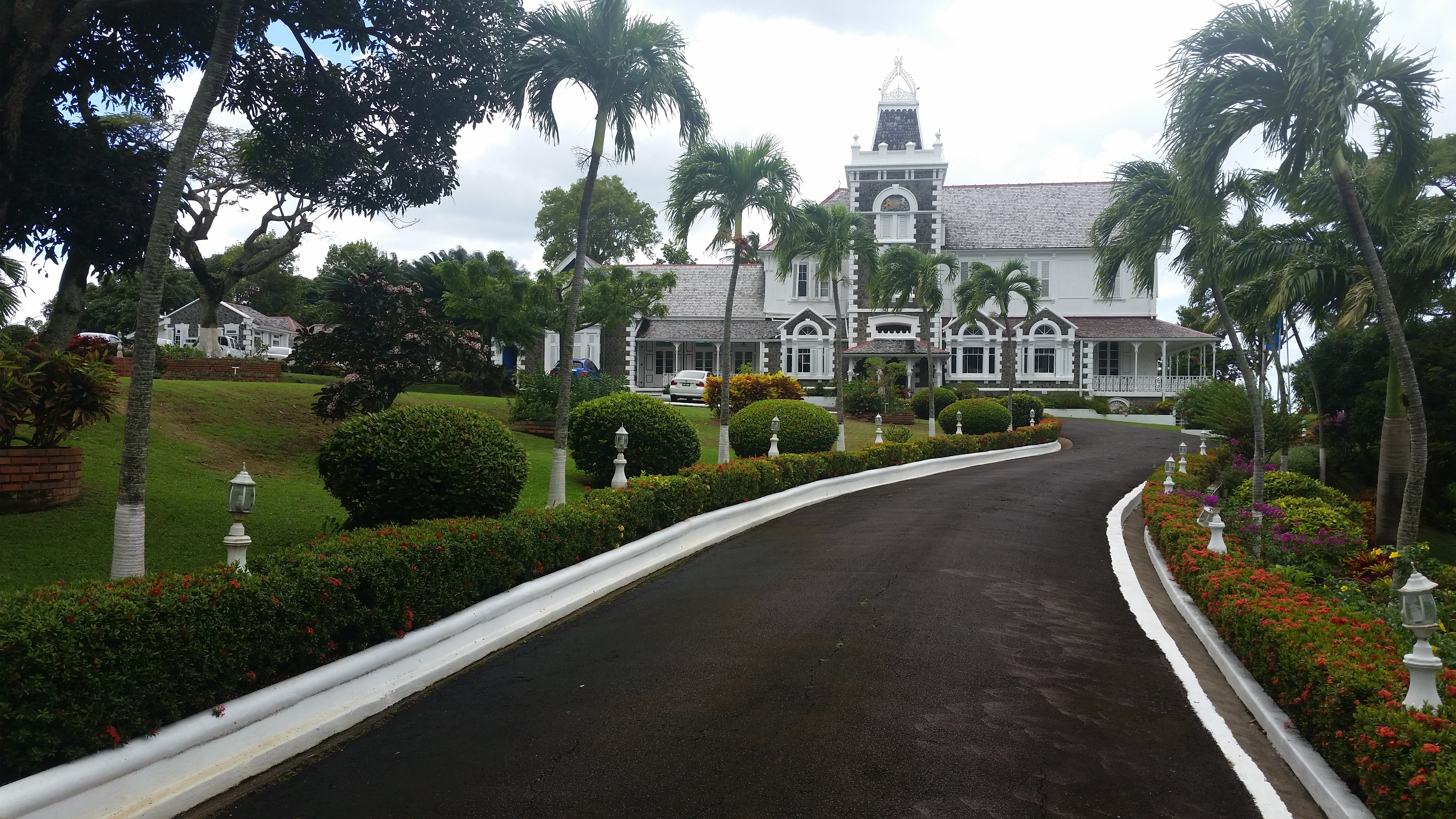
Government House, Saint Lucia

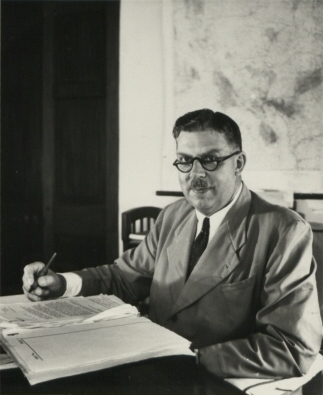
Edward Twining

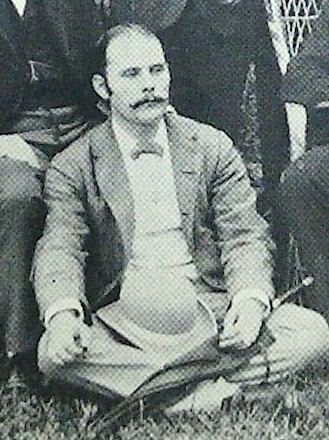
Edard John Cameron

- Robert Baxter Llewelyn 1889–1891
- Valesius Skipton Gouldsbury 1891–1896
- Charles Anthony King-Harman 1896–1899
- Sir Harry Langhorne Thompson 1900–1902
- Sir George Melville 1902–1905
- Philip Clark Cork 1905–1909
- Sir Edward John Cameron 1909–1914
- William Douglas Young 1914–1915
- Gideon Oliphant-Murray 1915–1918
- Wilfred Bennett Davidson-Houston 1918–1927
- Charles William Doorly 1927–1935
- Edward William Baynes 1935–1938
- Arthur Alban Wright 1938–1944
- Edward Francis Twining 1944–1946
- John Montague Stow 1947–1953
- John Kingsmill Thorp 1953–1958

== Administrators of Saint Lucia 1958–1967 ==
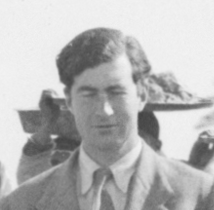
Julian Asquith

After incorporation into the Federation of the West Indies:

- Julian Asquith, 2nd Earl of Oxford and Asquith 1958–1962
- Gerald Jackson Bryan 1962–1967

== Governors of Saint Lucia 1967–1979 ==
On 27 February 1967, Saint Lucia became an associated state of the United Kingdom, responsible for its own internal affairs. Sir Frederick Joseph Clarke was the first native Saint Lucian governor.

- Sir Frederick Joseph Clarke 1967–1973, Governor
- Sir Ira Marcus Simmons 1973–1974, Governor
- Sir Allen Lewis 1974–1979, Governor

On 22 February 1979, Saint Lucia achieved independence from the United Kingdom. For a list of viceroys in Saint Lucia after independence, see Governor-General of Saint Lucia.
