= John Montague Stow =

British colonial official

Sir John Montague Stow GCMG KCVO

1st Governor-General of Barbados
- In office 30 November 1966 – 18 May 1967
- Monarch: Elizabeth II
- Prime Minister: Errol Walton Barrow
- Preceded by: Office Established; Himself as Governor
- Succeeded by: Arleigh Winston Scott

Governor of Barbados
- In office 8 October 1959 – 29 November 1966
- Monarch: Elizabeth II
- Preceded by: Robert Arundell
- Succeeded by: Office Abolished; Himself as Governor-General

Commissioner of Saint Lucia
- In office 1947–1953
- Monarchs: George VI; Elizabeth II
- Preceded by: Edward Twining
- Succeeded by: John Kingsmill Thorp

Personal details
- Born: 3 October 1911 Simla, Punjab Province, British Raj
- Died: 16 March 1997 (aged 85) London, England, United Kingdom
- Parent: Sir Alexander Montague Stow (father)
- Education: Harrow School
- Alma mater: Pembroke College, Cambridge

Sir John Montague Stow GCMG KCVO (3 October 1911 – 16 March 1997) was a British colonial official who served in various roles.

The son of Indian civilian Sir Alexander Montague Stow, John Stow was born in Simla, India, and was educated at Harrow and Pembroke College, Cambridge. He joined the Colonial Administrative Service in 1934 and was posted as a cadet to Nigeria. In 1938 he was appointed administrative officer in Kenya, and was seconded to The Gambia later that year as assistant district officer.

From 1947 until 1953 he served as the British government's Commissioner of Saint Lucia. In a later role, he was the last governor of the former colony of Barbados, serving from 8 October 1959 until 29 November 1966, and following Barbados obtaining independence from the United Kingdom on 30 November 1966, Stow was appointed as the first governor-general of Barbados, a position he served until 18 May 1967. He died on 16 March 1997, aged 85.

== See also ==
- List of governors of Barbados
- Governor-General of Barbados

Government offices
Preceded by Edward Francis Twining	Commissioner of Saint Lucia; 1947–1953	Succeeded by John Kingsmill Thorp
Preceded by Robert Arundell	Governor of Barbados; 1959–1966	Succeeded by —
Preceded by —	Governor-General of Barbados; 1966–1967	Succeeded by Arleigh Winston Scott
