= List of chief commissioners of Delhi =

Below is a list of chief commissioners of Delhi:

- 1 October 1912 – 7 November 1918: William Malcolm Hailey
- 7 November 1918 – 31 March 1924: Claud Alexander Barron
- 31 March 1924 – 15 April 1926: Evelyn Robins Abbott
- 15 April 1926 – 29 March 1928: Alexander Montague Stow
- 29 March 1928 – 7 August 1928: John Nesbitt Gordon Johnson (acting)
- 8 August 1928 – 21 March 1932: John Perronet Thompson
- 21 March 1932 – 21 March 1937: John Nesbitt Gordon Johnson
- 21 March 1937 – 1 July 1940: Evan Meredith Jenkins
- 1 July 1940 – 6 September 1945: Arthur Vivian Askwith
- 6 September 1945 – 14 August 1947: William Christie
