= Evelyn Robins Abbott =

British administrator in India (1873–1950)

Evelyn Robins Abbott CIE

Chief Commissioner of Delhi
- In office 1924–1926
- Preceded by: Claud Alexander Barron
- Succeeded by: Alexander Stow

Evelyn Robins Abbott, CIE (9 May 1873 – 7 May 1950) was an administrator in British India. A member of the Indian Civil Service, he was Chief Commissioner of Delhi from 1924 until 1926.

== Life ==
He was born at Derby, the son of the civil engineer Sam Abbott, and was educated at Bath College. He matriculated at Balliol College, Oxford in 1891.

In 1909, Abbott married Lillian, daughter of William Ovens Clark; they had two sons and three daughters. After returning to England, he served as chairman of the Wallingford Rural District Council from 1939 until his death and was a member of the Berkshire County Council from 1939 to 1946.
