= John Thorp (colonial administrator) =

Irish-born British diplomat (1912-1961)

Sir John Thorp CMG MBE

Commissioner of Saint Lucia
- In office 1953–1958
- Preceded by: John Montague Stow
- Succeeded by: Julian Asquith

Governor of Seychelles
- In office January 1958 – 13 August 1961
- Preceded by: William Addis
- Succeeded by: Julian Asquith

Personal details
- Born: 13 June 1912; County Cork, Ireland
- Died: 13 August 1961 (aged 49); Grand'Anse Mahé, Seychelles
- Cause of death: drowning
- Education: Campbell College, Belfast
- Alma mater: Trinity College, Dublin

Sir John Kingsmill Robert Thorp, CMG MBE (13 June 1912 – 13 August 1961) was a British colonial administrator. He was Governor of Seychelles from 1958 until his death in 1961.

The elder son of Samuel R. Thorp, of Tullow, County Carlow, and Mary (née Williams), of Mallow, County Cork, John Thorp was educated at Campbell College, Belfast and Trinity College, Dublin, where he was elected a foundation scholar in 1932 and took first-class moderatorship and the gold medal in Mental and Moral Science in 1933. He was lecturer in logic at Trinity College in 1934.

Thorp joined the Colonial Administrative Service and, after attending the Colonial Service Course at the University of Cambridge, was posted to Kenya in 1935 as a cadet, and served in the Kitui, Machakos, Turkana, Mombasa, Digo, Isiolo, Marsabit, Fort Hall and Nandi districts.

Thorp died by drowning at Grand'Anse Mahé on 13 August 1961, along with the Financial Secretary, Maurice Boullé.
