= Aaley Mohammad Iqbal =

Indian politician

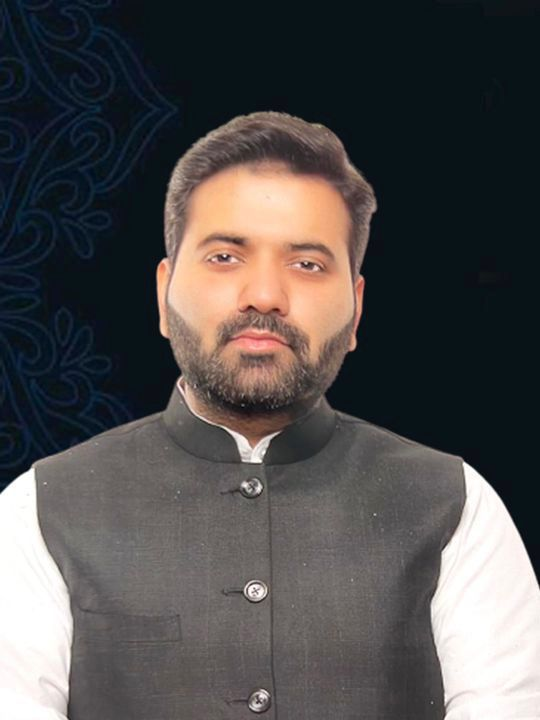

Member of the Delhi Legislative Assembly
- Incumbent
- Assumed office 8 February 2025
- Preceded by: Shoaib Iqbal
- Constituency: Matia Mahal

Deputy Mayor of Delhi
- In office 22 February 2023 – 14 November 2024
- Mayor: Shelly Oberoi
- Preceded by: Position established
- Succeeded by: Ravinder Bharadwaj
- Constituency: Ward no. 76

Personal details
- Born: 14 March 1990 (age 36) Delhi, India
- Party: Aam Aadmi Party (rebel)
- Parent: Shoaib Iqbal (father)

Aaley Mohammad Iqbal (born 14 March 1990) is a politician from Old Delhi. He is serving as a member of the Delhi Legislative Assembly from the Matia Mahal Assembly constituency since 8 February 2025. He had also served as the Deputy Mayor of Delhi Municipal Corporation. He is the elected councillor from Chandni Mahal Ward of Matia Mahal Assembly constituency. He has been elected for the Municipal Corporation of Delhi thrice, in 2012, 2017 and 2022.

He is also the President of the All India Crossminton Organization.

Aaley is the 1st term youngest councilor of MCD at the age of 22 on an independent ticket.

== Early life ==
He is the son of Shoaib Iqbal, former Member of the Delhi Legislative Assembly from Matia Mahal.

== Political career ==
At the age of 22, Iqbal made his debut in MCD by winning 2012 election as Rashtriya Lok Dal candidate from Turkman Gate. He was the chairman of the City Sadar Paharganj Zone.

In 2017, he was elected 2nd-term councilor of Municipal Corporation of Delhi.

In the 2022 Delhi MCD elections, Iqbal won for a third time with the highest margin and became the Deputy Mayor of Delhi. He defeated Mohammad Hamid of INC by a margin of 17134 votes.

He was also a member of All India Congress Committee.

Hs was nominated for the post of Deputy Mayor of MCD by the Aam Aadmi Party PAC. On 22 February 2023, Aaley won the election for the Deputy Mayor post. He received 31 more votes than his only rival of the Bhartiya Janta Party- Kamal Bagri. In total he had received 147 votes against his rival Kamal Bagri's 116. Elections are held for Delhi's mayoral posts at the end of every financial year. Deputy mayor Aaley Mohammad Iqbal of the Aam Aadmi Party won unopposed for the second term on 26 April 2023, and he served till November 2024.

He was elected as a member of the Delhi Legislative Assembly from the Matia Mahal Assembly constituency in 2025 Assembly Elections.
