= Matia Mahal Assembly constituency =

Constituency of the Delhi legislative assembly in India

Coordinates: 28.648°N 77.234°E

Matia Mahal
- Constituency No. 21 for the Delhi Legislative Assembly

Constituency details
- Country: India
- Region: North India
- Union Territory: Delhi
- District: Chandni Chowk
- Lok Sabha constituency: Chandni Chowk
- Total electors: 1,25,845
- Reservation: None

Member of Legislative Assembly
- 8th Delhi Legislative Assembly
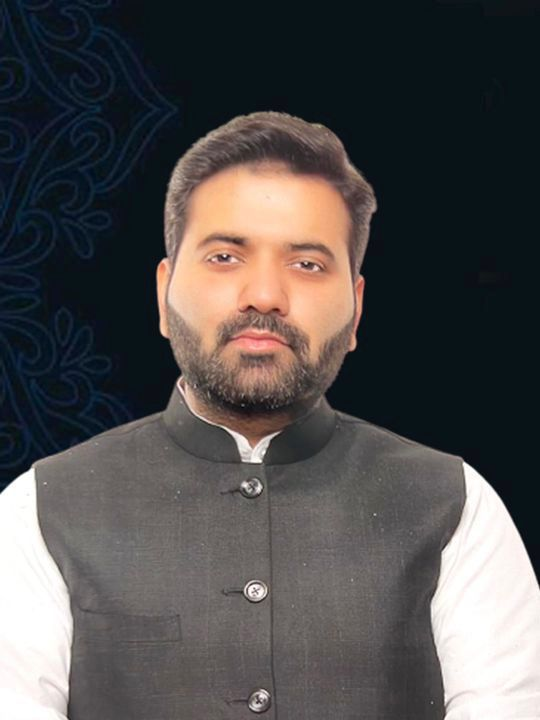
- Incumbent Aaley Mohammad Iqbal
- Party: All India Forward Bloc
- Elected year: 2025

Matia Mahal Assembly constituency is one of the seventy Delhi assembly constituencies of Delhi in northern India. Matia Mahal assembly constituency is a part of Chandni Chowk Lok Sabha constituency.

== Electoral history ==
The constituency was created in 1993 after abolition of Metropolitan Council. Since then, it has been represented by Shoaib Iqbal who contested the seats 7 times from different parties. However, during 2015 Delhi Legislative Assembly election, he contested from Indian National Congress and lost to Asim Ahmed Khan by a huge margin.

After the reunification of three municipal corporations into Municipal Corporation of Delhi, the Constituency was divided into 3 wards - Chandni Mahal, Sita Ram Bazaar and Delhi Gate.The constituency has 3 wards under it each represented by a Councillor.

1. Chandni Mahal - Imran Chaudhary (AIFB)
2. Delhi Gate - Kiran Rakesh Kumar (AAP)
3. Bazar Sita Ram - Rafia Mahir (AAP)

== Members of the Legislative Assembly ==
Year	Member	Party
1993	Shoaib Iqbal	Janata Dal
1998	Shoaib Iqbal	Janata Dal
2003	Shoaib Iqbal	Janata Dal (Secular)
2008	Shoaib Iqbal	Lok Janshakti Party
2013	Shoaib Iqbal	Janata Dal (United)
2015	Shoaib Iqbal	Aam Aadmi Party
2020	Shoaib Iqbal	Aam Aadmi Party
2025	Aaley Mohammad Iqbal	Aam Aadmi Party

== Election results ==
=== 2025 ===
Delhi Assembly elections, 2025: Matia Mahal
Party	Candidate	Votes	%	±%
AAP	Aaley Mohammad Iqbal	58,120	68.80	▼7.16
BJP	Deepti Indora	15,396	18.23	▼1.01
INC	Asim Ahmed Khan	10,295	12.19	▲8.34
NOTA	None of the above	217	0.26	
Majority		42,724	50.39	
Turnout		84,475		
AAP hold		Swing		

=== 2020 ===
Delhi Assembly elections, 2020: Matia Mahal
Party	Candidate	Votes	%	±%
AAP	Shoaib Iqbal	67,282	75.96	+16.73
BJP	Ravinder Gupta	17,041	19.24	+7.91
INC	Mirza Javed Ali	3,409	3.85	−22.90
BSP	Tej Ram	223	0.25	−0.24
NOTA	None of the above	216	0.24	−0.01
Majority		50,241	56.72	+24.24
Turnout		88,590	70.43	+1.12
AAP hold		Swing	+16.73	

=== 2015 ===
Delhi Assembly elections, 2015: Matia Mahal
Party	Candidate	Votes	%	±%
AAP	Asim Ahmed Khan	47,584	59.23	+33.18
INC	Shoaib Iqbal	21,488	26.74	−0.94
BJP	Shakeel Anjum Dehalvi	9,105	11.33	+2.87
NOTA	None of the above	203	0.25	−0.16
Majority		26,096	32.49	+28.46
Turnout		80,348	69.30	
AAP gain from JD(U)		Swing	+33.18	

=== 2013 ===
Delhi Assembly elections, 2013: Matia Mahal
Party	Candidate	Votes	%	±%
JD(U)	Shoaib Iqbal	22,732	31.72	+31.30
INC	Mirza Javed Ali	19,841	27.68	−0.07
AAP	Shakeel Anjum	18,668	26.05	
BJP	Nizamuddin	6,061	8.46	−0.88
NOTA	None	296	0.41	
Majority		2,891	4.03	−7.78
Turnout		71,780	65.77	
JD(U) gain from LJP		Swing	+11.56	

=== 2008 ===
Delhi Assembly elections, 2008: Matia Mahal
Party	Candidate	Votes	%	±%
LJP	Shoaib Iqbal	25,474	39.56	
INC	Mehmood Zia	17,870	27.75	−8.53
BSP	Abhey Singh Yadav	11,714	18.19	
BJP	Talat Sultana	6,015	9.34	+2.89
Independent	Mohd Shafiq	814	1.26	
NCP	Puran Chand	436	0.68	
RPI(A)	Nasiruddin	334	0.52	
AIMF	Rukhsana	322	0.50	
JD(U)	Ikramuddin	273	0.42	+0.11
Independent	Smt Chander Kanta Bharti	267	0.41	
Independent	Satish Kumar Dhawan	137	0.21	
Independent	Jaini Prasad	132	0.21	
Independent	Hafizul Haque	121	0.19	
Independent	Sibghat Ullah	117	0.18	
JKNPP	Tariq Mirza	88	0.14	
IJP	Ganga Ram	76	0.12	
RHC	Mahendra	73	0.11	
SP	Gurdeep Singh Chawla	69	0.11	+0.02
Independent	Vikram Singh	57	0.09	
Majority		7,607	11.81	−4.12
Turnout		64,389	56.3	+0.84
LJP gain from JD(S)		Swing		

=== 2003 ===
Delhi Assembly elections, 2003: Matia Mahal
Party	Candidate	Votes	%	±%
JD(S)	Shoaib Iqbal	25,222	52.21	
INC	Azhar Shagufa	17,524	36.28	+16.06
BJP	Qasim Malik	3,114	6.45	−5.36
RJD	Abdul Jabbar	1,185	2.45	
JKNPP	Nazar Mohd	362	0.75	
Independent	Satish Kumar	345	0.71	
Independent	Alimuddin Kurashi	211	0.44	
JD(U)	Abdul Mueen	149	0.31	
Independent	Faiz Mohd Khan	107	0.22	
SP	Gulfam	45	0.09	
United Citizen Party	Alim	44	0.09	
Majority		7,698	15.93	−29.03
Turnout		48,308	55.46	−1.08
JD(S) gain from JD		Swing		

=== 1998 ===
Delhi Assembly elections, 1998: Matia Mahal
Party	Candidate	Votes	%	±%
JD	Shoaib Iqbal	28,872	65.18	+2.41
INC	Aziz Ahmad Siddiqui	8,956	20.22	+10.63
BJP	Aslam Sadar	5,230	11.81	−5.63
RJD	Mohd Asif	406	0.92	
AWP	Mohd Irfan Qureshi	335	0.76	
Independent	Bhagat Singh	169	0.38	
Lok Shakti	Zahida Khatun	142	0.32	
BSP	Riazuddin	79	0.18	−0.02
Independent	Satish Kumar Dhawan	43	0.10	
Independent	Devraj	41	0.09	
LKD	Man Mohan Lal	22	0.05	
Majority		19,916	44.96	−0.37
Turnout		44,295	56.54	−13.10
JD hold		Swing	+2.41	

=== 1993 ===
Delhi Assembly elections, 1993: Matia Mahal
Party	Candidate	Votes	%	±%
JD	Shoaib Iqbal	27,617	62.77	
BJP	Begum Khurshid	17,672	17.44	
INC	Memood Pracha	16,221	16.59	
SP	Saeed Khan	2,068	4.70	
Independent	Khalil	677	1.54	
IUML	Syed Hamid Hussin Khizer	539	1.23	
Independent	Madan Lal Bhalla	338	0.77	
Independent	Shijauddin	189	0.43	
JP	C B Lall Saxena	184	0.42	
RPI	Javed Malik	99	0.23	
BSP	Om Prakash	86	0.20	
NDPF	Shakil Ahmed	52	0.12	
Independent	Mohd Aziz	46	0.10	
Independent	Zamil Hussain	34	0.08	
Independent	Har Bhajan Singh	31	0.07	
Independent	Irfan	24	0.05	
Doordarshi Party	Vijay Singh	23	0.05	
Independent	Man Mohan Lal	19	0.04	
Independent	Mohd Furkan	19	0.04	
Independent	Satish Verma	19	0.04	
Independent	Sagir Ahmed	15	0.03	
Independent	Manzoor Hasan	14	0.03	
Independent	Javed Iqbal	12	0.03	
Majority		19,945	45.33	
Turnout		43,998	69.64	
JD win (new seat)				
