= Tri Nagar Assembly constituency =

Constituency of the Delhi legislative assembly in India

Coordinates: 28.682°N 77.157°E

Tri Nagar
- Constituency No. 16 for the Delhi Legislative Assembly

Constituency details
- Country: India
- Region: North India
- State: Delhi
- District: Chandni Chowk
- Established: 1993
- Reservation: None

Member of Legislative Assembly
- 8th Delhi Legislative Assembly
- Incumbent Tilak Ram Gupta
- Party: BJP
- Elected year: 2025

Tri Nagar Assembly constituency is one of the seventy Delhi assembly constituencies of Delhi in northern India. Tri Nagar assembly constituency is a part of Chandni Chowk (Lok Sabha constituency).

== Members of Legislative Assembly ==
Year	Name	Party
1993	Nand Kishore Garg	Bharatiya Janata Party
1998	Nand Kishore Garg	Bharatiya Janata Party
2003	Anil Bhardwaj	Indian National Congress
2008	Anil Bhardwaj	Indian National Congress
2013	Nand Kishore Garg	Bharatiya Janata Party
2015	Jitender Singh Tomar	Aam Aadmi Party
2020	Preeti Tomar	Aam Aadmi Party
2025	Tilak Ram Gupta	Bharatiya Janata Party

== Election results ==
=== 2025 ===
Delhi Assembly elections, 2025: Tri Nagar
Party	Candidate	Votes	%	±%
BJP	Tilak Ram Gupta	59,073	53.36	▲10.57
AAP	Preeti Tomar	43,177	39.0	▼13.38
INC	Satendra Sharma	6,897	6.2	▲2.55
NOTA	None of the above	688	0.4	
Majority		15,896	14.4	▲4.81
Turnout		1,10,009	62.4	▼4.15
BJP gain from AAP		Swing		

=== 2020 ===
Delhi Assembly elections, 2020: Tri Nagar
Party	Candidate	Votes	%	±%
AAP	Preeti Tomar	58,504	52.38	−3.32
BJP	Tilak Ram Gupta	47,794	42.79	+6.81
INC	Kamal Kant Sharma	4,075	3.65	−3.37
BSP	Aruna	272	0.24	−0.04
NOTA	None of the above	516	0.46	+0.10
Majority		10,710	9.59	−10.13
Turnout		1,11,793	66.55	−4.64
AAP hold		Swing	-3.32	

=== 2015 ===
Delhi Assembly elections, 2015: Tri Nagar
Party	Candidate	Votes	%	±%
AAP	Jitender Singh Tomar	63,006	55.70	+22.64
BJP	Nand Kishore Garg	40,699	35.98	+0.20
INC	Anil Bharadwaj	5,939	2.02	−17.14
BSP	Nityanand Singh	317	0.28	−2.09
NOTA	None	407	0.36	
Majority		22,307	19.72	+16.98
Turnout		1,13,196	71.24	
AAP gain from BJP		Swing	+22.64	

=== 2013 ===
Delhi Assembly elections, 2013: Tri Nagar
Party	Candidate	Votes	%	±%
BJP	Nand Kishore Garg	36,970	35.78	−8.31
AAP	Jitender Singh Tomar	34,161	33.06	
INC	Anil Bharadwaj	24,962	24.16	−22.10
BSP	Ravi Raj Yadav	2,451	2.37	−0.96
Independent	Dharmender Kumar Ray	2,313	2.24	
SP	Mohmad Zuber	347	0.34	−1.37
DMDK	M S Subramanian	298	0.29	
Independent	Pawan	257	0.25	
Independent	Shiv Prakash Bansal	253	0.24	
RLD	K Kannan	157	0.15	
Independent	Narender Singhal	122	0.12	
RJP	Sukhdev Paswan	100	0.10	
Independent	Tek Chand	96	0.09	
JD(U)	Suleman Khan	91	0.09	
IBSP	Iliyash	74	0.07	
RKSP	Sunder Singh Khatri	74	0.07	
PECP	Sikandar Ali	61	0.06	
NOTA	None of the Above	548	0.53	
Majority		2,809	2.74	
Turnout		103,657	70.85	+7.48
BJP gain from INC		Swing		

=== 2008 ===
Delhi Assembly elections, 2008: Tri Nagar
Party	Candidate	Votes	%	±%
INC	Anil Bharadwaj	41,891	46.26	−10.21
BJP	Nand Kishore Garg	39,222	44.09	+2.39
BSP	Puran Mal Goel	5,073	5.60	
SP	Lalit Kumar Sharma	1,547	1.71	
BJSH	Sunder Singh Khatri	461	0.51	
Independent	Sanjay Kumar Gautam	299	0.33	
Independent	Jai Bhagwan	291	0.32	
NCP	Raj Kumar	254	0.28	−0.22
Independent	Sheela Devi	239	0.26	
LJP	Anuj Kumar Singh	235	0.26	
Independent	Babu Lal	138	0.15	
Independent	Anil Kumar	78	0.09	
Independent	Anil Kumar	71	0.08	
Independent	Om Prakash	46	0.05	
Majority		1,969	2.17	
Turnout		90,547	63.37	+3.27
INC hold		Swing		

=== 2003 ===
Delhi Assembly elections, 2003: Tri Nagar
Party	Candidate	Votes	%	±%
INC	Anil Bhardwaj	32,449	56.47	+9.91
BJP	Nand Kishore Garg	23,958	41.70	−9.39
Independent	Hamayun Khan	393	0.68	
NCP	Raj Kumar	289	0.50	
Independent	Satish Bhati	197	0.34	
JD(U)	Vijay Sharma	172	0.30	
Majority		8,491	14.77	
Turnout		57,458	60.11	+7.22
INC gain from BJP		Swing		

=== 1998 ===
Delhi Assembly elections, 1998: Tri Nagar
Party	Candidate	Votes	%	±%
BJP	Nand Kishore Garg	25,576	51.09	−4.46
INC	Chattar Singh	23,493	46.56	+7.70
SP	Shiv Kumar	543	1.08	+0.66
Independent	Vikram Singh Khari	244	0.48	
SAP	Nathu Singh Garg	200	0.40	
Independent	Ram Mala Verma	149	0.30	
Independent	Yad Ram Bokolia	32	0.06	
Independent	Rajender Kumar	16	0.03	
Majority		2,283	4.53	
Turnout		50,453	52.89	−16.52
BJP hold		Swing		

=== 1993 ===
Delhi Assembly elections, 1993: Tri Nagar
Party	Candidate	Votes	%	±%
BJP	Nand Kishore Garg	28,872	55.55	
INC	Deep Chand Sharma	20,199	38.86	
JD	Nathu Singh Garg	1,202	2.31	
SS	Raj Kumar Goel	497	0.96	
Independent	Suresh Kumar	339	0.65	
SP	Rakesh Kumar	217	0.42	
JP	Ram Lal Jain	138	0.27	
Independent	Raj Kumar Garg	121	0.23	
Independent	Dayan Singh Nirmal	62	0.12	
Independent	Paravati	62	0.12	
Independent	Sushil Kumar	55	0.11	
Independent	Lal Chand Adlakha	46	0.09	
Independent	Pram Prakash Mittal	33	0.06	
Independent	Satnam Singh	31	0.06	
Independent	Sanjay Kumar	28	0.05	
Independent	Harvinder Singh	25	0.05	
Doordarshi Party	Raghw Prsad	21	0.04	
AIFB	Ravinder Kumar Bhatnagar	13	0.03	
Independent	Karan Singh Jain	10	0.02	
Independent	Brijesh Dutt Pandey	8	0.02	
Majority		8,673	16.69	
Turnout		51,979	69.42	
BJP win (new seat)				
