= Sadar Bazar Assembly constituency =

Constituency of the Delhi legislative assembly in India

Coordinates: 28.657°N 77.210°E

Sadar Bazar
- Constituency No. 19 for the Delhi Legislative Assembly

Constituency details
- Country: India
- Region: North India
- State: Delhi
- District: Chandni Chowk
- Established: 1993
- Reservation: None

Member of Legislative Assembly
- 8th Delhi Legislative Assembly
- Incumbent Som Dutt
- Party: Aam Aadmi Party
- Elected year: 2025

Sadar Bazar Assembly constituency is one of the seventy Delhi assembly constituencies of Delhi in northern India. Sadar Bazar assembly constituency is a part of Chandni Chowk (Lok Sabha constituency).

== Members of the Legislative Assembly ==
Year	Name	Party
1993	Hari Krishan	Bharatiya Janata Party
1998	Rajesh Jain	Indian National Congress
2003	Rajesh Jain	Indian National Congress
2008	Rajesh Jain	Indian National Congress
2013	Som Dutt	Aam Aadmi Party
2015	Som Dutt	Aam Aadmi Party
2020	Som Dutt	Aam Aadmi Party
2025	Som Dutt	Aam Aadmi Party

== Election results ==
=== 2025 ===
Delhi Assembly elections, 2025: Sadar Bazar
Party	Candidate	Votes	%	±%
AAP	Som Dutt	56,177	47.44	
BJP	Manoj Kumar Jindal	49,870	42.11	
INC	Anil Bhardwaj	10,057	8.49	
NOTA	None of the above	586		
Majority		6307		
Turnout		1,18,400		
AAP hold		Swing		

=== 2020 ===
Delhi Assembly elections, 2020: Sadar Bazar
Party	Candidate	Votes	%	±%
AAP	Som Dutt	68,790	55.71	−0.89
BJP	Jai Prakash	43,146	34.94	+7.11
INC	Satbir Sharma	9,857	7.98	−5.71
BSP	Asad	574	0.46	−0.17
NOTA	None of the above	408	0.33	
Majority		25,644	20.77	−8.00
Turnout		1,23,524	66.80	−5.12
AAP hold		Swing	-0.89	

=== 2015 ===
Delhi Assembly elections, 2015: Sadar Bazar
Party	Candidate	Votes	%	±%
AAP	Som Dutt	67,507	56.60	+25.36
BJP	Parveen Kumar Jain	33,192	27.83	−2.68
INC	Ajay Maken	16,331	13.69	−14.82
BSP	Mirza Ali Raza	748	0.63	−1.78
SS	Man Mohan	257	0.22	
Majority		34,315	28.77	+28.04
Turnout		1,19,312	71.92	
AAP hold		Swing	+25.36	

=== 2013 ===
Delhi Assembly elections, 2013: Sadar Bazar
Party	Candidate	Votes	%	±%
AAP	Som Dutt	34,079	31.24	
BJP	Jai Prakash	33,283	30.51	−7.08
INC	Rajesh Jain	31,094	28.51	−24.93
Independent	Rajesh Dass	3,496	3.21	
Independent	Jai Prakash	2,785	2.55	
BSP	Mirza Ali Raza	2,632	2.41	−3.22
Independent	Vinod Rana	263	0.24	
ABP	Jagmohan Singh	198	0.18	
LJP	Mohd Gulab	160	0.15	
Independent	Maqsood Ahmed Khan	159	0.15	
NCP	Daya Ram Saini	130	0.12	
Independent	Abdul Khubab	88	0.08	
Independent	Khurshid Alam	57	0.05	
Independent	Asif Ali	45	0.04	
Majority		796	0.73	−15.12
Turnout		109,084	71.18	+11.08
AAP gain from INC		Swing		

=== 2008 ===
Delhi Assembly elections, 2008: Sadar Bazar
Party	Candidate	Votes	%	±%
INC	Rajesh Jain	47,508	53.44	−12.63
BJP	Jai Prakash	33,419	37.59	+7.56
BSP	Rajendra Kumar Prajapati	5,004	5.63	
SP	Ganga Singh	776	0.87	
NCP	Raj Kumar	454	0.51	
Independent	Shakil Ahmed	446	0.50	
Independent	Prahlad	295	0.33	
LJP	Mohd Gulab	278	0.31	
JKNPP	Ramesh Kumar	162	0.18	
Independent	Asif Ali	120	0.13	
Independent	Vipin Sharma	99	0.11	
Independent	Brij Mohan	95	0.11	
Independent	Avinash Puri	83	0.09	
Independent	Kamal Singh	80	0.09	
IJP	Naveen Kumar Jain	76	0.09	
Majority		14,089	15.85	
Turnout		88,895	60.1	+3.49
INC hold		Swing		

=== 2003 ===
Delhi Assembly elections, 2003: Sadar Bazar
Party	Candidate	Votes	%	±%
INC	Rajesh Jain	33,144	66.07	−3.07
BJP	Prof Raghuvansh Singhal	15,065	30.03	−1.30
SP	Mohd Imran Ansari	665	1.33	
ABHM	Balbir Singh	257	0.51	
Independent	Ravi Kumar	222	0.44	
Independent	Vikas	215	0.43	
Independent	Arun Kumar	206	0.41	
JCP	Mahipal Singh	87	0.17	
Independent	Ashok Bhasin	78	0.16	
Independent	Yogesh	71	0.14	
Independent	Babu Lal	68	0.14	
Independent	Mohd Asif	47	0.09	
Independent	Mohinder Kumar Jatav	23	0.05	
Independent	Mohd Irfan	20	0.04	
Majority		18,079	36.04	+4.37
Turnout		50,168	56.61	+3.46
INC hold		Swing		

=== 1998 ===
Delhi Assembly elections, 1998: Sadar Bazar
Party	Candidate	Votes	%	±%
INC	Rajesh Jain	32,555	63.00	+18.39
BJP	Hari Krishan	16,187	31.33	−15.60
BSP	Rajender Singh Mathoo	1,072	2.07	+1.18
JD	Sumit Pal Singh	919	1.78	−1.01
SS	Chander Shekhar Gupta	381	0.74	
Independent	Laiq Ahmed	283	0.55	
Independent	Raftar Hussain	73	0.14	−0.05
Independent	Jagan Nath	50	0.10	−1.30
Independent	Rajesh Kumar	49	0.09	
DBP	Avinash Puri	28	0.05	
Loktantrik Samajwadi	Ram Prakash	22	0.04	
Independent	Rajesh Kumar	20	0.04	
Independent	Sita Ram Mourya	18	0.03	
Independent	Sanjay Jain	13	0.03	
Independent	Kanwar Pal	4	0.01	−0.04
Majority		16,368	31.67	
Turnout		51,674	53.15	−12.55
INC gain from BJP		Swing		

=== 1993 ===
Delhi Assembly elections, 1993: Sadar Bazar
Party	Candidate	Votes	%	±%
BJP	Hari Krishan	27,125	46.93	
INC	Harcharan Singh Joshi	25,786	44.61	
JD	Mohammed Ilyas	1,615	2.79	
Independent	Jagan Nath	812	1.40	
BSP	Rajender Singh Mathoo	514	0.89	
Independent	Sudhir Jain	395	0.68	
Independent	Baljeet Singh	244	0.42	
Independent	Mohd Yasmin Ansari	223	0.39	
Independent	Avinash Puri	184	0.32	
Independent	Gauri Shanker	152	0.26	
Independent	Raftar Hussain	111	0.19	
Independent	Arun Mundra	100	0.17	
Independent	Raj Kumar	93	0.16	
Independent	Jahangir Khan	66	0.11	
Independent	Rajeev Sharma	66	0.11	
Independent	Munna	45	0.08	
Independent	Vijay Kumar	40	0.07	
Independent	Irfan Javed Qureshi	38	0.07	
Independent	Mahesh Chand Gupta	38	0.07	
Independent	Ashok Kumar	33	0.06	
Independent	Devender Kumar	32	0.06	
Independent	Kanwar Pal	29	0.05	
Independent	Parvesh Sultan	24	0.04	
Independent	Suresh Kumar	23	0.04	
Independent	Gurmeet Singh	10	0.02	
Majority		1,339	2.32	
Turnout		57,798	65.70	
BJP win (new seat)				
