= John Perronet Thompson =

British administrator in India (1873–1935)

Sir John Perronet Thompson, KCSI, KCIE (8 March 1873 – 8 August 1935) was a British administrator in India. A member of the Indian Civil Service, he was secretary to Sir Michael O'Dwyer in 1919. From 1922 to 1927, he was Political Secretary to the Government of India, and from 1928 to 1932, he was Chief Commissioner of Delhi.

== Early life and education ==
John Thompson was the second son of Vincent Thomas Thompson, Assistant Recorder of Leeds. He was educated at Leeds Grammar School and Trinity College, Cambridge. At Cambridge he was President of the Cambridge Union.

== Personal and family ==
In 1901 Thompson married Ada Lucia Tyrell, daughter of Dr R.Y. Tyrell, Senior Fellow of Trinity College, Dublin. They had three sons and two daughters.

== Honours ==
Thompson was appointed a Knight Commander of the Order of the Indian Empire (KCIE) in the 1926 Birthday Honours.

== Death ==
Thompson died on 8 August 1935 in a nursing home, following an operation for appendicitis. He left £11,322 gross.

== Selected publications ==
- India. The White Paper. London: Macmillan & Co. 1933.
