= Claud Alexander Barron =

British administrator in India (1871–1948)

Claud Alexander Barron CSI, CIE, CVO, FRGS

Chief Commissioner of Delhi
- In office 1918–1924
- Preceded by: Malcolm Hailey
- Succeeded by: Evelyn Robins Abbott

Claud Alexander Barron, CSI, CIE, CVO, FRGS (22 December 1871 – 29 December 1948) was an administrator in British India. A member of the Indian Civil Service, he was Chief Commissioner of Delhi from 1918 to 1924.
