= Rajesh Jain =

Indian politician

Member of Legislative Assembly for Sadar Bazar
- In office 1998–2013
- Succeeded by: Som Dutt

Personal details
- Born: 5 August 1956 (age 69)
- Party: Indian National Congress

Rajesh Jain (born 5 August 1956) is an Indian politician and is member of the Second, Third and Fourth Legislative Assembly of Delhi. He is a member of the Indian National Congress and represents Sadar Bazar (Assembly constituency) of Delhi.
