= Thomas Bunbury (British Army general) =

British Army general (1783–1857)

Sir Thomas Bunbury, KH (1783–1857) was a British soldier and colonialist.

== Career ==
Thomas was born in Cranavonane, Ireland, and joined the British Army at the age of 17 starting as an ensign in the 8th West India Regiment. He served in the West Indies from 1804 to 1808 by which time he had become a captain. He transferred to the 54th and then returned to Europe to participate in the Peninsular War. In April 1814 he attained the rank of major and was sent to America to serve with thein the Glengarry Light Infantry. In January 1827 he was dispatched to Portugal for 16 months.

He went on to serve first as Governor of British Guyana (where Hugh Mills Bunbury, his brother had large sugar plantations), and then as Governor of St Lucia (1837–1838). Responsible for running the colony following the emancipation of the enslaved Africans, he remarked "in no island I have visited, is there a more decided warfare carried on in local politics than here." He retired as a major-general and settled down in Kingston, Jamaica.

== Family life ==
He married Jane Pearse on 3 February 1811, with whom he had four children:

- Thomas Charles Bunbury (1812–1894) born in Cork, served in the 60th Rifles
- Stonehouse George Bunbury (1818–1880), born in Cork, also joined the 60th Rifles and subsequently served with the 67th in Jamaica where he married Georgina Vidal daughter of John Gale Vidal, a prominent Jamaican solicitor.
- Harry Bunbury (born 1819) also served with the 60th Rifles
- Catherine Bunbury, (1815–1838)
