= Gordon Johnson (colonial administrator) =

British administrator in India *1885–1955)

Sir John Nesbitt Gordon Johnson, CSI, CIE (25 February 1885 – 9 June 1955), known as Sir Gordon Johnson, was a British administrator in India. A member of the Indian Civil Service, he was Chief Commissioner of Delhi from 1932 to 1937.
