= Sahibabad Daulat Pur =

Shahbad Daulat Pur
- Village
- Location in India
- Coordinates: 28.75017°N 77.10604°E
- Country: India
- Union Territory: Delhi
- District: North West

Government
  - Type: Federal, Parliamentary, Constitutional, Republic

Population (2011)
  - Total: 54,729

Languages
  - Official: Hindi, English
- Time zone: UTC+5:30 (IST)
- Postal code: 110042

Shahbad Daulatpur is a Village located in Rohini, North West District in Union Territory of Delhi, India.

== Demographics ==
Historical population
Year	Pop.	±%
2001	35,980	—
2011	54,773	+52.2%
Source: Government of India

Sahibabad Daulat Pur has a population of 54,729 according to the 2011 census. Males constitute 51% of the population and females 49%. In the 2000s, the average literacy rate was 74%; 86% of males and 62% of females. Sixteen percent of the population is under six years of age. The town hosts the world-renowned Delhi Technological University and a few schools. The town is locally known as Shahbad Daulatpur. It comes under the constituency of Bawana Delhi. The nearest railway station is at Badli.
