= Asim Ahmed Khan =

Indian politician

Cabinet Minister, Government of Delhi
- In office 14 February 2015 – 9 October 2015
- Cabinet: Kejriwal ministry - II
- Ministry and Departments: Food; Civil Supply; Environment; Forest; Minority Affairs; Elections
- Preceded by: President's Rule

Member of the Legislative Assembly
- In office Feb 2015 – Feb 2020
- Preceded by: Shoaib Iqbal
- Succeeded by: Shoaib Iqbal
- Constituency: Matia Mahal

Personal details
- Born: 20 March 1976 (age 50) Delhi, India
- Party: Aam Aadmi Party
- Other political affiliations: Indian National Congress
- Parent: Shamim Ahmed Khan (father)
- Education: Chaudhary Charan Singh University
- Profession: Businessperson and politician

Asim Ahmed Khan is an Indian politician (Delhi State), and former minister of Food and Civil Supply, Environment and Forest, Minority Affairs and Election in the Delhi government. He was a member of the Aam Aadmi Party (AAP) and represented Matia Mahal (Assembly constituency) in the 6th Delhi Assembly.

He left the AAP on 23 December 2024 and joined the Indian National Congress.

== Early life and education ==
Asim Ahmed Khan was born in Delhi. He attended the Chaudhary Charan Singh University and earned a Bachelor of Arts degree.

== Politics ==
Asim Ahmed Khan is a member of the AAP minority wing. He contested the Municipal Corporation of Delhi (MCD) elections in 2012 and received 6,300 votes. The AAP party website states that he has worked for 12 years in Old Delhi area and participated in numerous social activities.

Khan contested Matia Mahal (Assembly constituency) in the 2015 Delhi Legislative Assembly elections as an AAP candidate. He raised issues of education and health in his campaign. Khan won the seat with 47,584 votes. He defeated five-time MLA Shoaib Iqbal (who contested on an Indian National Congress – INC – ticket) by a margin of 26,096 votes. Khan was "the less acknowledged 'giant killers'". Khan – who had a "poor experience in politics" – was expected to lose Iqbal, who won five times despite switching political parties four times. Iqbal had won the 2013 elections on a Janata Dal (United) (JD(U)) ticket. The AAP won 67 of the total 70 seats in the Delhi assembly.

Khan was one of four Muslim MLAs of the AAP in the Sixth Legislative Assembly of Delhi. The Economic Times described Khan as "key" to AAP, which won 80% of the Muslim vote. Khan and the AAP's minority wing were responsible for deflecting the Muslim votes – who traditionally voted for the Congress – to the AAP, which led to the AAP's decisive victory.

Khan was sworn in as a cabinet minister under the chief minister Arvind Kejriwal on 14 February 2015. He was put in charge of the Food and Civil Supply, Environment and Forest, Minority Affairs and Election ministries. On 9 October 2015, Delhi's Chief Minister Arvind Kejriwal sacked the cabinet minister Asim Ahmed Khan on charges of corruption. He was accused of 'cutting a deal worth Rs. 6 lakh' with a local builder'. He was later given a clean chit by CBI due to lack of evidence.

== See also ==
- Matia Mahal
- Sixteenth Legislative Assembly of Uttar Pradesh
- Uttar Pradesh Legislative Assembly
