= Tilak Ram Gupta =

Indian politician

Member of the Delhi Legislative Assembly
- Incumbent
- Assumed office 8 February 2025
- Preceded by: Preeti Tomar
- Constituency: Tri Nagar

Personal details
- Political party: Bhartiya Janata Party

Tilak Ram Gupta is an Indian politician from Bharatiya Janata Party from Delhi. He was elected as a Member of the Legislative Assembly in the 8th Delhi Assembly from Tri Nagar Assembly constituency.
