= Som Dutt =

Indian politician

Member of the Delhi Legislative Assembly
- Incumbent
- Assumed office 28 December 2013
- Preceded by: Rajesh Jain
- Constituency: Sadar Bazar

Personal details
- Born: 17 February 1977 (age 49)
- Party: Aam Aadmi Party

Som Dutt is an Indian politician and is member of the Fifth and Sixth Legislative Assembly of Delhi. He is a member of the Aam Aadmi Party and represents Sadar Bazar (Assembly constituency) of Delhi.

== Conviction ==
Som Dutt was convicted of beating and assaulting a man during the 2015 Delhi Legislative Assembly election campaign. The Gulabi Bagh resident was beaten brutally with a baseball bat. According to the victim, about 50 AAP members had entered his residence, with Dutt beating him with the bat after an altercation while Dutt was conducting an election campaign. He was given a 6-month jail term and Rs 2 lakh fine.

== Election Results ==
Delhi Assembly elections, 2020: Sadar Bazar
Party	Candidate	Votes	%	±%
AAP	Som Dutt	68,790	55.71	−0.89
BJP	Jai Prakash	43,146	34.94	+7.11
INC	Satbir Sharma	9,857	7.98	−5.71
BSP	Asad	574	0.46	−0.17
NOTA	None of the above	408	0.33	
Majority		25,644	20.77	−8.00
Turnout		1,23,524	66.80	−5.12
AAP hold		Swing	-0.89	

State Legislative Assembly
Preceded by ?	Member of the Delhi Legislative Assembly from Sadar Bazar Assembly constituency 2020–	Incumbent
