= Nand Kishore Garg =

Indian politician

Member of Delhi Legislative Assembly
- In office 2013–2015
- Constituency: Tri Nagar
- In office 1993–2003
- Constituency: Trinagar

Municipal Councillor
- In office 1983–1990
- Constituency: Karampura

Personal details
- Born: 26 January 1949 (age 77) Haryana, India
- Party: Bhartiya Janta Party
- Spouse: Usha Garg
- Children: 3
- Education: M.Sc, LLB, PHD
- Website: www.nandkgarg.com

Nand Kishore Garg (born 26 January 1949) is an Indian social worker and a former MLA of Delhi from Trinagar constituency. He is a National Executive of Bhartiya Janta Party.

== Political career ==
He was elected the Municipal Councillor for Karam Pura Constituency, New Delhi (1983-1989). In 1997, he was appointed Parliamentary Secretary by Delhi's Chief Minister Shri. Saheb Singh Verma. In 1993, he was elected as the MLA from Trinagar constituency, New Delhi. He is recognised and known among the masses for his selfless efforts done for the betterment of the society.

=== Positions held ===
- Member: -National Executive
- Ex. Parliamentary Secretary:- Chief Minister, Govt. of NCT Delhi (1997-1998)
- Member Delhi Vidhan Sabha:- Represented Tri Nagar Constituency (Chandni Chowk) in Legislative Assembly, Delhi for 10 years (1993-2003).
- Chief Whip BJP:- BJP Legislative Party, Delhi Vidhan Sabha (1998-2003)
- Municipal Councillor:- Represented Karam Pura Constituency in Municipal Corporation of Delhi (1983-1990)
- President:- Bhartiya Janta Party Delhi, Sadar District (1991).
- Ex. General Secretary:- Bhartiya Janta Party, Delhi Pradesh for two years.
- Former Vice-President:- BJP Delhi Pradesh
- Convenor:- Delhi BJP Campaigning Committee in 1999 and helped in winning all seven seats for the 1st time.
- Ex. Member:- Delhi Vidyut Board (formerly DESU)

== Social work ==
As a social worker, Garg held prominent positions in various organisations.

- Director:- Bharat Prakashan Ltd. (Publisher of Panchjanya and Organiser Weekly)
- Founder:- Bharat Lok Shiksha Parishad, (WHICH IS RUNNING OVER 1000 EKAL VIDYALAYS ESPECIALLY IN TRIBAL AREAS OF J&k, H.P. AND U.P.)
- Chancellor- Maharaj Agrasen University.
- Active Member:- Samkalp (Training for IAS, IPS, IRS etc.).
- Founder Chairman:- Maharaja Agrasen Institute of Technology (Affiliated to GGSIP University)
- Founder Chairman:- Maharaja Agrasen Institute of Management Studies
- Founder Chairman:- Maharaja Agrasen University, Baddi, H.P.
- Founder Chairman:- Shree Agrasen Urban Cooperative T & C Society Ltd. (Having more than 15000 members).
- Founder & Chief Patron:- Maharaja Agrasen Hospital, Punjabi Bagh, New Delhi.(360 Beds Ultra Modern Hospital having more than 1100 Trustees).
- Vice-Chairman:- Maharaja Agrasen Medical College, Agroha, Haryana.
- Secretary:- Mukherjee Nyas (Regd.).
- Vice- President:- Hindu Shiksha Samittee, Delhi Pradesh.
- Trustee:- Shri Bhao Rao Devras Sewa Trust, Lucknow U.P. (Shri A.B. Vajpayee Ji is Founder President of this Trust).
- Member Executive:- P.P.J. Saraswati Vihar Residential School, Nainital (Vidyabharti)
- Founder & Chairman:- Teerth Vikas Trust, Delhi (Engaged in upkeeping of Goverdhan Parikarma since 1997)
- Ex. Member:- Delhi Vidyut Board (formerly DESU)
- Ex. Chairman:- Delhi College of Arts & Commerce (D.U.) and Deen Dayal Upadhaya College (D.U.)
