= Shoaib Iqbal =

Indian politician

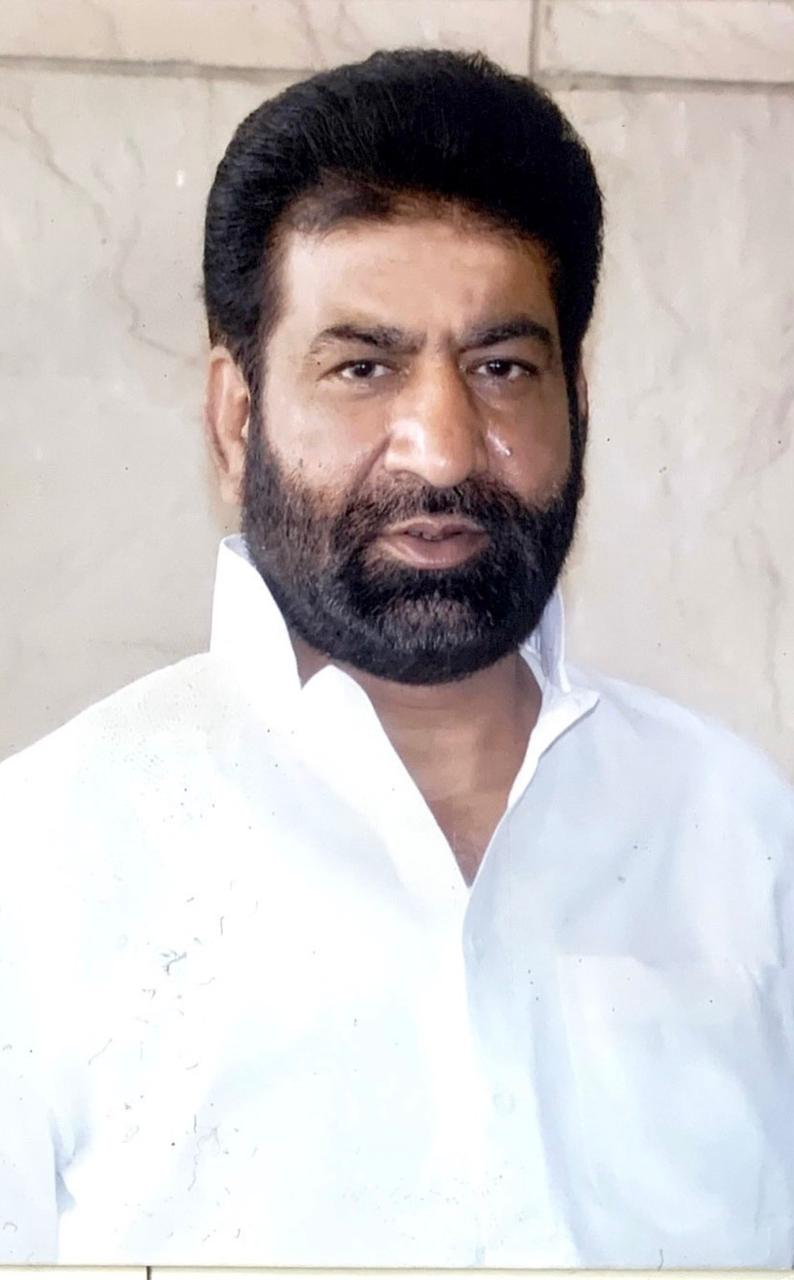

Member of the Delhi Legislative Assembly
- In office 12 February 2020 – 8 February 2025
- Preceded by: Asim Ahmed Khan
- Succeeded by: Aaley Mohammad Iqbal
- Constituency: Matia Mahal
- In office 2 December 1993 – 10 February 2015
- Preceded by: constituency established
- Succeeded by: Asim Ahmed Khan
- Constituency: Matia Mahal

Personal details
- Born: 1 May 1958 (age 68) Delhi, India
- Citizenship: Indian
- Party: All India Forward Bloc
- Other political affiliations: Aam Aadmi Party and (others)
- Children: Aaley Mohammad Iqbal; Ahmed Hasan Iqbal
- Relatives: Javed Iqbal, Suhail Iqbal (brother)
- Education: Anglo Arabic Senior Secondary School, Zakir Hussain College
- Occupation: Politician
- Profession: Businessman; politician

Shoaib Iqbal (born 1 May 1958) is an Indian politician and member of Delhi Legislative Assembly. He is a 6-time MLA from Matia Mahal (Vidhan Sabha constituency).

== Personal life ==
Shoaib Iqbal was married in 1980 and has two sons, Aaley Muhammad Iqbal and Ahmed Hasan Iqbal. Aaley Muhammad Iqbal was a Deputy Mayor of MCD.

His nephew Khurram Iqbal was a Councillor from Jama Masjid. His nephew's mother-in-law Sultana Abad Khan is the Councillor from Jama Masjid Ward.

== Political career ==
Shoaib Iqbal was active in student politics during his college days, and was the Secretary of the students union at Zakir Husain Delhi College.

Shoaib Iqbal has earned a reputation in early days by harassing poor people and demanding money from them to carry out construction activities. After the MCD officials tried to stop an illegal construction, Iqbal assaulted their officer. He was also involved in a controversial land deal between an alleged local mafia and Dubai-based company to open a luxury hotel near the Jama Masjid.

Shoaib contested his first election in 1993 on a Janata Dal ticket. Later, he joined Janata Dal (United) and headed the Minority Morcha of the party. In 2014, he joined Indian National Congress and subsequently won Delhi Legislative Assembly elections from Matia Mahal (Vidhan Sabha constituency) for five terms in 1993, 1998, 2003, 2008 and 2013. Shoaib was defeated by Asim Ahmed Khan of Aam Aadmi Party in the 2015 Delhi Legislative Assembly election. In 2020, Shoaib Iqbal joined the ruling Aam Aadmi Party, right before the 2020 Delhi Legislative Assembly election. He also served as Deputy Speaker of Delhi Legislative Assembly.

== Positions held ==
#	From	To	Position	Party	Comments
01	1993	1998	MLA, 1st Delhi Assembly	Janata Dal	Elected
02	1994	1995	Member, Committee on Privileges	Janata Dal	Appointed
03	1995	1997	Member, Committee on Assembly Rules	Janata Dal	Appointed
04	1996	1999	Member, Business Advisory Committee	Janata Dal	Appointed
05	1998	1999	Member, Committee on Private Member's Bills & Resolution	Janata Dal	Appointed
06	1998	2003	MLA, 2nd Delhi Assembly	Janata Dal (United)	Elected
07	1999	2003	Member, Business Advisory Committee	Janata Dal (United)	Appointed
08	2000	2003	Member, Committee on Assembly Rules	Janata Dal (United)	Appointed
09	2003	2008	MLA, 3rd Delhi Assembly	Janata Dal (Secular)	Elected
10	2003	2004	Member, Committee on Private Member's Bills & Resolution	Janata Dal (Secular)	Appointed
11	2004	2008	Deputy Speaker, Delhi Legislative Assembly	Janata Dal (Secular)	Appointed
12	2008	2013	MLA, 4th Delhi Assembly	Lok Janshakti Party	Elected
13	2009	2010	Member, Committee on Environment	Janata Dal (Secular)	Appointed
14	2013	2014	MLA, 5th Delhi Assembly	Janata Dal (United)	Elected
15	2020	-	MLA, 7th Delhi Assembly	Aam Aadmi Party	Elected
16	2020	-	Chairman: Standing Committee on Public Utilities and Civic Amenities related PWD, Jal Board, Power & Flood Control	Aam Aadmi Party	Appointed

== Electoral performance ==
Delhi Assembly elections, 2020: Matia Mahal
Party	Candidate	Votes	%	±%
AAP	Shoaib Iqbal	67,282	75.96	+16.73
BJP	Ravinder Gupta	17,041	19.24	+7.91
INC	Mirza Javed Ali	3,409	3.85	−22.90
BSP	Tej Ram	223	0.25	−0.24
NOTA	None of the above	216	0.24	−0.01
Majority		50,241	56.72	+24.24
Turnout		88,590	70.43	+1.12
AAP hold		Swing	+16.73	
