= Jai Prakash Aggarwal =

Indian politician

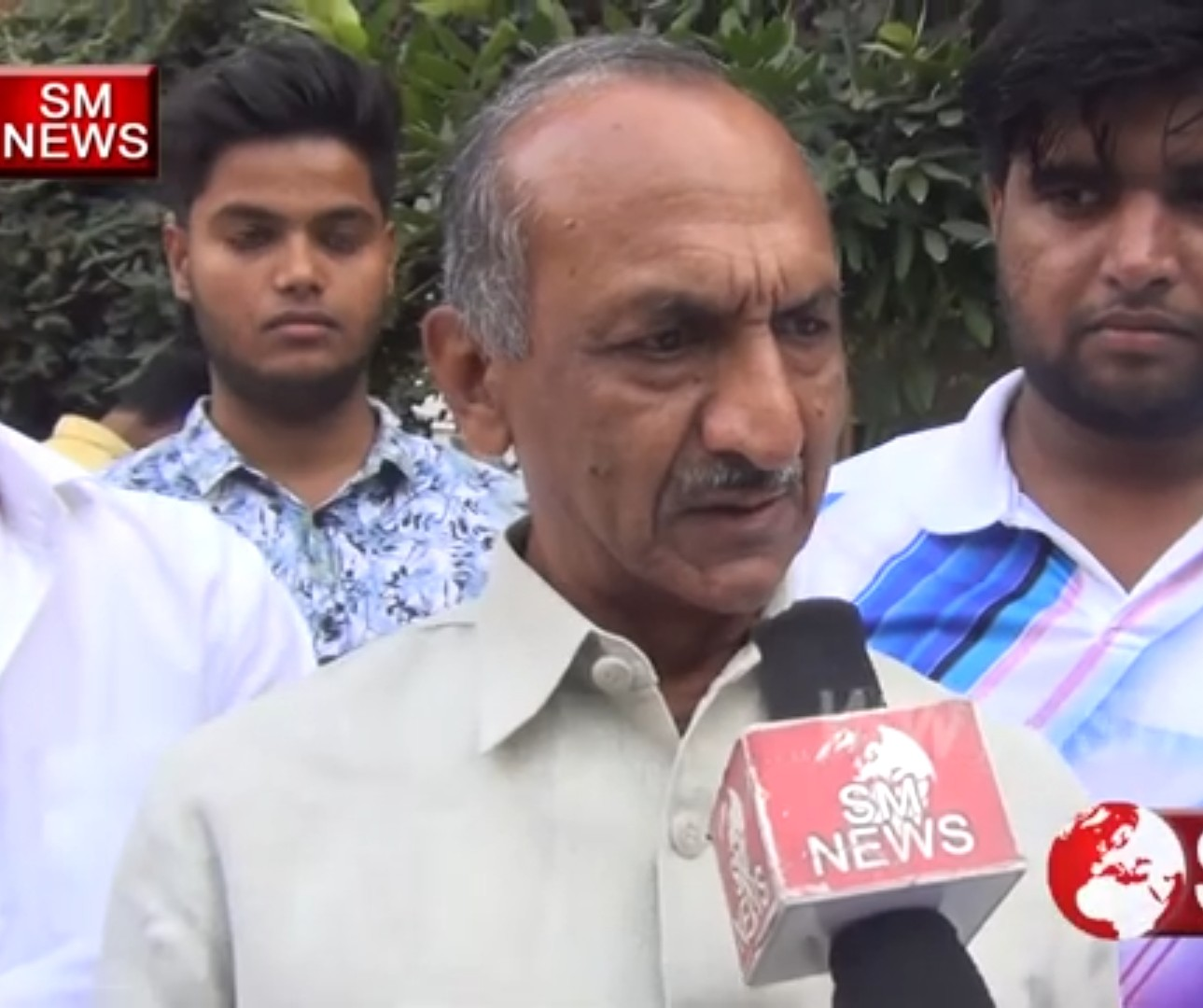

Member of Lok Sabha North East Delhi
- In office 2009–2014

Member of Rajya Sabha Delhi
- In office 2006–2009

Member of Lok Sabha Chandni Chowk
- In office 1984–1991
- In office 1996–1998

Personal details
- Born: 11 November 1944 (age 81) Delhi, British India
- Party: Indian National Congress
- Website: Official Loksabha Profile

Jai Prakash Aggarwal (born 11 November 1944) is a politician from the Indian National Congress and a former member of the Parliament of India who has represented North East Delhi and Chandni Chowk in the Lok Sabha, the lower house of the Indian Parliament, and Delhi in the Rajya Sabha, the upper house of the Indian Parliament.

His brother Atam Prakash Aggarwal is the Manager of Ramjas School Pusa Road located in Karol Bagh, Delhi.

In the 2009 Indian general election, he defeated the Bharatiya Janata Party candidate by a margin of over 200,000 votes. In the 2014 Indian general election, he lost to Bhartiya Janta Party candidate Manoj Tiwari by a margin of about 380,000 votes.

In 2024 Indian general elections, he lost to Praveen Khandelwal from Chandni Chowk seat by a margin of 80,000 votes.

== Positions held ==
Year	Description
1983–1984	Deputy Mayor, Delhi: Chairman, Standing Committee, Municipal Corporation of Delhi; Leader, Congress Party, Municipal Corporation of Delhi
1984–1989	Elected to 8th Lok Sabha: Member, Estimates Committee
1989–1991	Elected to 9th Lok Sabha (2nd term): Member, Estimates Committee
1996–1998	Elected to 11th Lok Sabha (3rd term)
2006–2009	Elected to the Rajya Sabha from Delhi: Member, Joint Parliamentary Committee on Food Management in Parliament House Complex; Chairman, House Committee, Rajya Sabha; Member, General Purposes Committee; Member, Consultative Committee, Ministry of Shipping, Road Transport and Highways; Member, Committee on Commerce
2009	Elected to 15th Lok Sabha (4th term): Chairman, House Committee; Member, Committee on Urban Development; Member, General Purposes Committee; Member, JPC to Examine Matters Relating to Allocation and Pricing of Telecom Licences and Spectrum
