= Alexander Montague Stow =

British administrator in India (1873–1936)

Sir Alexander Montague Stow, KCIE, OBE (13 December 1873 – 27 June 1936) was an administrator in British India. A member of the Indian Civil Service, he was Chief Commissioner of Delhi from 1926 to 1928 and a member of the Executive Council of the Governor of Punjab from 1928 to 1930.

His son Sir John Montague Stow was Governor-General of Barbados.
