= Indians in the Netherlands =

Indians in the Netherlands Indiërs in Nederland
Total population
- 65,399; 240,000 (estimated including Indo-Caribbean)

Regions with significant populations
- Amsterdam, Amstelveen, The Hague, Eindhoven, Utrecht, Rotterdam, Almere, Delft, Haarlemmermeer, Zoetermeer

Languages
- Dutch, English, Sarnami Hindustani, Hindi-Urdu, Punjabi, Tamil, Telugu, Gujarati, Marathi, Sinhala, Other Indian languages

Religion
- Hinduism, Sikhism, Islam, Christianity, Buddhism, Jainism

Related ethnic groups
- Indian diaspora, Indian people, Indo-Surinamese, Dutch Tamils, Dutch South Asians, South Asian diaspora

Indians in the Netherlands are residents of Indian origin in the Netherlands. The majority of the people of Indian descent in the Netherlands are of Indo-Surinamese origin. More recently the flow of emigrants from India has increased.

== History ==
In 2017, 8,630 Indians immigrated to the Netherlands, making them the second largest immigrant group after the Syrians. Most were employed in information technology and information services. Between 2012 and 2017, the number of Indian immigrants more than doubled with 8,600 immigrants per year. Between January and November 2019, 6,322 Indians immigrated to the Netherlands. In 2003, around 1 in 3 Indian immigrants left within six years of arriving in the Netherlands.

In 2019, about 48,724 people of Indian immigrant descent lived in the Netherlands. Most live in Amsterdam, Rotterdam, and the Hague.

Between 2016 and 2022, the Indian population doubled from 32,682 to 65,399 (excluding Indo-Surinamese).

=== Indo-Surinamese ===
After the abolition of slavery in the Dutch colony of Suriname, the Dutch government signed the Anglo-Dutch Treaties of 1870-1871 with the United Kingdom, which outlined the recruitment of contract workers from British India. Indians began migrating to Suriname in 1873 from what was then British India as indentured labourers, mostly from the modern-day Indian states of Uttar Pradesh, Bihar and surrounding regions.

Until Suriname's independence in 1975, all Indo-Surinamese were formally part of the Kingdom of the Netherlands and thus held Dutch passports. After independence, a significant portion of the Indo-Surinamese population migrated to the Netherlands, retaining their Dutch passports. In 2024, the Surinami-Hindustani community numbered 200,000.

Indo-Surinamese are also known in the Netherlands and Suriname by the Dutch term Hindoestanen, derived from the word Hindustani, literally, "someone from Hindustan". Hence, when Indians migrated to Suriname they were referred to as Hindustanis, people of Indian origin.

== Statistics ==
In December 2001, the High Level Committee on Indian Diaspora estimated the population of PIOs and Indian citizens at 215,000. According to the Dutch governmental institution Statistics Netherlands (CBS), 65,339 individuals were of Indian origin as of 31 May 2022. The Embassy of India states that the Netherlands has the "second largest population of people of Indian origin in Europe (next only to UK)" and that it is "home to about 220,000 Indian and Surinamese Hindustani Diaspora." The Netherlands India Chamber of Commerce & Trade (NICCT) states that there are about 25,000 Indians or persons of Indian origin, excluding the Surinamese Hindustanis.

== Notable people ==
- Rattan Chadha, businessman
- Anice Das, speed skater
- Ram Labhaya Lakhina, entrepreneur and community leader
- Mangesh Panchal, cricketer

== See also ==
- India–Netherlands relations
- Hinduism in the Netherlands
- Indian diaspora
- Indo-Surinamese
- Romani people in the Netherlands

== Sources ==
- Adhin, J. H. (1961). "De immigratie van Hindostanen en de afstand van de Goudkust". Nieuwe West-Indische Gids. 41 (1): 4–13. doi:10.1163/22134360-90002334.
