= Delhi University Students Union =

Student organisation

- Abbreviation: DUSU
- Formation: April 9, 1949; 77 years ago
- Type: Student Organization
- Legal status: Non-profit organizations
- Headquarters: Chhatra Marg, Delhi University North Campus, Delhi-110007, India
- Coordinates: 28.6878340°N 77.2088325°E
- President: Yash Dabas
- Vice President: Deepanshu Shokeen
- Secretary: Riya Chhawadi
- Joint Secretary: Lakshay Raj Singh Rathore

The Delhi University Students Union (DUSU) is the world’s largest student body, with over 700,000 students spread over 91 affiliated colleges and 16 faculties. It was established in 1949, and in 1954 the first DUSU elections were held. It is the representative body of the students from member colleges and university faculties and teaching departments. The students of member colleges and university faculties & teaching departments are the members of the union. The Vice–Chancellor of the University of Delhi is the patron of the union. The official year and term of the union is from 16th of August of every year to the 15th of August of the following year.

== History ==
Ever since its establishment in 1922, students of Delhi University were deeply involved in the Independence Movement against British Colonial rule. There had been a long–standing demand for establishing a student body in the university, finally, in 1947 under the chairmanship of V. K. R. V. Rao, then head of the DU economics department, a provisional committee that included presidents of all constituent college unions was authorised to draft the constitution of the Delhi University Students’ Union. Finally, DUSU was inaugurated by then Prime Minister Jawaharlal Nehru on April 9, 1949.

Over the years, several DUSU members have gone on to have notable careers in Indian politics, including several Ministers: Arun Jaitley, Vijay Goel, Vijay Jolly, Ajay Maken, Rekha Gupta and Alka Lamba. DUSU has a budget of approximately Twenty–Four lakhs INR. Every member of union pay Twenty INR as an annual subscription to union funds which is collected along with the fees collected at the time of admission by the respective college or institutions.

== Elections ==
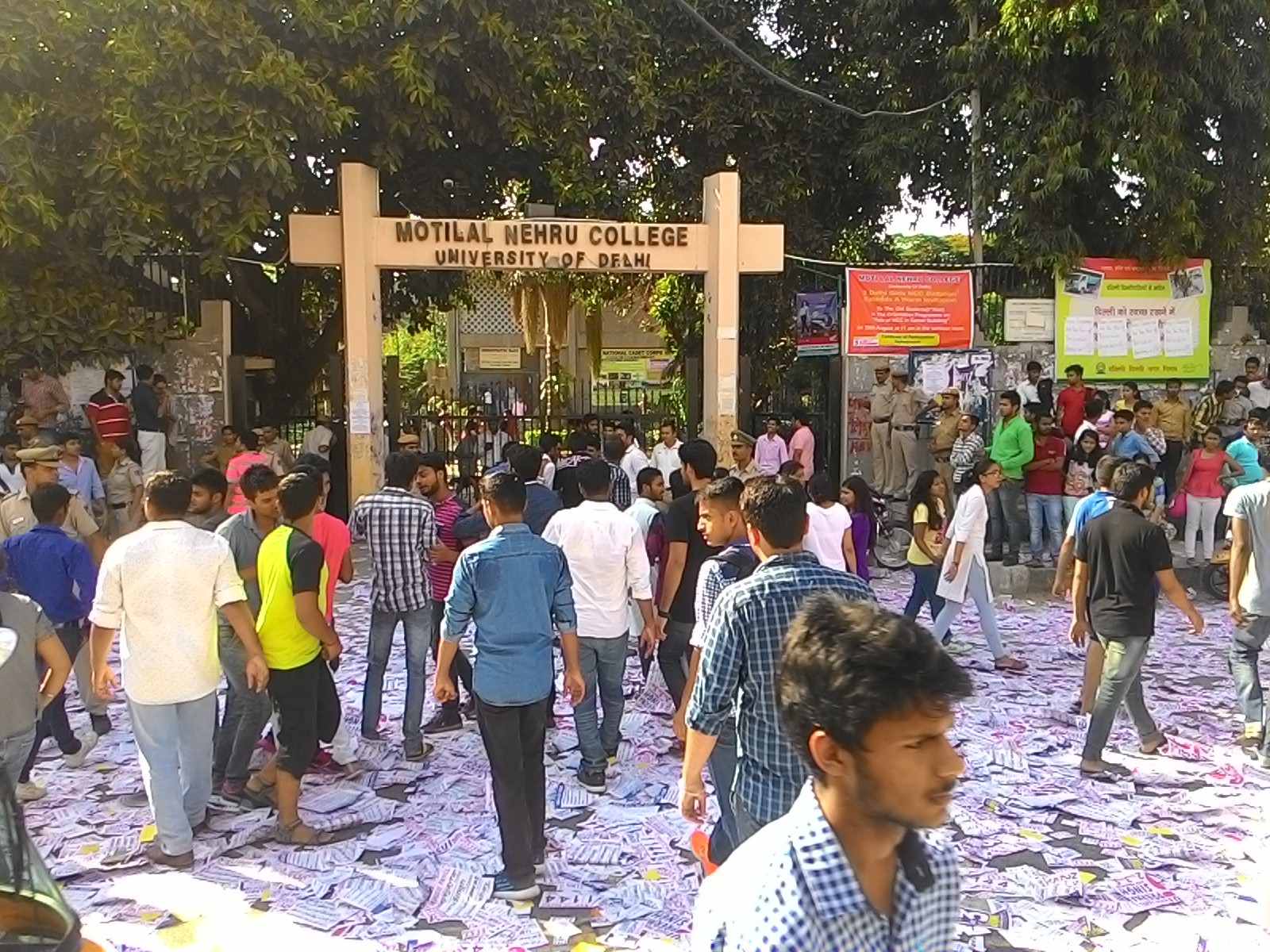
Campaigning during DUSU elections

Elections to the union are held by direct voting by the students of the university faculties & teaching departments and member colleges. Member colleges and university faculties have their own college or faculty students' union. The DUSU is a university–level umbrella organisation for university faculties and member colleges' student unions. The DUSU has four office bearers: President, Vice President, Secretary and Joint–Secretary. DUSU also includes one or two Central Councillor(s) from each college affiliated with DUSU, who are directly elected by the college. The President of each college affiliated with DUSU is also a member of the central council of DUSU.

The elections are usually held in July–August of each year. As of 2019 there are total of 52 Delhi University colleges & faculties affiliated to DUSU.

Delhi University politics is called the “mini theatre of national politics”, and thus all major national parties invest heavily in the elections. Amongst all the Student elections in India, DUSU elections "gain most nationwide attention" besides Jawaharlal Nehru University Students' Union. With 1.45 lakhs+ students voting, DUSU elections are the biggest democratic election at an academic campus every year.

== List of DUSU officeholders ==
Term	President	Vice President	Secretary	Joint Secretary	Ref
1954–55	Gajraj Bahadur Nagar				
1955–56	Pran Sabharwal	Yadukul Bhushan	HD Tulisdas		
1956–57	Yadukul Bhushan	Ranjendaran Giri	Ashok Kumar Tanwar		
1957–58	Krishnanand Sharma	Shri Ram Sethi	Adish Jain		
1958–59	Narinder Kumar Mehta (Independent)	Surender Chawla	Kamal Kapoor		
1959–60	Ram Labhaya Lakhina	Sudershan Chawla	Ashwani Seth		
1960–61	Viresh Pratap Chaudhury (NSUI)	Swami Poornanand	Madan Saluja		
1961–62	Madan Saluja	Som Nath Dhawan	Shyam Sunder Bhatia	Ved Sharma	
1962–63	Joginder Singh Sethi (NSUI)	KB Thukral	Yashpal Sharma		
1963–64	Narendra Nath Kalia (NSUI)	SP Oberai	Surender Sethi	Bahadur Singh	
1964–65	Surinder Seth	Bahadur Singh	Rajvanshal Jain	Ved Prakash	
1965–66	Ashok Marwah	Rajkumar Jain	MM Singh Juneja	Ved Kharbanda	
1966–67	Subhash Goel	Subhash Chugh	Pradeep Seth		
1967–68	Harcharan Singh Josh (NSUI)	Shanti Diwan	Vijay Seth		
1968–69	Ajit Singh Chadha	Attar Singh	Ramesh Verma	Vishnu Kumar	
1969–70	Subhash Sahni	Ashok Gandhi		AK Dhawan	
1970–71	Subhash Chopra (NSUI)	Omprakash Suman		Hansraj	
1971–72	Bhagwan Singh (ABVP)	Kamal Kumar Kakkar	Sher Singh Dagar (ABVP)	Rakesh Bhushan	
1972–73	Sri Ram Khanna (ABVP)	Arun Jaitley (ABVP)			
1973–74	Alok Kumar (ABVP)				
1974–75	Arun Jaitley (ABVP)	Vijay Bindal		Purnima Sethi (ABVP)	
1975–76	Elections not held due to the emergency				
1976–77	Elections not held due to the emergency				
1977–78	Vijay Goel (ABVP)	Sunil Mittal (ABVP)	Rajat Sharma (ABVP)	T Joggulamba (ABVP)	
1978–79	Hari Shankar Gupta (NSUI rebel)	Sonia Sobti	Vijay Jolly (ABVP)	Pinky Anand	
1979–80	Rajesh Oberoi	Bharti Kumari	Pinky Anand	Amit Sinha	
1980–81	Vijay Jolly (ABVP)	Jaswant Yadav	Sushil Kumar	Sanjay Khanna	
1981–82	Sudhanshu Mittal (ABVP)	Arti Mehra	Ajit Pandey	Yogesh Sharma	
1982–83	Yogesh Sharma (ABVP)	Satish Upadhyay (ABVP)	RP Singh	Meera Aggarwal	
1983–84	Anil Soni	Balram Yadav	Naresh Sharma	Anju Malhotra	
1984–85	Balram Yadav (ABVP)	Vijender Gupta (ABVP)	Satpal Dhunna	Meera Aggarwal	
1985–86	Ajay Maken (NSUI)	Madan Singh Bisht	Rajesh Garg	Neeraj Bala	
1986–87	Madan Singh Bisht (DCM)	Anju Malhotra	Narender Tandon	Neena Sachdeva	
1987–88	Narender Tondon (ABVP)	Avdesh Mishra	Anju Sachdeva	Ashish Sood (ABVP)	
1988–89	Ashish Sood (ABVP)	Anju Sachdeva	Hari Om	Kamal Kant Sharma	
1989–90 (Note: Term extended till 1991)	Anju Sachdeva	Avdesh Sharma	Kamal Kant Sharma	Sunita Wadhera	
1990–91	Elections cancelled due to Mandal Commission protests				
1991–92	Rajiv Goswami (Independent)	Rama Kant	Sonia Seth	Ajay Chauhan	
1992–93	Avdesh Sharma (ABVP)	Archana Sharma	Monica Kakkar (ABVP)		
1993–94	Monica Kakkar (ABVP)	Ajay Chauhan	Shalu Malik (NSUI)		
1994–95	Shalu Malik (NSUI)	Deepak Kumar Tyagi	Vandana Mishra	Tarun Tyagi	
1995–96	Alka Lamba (NSUI)	Narendra Kumar Yadav	Rekha Jindal (ABVP)	Rajneesh Jindal	
1996–97	Rekha Jindal (ABVP)	Anil Jha Vats (ABVP)	Surender Goel	Poonam Parashar	
1997–98	Anil Jha Vats (ABVP)	Jayant Singh Chauhan (ABVP)		Jitender Choudhary	
1998–99	Thakur Jaivir Rana (ABVP)	Anil Solanki (ABVP)		Sanjay Choudhary	
1999–2000	Ritu Verma (ABVP)	Amit Malik (NSUI)	Neetu Verma (NSUI)	Arun Khatana	
2000–01	Amit Malik (NSUI)	Neetu Verma (NSUI)		Harsh Chaudhary	
2001–02	Neetu Verma (NSUI)	Nakul Bhardwaj (ABVP)	Vikas Shokeen	Rohit Choudhary	
2002–03	Nakul Bhardwaj (ABVP)	Sunder Daagar		Ashok Basoya	
2003–04	Rohit Chaudhary (NSUI)	Narinder Tokas (NSUI)	Ragini Nayak (NSUI)	Pankaj Kochar	
2004–05	Narinder Tokas (NSUI)	Ashok Basoya	Amrita Dhawan (NSUI)	Gaurav Khari (ABVP)	
2005–06	Ragini Nayak (NSUI)	Amrita Dhawan (NSUI)	Ramit Sherawat (NSUI)	Deepak Choudhary (NSUI)	
2006–07	Amrita Dhawan (NSUI)	Vikas Dahiya (ABVP)	Shashikant (NSUI)	Tarun Tanwar (NSUI)	
2007–08	Amrita Bahari (NSUI)	Devraj Tehlan (NSUI)	Manish Choudhary (NSUI)	Khusboo Sharma (NSUI)	
2008–09	Nupur Sharma (ABVP)	Manohar Nagar (NSUI)	Amit Choudhary (NSUI)	Ashish Gahlot (NSUI)	
2009–10	Manoj Choudhary (ABVP)	Kirti Wadhera (ABVP)	Ashradeep Kaur (NSUI)	Anupriya Tyagi (SCS) (ABVP backed)	
2010–11	Jitender Choudhary (ABVP)	Priya Dabas (ABVP)	Neetu Dabas (ABVP)	Akshay Kumar (NSUI)	
2011–12	Ajay Chhikara (NSUI)	Vikas Choudhary (ABVP)	Vikas Yadav (ABVP)	Deepak Bansal (ABVP)	
2012–13	Arun Hooda (NSUI)	Varun Khari (NSUI)	Varun Choudhry (NSUI)	Vishnu Basoya (Note: Served six months because the election was tied) (ABVP)	
2012–13	Arun Hooda (NSUI)	Varun Khari (NSUI)	Varun Choudhry (NSUI)	Raveena Choudhary (NSUI)	
2013–14	Aman Awana (ABVP)	Utkarsh Chaudhary (ABVP)	Karishma Thakur (NSUI)	Raju Rawat (ABVP)	
2014–15	Mohit Nagar (ABVP)	Parvesh Malik (ABVP)	Kanika Shekhawat (ABVP)	Ashutosh Mathur (ABVP)	
2015–16	Satender Awana (ABVP)	Sunny Dedha (ABVP)	Anjali Rana (ABVP)	Chhatarpal Yadav (ABVP)	
2016–17	Amit Tanwar (ABVP)	Priyanka Chhawri (ABVP)	Ankit Sangwan (ABVP)	Mohit Garid (NSUI)	
2017–18	Rocky Tusheed (NSUI)	Kunal Sehrawat (NSUI)	Mahamedhaa Nagar (ABVP)	Uma Shankar (ABVP)	
2018–19	Shakti Singh (ABVP)	Shakti Singh (ABVP) (upgraded to President)	Akash Choudhary (NSUI)	Jyoti Chaudhary (ABVP)	
2019–20	Akshit Daiya (ABVP)	Pradeep Tanwar (ABVP)	Ashish Lamba (NSUI)	Shivangi Kharwal (ABVP)	
2020–21	Elections cancelled due to COVID-19 pandemic in India				
2021–22	Elections cancelled due to COVID-19 pandemic in India				
2022–23	Elections cancelled due to COVID-19 pandemic in India				
2023–24	Tushar Dedha (ABVP)	Abhi Dahiya (NSUI)	Aparajita Thakur (ABVP)	Sachin Baisla (ABVP)	
2024–25	Rounak Khatri (NSUI)	Bhanu Pratap Singh (ABVP)	Mitravinda Karanwal (ABVP)	Lokesh Choudhary (NSUI)	
2025–26	Aryan Maan (ABVP)	Rahul Jhansla (NSUI)	Kunal Chaudhary (ABVP)	Deepika Jha (ABVP)	
2026–27	Yash Dabas (ABVP)	Deepanshu Shokeen (Independent)	Riya Chhawdi (ABVP)	Lakshay Raj Singh (ABVP)	

== Alumni ==
- Madan Singh Bisht, MLA from Dwarahat
- Viresh Pratap Chaudhry, awarded Padma Shri
- Vijay Goel, former MoS for Parliamentary Affairs
- Hari Shankar Gupta, former MLA from Wazirpur
- Rekha Gupta, Chief Minister of Delhi
- Vijender Gupta, Speaker of Delhi Legislative Assembly
- Ram Lakhina, founder of NICCT, awarded Pravasi Bharatiya Samman
- Arun Jaitley, former Minister of Finance
- Vijay Jolly, former MLA from Saket
- Alka Lamba, former MLA from Chandni Chowk
- Sudhanshu Mittal, President of International Kho Kho Federation
- Ajay Maken, former Minister of Housing and Urban Poverty Alleviation
- Gajraj Bahadur Nagar, former Haryana Food and Supplies Minister
- Purnima Sethi, former Minister in Delhi
- Nupur Sharma, former National Spokesperson of BJP
- Rajat Sharma, founder of India TV, awarded Padma Bhushan
- Ashish Sood, Delhi Home Minister
- Satish Upadhyay, MLA from Malviya Nagar
- Anil Jha Vats, Deputy Leader of Opposition Delhi

== Sources ==
- Delhi University: Celebrating 100 Glorious Years. By Hardeep S. Puri · 2022. Rupa Publishers. ISBN 9789355203885.
