= South Asians in the Netherlands =

Migrant group in the Netherlands

Total population
- Surinamese – 200,000 (Indo-Surinamese only); Indian – 65,399; Afghan – 54,991; Pakistani – 27,261; Sri Lankan – 14,708; Bangladeshi – 3,504; Nepalese – 2,652; Bhutanese – 342; Maldivians – 39; All figures are the 2022 CBS population estimates for the Netherlands, except the estimates of the Indo-Surinamese population.

Regions with significant populations
- Amsterdam; Rotterdam; The Hague; Utrecht; Eindhoven; Almere; Amstelveen

Languages
- Dutch; English; Sarnami; Sranan Tongo; Punjabi; Hindi–Urdu; Nepali; Pashto; Tamil; Sinhala; Bengali; Telugu; Gujarati; Marathi; Other South Asian languages

Religion
- Majority: Hinduism; Significant Minority: Islam; Sikhism; Other Minority: Christianity; Jainism; Buddhism; Zoroastrianism; Baháʼí; Others

Related ethnic groups
- South Asian Americans; Indo-Caribbean Americans; South Asian Canadians; British South Asians; British Indo-Caribbeans; South Asian diaspora

South Asians in the Netherlands (Dutch: Zuid-Aziaten in Nederland), also referred to as South Asian Dutch (Zuid-Aziatische Nederlanders) or Dutch South Asians (Nederlandse Zuid-Aziaten), are citizens or residents of the Netherlands whose ancestry traces back to South Asia. They are a subcategory of Dutch Asians.

The majority of the South Asian community in the Netherlands are Indo-Caribbean and migrated mainly from Suriname, a former Dutch colony in the Caribbean and South America. There is a smaller amount of South Asians, coming directly from South Asia, mainly from India, Pakistan and Afghanistan. South Asians in the Netherlands retain their cultural and religious identities, with many establishing their own communities while also integrating into Dutch society.

== History ==
The initial South Asian settlers in the Netherlands were Indian traders, small-scale entrepreneurs, and textile industry workers from Punjab who arrived in the 1940s and 1950s. In the 1970s, Pakistanis migrated followed by smaller groups of Indians and Sri Lankans, including those fleeing Uganda during the Asian expulsion. Early migrants primarily sought employment, often working in unskilled jobs. Between the 1980s and 2002, Afghan refugees and Sri Lankan Tamils left violence in their native countries and immigrated to the Netherlands.

However, most people of South Asian descent in the Netherlands as of 2022 are primarily of Indo-Surinamese descent, known locally as Hindustanis. After the independence of Suriname in 1975, many Indo-Surinamese people migrated to the Netherlands and became Dutch residents. A significant number of them settled in The Hague and other large Dutch cities. In 1980, there was a military coup in Suriname, which caused another wave of Indo-Surinamese migrants.

== Indo-Caribbeans ==
=== Indo-Surinamese ===
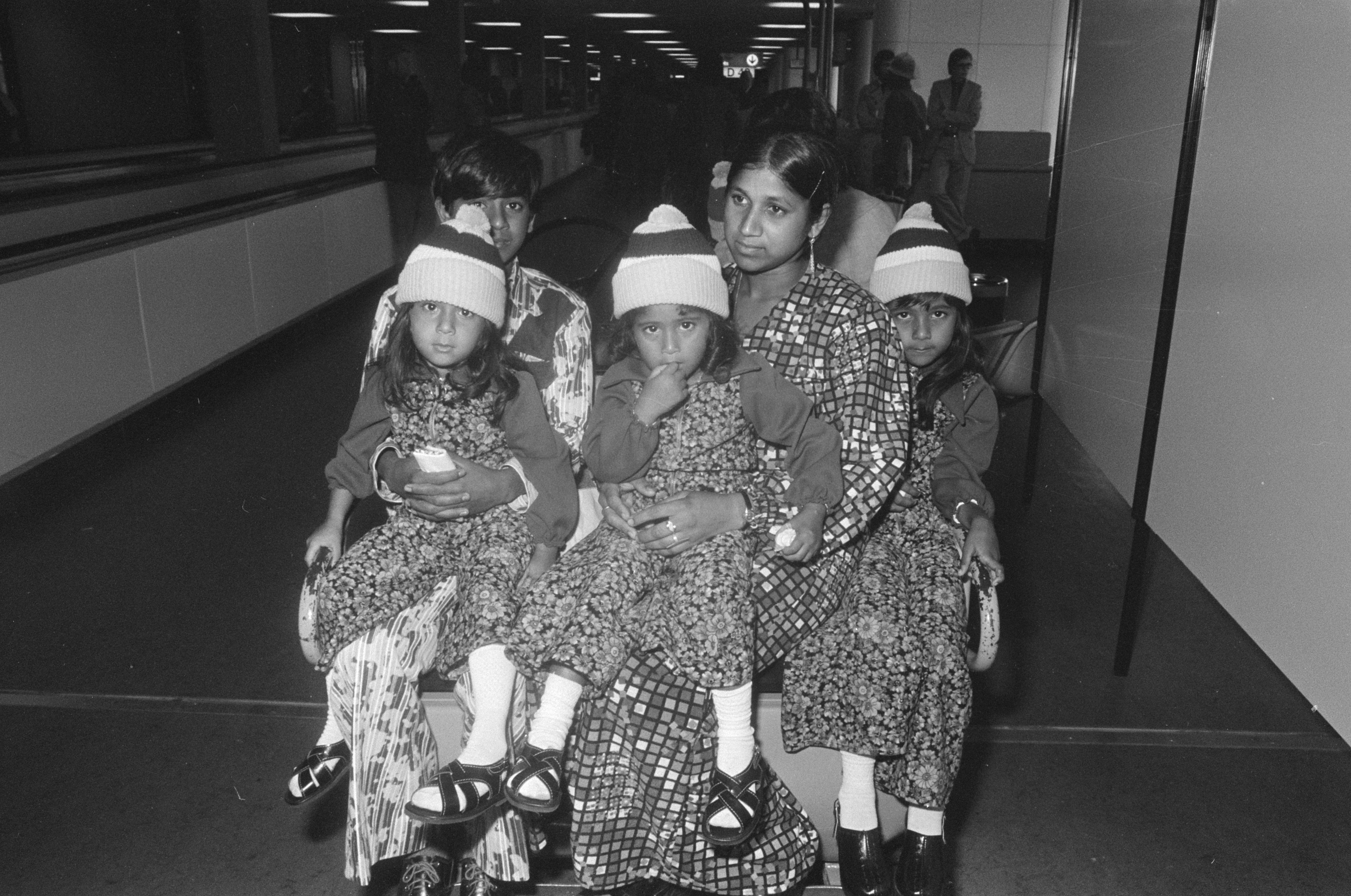
Hundreds of Surinamese people arriving at Schiphol, including (Hindustani) children

After the abolition of slavery in the Dutch colony of Suriname, the Dutch government signed the Anglo-Dutch Treaties of 1870-1871 with the United Kingdom, which outlined the recruitment of contract workers from British India. Indians began migrating to Suriname in 1873 from what was then British India as indentured labourers, mostly from the modern-day Indian states of Uttar Pradesh, Bihar, Bengal and the surrounding regions.

Up until the independence of Suriname in 1975, all the Indo-Surinamese were formally part of the Kingdom of the Netherlands and thus owned a Dutch passport. After the independence a significant portion of the Indo-Surinamese population migrated to the Netherlands, thereby retaining their Dutch passport. Currently there are more than 120,000 Indo-Surinamese living in the Netherlands, of which the majority, about 50,000, in The Hague and surroundings.

Indo-Surinamese are also known in both the Netherlands and Suriname by the Dutch term Hindoestanen, derived from the word Hindustani, lit., "someone from Hindustan". Hence, when South Asians migrated to Suriname they were referred to as Hindustanis, people of South Asian origin.

=== Others ===
There are also Indo-Surinamese people who have migrated to the Netherlands from French Guiana or the former Netherlands Antilles; now Curaçao, Aruba, Bonaire, Sint Maarten, Sint Eustatius and Saba.

There is also a small group of Indo-Guyanese people, mainly because many Guyanese people in the Netherlands are (descendants of) migrants who previously lived in Suriname and who migrated to the Netherlands together with Surinamese people after Suriname's independence in 1975.

== Indians ==
=== History ===
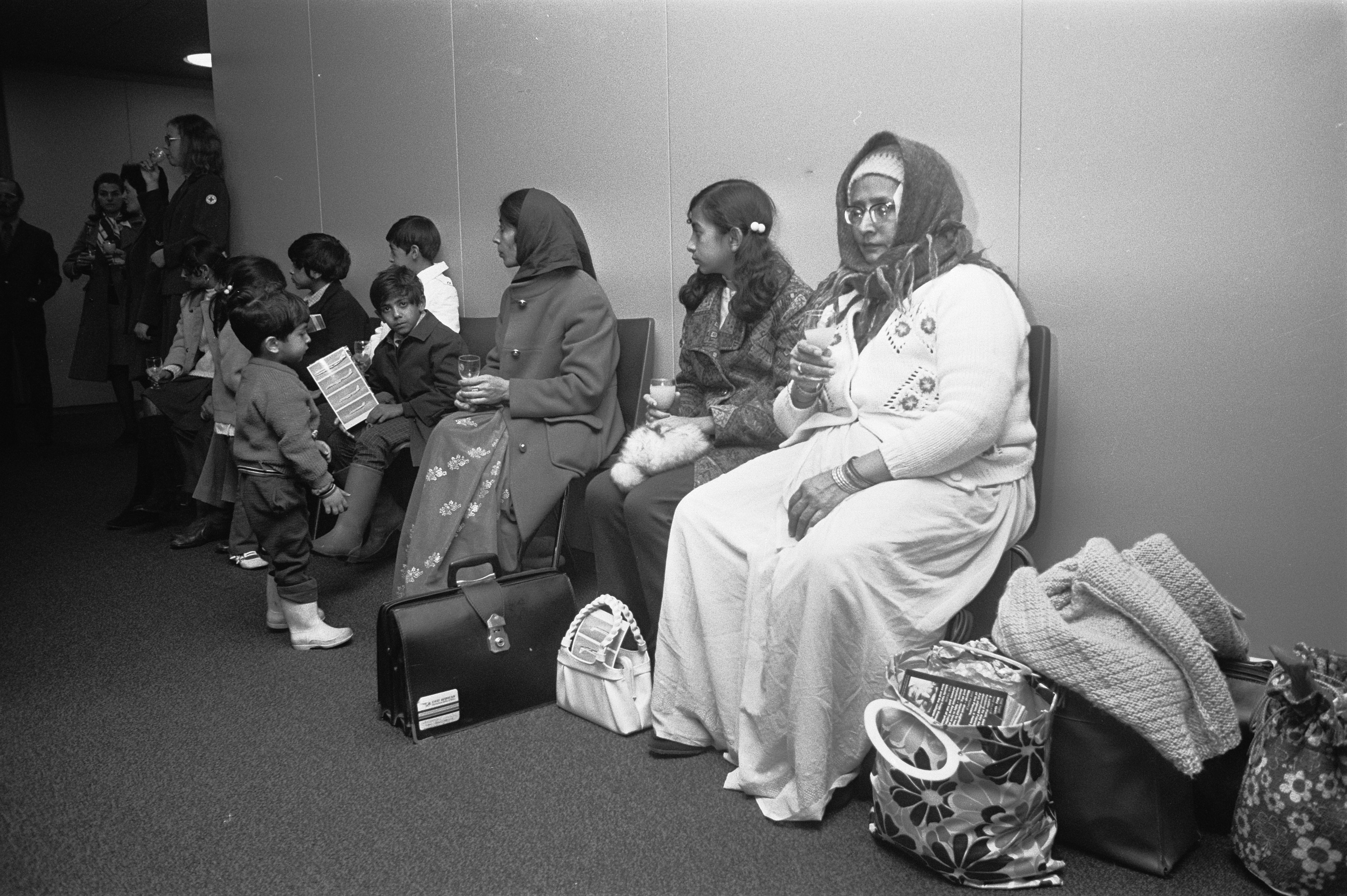
Indians expulsed from Uganda at Schiphol

In 2017, 8,630 Indians immigrated to the Netherlands, ranking as the second largest immigrant group after the Syrians. Most were skilled in information technology and information services. Moreover, the number of Indians who came to study in the Netherlands has more than tripled: from 425 migrant students in 2012 to 1,400 migrant students in 2017. Between January and November 2019, 6,322 Indians immigrated to the Netherlands. Around 45 percent of Indian immigrants leave within six months of arriving in the Netherlands.

As of 2019, about 48,724 people of Indian immigrant descent lived in the Netherlands. Most of them live in the provinces of North Holland, South Holland and North Brabant.

From 2016 to 2022 the population of Indians in the Netherlands doubled from 32,682 to 65,399.This number excludes Indo-Surinamese individuals.

=== Statistics ===
In December 2001, the High Level Committee on Indian Diaspora estimated the population of PIOs and Indian citizens at 215,000. According to the Dutch governmental institution Statistics Netherlands (CBS), 65,339 individuals were of Indian origin as of 31 May 2022. The Embassy of India states that the Netherlands has the "second largest population of people of Indian origin in Europe (next only to UK)" and that it is "home to about 220,000 Indian and Surinamese Hindustani Diaspora." The Netherlands India Chamber of Commerce & Trade (NICCT) states that there are about 25,000 Indians or persons of Indian origin, excluding the Surinamese Hindustanis.

== Afghans ==
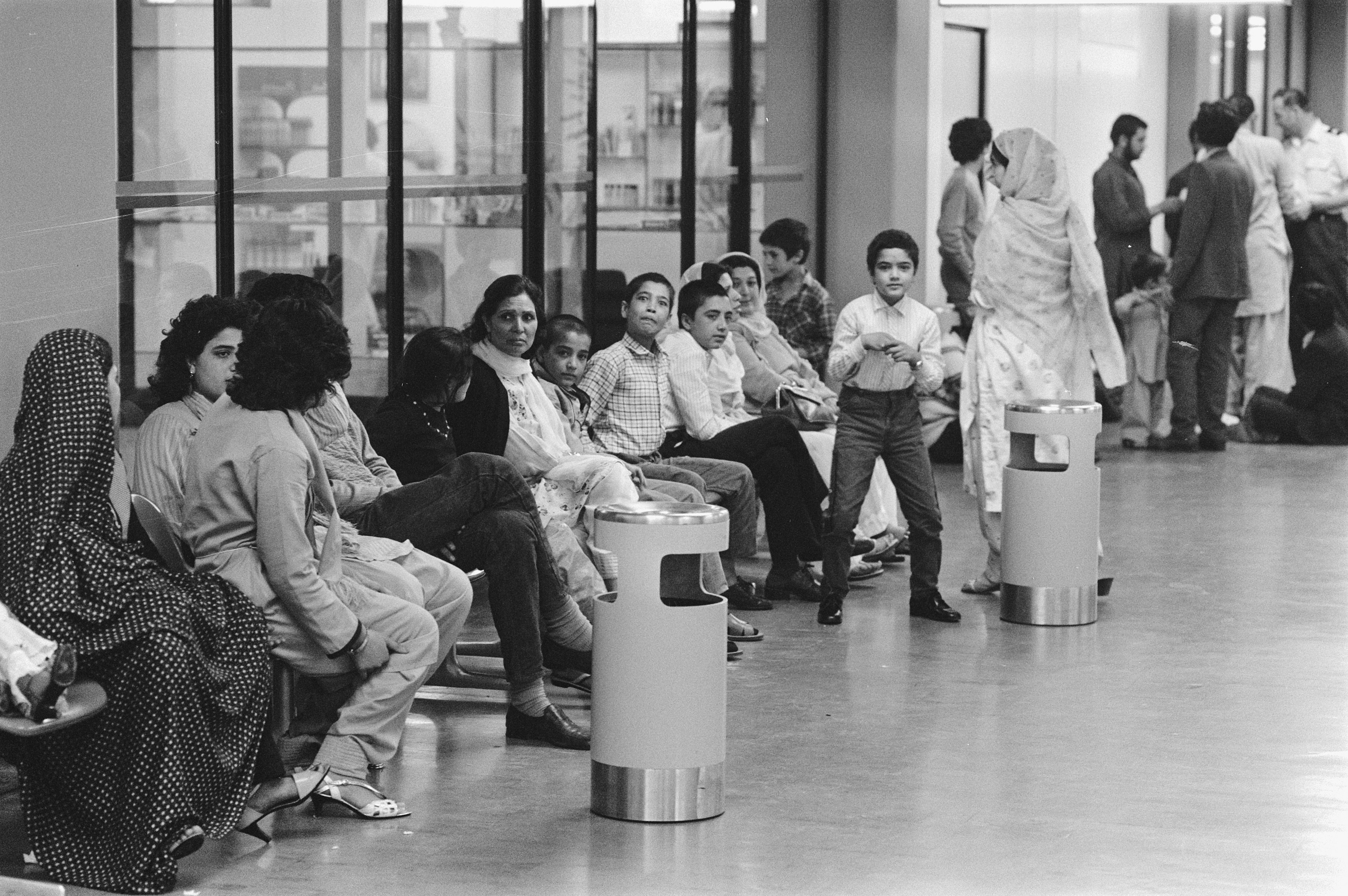
Group of 49 Afghan refugees at Schiphol

In 2014, 44,000 Dutch Afghans resided in the Netherlands, one of the largest Afghan diaspora communities as well as one of the main Asian communities in the Netherlands. Most of the first generation immigrants settled in the Netherlands between 1992 and 2001.

=== History ===
Afghan refugees began entering into the Netherlands in the late 1980s, fleeing violence in their homeland. In the decade up to 2002, the Netherlands was the second-most popular destination in Europe for Afghan asylum-seekers, behind Germany; they made up more than 20% of the total of roughly 170,000 applications for asylum filed by Afghans in Europe. The Dutch government settled them in a variety of areas with the policy aim of preventing the formation of large immigrant communities in the cities. The number of asylum requests peaked in 1998.

As a result of the increasing inflow of asylum-seekers, the Dutch government set up a war crimes investigation unit in the late 1990s; the first refugees they charged with war crimes were Heshamuddin Hesam and Habibulla Jalalzoy, both former members of the Afghan intelligence service KHAD during the 1980s Soviet–Afghan War. Their presence, evoked a great deal of unrest and fear among the Netherlands' Afghan community. Charged with abusing prisoners in a 2005 trial, they received sentences of 12 and 9 years in prison, respectively.

In 2003, the Netherlands signed a voluntary repatriation agreement with the United Nations High Commission for Refugees and the transitional government of Afghanistan, recognising the right of Afghan refugees in the Netherlands to return to Afghanistan and establishing procedures. However, by 2007, only 800 had returned; most refugees feel that public safety, women's rights, and educational conditions in Afghanistan are insufficient. Young people who choose to return may also encounter language difficulties, as they exhibit language shift towards Dutch and away from Dari.

== Pakistanis ==
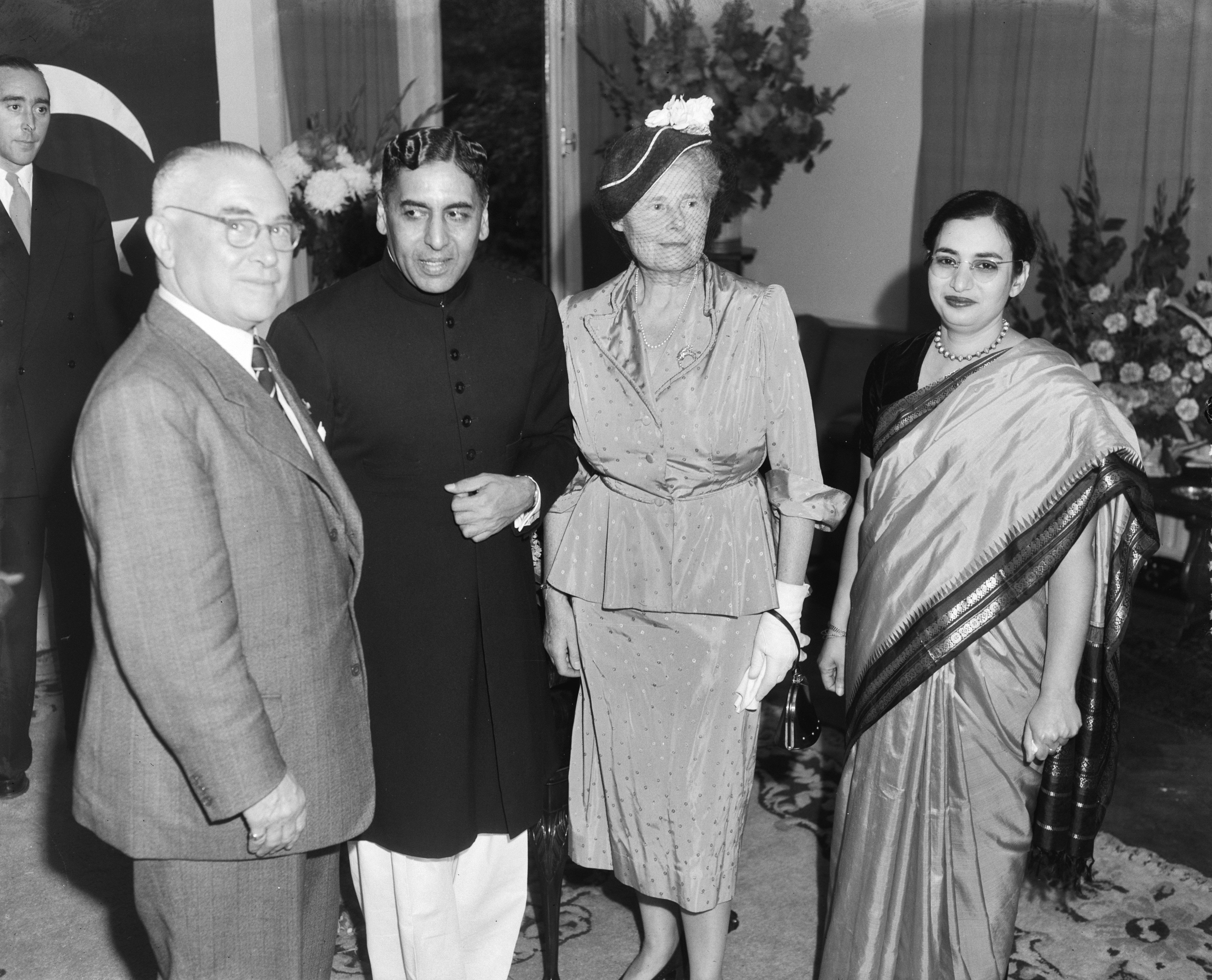
Reception of an official from Pakistan in The Hague including Minister Stikker

As of 1 January 2022, statistics published by the Netherlands' Centraal Bureau voor de Statistiek indicated that the Pakistani population (i.e., individuals either born in Pakistan or with at least one Pakistani parent) numbered 27,261.

Pakistanis from urban areas began migrating to the Netherlands in the 1960s, later than Pakistanis migrating to the United Kingdom. A substantial number of immigrants come from the Punjab province.

=== Social integration challenges ===
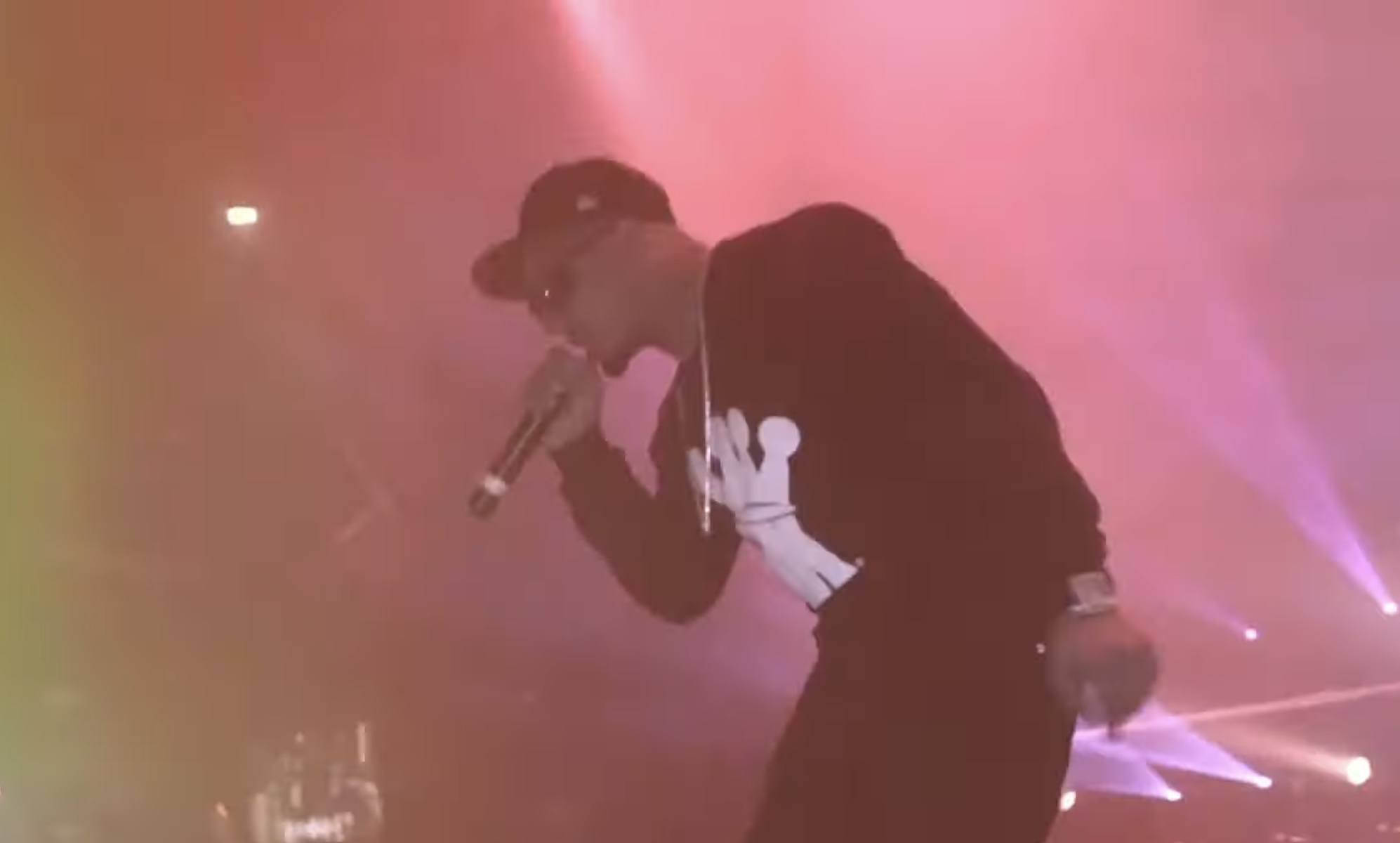
Imran Khan, a famous Dutch-Pakistani singer

Due to the language barrier and racial discrimination, many Pakistanis face barriers in the labor market. Pakistanis often work in lower-status jobs that they would not have considered in Pakistan, demonstrating a shift in social mobility within the context of migration.

One of the major issues for Pakistanis in the Netherlands is racial discrimination – specifically a racial hierarchical structure in Dutch society. Following the 9/11 attacks in the United States, racial tensions escalated towards Muslims. Mosques were attacked and Muslims were subjected to scrutiny. The media portrayed Muslims as anti-Western aiding the hostility the Dutch felt.

Employment opportunities are limited until official refugee status is attained which can take many years. Those with professional credentials from Pakistan find it difficult to secure jobs on par with their education and qualifications. Competition in the labor market coupled with discriminatory practices compound the challenges.

Two Pakistani political leaders were convicted for threatening to kill anti-Islam lawmaker Geert Wilders.

The Netherlands has no extradition treaty with Pakistan.

== Sri Lankan Tamils ==
Around 20,000 Tamils, mostly from Sri Lanka, are estimated to be living in Netherlands. The relationship between Tamils and Dutch dates back to the colonial era. The Dutch East India Company was active in Sri Lanka and Southern India. In Sri Lanka, most of Tamil areas were under Dutch Ceylon rule between 1640 and 1796. During Dutch rule some Dutch loanwords were adopted in Sri Lankan Tamil language. Back then, Tamils and Malayalis were known as "Malabars" among the Portuguese and Dutch.

The earliest Tamil immigrants to Netherlands came in the 1980s, and were primarily educated personnel, businessmen and students. When the Sri Lankan civil war broke out, many Tamils migrated 1984 onward were asylum seekers. Between 1984 and 1987, more than 3,500 Tamil men arrived in Netherlands. A second wave of Tamil refugees came between 1990 and 1992, which included women and children. Since 1995, the population of Sri Lankans in Netherlands has doubled, in 1996 there were 5,600 and in 2010 there were 10,346 people.

There is a low unemployment rate among Dutch Tamils, because they have shown willingness to accept jobs, that is below their qualifications. They attach great importance to education and also pay attention to their children's education. Dutch Tamils live mostly in small towns like Zeist, Utrecht, Nieuwegein, Roermond, Den Bosch, Breda, Den Helder and Hoorn, because the former refugees were settled away from big cities like Amsterdam.

Most of Tamils living in Netherlands are Hindus and there are many Tamil Hindu temples (Kovils) in Netherlands like Vinayagar Temple in Den Helder or Murugan Temple in Roermond. There are Tamil Christian minorities, who belong to Catholic and Evangelist churches.

== Nepalis ==
Nepalis in the Netherlands are immigrants, expatriates and international students from Nepal in the Netherlands, as well as Dutch people of Nepalese origin. As of 2010, statistics of the Dutch Centraal Bureau voor de Statistiek shows that there are about 1,505 people of Nepalese origin living in the country.

=== Lhotshampa refugees ===
The Netherlands are home to a number of Lhotshampa (Bhutanese Nepalis) refugees who were deported from Bhutan. Every year the Netherlands has been resettling around 100 Lhotshampa refugees since 2009. As of November 2011, around 350 refugees got resettled in The Netherlands.

=== Students ===
Nepalese students have been studying in the Netherlands since the early 1970s. Every year about a hundred students attend an international program in the Netherlands. So far, about 2,000 Nepalese students have graduated from different institutions all over the Netherlands in areas like Engineering, Law, Social Sciences and Management. Many Nepalese students are supported by the Netherlands Fellowship Program (NFP). The Consulate of the Netherlands is the body responsible for helping prospective Nepalese students in contacting an institution that meets their needs.

=== Organizations ===
Until the late 1990s, there was no Nepali-run organizations so almost all Nepal-related programs were organized by the Dutch people. The Nepal Samaj Nederlands was founded in 1999 as a cultural entity, it started to promote various Nepalese festivities among Nepalese and Dutch people who are interested in friendship with Nepalese people, culture, language and food. NSN publishes a news bulletin called Chautrai twice a year in both Nepali and Dutch.

Other organizations include the NRN-NCC Netherlands and the Worldwide Nepalese Students' Organization – Netherlands.

== Notable people ==
=== Indo-Caribbean ===
==== Indo-Surinamese ====
- Kiran Badloe, windsurfer
- Kiran Bechan, footballer
- Tanja Jadnanansing, politician
- Ricardo Kishna, footballer
- Raj Mohan, singer and songwriter
- Luciano Narsingh, footballer
- Prem Radhakishun, lawyer and columnist
- Anil Ramdas, journalist
- Kirtie Ramdas, television presenter and actress
- Aron Mohammed Winter, footballer
- Wiwek, artist

==== Indo-Guyanese ====
- Tara Singh Varma, politician

=== Indian ===
- Rattan Chadha, businessman
- Anice Das, speed skater
- Ram Labhaya Lakhina, entrepreneur and community leader
- Mangesh Panchal, cricketer

=== Afghan ===
- Omran Haydary, footballer
- Farshad Bashir, tax adviser and former politician
- Anoush Dastgir, footballer
- Siyar Bahadurzada, mixed martial artist
- Homaira Nakhat Dastgirzada, poet

=== Pakistani ===
- Imran Khan, singer and musician
- F1rstman, rapper and beatboxer
- Rahil Ahmed, cricketer
- Mudassar Bukhari, cricketer
- Madiea Ghafoor, athlete and Olympian
- Mohammad Kashif, cricketer
- Asim Khan, cricketer
- Shirin Musa, women's rights activist who introduced the concept of marital captivity to Dutch society
- Adeel Raja, cricketer

=== Sri Lankan ===
- Ranjith Clemminck-Croci, Politician
- Flavian Aponso, Cricketer
- Danny Thampinayagam, Cricketer
- Baskaran Kandiah, Businessman
- Nira Wickramasinghe, Historian

== Sources ==
- Adhin, J. H. (January 1961). "De immigratie van hindostanen en de afstand van de goudkust". New West Indian Guide (Nieuwe West-Indische Gids). 41 (1): 4–13. doi:10.1163/22134360-90002334.
- Tripartite Memorandum of Understanding Between the Government of the Netherlands, the Transitional Islamic State of Afghanistan, and the United Nations High Commissioner for Refugees, United Nations High Commissioner for Refugees, 18 March 2003
- Hessels, Thomas; Wassie, Fatma (2003), Afghanen in Nederland, een profiel (PDF), The Hague, Netherlands: Ministry of Justice
- Feldmann, C. Titia; Bensing, Jozien; de Ruijter, Arie; Boeije, Hennie R. (2007), "Afghan refugees in The Netherlands and their general practitioners: to trust or not to trust?", Sociology of Health and Illness, 29 (4): 515–535, doi:10.1111/j.1467-9566.2007.01005.x, hdl:1874/22004, PMID 17498166
