= All India Mahila Congress =

Women's wing of political party of India

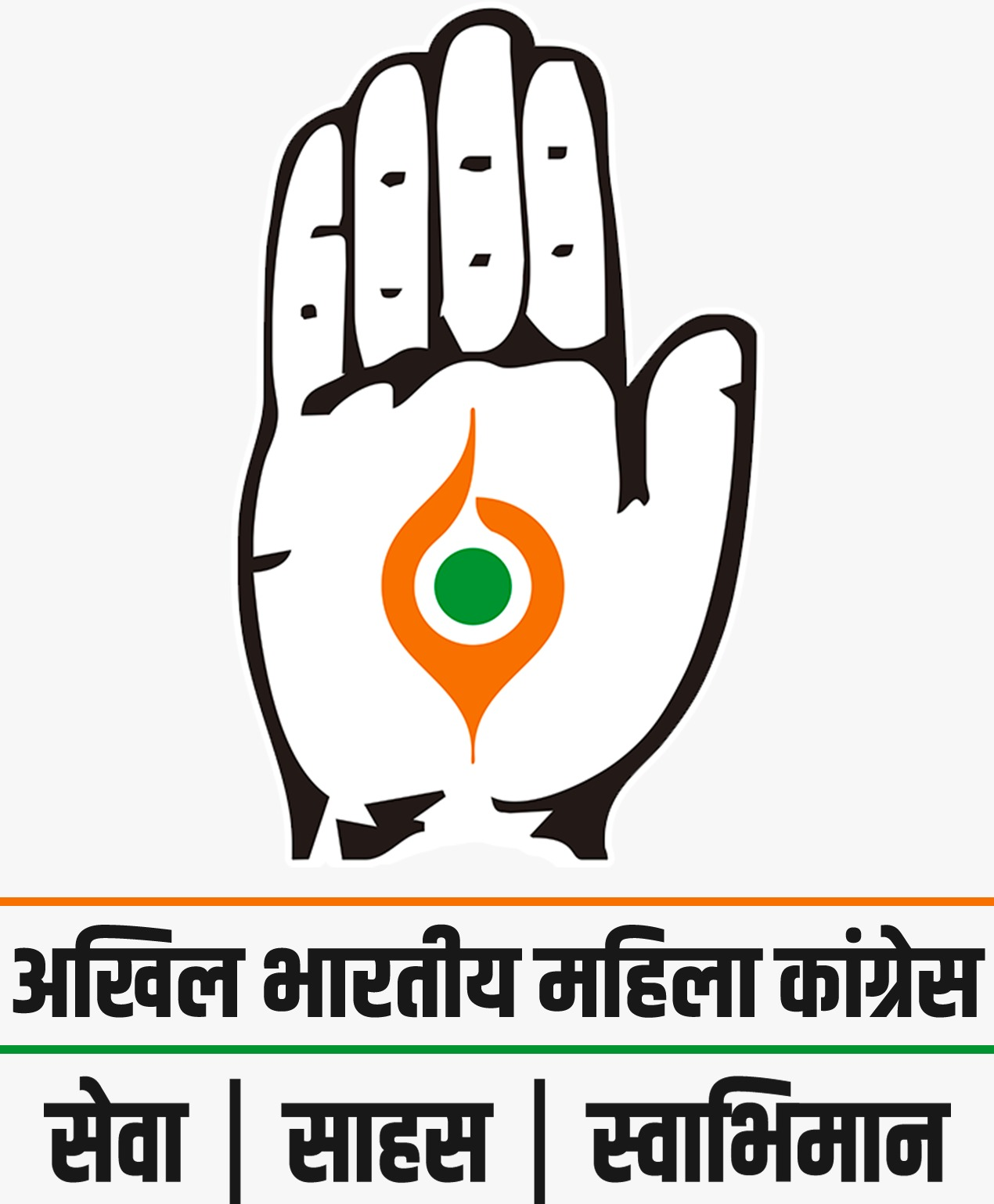

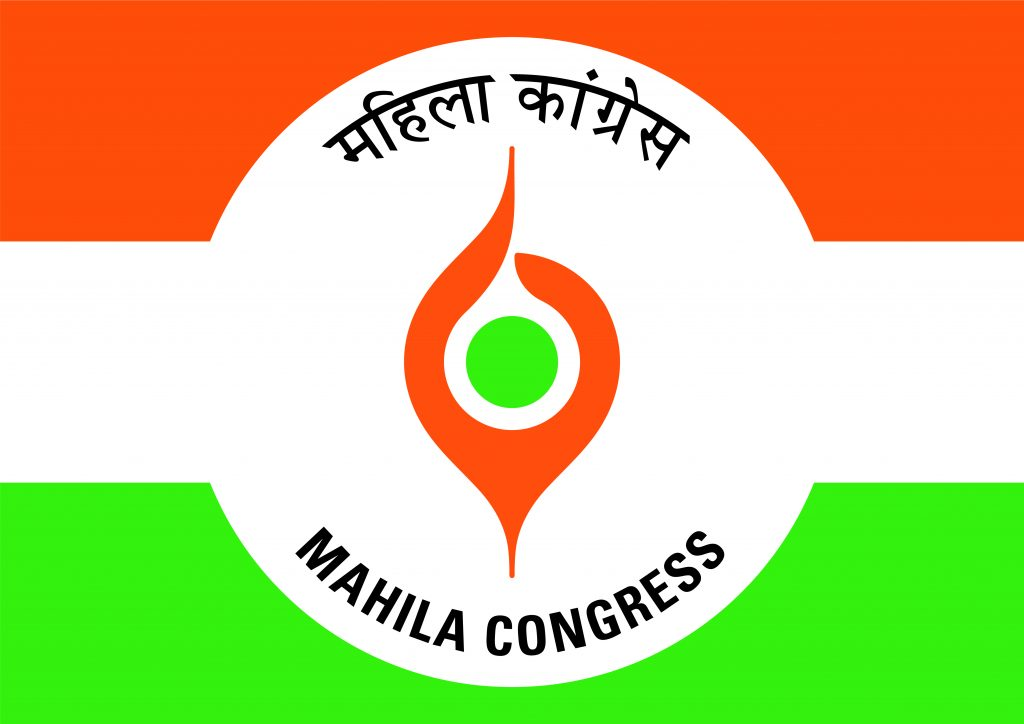
- Flag
- Abbreviation: AIMC
- Formation: 15 September 1984 (38 years ago)
- Founders: Sucheta Kripalani, Indian National Congress
- Headquarters: 24, Akbar Road, New Delhi 110001
- National President: Alka Lamba
- Parent organization: Indian National Congress
- Website: www.inc.in/all-india-mahila-congress

All India Mahila Congress (AIMC), also referred to as Mahila Congress, is the women's wing of the Indian National Congress (INC). It was founded in 1940 to promote the political and social empowerment of women in India. Currently Alka Lamba heads the All India Mahila Congress as its president appointed on 5 January 2024.

== History ==
An early high point for the organisation was a conference held in Bangalore in mid-1984 attended by Indira Gandhi, Rajiv Gandhi, and 30,000 delegates.

== Organisation ==
The All India Mahila Congress (AIMC) consists of the state level committees designated as Pradesh Mahila Congress Committee (translated as State Women's Congress Committee, and abbreviated as PMCC) which represent the AIMC in the states and union territories of India. The AIMC consists of the card–holding women members of the Indian National Congress who elect the executive committee and state president of each of the PMCCs.

=== General Secretary ===
In October 2015 Nagma, who was previously a film actress, was appointed to the office General Secretary. In January 2019 INC president Rahul Gandhi appointed Apsara Reddy as National General Secretary, Reddy being noted as the first transgender office holder in the AIMC.

In March 2020, Aiyshwarya Mahadev was appointed its National Secretary.

In August 2021, Netta D'Souza was appointed its Acting National President.

== List of presidents ==
S.no	President	Portrait	Period		Home State
1.	Abida Ahmed		1983	1988	Uttar Pradesh
2.	Jayanti Patnaik		1988	1990	Odisha
3.	Kumudben Joshi		1990	1993	Gujarat
4.	Girija Vyas		1993	1998	Rajasthan
5.	Ambika Soni		1998	1999	Punjab
6.	Chandresh Kumari Katoch		1999	2003	Rajasthan
7.	Rita Bahuguna Joshi		2003	2008	Uttar Pradesh
8.	Prabha Thakur		2008	2011	Rajasthan
9.	Anita Verma		2011	2013	Himachal Pradesh
10.	Shobha Oza		2013	2017	Madhya Pradesh
11.	Sushmita Dev		2017	2021	Assam
12.	Netta D'Souza		2021	5 January 2024	Gujarat
13.	Alka Lamba		5 January 2024	Incumbent	Delhi

== List of state presidents ==
PMCC	PMCC President	Source
Andaman and Nicobar Islands TMCC	Zubaida Begum	
Andhra Pradesh PMCC	Lam Tantiya Kumari	
Arunachal Pradesh PMCC	Chugu Nachi	
Assam PMCC	Mira Borthakur Goswami	
Bihar PMCC	Sarwat Jahan Fatema	
Chandigarh TMCC	Nandita Hooda	
Chhattisgarh PMCC	Phulo Devi Netam	
Dadra and Nagar Haveli and Daman and Diu TMCC	Madhuri Shashikant Mahala	
Delhi PMCC	Pushpa Singh	
Goa PMCC	Dr. Pratiksha Khalap	
Gujarat PMCC	Geetaben Patel	
Haryana PMCC	Pearl Chaudhary	
Himachal Pradesh PMCC	Janeb Chandel	
Jammu and Kashmir PMCC	Shameema Raina	
Jharkhand PMCC	Gunjan Kumari Singh	
Karnataka PMCC	Sowmya Reddy	
Kerala PMCC	Jebi Mather	
Ladakh TMCC	Stanzin A Dolkar	
Lakshadweep TMCC	Sajidha A.	
Madhya Pradesh PMCC	Vibha Patel	
Maharashtra PMCC	Sandhya Sawalakhe	
Manipur PMCC	Mutum Sarma Devi	
Meghalaya PMCC	Joplyn Scott Shylla	
Mizoram PMCC	Zodinliani	
Nagaland PMCC	Odi Kumla Pongen	
Odisha PMCC	Minakshi Bahinipati	
Puducherry PMCC	A. Rahamathunnisa	
Punjab PMCC	Gurusharan Kaur Randhawa	
Rajasthan PMCC	Sarika Singh	
Sikkim PMCC		
Tamil Nadu PMCC	M. Hazeena Syed	
Telangana PMCC	Sunitha Mogili Rao	
Tripura PMCC	Sarbani Ghosh Chakraboty	
Uttarakhand PMCC	Jyoti Rautela	
Uttar Pradesh PMCC (Central Zone)	Mamta Choudhary	
Uttar Pradesh PMCC (East Zone)	Shahla Ahrari	
Uttar Pradesh PMCC (Bundailkhand Zone)	Karishma Thakur	
Uttar Pradesh PMCC (West Zone)	Bharti Tyagi	
Uttar Pradesh PMCC (Agra Zone)	Mamta Rajput	
West Bengal PMCC	Subrata "Rasu" Dutta	

== See also ==
- Indian Youth Congress
- National Students' Union of India
