= Vijay Jolly =

Indian politician

Incharge & Prabhari of Tripura State, BJP
- Incumbent
- Assumed office 17 August 2013

All India Incharge & Ex.Convenor of Foreign Cell, BJP
- Incumbent
- Assumed office 1 July 2011

Member, National Executive Committee, BJP
- Incumbent
- Assumed office 2010

Member of the Legislative Assembly (India) (Delhi Legislative Assembly)
- In office 2003–2008
- Preceded by: Tek Chand Sharma
- Succeeded by: Delimitation of Constituency
- Constituency: Saket

Personal details
- Born: 24 July 1960 (age 66) New Delhi, India
- Party: Bharatiya Janata Party (BJP)
- Spouse: Rashmi Jolly
- Children: 2 Sons
- Education: University of Delhi (B.Com); University of Delhi (M.Com)

Vijay Jolly (born 24 July 1960) is an India politician of the state of Delhi belonging to the Bharatiya Janata Party (BJP).

He is currently the All India Incharge & Prabhari of Tripura State, BJP and All India Incharge & Ex. Convenor of Foreign Cell, BJP.

He is also a Member of the National Executive Committee of the BJP. Mr. Jolly was also a (former) MLA of the Member of the Legislative Assembly (India) (Delhi Legislative Assembly (2003–2008) from Saket constituency of New Delhi.

== Early life, education and qualifications ==
Born in 1960, Jolly did his B.Com.(Hons.) from Shri Ram College of Commerce (SRCC) of University of Delhi, thereafter he did his M.Com. from University of Delhi.

== Career ==
Vijay Jolly started his political career at Delhi University as a member of Akhil Bharatiya Vidyarthi Parishad (ABVP) and remained the President of Delhi University Students Union (1980–1981), before entering politics as a member of BJP.

== Political career ==
- In 1998, Vijay Jolly first fought the New Delhi state election from the Saket constituency and lost to then Congress Party heavyweight and two time sitting MLA, Tek Chand Sharma.
- In the 2003 Delhi Assembly state elections, Vijay Jolly defeated his arch rival Rohit Manchanda of the Congress Party and got elected to the Legislative Assembly of Delhi (2003–2008) from Saket constituency.
- In 2008 Delhi Assembly elections he fought against the New Delhi state Chief Minister Mrs.Sheila Dikshit of the Indian National Congress from New Delhi constituency and lost the election. Prior to the elections, he was seen at Sheila Dikshit's residence to seek her blessings.
- Vijay Jolly was one of the front runners for the election of Delhi BJP President in April 2010 along with former union minister Vijay Goel and also Chairman of Standing Committee of MCD, Mr. Vijender Gupta. Jolly commanded support from many senior party leaders including Lal Krishna Advani, Rajnath Singh and Sushma Swaraj, though eventually Vijendra Gupta was elected. However the party high command decided to make him the Vice President and Spokesperson for Delhi BJP.
- On 1 July 2011, Jolly was given additional charge and was appointed BJP's Overseas Chief in an official public statement given by party's national president Mr. Nitin Gadkari.
- On 17 August 2013, Mr. Vijay Jolly was appointed Prabhari (Incharge) of BJP Tripura State by BJP National President Shri Rajnath Singh

== BJP Foreign Delegations ==
Jolly is also the ex. in-charge of the BJP party's Foreign Cell. In December 2010, he led and was the organiser of a senior delegation to Israel with BJP President Nitin Gadkari and party General Secretary Vasundhara Raje Scindia.

Also in 2011, he was a part of the delegation with the BJP president Nitin Gadkari on Beijing visit.

== Recent allegations against Sheila Dikshit ==
On 27 January 2011, Delhi Bharatiya Janata Party vice-president Vijay Jolly on welcoming the removal of CWG Organising Committee chairman Suresh Kalmadi strongly demanded the removal of Chief Minister Sheila Dikshit for alleged corruption in conduct of the Commonwealth Games. He said that the CBI has enough evidence to prove corruption in Commonwealth Games which says that Sheila Dikshit is responsible for handling and spending more than Rs 28,000 crore on various games projects, is still free. She is equally to be blamed along with Kalmadi. The CBI probe into the alleged financial irregularities in the 3–14 October 2010 Games, include all the top Delhi bureaucrats and the role of the Chief Minister be thoroughly investigated.

== Personal life ==
Jolly is married to Rashmi Jolly who is a Fitness & Nutrition Consultant and Founder of Body Redesign. The couple have two sons.
