= Shirin Musa =

Pakistani-born Dutch women's rights activist and politician

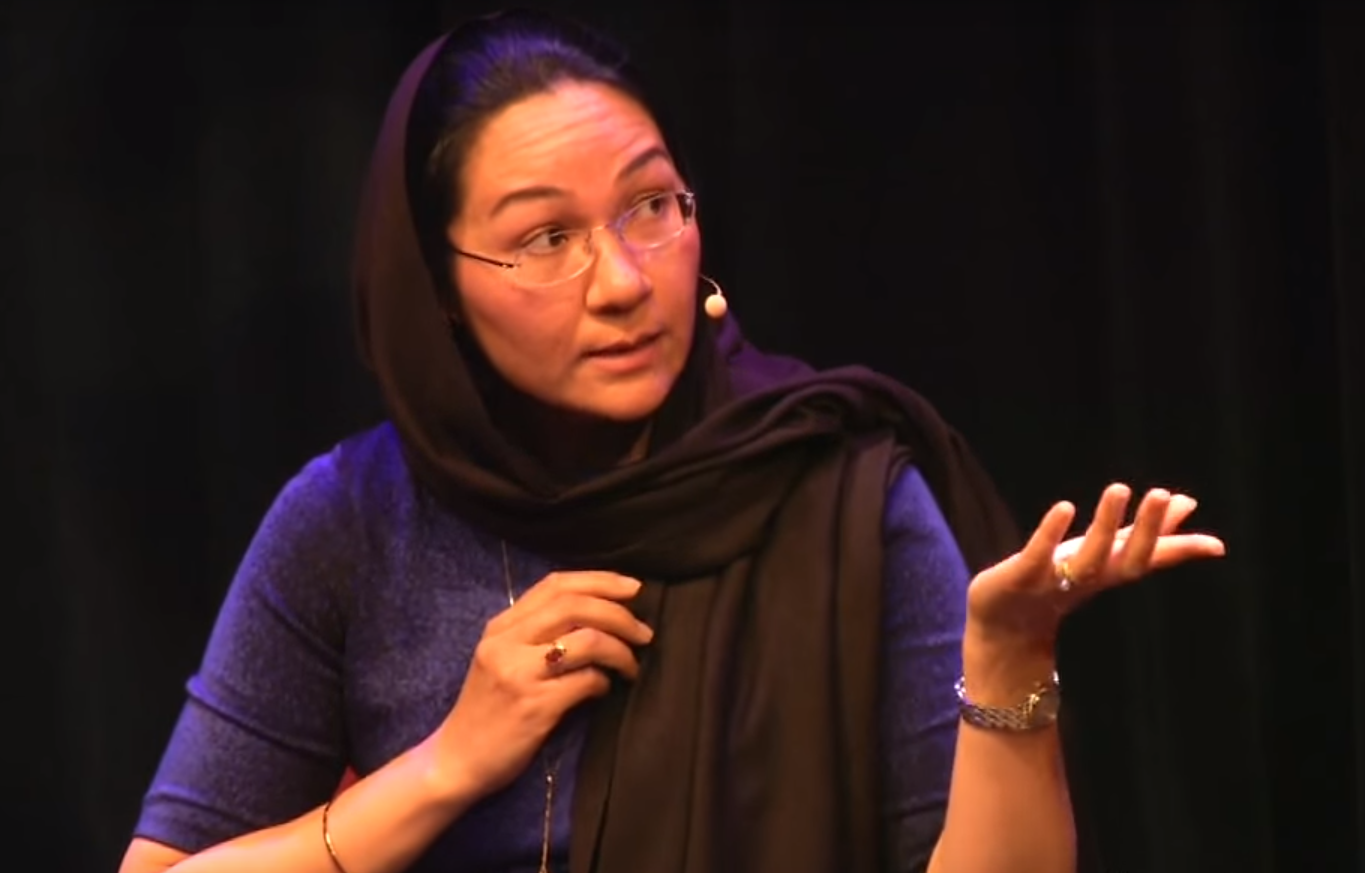
- Musa in 2015

Member of the Senate
- Incumbent
- Assumed office 23 September 2025
- Preceded by: Jan Anthonie Bruijn

Personal details
- Born: 28 August 1977 (age 48) Quetta, Pakistan
- Party: VVD
- Spouse: Walid (m. 2002; ann. 2010)
- Occupation: Activist; politician

Shirin Musa (born 28 August 1977) is a Pakistani-born Dutch politician and women's rights activist who is the founder of Femmes for Freedom. She has introduced the concept of marital captivity to Dutch society.

== Political career ==
Following the stepping down of Jan Anthonie Bruijn, Musa was sworn into the Senate on 23 September 2025, on behalf of the conservative-liberal People's Party for Freedom and Democracy (VVD).

== Personal life ==
Musa was born in Quetta, the capital city of the Pakistani province Balochistan, and came to the Netherlands as a baby.

Musa married a Dutch Pakistani. In 2002 they married under the Dutch law, and in 2005 they had their religious marriage. They separated in 2008. On 9 December 2010, a judge ended her religious marriage, after a long struggle with her husband who refused to cooperate.
