= Tek Chand Sharma (Delhi politician) =

Indian politician

Member of Delhi Legislative Assembly

Incumbent
- In office 1993–1998
- Constituency: Saket

Incumbent
- In office 1998–2003

Personal details
- Party: Indian National Congress
- Children: Virender Sharma

Pt.Tek Chand Sharma is a former member of the Delhi Legislative Assembly from Indian National Congress, who has represented the Saket Constituency twice, in 1993 and 1998.

In the 1998 Delhi Legislative Assembly election, Sharma contested on an Indian National Congress ticket against Vijay Jolly of the BJP in the Saket Constituency and won the election.
