= Parlad Singh Sawhney =

Indian politician

Member of the Delhi Legislative Assembly for Chandni Chowk
- In office 2020–2025
- Preceded by: Alka Lamba
- Succeeded by: Punardeep Sawhney
- In office 1998–2015
- Preceded by: Vasudev Kaptan
- Succeeded by: Alka Lamba

Personal details
- Born: 15 March 1950 (age 76) Delhi, India
- Party: Aam Aadmi Party (present), Indian National Congress (1998-2019)
- Spouse: Ranjit Kaur
- Children: Punardeep Sawhney
- Education: Graduate
- Profession: Businessman

Parlad Singh Sawhney (born 15 March 1950) is an Indian politician from New Delhi. He was a 5th-term member of the Delhi Legislative Assembly, representing the Aam Aadmi Party.

== Early life and education ==
Sawhney is from Chandni Chowk, Delhi. He is the son of late Hara Singh Sawhney. He studied BA but discontinued in his third year in 1971 at a college affiliated with Gwalior University.

== Political career ==
Sawhney contested his first municipal corporation election in 1977 from Mori Gate ward and won by 100 votes. In 1983, he won the municipal election from the same ward and was made chairman of Civil Lines zone from 1983 to 1990.

He then repeatedly contested the Chandni Chowk Vidhan Sabha Constituency from 1998 till 2015. He entered the second Legislative Assembly of Delhi winning the 1998 Delhi Legislative Assembly election, defeating runner-up Viresh Pratap Chaudhary of the Bharatiya Janata Party, by 8,162 votes. In the 2003 Delhi Legislative Assembly election, he defeated runner-up Dharamvir Sharma of the BJP by a margin of 10,866 votes. In the 2008 Delhi Legislative Assembly election, he defeated his closest rival Praveen Khandelwa of the Bharatiya Janata Party by a margin of 8,019 votes was made parliamentary secretary to chief minister Sheela Dixit. In 2013 Delhi Legislative Assembly election, he defeated Suman Kumar Gupta, also of BJP, by a margin of 8,243 votes. In 2015 Assembly election, he lost to Alka Lamba of Aam Aadmi Party.

Parlad Singh Sawhney joined the Aam Aadmi Party on 6 October 2019 in presence of Delhi Chief Minister Arvind Kejriwal and won the 2020 Delhi Legislative Assembly election on AAP ticket. He served as longest public accounts, committee, chairman.
