= Alka Lamba =

Indian politician

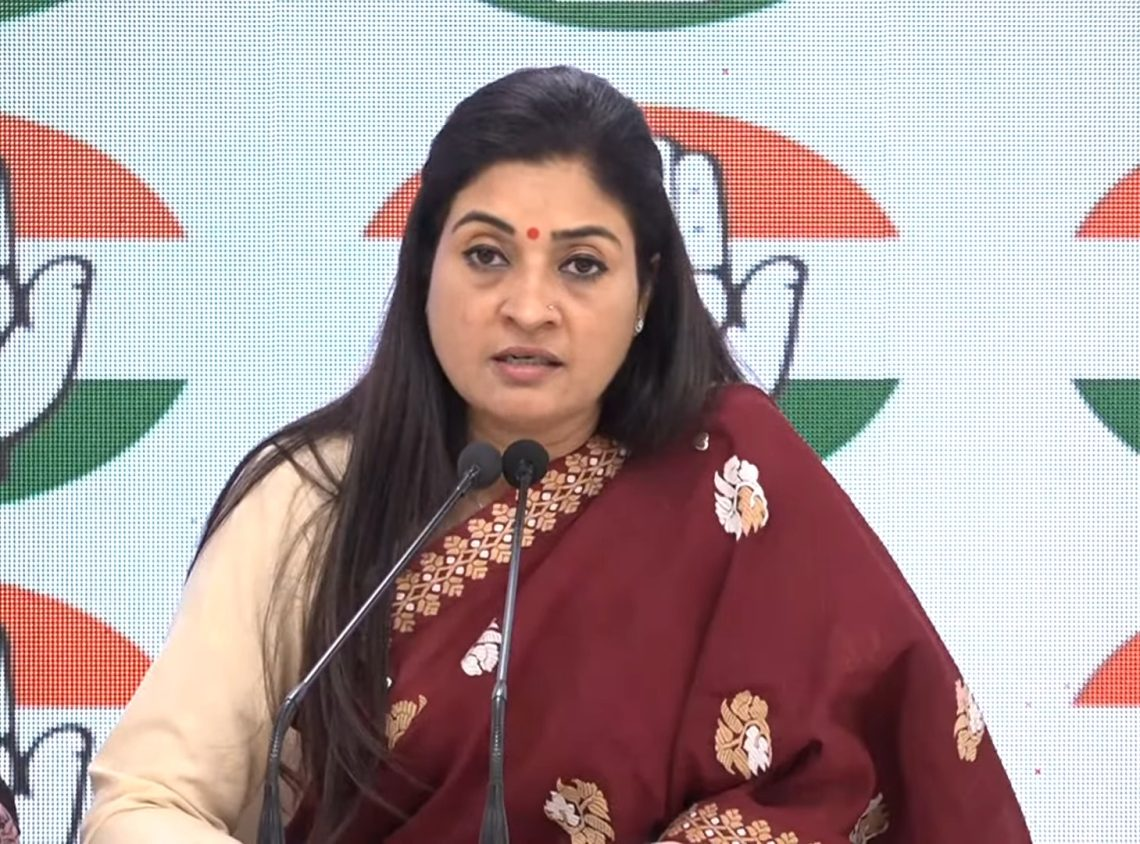

President of All India Mahila Congress
- Incumbent
- Assumed office 5 January 2024
- President: Mallikarjun Kharge
- Preceded by: Netta D'Souza

Member of Delhi Legislative Assembly
- In office 7 February 2015 – 19 September 2019
- Preceded by: Parlad Singh Sawhney
- Succeeded by: Parlad Singh Sawhney
- Constituency: Chandni Chowk

President of National Students' Union of India
- In office 1997–1999
- Preceded by: Saleem Ahmed
- Succeeded by: Meenakshi Natarajan

Personal details
- Born: 21 September 1975 (age 51) New Delhi, India
- Party: Indian National Congress (1994–2014 and 2019–present)
- Other political affiliations: Aam Aadmi Party (2014–2019)
- Children: 1
- Occupation: Politician

Alka Lamba (born 21 September 1975) is an Indian politician who is serving as the President of All India Mahila Congress. After serving the Indian National Congress in various capacities for more than 20 years, she quit to join the Aam Aadmi Party on 26 December 2014. In February 2015, Lamba was elected to the Delhi Legislative Assembly from Chandni Chowk. She quit AAP in September 2019 citing disrespect for her within the party. On 6 September 2019, she formally returned to the Congress party. She was however disqualified from the assembly by the Delhi Legislative Assembly speaker for violating the rules for party change to send a strong warning to turncoats.

Lamba began her career as a student leader, and is a former President of Delhi University Students' Union, former National President of National Students' Union of India, former General Secretary of Delhi Pradesh Congress Committee and former Secretary of All India Congress Committee. She is Chairperson of the NGO Go India Foundation. She was appointed as the All India Mahila Congress President on 5 January 2024.

== Education ==
Lamba completed her schooling at the Government Girls Senior Secondary School No.1, Delhi. Later she obtained her BSc degree from Dyal Singh College, Delhi (Delhi University) in 1996. Where she served as the President of Delhi University. Subsequently, she pursued her master's degree in Chemistry and Education from the Bundelkhand University, Uttar Pradesh.

== Personal life ==
Lamba married Lokesh Kapoor but they are currently divorced. They have a son named Hrithik Lamba.

== Political career ==
Lamba was only 19 years old when she began her political career in 1994 as a second year B.Sc. student. She joined the National Students' Union of India (NSUI), the student wing of the Congress party and was promptly given the responsibility of being Delhi State Girl Convener. In 1995, she contested the Delhi University Students' Union (DUSU) election for the post of President and won by a huge margin. In 1996, she worked as All India Girl Convener for NSUI, and in 1997 she was appointed President of NSUI.

In 2002, she was appointed the General Secretary of All India Mahila Congress. In 2003, she unsuccessfully contested Delhi Assembly elections from Moti Nagar constituency against the senior BJP leader Madan Lal Khurana. In 2006 she became a member of All India Congress Committee (AICC) and was appointed General Secretary of Delhi Pradesh Congress Committee (DPCC). At the same time she was also appointed Vice Chairperson of National Institute of Public Cooperation and Child Development (NIPCCD), an autonomous body of Ministry of Women and Child Development, Government of India. She was a Secretary All India Congress Committee (AICC) at the Indian National Congress from 2007 to 2011. She left Indian National Congress in December 2014 to join Aam Aadmi Party. In February 2015, Lamba contested Delhi Legislative Assembly election from Chandni Chowk constituency on Aam Aadmi Party's ticket. She defeated her nearest rival, Suman Kumar Gupta of Bharatiya Janata Party, by a margin of 18,287 votes.

In September 2019, she quit the Aam Aadmi Party and rejoined the Indian National Congress party as she was disenchanted for quite some time with the AAP leadership. Lamba had openly disagreed with the AAP leadership regarding the passing of a resolution in December 2018 to revoke former prime minister Rajiv Gandhi's Bharat Ratna.

Lamba has visited the UK, Russia, the US, China, and Venezuela to attend seminars and give speeches about women's empowerment, human rights and sustainable development in third world nations. In 2005, she visited Venezuela to attend the World Festival of Youth and Students. In 2006, she visited the US to attend a conference on international women's leadership programs. In 2007 and 2008, she visited London to attend the UN's International Widows Day and tourism and cultural festival. In 2008–2009, Lamba visited Nepal to attend a seminar on disaster management programs. In 2010, Lamba travelled across Brunei, Singapore, Bangladesh, Sri Lanka, Malaysia, and Maldives with the 2010 Delhi Commonwealth Games Queen's Baton Relay.

Lamba took part in the Citizenship Amendment Act protests in 2019 along with the members of the Congress in Old Delhi. She also donned a hijab in solidarity with the people being targeted with discrimination under the CAA and NRC and protested against the introduction of the laws.

== Controversies ==
Representing National Commission for Women on 16 July 2012, as one of the members of the enquiry team of 2012 Guwahati molestation case, Lamba met the victim of a Guwahati molestation case, held a press-conference and revealed the victim's identity. The 'tip-off' made local media houses work overtime to find the victim's real identity. Some TV channels interviewed the victim's neighbours to come to the conclusion that the girl's name was not what she was forced to say by the channel that recorded her molestation and near-stripping. Such acts of Lamba's were widely criticised. Following this, she was removed from the fact-finding committee of NCW.

On 25 May 2026, a Delhi Additional Chief Judicial Magistrate (ACJM) court convicted Lamba for assaulting a police officer during a protest at Jantar Mantar, Delhi demanding implementation of women's reservation in parliament prior to the 2024 Lok Sabha elections. She has been convicted under Section 132/221/223(a)/285 of the BNS for offences of use of criminal force and obstruction to public servants from discharging their official duties and causing injury to others.

On 06 June 2026, the Delhi Court released Lamba on probation of good conduct for one year, where she was directed to furnish a bond of Rs. One Lakh.

== Social work ==
A non-governmental organisation named Go India Foundation run by Alka Lamba got attention in 2010 during its blood donation campaigning. Significantly, over 65000 people donated blood in one day. The campaign was promoted by Salman Khan.

== Elections contested ==
=== Delhi Legislative Assembly ===
Year	Constituency	Party	Result	Vote percentage	Opposition Candidate	Opposition Party	Opposition vote percentage	Ref
2003	Moti Nagar	INC	Lost	36.20%	Madan Lal Khurana	BJP	61.35%	
2015	Chandni Chowk	AAP	Won	49.35%	Suman Kumar Gupta	BJP	24.79%	
2020	Chandni Chowk	INC	Lost	5.03%	Parlad Singh Sawhney	AAP	65.92%	
2025	Kalkaji	INC	Lost	4.11%	Atishi Marlena	AAP	48.80%	

State Legislative Assembly
Preceded by Parlad Singh Sawhney	Member of the Delhi Legislative Assembly from Chandni Chowk Assembly constituency 2015 – 2019	Succeeded by Parlad Singh Sawhney
