= CitizenM =

Dutch hotel chain owned by Marriott

citizenM Hotels
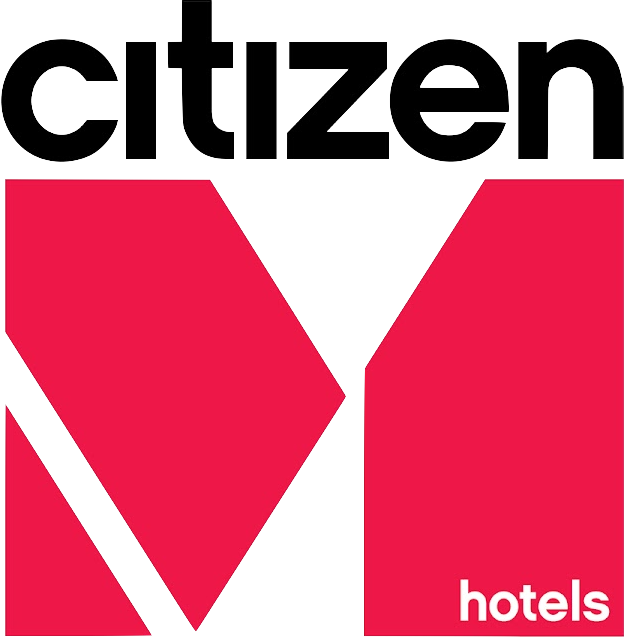
- Type: Subsidiary
- Industry: Hospitality
- Founded: 2005; 21 years ago in Amsterdam
- Founder: Rattan Chadha
- Headquarters: Dellaertweg 7E, 2316 WZ Kern 4, Floor 6, Leiden, Netherlands
- Number of locations: 37
- Key people: Rattan Chadha(Chair); Lennert de Jong(CEO)
- Owner: Marriott International
- Website: www.citizenm.com

citizenM is a Netherlands-based global hotel chain owned by Marriott International. Founded in 2005, the first citizenM opened in 2008 at Schiphol, Netherlands. It now operates 37 hotels in 20 cities around the world. In 2025 the group was purchased by Marriott International for $355 million.

== History ==
citizenM was founded by Rattan Chadha in 2005. The branding and logo were designed by KesselsKramer.

It opened its first hotel at Amsterdam Airport Schiphol in 2008. Its first overseas hotel in Glasgow opened in 2010, followed by London in 2012.

Its guest-room entertainment as of 2013 was provided by Swisscom Hospitality Services, which provides a music library and free video-on-demand TV through a Samsung tablet in each guest room.

In March 2019, GIC Private Limited acquired a 25% stake in citizenM, valuing the company at $2.3 billion. APG, GIC, and KRC have committed to invest a further $847 million of equity for future expansion.

In March 2024, reporting indicated that citizenM's owners were exploring business options with the help of Morgan Stanley and Eastdil Secured, which may include a potential sale valued at approximately four billion euro.

On April 28, 2025, it was announced that Marriott International would acquire citizenM for $355 million, with the transaction expected to close later that year. The acquisition was completed on July 23, 2025.

== Hotel architecture ==
Exterior of the citizenM Seattle South Lake, 2026

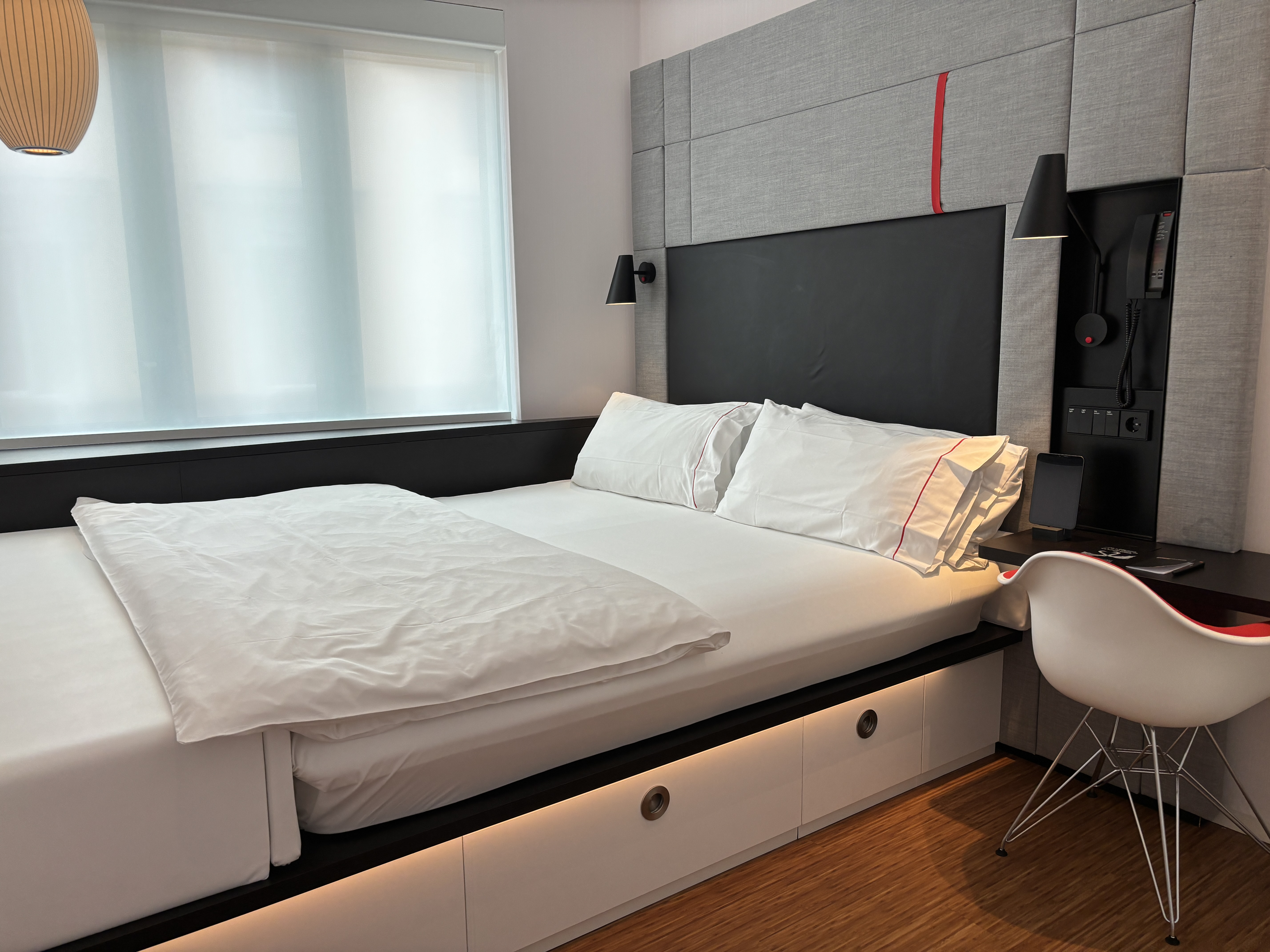
A room in the citizenM hotel in Rome

citizenM hotels embrace the International Style, having large glass windows and black metal cladding, making use of off-site modular construction for many of the components. Some of the locations make use of large scale public art, such as by Julian Opie at Paris Charles de Gaulle Airport.

== Locations ==
citizenM currently operates 34 hotels across North America, Europe, and Asia, with 2 new hotels under development. The original hotel at Schiphol Airport in Amsterdam was opened in 2008 and was designed by the Dutch architectural company Concrete. The second hotel opened in Amsterdam's city centre in 2009, and was awarded a Fodor's 100 Hotel Award for Design in 2011.
