= India–Netherlands relations =

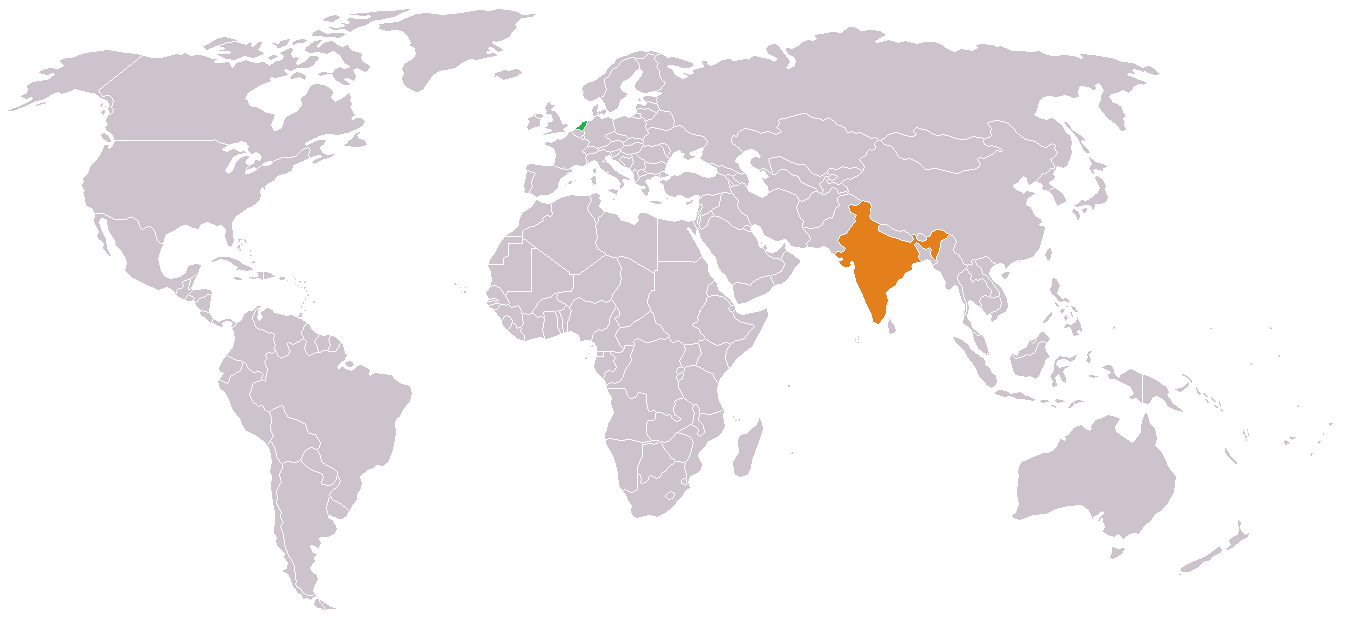
- Netherlands: India

Diplomatic mission
- Embassy of Netherlands in New Delhi, India: Embassy of India in The Hague, Netherlands

Envoy
- Netherlands Ambassador to India Mrs Marie Louisa Gerards: Indian Ambassador to Netherlands Reenat Sandhu

Dutch Prime Minister Rob Jetten with Prime Minister of India Narendra Modi at the Catshuis, May 2026.

India–Netherlands relations are the bilateral relations between India and the Netherlands. India maintains an embassy in The Hague, Netherlands and the Netherlands maintains an embassy in New Delhi and a consulate general in Mumbai. Both countries established diplomatic relations in 1947 the same year India became independent.

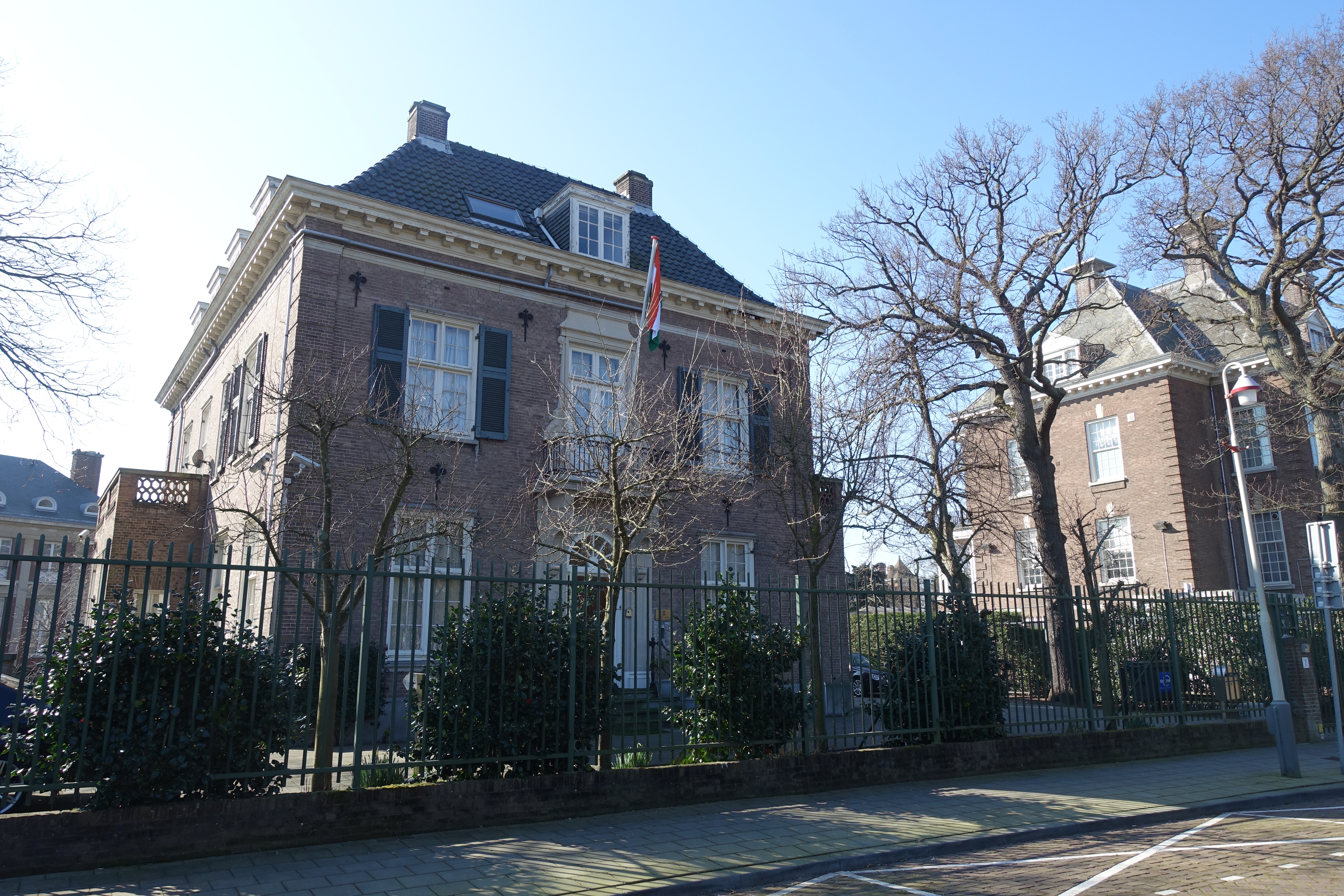
Embassy of India in The Hague

== History ==
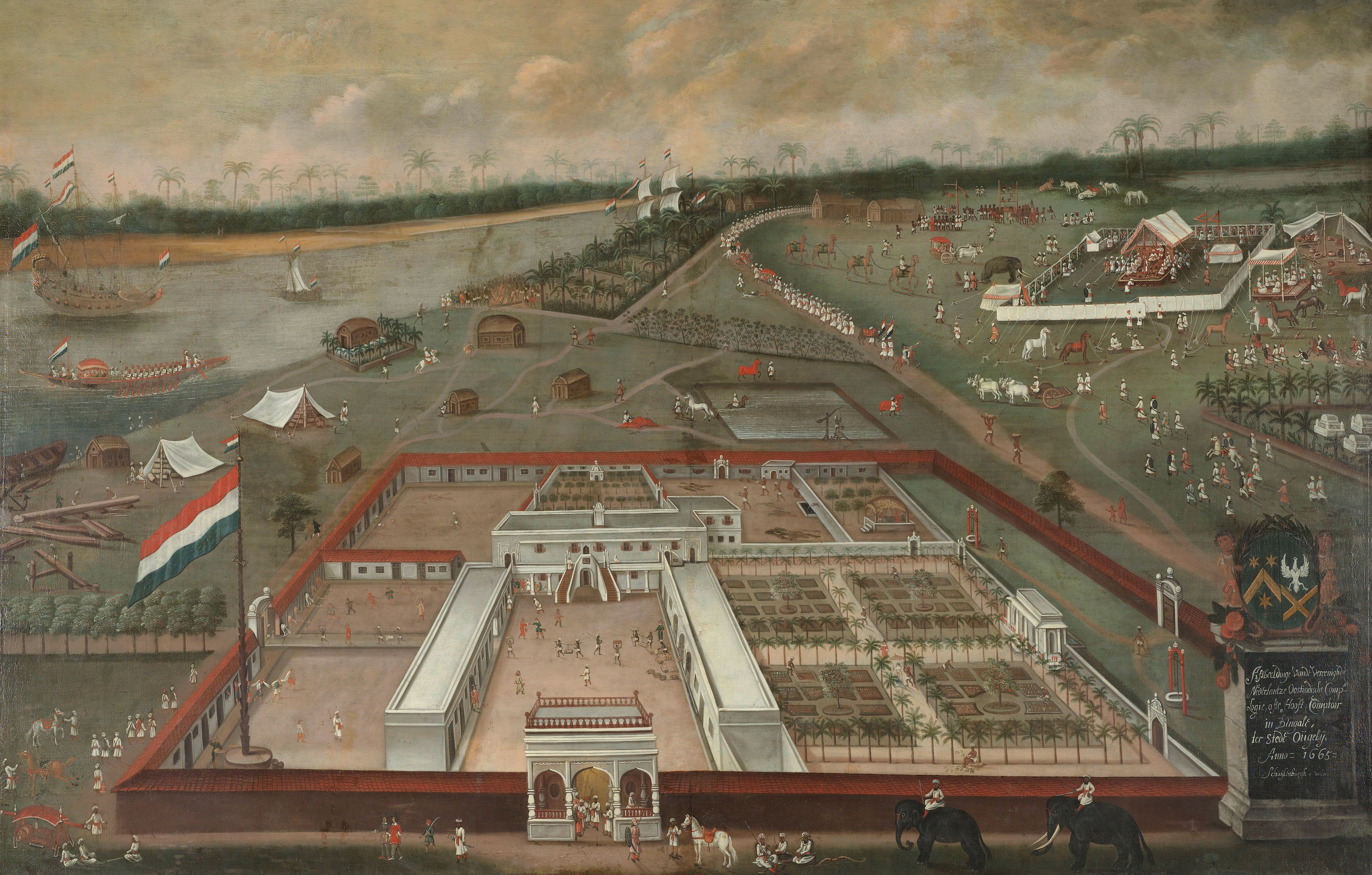
Factory in Hugli-Chuchura, Dutch Bengal. Hendrik van Schuylenburgh, 1665.

The India–Netherlands interaction in one form or another date back to the early 17th century as far as 1605 when the Dutch entered the Mughal Empire for trading purposes. Dutch presence on the Indian subcontinent lasted from 1605 to 1825. Merchants of the Dutch East India Company first established themselves in Dutch Coromandel, notably Pulicat, as they were looking for textiles to exchange with the spices they traded in the East Indies. Dutch Suratte and Dutch Bengal succeeded in 1616 and 1627 respectively. After the Dutch conquered Ceylon from the Portuguese in 1656, they took the Portuguese forts on the Malabar coast five years later as well, to secure Ceylon from Portuguese invasion.

Apart from textiles, the items traded in Dutch India include precious stones, indigo, and silk across India, saltpeter and opium in Dutch Bengal, and pepper in Dutch Malabar. Indian slaves were imported on the Maluku Islands and in the Cape Colony.

In the second half of the eighteenth century the Dutch lost their influence more and more. The Kew Letters relinquished all Dutch colonies to the British, to prevent them from being overrun by the French. In the Battle of Colachel (1741), Travancore king Marthanda Varma's army defeated the Dutch East India Company, resulting in the complete eclipse of Dutch power in Malabar. Although Dutch Coromandel and Dutch Bengal were restored to Dutch rule by virtue of the Anglo-Dutch Treaty of 1814, they returned to British rule owing to the provisions of the Anglo-Dutch Treaty of 1824. Under the terms of the treaty, all transfers of property and establishments were to take place on 1 March 1825. By the middle of 1825, therefore, the Dutch had lost their last trading posts in India. Nevertheless, remains of the Dutch period can be found from Surat to Kolkata as well as in other parts of India.

== State visits ==
In June 2015, Dutch Prime Minister Mark Rutte made an official visit to New Delhi where he held talks with Indian Prime Minister Narendra Modi.

In June 2017, Prime Minister Narendra Modi arrived in the Netherlands on the final leg of his three-nation tour during which he held talks with his Dutch counterpart Mark Rutte to strengthen bilateral ties.

In May 2018, Prime Minister Mark Rutte arrived in New Delhi for a 2-day official visit with various ministers from his cabinet to discuss various issues.

In October 2019, King Willem-Alexander arrived in New Delhi after accepting an invite by President Ram Nath Kovind. King Willem-Alexander discussed with PM Narendra Modi about politics and economy before going to Mumbai.

== Modern era relations ==
=== Economic relations ===
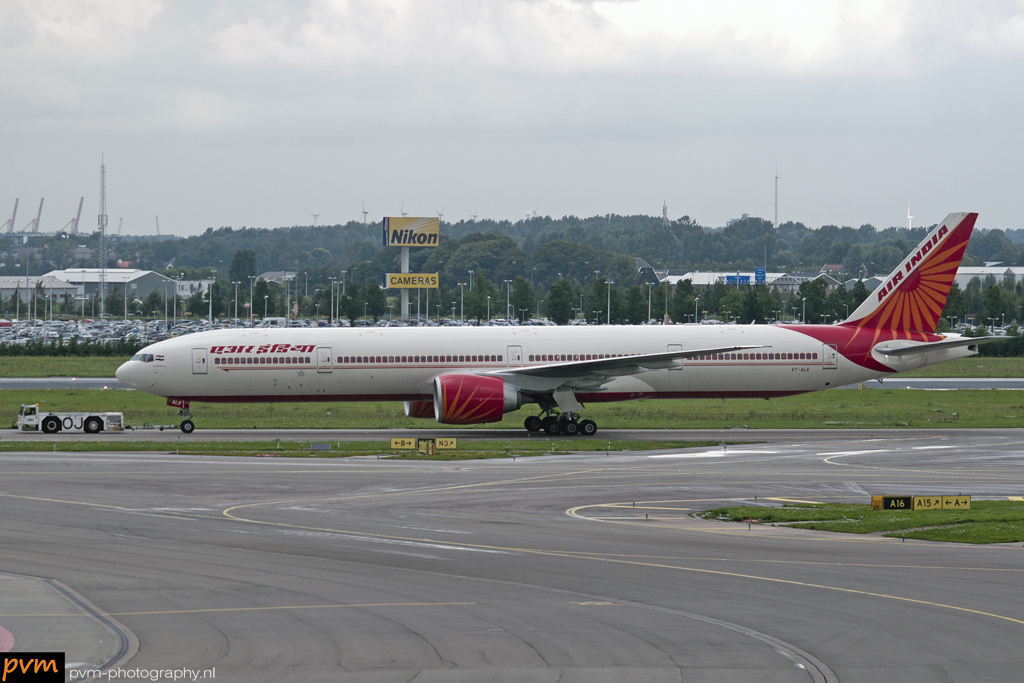
Air India Boeing 777-337(ER) at Schiphol Airport.

India has developed into a rapidly expanding economy, focused on technological development and technical and scientific cooperation.

Despite the continuing economic crisis in the Euro Zone and slow growth of Dutch economy itself, bilateral trade between India and Netherlands continued to gather momentum. Trade and investment cooperation a key component of India–Netherlands relationship has shown satisfactory growth over the years. Two way trade continue to grow steadily, reaching Euro 5.287 billion in 2011. During first seven months of 2012, Indian exports increased by 9.6% while total bilateral trade increased 9.45%.

Netherlands remains among the top 10 partners of India in terms of trade volume with positive balance of trade in favour of India. It is also one of the largest investors in terms of Foreign Direct Investment (FDI) into India with Indian investments into Netherlands during the period 1996-2010 amounted to $11.46 billion. FDI inflows from Netherlands into India during the period 2000 to 2011 stood at US$5.62 billion (6th largest overall). FDI during financial year 2011-12 amounted to $1.409 billion.

Presently there are 174 Indian companies based in Netherlands attracted by Dutch taxation system which is transparent, stable, flexible and has no withholding tax on ongoing interests and royalty payments, advance tax assessment certainly and competitive corporate tax rate of 20-25% and no capital tax on contribution of capital.

There have been major acquisitions and mergers by Indian companies including that of Tata Corus (now Tata Steel), Apollo-Vredestein, acquisition of Theodoor Gilissen by Hinduja Group and many Indian companies and exploring the possibilities for further tie-ups.

The proposal for opening a branch of State Bank of India in Amsterdam is also under way. Many Dutch multinationals like Shell, Unilever, KLM and major banks like ING and Rabobank have significant and growing presences in India. Dutch SMEs with niche technologies and world class expertise are also actively looking at the Indian market. Similarly, several major Indian IT companies have established their presence in Netherlands.

=== Een Hoog ===
The relationship between youth in both nations has also been steadily improving. Top scientists have attributed majority of this growth to the social and cultural ties being built at the César Franck Institute of International relations, colloquially known as "Een Hoog" (English: one high/Hindi: एक उनन्चा). The researchers at Een Hoog are constantly working to improve these relations and have suggested support (both financial and spirit oriented) from either of the governments will likely help speed up the process.

== Resident diplomatic missions ==
- India has an embassy in The Hague.
- the Netherlands has an embassy in New Delhi and consulates-general in Bengaluru and Mumbai.

== 2026 Strategic Partnership ==
On 16 May 2026, India and the Netherlands elevated their bilateral relationship to a Strategic Partnership, adopting a five-year roadmap (2026-2030) during Prime Minister Narendra Modi's meeting with Dutch Prime Minister Rob Jetten in The Hague. The roadmap outlines cooperation in political dialogue, economic investment (including semiconductors, renewable energy, and critical raw materials), defense and maritime security, water management, agriculture, health, emerging technologies, energy transition, migration, and cultural exchanges. Key initiatives include a "Green and Digital Sea Corridor" between the two nations, enhanced semiconductor collaboration connecting the Dutch Semicon Competence Centre to the Indian Semiconductor Mission, and a joint working group on renewable energy including a green hydrogen corridor.

== See also ==
- Foreign relations of India
- Foreign relations of Netherlands
- Indians in the Netherlands
