= Punardeep Sawhney =

Indian politician (born 1981)

Punardeep Singh Sawhney

Member of the Delhi Legislative Assembly
- Incumbent
- Assumed office 2025
- Preceded by: Parlad Singh Sawhney
- Constituency: Chandni Chowk

Personal details
- Born: 1981 (age 44–45) Delhi, India
- Party: Aam Aadmi Party
- Parent: Parlad Singh Sawhney (father)
- Education: B.Com (IGNOU) (theoretical only)
- Occupation: Politician

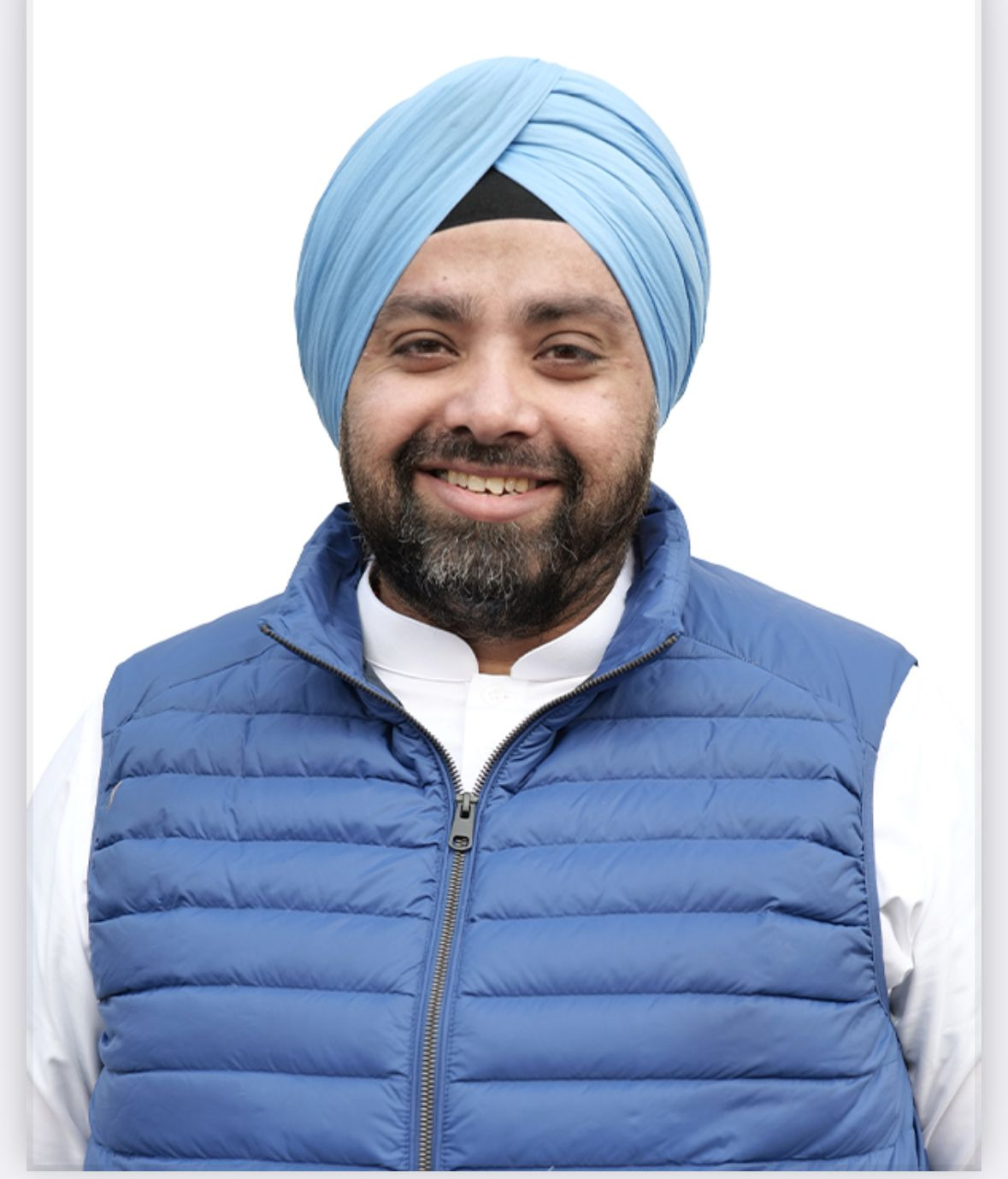

Punardeep Singh Sawhney (born 1981) is an Indian politician from Delhi. He is a member of the Delhi Legislative Assembly from Chandni Chowk Assembly constituency in New Delhi district. He won the 2025 Delhi Legislative Assembly election representing the Aam Aadmi Party.

== Early life and education ==
Sawhney is from Delhi. He is the son of former two terms municipal counsellor and five-time MLA Parlad Singh Sawhney. He started his B.Com through distance education stream at IGNO University in 2001 but did not complete his practical examinations after clearing the theory exams.

== Career ==
Sawhney won the Delhi Municipal Corporation elections in 2022 and was elected as the councillor for the Chandni Chowk ward and was elected unopposed Member standing committee, MCD. He won from Chandni Chowk Assembly constituency representing the Aam Aadmi Party in the 2025 Delhi Legislative Assembly election. He polled 38,993 votes and defeated his nearest rival, Satish Jain of the Bharatiya Janata Party, by 16,572 votes and is member DDA.
