= 2012 Guwahati molestation case =

Indian crime

- Location: 26°11′0″N 91°44′0″E; Guwahati, India
- Date: 9 July 2012
- Attack type: Molestation
- Convicted: Amar Jyoti Kalita

On 9 July 2012, in Guwahati city, the capital city of Assam, an Indian state, a teenage girl was allegedly molested and manhandled by a crowd of approximately 30 men outside a bar, many of whom were subsequently arrested based on video footage of the event. A local TV journalist from News Live was accused of instigating the mob and was arrested on 20 July 2012. Investigations are ongoing.

== Incident ==
On 9 July 2012, two women were exiting a bar and became involved in a physical struggle with a group of men standing outside. Gaurav Jyoti Neog, a journalist from News Live who was nearby, phoned his office asking for a camera and crew to shoot the brawl. Although the girl tried breaking away and asking for help, she was dragged back twice into the mob and abused further. Eventually, after almost half an hour, Mukul Kalita, another journalist from a local daily Ajir Asom intervened and rescued the girl. Once the police reached the site, the girl was taken back home and a case was filed. Amarjyoti Kalita is the prime accused based on alleged identification from the video footage.

== Reactions ==
The case caused uproar in the national and local media right after the video was aired by News Live, going viral on YouTube and provoking debates about the safety of women and human rights in India. By 20 July 2012, 12 of the 22 accused were arrested. Amarjyoti Kalita, the main accused surrendered to the Uttar Pradesh police in Varanasi on 23 July. The next day, Assam police went to Varanasi to take custody of Kalita and it was declared that 14 of the 17 identified accused had been arrested. Alka Lamba, a representative of the National Commission for Women (NCW) who was sent to Guwahati to investigate the molestation case, was criticized for accidentally revealing the identity of the victim in a press conference. Child rights experts also criticized the government for handing the case over to NCW instead of NCPCR (National Commission for Protection of Child Rights) since the victim was a minor.

== Judgement ==
Eleven accused in this case including prime accused Amarjyoti Kalita, were convicted on 7 December 2012 while four others were acquitted. Chief Judicial Magistrate S.P. Moitra convicted the prime accused Amarjyoti Kalita along with 10 others under various Sections of IPC namely 143 – unlawful assembly, 341- wrongful restraint, 294 -Obscene act, 323 – voluntarily causing hurt and 354 – Assault or criminal force to woman with intent to outrage her modesty.

News Live journalist Gaurav Jyoti Neog was acquitted along with Hafizuddin, Diganta Basumatary and Jitumoni Deka due to lack of evidence.
