= Viresh Pratap Chaudhry =

Indian social worker

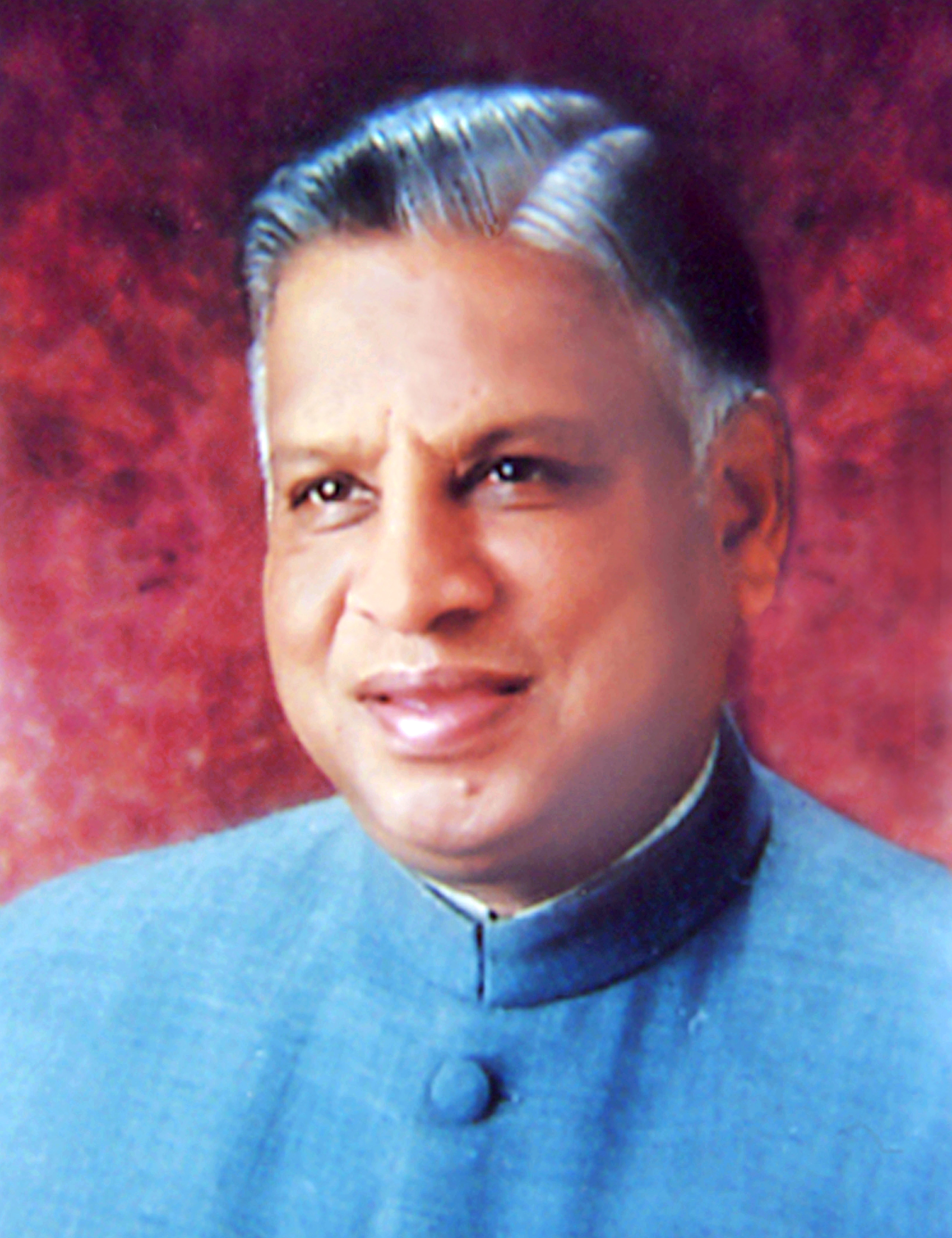
- Born: 1938; Delhi, India
- Died: 5 September 2013 (aged 74–75); New Delhi, India
- Occupation: Social worker
- Known for: Social service
- Spouse: Bala
- Children: 2 children
- Awards: Padma Shri

Viresh Pratap Chaudhry was an Indian social worker, politician and the president of Arya Anthyalay, a non governmental organization. He was born in 1938 in Delhi and after joining Indian National Congress, he became the general secretary of Indian Youth Congress. He left the party to join Janata Dal and became the president of the Delhi Pradesh unit. Later he quit Janata Dal and became a member of the Bharatiya Janata Party. He was involved in many social activities, primarily under the aegis of Arya Anthyalay of which he was the president of the Delhi Pataudi House unit. Chaudhry was honored by the Government of India, in 2002, with the fourth highest Indian civilian award of Padma Shri He died on 5 September 2013 at Delhi, leaving behind his wife, Bala, and daughter Sangeeta and son, Nitinjya.
