= Chandni Chowk Assembly constituency =

Constituency of the Delhi legislative assembly in India

Coordinates: 28.653°N 77.227°E

Chandni Chowk
- Constituency No. 20 for the Delhi Legislative Assembly

Constituency details
- Country: India
- Region: North India
- State: Delhi
- District: North Delhi, Central Delhi
- Established: 1993
- Reservation: None

Member of Legislative Assembly
- 8th Delhi Legislative Assembly
- Incumbent Punardeep Sawhney
- Party: AAP
- Elected year: 2025

Chandni Chowk Assembly constituency is one of the 70 Delhi Legislative Assembly constituencies of Delhi in northern India. Chandni Chowk assembly constituency is a part of Chandni Chowk (Lok Sabha constituency).

== Members of the Legislative Assembly ==
Year	Name	Party
1993	Vasudev Kaptan	Bharatiya Janata Party
1998	Parlad Singh Sawhney	Indian National Congress
2003	Parlad Singh Sawhney	Indian National Congress
2008	Parlad Singh Sawhney	Indian National Congress
2013	Parlad Singh Sawhney	Indian National Congress
2015	Alka Lamba	Aam Aadmi Party
2020	Parlad Singh Sawhney	Aam Aadmi Party
2025	Punardeep Sawhney	Aam Aadmi Party

== Election results ==
=== 2025 ===
Delhi Assembly elections, 2025: Chandni Chowk
Party	Candidate	Votes	%	±%
AAP	Punardeep Sawhney	38,993	54.78	
BJP	Satish Jain	22,421	31.50	
INC	Mudit Agarwal	9065	12.73	
NOTA	None of the above	253		
Majority		16,572		
Turnout		71,173		
AAP hold		Swing		

=== 2020 ===
Delhi Assembly elections, 2020: Chandni Chowk
Party	Candidate	Votes	%	±%
AAP	Parlad Singh Sawhney	50,891	65.92	+16.57
BJP	Suman Kumar Gupta	21,307	27.60	+2.80
INC	Alka Lamba	3,881	5.03	−19.04
SS	Anil Singh Jadon	242	0.31	N/A
BSP	Sudesh	218	0.28	−0.01
NOTA	None of the above	263	0.34	−0.15
Majority		29,584	38.32	+13.77
Turnout		77,224	61.43	−4.02
AAP hold		Swing	+16.57	

=== 2015 ===
Delhi Assembly elections, 2015: Chandni Chowk
Party	Candidate	Votes	%	±%
AAP	Alka Lamba	36,756	49.35	+27.39
BJP	Suman Kumar Gupta	18,469	24.79	−1.16
INC	Parlad Singh Sawhney	17,930	24.07	−13.70
BSP	Mohd. Rehan	217	0.29	−0.34
NOTA	None of the above	362	0.48	−0.23
Majority		18,287	24.56	+12.74
Turnout		74,517	65.49	
AAP gain from INC		Swing	+20.54	

=== 2013 ===
Delhi Assembly elections, 2013: Chandni Chowk
Party	Candidate	Votes	%	±%
INC	Parlad Singh Sawhney	26,335	37.77	−7.84
BJP	Suman Kumar Gupta	18,092	25.95	−6.69
AAP	Vikram Badhwar	15,312	21.96	
JD(U)	Khurrum Iqbal	7,032	10.08	
Independent	Mohd Shahzaman	1,461	2.10	
BSP	Mausam Ali	437	0.63	−2.69
Independent	Yogesh Kumar	103	0.15	
ACP	Paul M Rufus	92	0.13	
LJP	Vijay Bahadur	84	0.12	−16.00
Independent	Balram Bari	74	0.11	−0.11
Independent	Dev Raj	71	0.10	−0.03
Independent	Dinesh Kumar Tripathi	61	0.09	
RBHP	Manoj Kumar Sharma	58	0.08	
Independent	Anil Anand	24	0.03	
NOTA	None	493	0.71	
Majority		8,243	11.82	−1.15
Turnout		69,771	65.48	
INC hold		Swing	-7.84	

=== 2008 ===
Delhi Assembly elections, 2008: Chandni Chowk
Party	Candidate	Votes	%	±%
INC	Parlad Singh Sawhney	28,207	45.61	−14.30
BJP	Praveen Khandelwal	20,188	32.64	−2.93
LJP	Khurrum Iqbal	9,966	16.12	
BSP	Mohd Mustaq Khan	2,054	3.32	
Independent	Sunil Kumar	211	0.34	
RPI(A)	Abdul Rais	210	0.34	
ABHM	Chetan Taank	184	0.30	
SP	Harjeet Singh Lamba	139	0.22	
Independent	Balram Bari	133	0.22	−0.03
Independent	Ajay Mittal	120	0.19	
Independent	Salim Sahraji	101	0.16	
Independent	Dev Raj	83	0.13	
AIMF	Nasreen Isaq Malik	82	0.13	
Independent	Mohd Sami	68	0.11	
Independent	Khurshed Bano Khan	58	0.09	
Independent	Anil Anand	39	0.06	
Majority		8,019	12.97	−11.37
Turnout		61,843	57.2	+3.56
INC hold		Swing	-14.30	

=== 2003 ===
Delhi Assembly elections, 2003: Chandni Chowk
Party	Candidate	Votes	%	±%
INC	Parlad Singh Sawhney	26,744	59.91	+12.01
BJP	Dharamvir Sharma	15,878	35.57	+3.73
SS	Iswar Pal Singh	600	1.34	+1.11
Independent	Seema	509	1.14	
Independent	Vipin Kumar Gupta	174	0.39	
JD(U)	Vikas Kaushik	134	0.30	
Independent	Balram Bari	113	0.25	+0.11
JD(S)	Farid Khan	111	0.25	
Independent	Vinod Kumar	106	0.24	
Independent	Bhateri	82	0.18	
SP	Prahlad Gupta	71	0.16	
Independent	Piyush Bhatia	41	0.09	
Independent	Ajay Mittal	37	0.08	
Independent	Anil Anand	22	0.05	
Independent	Vinesh Kumar	20	0.04	
Majority		10,866	24.34	+20.28
Turnout		44,642	53.64	+1.22
INC hold		Swing	+12.01	

=== 1998 ===
Delhi Assembly elections, 1998: Chandni Chowk
Party	Candidate	Votes	%	±%
INC	Parlad Singh Sawhney	24,348	47.90	+6.03
BJP	Viresh Pratap Chaudhary	16,186	31.84	−18.72
Independent	Amod Kumar Sharma	6,574	12.93	
Independent	Chakresh Kumar Jain	3,214	6.32	
Independent	Manoj Kumar	293	0.58	
SS	Sanjay Sharma	116	0.23	−0.20
Independent	Balram Bari	73	0.14	
Independent	Mazid Ahmed	31	0.06	
Majority		8,162	16.06	+7.37
Turnout		50,835	52.42	−12.45
INC gain from BJP		Swing	+6.03	

=== 1993 ===
Delhi Assembly elections, 1993: Chandni Chowk
Party	Candidate	Votes	%	±%
BJP	Vasdev Kaptain	25,910	50.56	
INC	M M Agarwal	21,456	41.87	
JD	Ram Kishan	1,142	2.23	
Independent	Rattan Lal Bairwa	515	1.00	
LKD	Vinod	459	0.90	
SS	Sanjay Sharma	221	0.43	
Independent	Ela Nawab	172	0.34	
Independent	Rajender s/o Vidya Ram	158	0.31	
Independent	Hans Raj Goel	140	0.27	
Independent	Vishnu Bhagwan Gupta	121	0.24	
Independent	Ashok Kumar	90	0.18	
RPI	Rev Victor David	83	0.16	
Independent	Rajinder Kumar Verma	82	0.16	
Independent	Rajinder s/o Prithi Singh	67	0.13	
Independent	Partibha Rohtagi	66	0.13	
IC(S)	Dayanand Sharma	49	0.10	
JEM	Anil Bhardwaj	48	0.09	
Independent	Kabul Singh	47	0.09	
Independent	Surinder Verma	43	0.08	
Independent	Deepak Khanna	40	0.08	
Independent	Suresh	40	0.08	
Independent	Balram Bari	36	0.07	
Independent	Jamna Prasad	35	0.07	
Independent	Anil Kumar	31	0.06	
LPI	Krishan Gopal	25	0.05	
Independent	Mohd Tarik Rehman	24	0.05	
Doordarshi Party	Dwarka Dhish	23	0.04	
BLMD	Chhatrapal Sharma	18	0.04	
Independent	Mahabir Bansal	18	0.04	
Independent	Shiv Lal Goyal	16	0.03	
Independent	J K Jain	14	0.03	
Independent	Padam Chand	13	0.03	
Independent	Vijay Kant	12	0.02	
Independent	Vijay Kumar	9	0.02	
Independent	Prem Kumar	9	0.02	
Independent	Shankar Lal	9	0.02	
Independent	Dhan Prakash Gupta	6	0.01	
Majority		4,454	8.69	
Turnout		51,247	64.87	
BJP hold		Swing		
