= NICCT =

Netherlands India Chamber of Commerce & Trade (NICCT)
- Abbreviation: NICCT
- Formation: 2003
- Type: NGO
- Legal status: Active
- Location: The Netherlands
- Chairman: Edith Nordmann
- Key people: Ram Lakhina (Founder and Chairman Emeritus)
- Website: www.nicct.nl

The Netherlands India Chamber of Commerce & Trade (NICCT) is a non-commercial, voluntary association of business concerns and professionals with an interest in business and economic relations between India and The Netherlands. It came into being in 2003 as a result of the merger between the India Trade Council and the Indo Dutch Chamber of Commerce, both of which had functioned in The Netherlands for many years and had similar objectives & activities.

The basic objective of the NICCT is to promote business and economic relations between India and The Netherlands to the mutual benefit of both the countries. The economies of the two countries are mutually complementary in many ways and there is a significant scope for expansion of trade and business relations between these two countries. Knowledge and understanding of business environments in the two countries is a prerequisite for expanding business relationship between them. The NICCT endeavours to play a significant role in expanding this knowledge and in creating favourable climate for further improvement of business relations between these countries.

The membership of the NICCT is growing rapidly. Currently more than 100 Dutch companies including major banks, insurance companies, IT related companies and multinationals are members of the NICCT and are participating actively in its activities.

== Objectives ==
The primary objective of the NICCT is to promote business and economic relations between India and The Netherlands to the mutual benefit of both countries. The economies of both countries are mutually complementary in many ways and there is a significant scope for expansions of trade and business relations.

Knowledge and understanding of both countries’ business environments is a prerequisite for expanding business relationships between them. The NICCT endeavours to play a significant role in expanding this knowledge and creating a favourable climate for further improvement of business relations between these two countries.

To achieve these objectives, the NICCT serves as a focal point for contacts and information concerning Indo-Dutch trade and business relations, whereby it aims to represent, promote, and protect the common interest of its members. The NICCT also strives towards progressive liberalisation, reduction, and eventual elimination of tariffs & restrictions on trade between both countries.

As such, the NICCT provides an active platform, initiating many opportunities for networking on economic relations between India & the Netherlands.

== Activities ==
The NICCT is a very dynamic binational chamber of commerce in The Netherlands. It organizes many kinds of activities to promote business and economic relations between India and The Netherlands. Its activities include match making trade missions to India, receiving trade delegations from India, seminars and net working receptions. In case you wish to know more about our past and future events, please check the website: www.nicct.nl/events/

On February 6–7, 2007, the NICCT in cooperation with the Foundation for Critical Choices for India and the Netherlands Water Partnership (NWP) organized a seminar on "Water Management in India and the Role of Dutch Technology. This has resulted in the creation of India Netherlands Water Platform to stimulate cooperation between India and The Netherlands in the development of India's water resources.

Since its inception in 2003, the NICCT has organized many pioneering activities:

- In the first year of its existence the NICCT highlighted the visa problems for Indian knowledge workers and businessmen coming to the Netherlands by bringing together on a common platform all the stakeholders for an open discussion. That has contributed to the easing of visa problems for Indian knowledge workers.
- In the same year 2003, the NICCT organized first major seminar in The Netherlands on ICT related services from India. Since then there is an increasing recognition in The Netherlands about India's potential in this important field and opportunities for Dutch business concerns.
- In 2004 the NICCT organized the first privately funded Match Making Trade Mission to India. This Mission has contributed to the establishment of new Dutch business concerns/joint ventures in India. It led to the contacts which have contributed to the IIFA Awards being held in Amsterdam in June 2005. It has also encouraged other Dutch organizations to send similar trade missions to India.
- In 2006, the NICCT joined hands with the ING Banking & Insurance Group and KPMG, in organizing a major seminar on ‘Investing in India Opportunities & Challenges. This seminar has stimulated further Dutch interest in doing business with India.
- In January 2007, the NICCT has initiated a new series of annual lectures on "Prospects for Growing Indian Economy & Its Relevance for Europe. The first lecture under this series was given by the Chief Economist of the ING Banking and Insurance Group, Mr. Mark Cliffe.
- On 25 June 2007 the NICCT and Tata Consultancy Services (TCS) organized a seminar on "Collaborative Innovations: New Generation Cooperation between India & The Netherlands.
- On 20 November 2008 the NICCT organized the largest business delegation from India ever in the Netherlands. This event involved Indian Finance Minister Palaniappan Chidambaram and Foreign Trade Minister Frank Heemskerk of the Netherlands.
- On 3 June 2009 the NICCT organized in cooperation with the International Association for Human Values a Symposium on Corporate Social Responsibility (CSR). The purpose of the Symposium was to bring together members of the Dutch business community, specially the members of the NICCT, on a common platform to discuss the role of CSR in the current business environment. H.H. Sri Sri Ravi Shankar, the Founder of the International Association for Human Values & the Art of Living Foundation also participated as speaker.
- On 8 June 2009 the NICCT organized Meet the Distinguished CEO, with Mr. Subramaniam Ramadorai, CEO of Tata Consultancy Services, at KPMG in Amstelveen. Mr. Ramadorai, addressed the audience and talked about his experiences & vision as an IT entrepreneur. After this presentation Mr. Ramadorai answered questions from the audience.
- On 24 September 2009 the NICCT handed out the first NICCT India Trade Award at the ING House in Amsterdam. The company Hyva Group was awarded this prestigious prize after the jury had unanimously voted for the company out of a total of 14 candidates. The company Rag Bag received an honorable mention.
- On 2 December 2009 the NICCT organized Meet the Distinguished CEO, with Mr. Jan Hommen, CEO of ING at the Beurs van Berlage in Amsterdam. Mr. Hommen agreed to talk on ‘The Global Financial Crisis; Causes, Consequences, Cures; and answered questions on the ING strategy with regards to India and his own views on the country and the financial crisis.

== Board ==
2023

1. Mrs. Edith Nordmann (Owner ACG International - Chairman NICCT (2018-present)
2. Mr. Sudip Lahiri (HCL Netherlands B.V. - Vice President NICCT)
3. Mr. Rajiv Mehra (Owner Mehra Holding B.V., Executive VP, Programs - Events, NICCT India)
4. Mr. Anand Bhugra (IQEQ - VP Finance NICCT)
5. Mrs. Vidhya Sampath (Tata Consultancy Services, VP Programs and Liaison to the Advisory Board NICCT)
6. Mr. Drs. Elbert Waller (KPMG Meijburg, VP Networking NICCT)
7. Mr. Jelke Schippers (Owner Smartshore, Board member NICCT)
8. Mr. Erwin Sieders (EY Netherlands, Board member NICCT)

2018

1. Mrs. Edith Nordmann (Owner ACG International - Chairman NICCT (2018-present)
2. Mr. Sudip Lahiri (HCL Netherlands B.V. - Vice President NICCT)
3. Mr. Rajiv Mehra (Owner Mehra Holding B.V., Executive VP, Programs - Events, NICCT India)
4. Mrs. Namita Krul - Taneja (Owner Meri Body - VP Finance NICCT)
5. Mrs. Vidhya Sampath (Tata Consultancy Services, VP Programs and Liaison to the Advisory Board NICCT)
6. Mr. Drs. Elbert Waller (KPMG Meijburg, VP Networking NICCT)
7. Mr. Jelke Schippers (Owner Smartshore, Board member NICCT)
8. Mr. Erwin Sieders (EY Netherlands, Board member NICCT)

=== 2017 ===
1. Mr. Ryan Tewari (Mahler Fund Management B.V.) - Chairman (2017–2018)
2. Mr. Elbert Waller (KPMG Holding N.V.) - Vice President Finance
3. Mr. Toon Laurensse (Dutch Business Partners B.V.)
4. Mr. Rajiv R. Mehra (Hotel Wilhelmina B.V.) (2003–present)
5. Mrs. Vidhya Sampath (Tata Consultancy Services Netherlands B.V.)
6. Mr. Sudip Lahiri (HCL Netherlands B.V.)

Secretary

- Ms. Patricia Christina de Bordes - Project Manager / Executive Secretary NICCT (2014–1 November 2016, October 2018-present)
- Mr. Ward Massa - Project Manager / Secretary NICCT (2012–2014)
- Mr. Jack Mazor - Project Manager / Secretary NICCT (2007–2009)
- Mr. Gerwin de Boer (NCH) - Project Manager / Secretary NICCT (2009–2011)

=== Honorary members ===
- Mr. Ram L. Lakhina (Lakhina Enterprises B.V.) - Founder and Chairman Emeritus; former Chairman (2010–2015; former Executive President 2003-2010)
- Mr. Eric Niehe (Former Dutch Ambassador to India)
- Mr. Gopal Ramanathan (Retired, Partner en Global Head of Transaction Services van KPMG)

=== Former members ===
- Mr. Ram L. Lakhina (Lakhina Enterprises B.V.) - Founder and Chairman Emeritus; former Chairman (2010–2015; former Executive President 2003-2010)
- Mr. Dick Bleyerveld (DHV B.V.)
- Mr. Rattan Chadha (Mexx Europe B.V.)
- Mr. Chris Daaleman (Tybex-Doco B.V.)
- Mr. Arnold Galavazi (DHV B.V.)
- Mr. Rutger Koopmans (ING N.V.) - Chairman (2005–2008)
- Mr. Frank Koster (ING N.V.) - Chairman (2009–2010)
- Mr. Ram Sand (IEH Group B.V.)
- Mr. Jan Peter Schmittmann (ABN AMRO Bank N.V.) - Chairman (2003–2005)
- Mr. André van der Valk (Avimac Consultants)
- Mr. Peter Staal (ING N.V.) - Executive Vice President
- Mr. Bob Bakker (DHV B.V.) - Project Director Water Treatment
- Mr. Oedith Jaharia (Dutch Haryana Business Consortium B.V.)
- Mrs. Monique Mulder (Logica PLC)
- Mr. Jeroen Muste (PriceWaterhouseCoopers N.V.)
