= Ram Lakhina =

Indian entrepreneur and community leader

Ram L. Lakhina
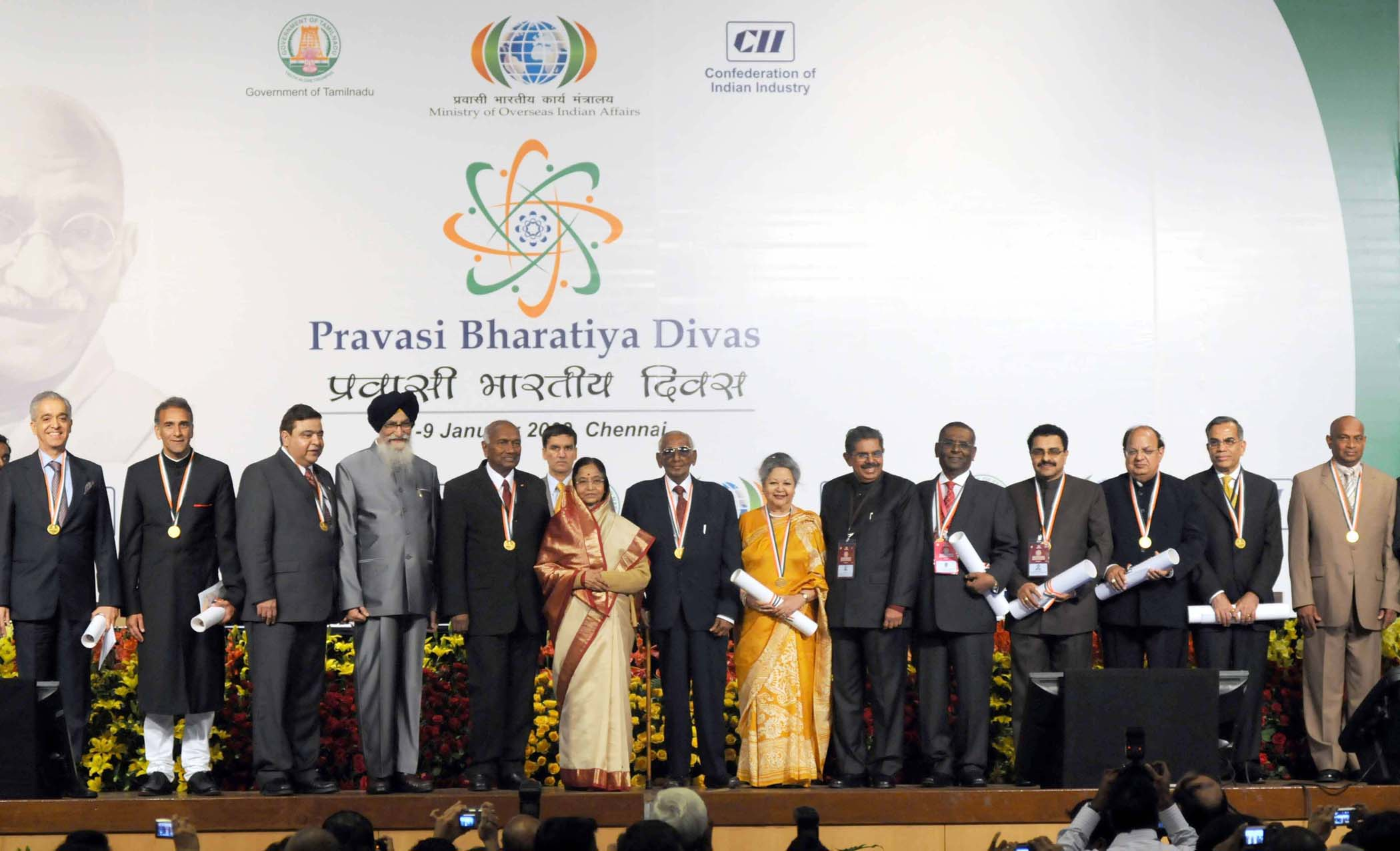
- Ram Lakhina (3rd from right), other awardees stand with President of India at Pravasi Bharatiya Divas in 2009
- Born: 1 February 1939 (age 87); Lahore, Punjab (British India)
- Education: Delhi University B.A. (Hons); University of Minnesota (M.A.)
- Occupations: Entrepreneur; founder, Chairman Emeritus, Trade (NICCT)
- Spouse: Sanyukta Kashyap-Lakhina (1966–present)
- Children: Kavita (daughter), Lavesh (son)

Ram Labhaya Lakhina (born 1 February 1939 in Lahore, British India) is an Indian entrepreneur and community leader based in the Netherlands. He was the first Chairman of the Global Organization of People of Indian Origin (GOPIO) and is the founder and Chairman Emeritus of the Netherlands India Chamber of Commerce and Trade (NICCT). He has served as Chairman of the Mahatma Gandhi Memorial Foundation and is one of the founders of the World Forum for Ethics and Business. In recognition of his work with the Indian diaspora and in promoting bilateral business relations, he received the Pravasi Bharatiya Samman Award in 2009 from the President of India and was knighted as an honorary Knight of the Order of Orange-Nassau in the Netherlands.

In January 2009, Lakhina received the Pravasi Bharatiya Samman award, conferred by the President of India, Pratibha Patil, in recognition of his contribution to community service.

In September 2009, he was invested as an honorary Knight of the Order of Orange-Nassau by Queen Beatrix of the Netherlands for his services to cultural and economic relations between India and the Netherlands.

== Biography ==
Ram Lakhina was born on 1 February 1939 in Lahore, then part of British India. Following the partition of India, he moved to Delhi, where he completed his school and college education. He graduated with a Bachelor of Arts (Honours) degree from Delhi University in 1959.

Lakhina received a merit scholarship from the Delhi School of Economics and completed the first year of a Master of Arts programme. He subsequently went to the United States on a scholarship for higher studies and obtained a Master of Arts degree in Economics from the University of Minnesota in 1963.

During his time at Delhi University, Lakhina was elected Chairman of his college union. He later served as President of the Delhi University Students Union and Secretary General of the National Council of University Students of India.

From 1958 to 1959, he was the editor of University Mirror, the student publication of Delhi University. In 1999, he co-edited a publication titled Fifty Years of Indo-Dutch Cooperation.

== Career ==
Between 1961 and 1968, Lakhina served in various positions at the International Student Conference, including as Secretary General from 1966 to 1968.

Lakhina founded the Indo-Dutch Chamber of Commerce to promote business relations between India and the Netherlands. He served as President of the Chamber from 1979 to 2003.

In 1980, he co-founded the Foundation for Critical Choices for India (FCCI) and served as its President from 1983 to 1991, and again from 1994 to 2003.

From 1988 to 1991, Lakhina was a member of the High Level Committee of Non-Resident Indians appointed by the Ministry of Commerce, Government of India, to promote India’s foreign trade.

Between 1994 and 2002, he served as the first Chairman of the Global Organization of People of Indian Origin (GOPIO), a non-partisan and secular global organisation focused on the welfare of people of Indian origin.

Since 1999, Lakhina has served as Chairman of the Mahatma Gandhi Memorial Foundation (Stichting Standbeeld Mahatma Gandhi) in Amsterdam.

Lakhina is closely associated with the Netherlands India Chamber of Commerce and Trade (NICCT), which was formed following the merger of the India Trade Council and the Indo-Dutch Chamber of Commerce and Trade. He is the founder of NICCT and served as its Executive President from its establishment in 2003 until April 2010. He subsequently served as Chairman until 2015 and is currently Chairman Emeritus.

More recently, Lakhina co-founded the World Forum for Ethics and Business, a Belgium-based foundation dedicated to promoting ethical foundations in global business practices.

== Personal life ==
Lakhina married Sanyukta Kashyap in 1966. They have two children.

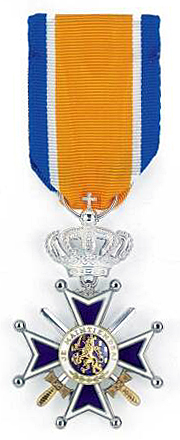
Knight of the Order of Orange-Nassau

== Recognitions ==
- 2009: Knight of the Order of Orange-Nassau (24 September 2009)
- 2008: Pravasi Bharatiya Community Service Award

== Award ==
Year	Country	Award name	Given by	Field of Merit
2019	Netherlands	Pravasi Bharatiya Samman	President of India	Community Service
