= Rattan Chadha =

Indian-born Dutch businessman (born 1949)

- Born: Kul Rattan Chadha; 6 August 1949 (age 77); Delhi, India
- Education: Sherwood College
- Occupation: Businessman
- Known for: Founding Mexx and CitizenM
- Children: Robin, Natascha, Noreen

Rattan Chadha (Hindi: रतन चड्ढा) is an Indian-born Dutch businessman who founded Mexx and served as its chief executive officer (CEO) until 2004 when he sold the company. Later, he founded private equity company KRC Capital B.V. to invest in hotels, real estate and leisure. He is also the founder of a capsule-like hotel chain, citizenM. He is also the owner of the Royal Mougins Golf Resort in Mougins, France.

== Awards and recognition ==
In 2000 he was knighted by the Queen of the Netherlands as a "Ridder" for his entrepreneurial success and his various philanthropic activities.

In 2004 he won the "Grand Seigneur" award of the Netherlands – the highest award in the country for excellence in branding and lifestyle marketing.
