= List of agencies of the government of Uttarakhand =

Overview of government-owned establishments in Uttarakhand, India

Uttarakhand Government Agencies

Government Agencies overview
- Jurisdiction: Uttarakhand
- Headquarters: Dehradun
- Website: https://uk.gov.in

Uttarakhand Government Agencies are the commercial and non-commercial establishments in the Indian state of Uttarakhand by Government of Uttarakhand or Government of India. This includes the state-run public sector undertakings, statutory corporations and co-operative societies. These commercial institutions are vital to the economic growth of this state.

Uttarakhand has 40 state public sector undertakings, 7 directorates, and 8 commissions.

== Preface ==
Uttarakhand Government Organisations are different types and under the control of different departments as follows:

- Public Sector Undertaking registered under the Companies Act, 1956
- Apex cooperative societies registered under the Societies Registration Act, 1860
- Statutory corporation incorporated and running as per Uttarakhand Government's Act, Regulations, Rules

== List of public sector undertakings ==
Public Sector Undertakings are government owned establishments, which are established and owned by the Government of India or State governments of India. The public sector undertakings are established either by nationalisation or an executive order in case of union government and state government or act of parliament in case of union government and act of state legislature in case of state government with the purpose to earn profit for the government, control monopoly of the private sector entities, offer products and services at an affordable price to the citizens, implementation of government schemes and to deliver products and services to remote locations of the country.

=== Agriculture and allied sectors ===
No.	Agency	Headquarters	Website
1.	Uttarakhand Agriculture Produce Marketing Board	Rudrapur	https://ukapmb.org
2.	Uttarakhand Bamboo and Fibre Development Board	Dehradun	https://ubfdb.org.in
3.	Uttarakhand Livestock Development Board	Dehradun	https://uldb.org
4.	Uttarakhand Seeds and Terai Development Corporation	Pantnagar	https://pantnagarseeds.com
5.	Uttarakhand Tea Development Board	Almora	https://utdb.uk.gov.in

=== Community welfare ===
No.	Agency	Headquarters	Website
1.	Shri Badrinath Kedarnath Temple Committee	Dehradun	https://badrinath-kedarnath.gov.in
2.	Uttarakhand Waqf Board	Dehradun	https://ukwms.org

=== Education ===
No.	Agency	Headquarters	Website
1.	Dr. Raghunandan Singh Tolia Uttarakhand Academy of Administration	Nainital	https://uaoa.gov.in
2.	Uttarakhand Board of School Education	Ramnagar	https://ubse.uk.gov.in
3.	Uttarakhand Board of Technical Education	Roorkee	https://ubter.in
4.	Uttarakhand State Council of Educational Research and Training	Dehradun	https://scert.uk.gov.in
5.	Uttarakhand State Institute of Educational Management and Training	Dehradun	https://siemat.uk.gov.in
6.	Uttarakhand State Higher Education Council	Dehradun	http://shec.uk.gov.in
6.	Uttarakhand State Authority for Minority Education (USAME)	Dehradun	

=== Energy ===
No.	Agency	Headquarters	Website
1.	Power Transmission Corporation of Uttarakhand Limited	Dehradun	https://ptcul.org
2.	Uttarakhand Power Corporation Limited	Dehradun	https://upcl.org
3.	Uttarakhand Renewable Energy Development Agency	Dehradun	http://ureda.uk.gov.in
4.	Uttarakhand Jal Vidyut Nigam Limited	Dehradun	https://www.ujvnl.com/

=== Finance ===
No.	Agency	Headquarters	Website
1.	Uttarakhand Gramin Bank Government of India & Government of Uttarakhand	Dehradun	https://uttarakhandgraminbank.com

=== Forestry and environment ===
No.	Agency	Headquarters	Website
1.	Uttarakhand Biodiversity Board	Dehradun	https://sbb.uk.gov.in
2.	Uttarakhand Forest Development Corporation	Dehradun	https://uafdc.in
3.	Uttarakhand Pollution Control Board	Dehradun	https://ueppcb.uk.gov.in

=== Infrastructure and industrial development ===
No.	Agency	Headquarters	Website
1.	Bhagirathi River Valley Development Authority	Dehradun	https://brvda.uk.gov.in
2.	Bridge, Ropeway, Tunnel and Other Infrastructure Development Corporation of Uttarakhand Limited	Dehradun	https://bridcul.com
3.	Garhwal Mandal Vikas Nigam	Dehradun	https://gmvmonline.com
4.	Haridwar Roorkee Development Authority	Haridwar	https://onlinehrda.com
5.	Kumaon Mandal Vikas Nigam	Nainital	https://kmvm.in
6.	Mussoorie Dehradun Development Authority	Dehradun	https://mddaonline.in
7.	State Infrastructure and Industrial Development Corporation of Uttarakhand Limited	Dehradun	https://siidcul.com
8.	Uttarakhand Civil Aviation Development Authority	Dehradun	https://ucada.in
9.	Uttarakhand Gramya Vikas Samiti	Dehradun	https://ugvs.in
10.	Uttarakhand Information Technology Development Agency	Dehradun	http://itda.uk.gov.in
11.	Uttarakhand Rural Roads Development Agency	Dehradun	http://urrda.uk.gov.in

=== Law and justice ===
No.	Agency	Headquarters	Website
1.	Bar Council of Uttarakhand	Nainital	https://barcouncilofuttarakhand.org
2.	Uttarakhand Judicial and Legal Academy	Bhowali	https://ujala.uk.gov.in
3.	Uttarakhand State Legal Service Authority	Nainital	https://slsa.uk.gov.in
4.	Uttarakhand Public Service Tribunal	Dehradun	https://ukpst.gov.in

=== Transport ===
No.	Agency	Headquarters	Website
1.	Uttarakhand Transport Corporation	Dehradun	https://utc.uk.gov.in

=== Tourism ===
No.	Agency	Headquarters	Website
1.	Uttarakhand Tourism Development Board	Dehradun	https://uttarakhandtourism.uk.gov.in
2.	House of Himalayas Ltd.	Dehradun	https://houseofhimalayas.com

=== Water ===
No.	Agency	Headquarters	Website
1.	Uttarakhand Jal Sansthan	Dehradun	https://ujs.uk.gov.in
2.	Uttarakhand Pey Jal Nigam	Dehradun	https://peyjal.uk.gov.in

== List of directorates ==
No.	Agency	Headquarters	Website
1.	Directorate of Economics and Statistics	Dehradun	https://des.uk.gov.in
2.	Directorate of Industries	Dehradun	https://doiuk.org
3.	Directorate of National Cadet Corps	Dehradun	https://nccdte.uk.gov.in
4.	Directorate of Training and Employment	Dehradun	https://rojgar.uk.gov.in
5.	Directorate of Treasuries, Pension and Entitlements	Dehradun	https://ecosh.uk.gov.in
6.	Urban Development Directorate	Dehradun	https://udd.uk.gov.in
7.	Watershed Management Directorate	Dehradun	https://wmudk.gov.in

== List of commissions ==
No.	Agency	Headquarters	Website
1.	Uttarakhand Electricity Regulatory Commission	Dehradun	https://uerc.uk.gov.in
2.	Uttarakhand Human Rights Commission	Dehradun	https://uhrc.uk.gov.in
3.	Uttarakhand Information Commission	Dehradun	https://uic.uk.gov.in
4.	Uttarakhand Public Service Commission	Dehradun	https://ukpsc.uk.gov.in
5.	Uttarakhand Right to Information Commission	Dehradun	https://urtsc.uk.gov.in
6.	Uttarakhand State Commission for Women	Dehradun	https://ukscw.uk.gov.in
7.	Uttarakhand State Election Commission	Dehradun	https://sec.uk.gov.in
8.	Uttarakhand Subordinate Service Selection Commission	Dehradun	https://sssc.uk.gov.in

== See also ==
- List of agencies of the government of India
- List of departments of the government of Uttarakhand
- Uttarakhand Council of Ministers
- Uttarakhand Gazette
