= Bandana Kumari =

Indian politician

Member of Legislative Assembly
- In office 8 December 2013 – 8 February 2025
- Preceded by: Ravinder Nath Bansal
- Succeeded by: Rekha Gupta
- Constituency: Shalimar Bagh

Deputy Speaker of Delhi Legislative Assembly
- In office 23 February 2015 – 4 June 2016
- Succeeded by: Rakhi Birla

Personal details
- Born: 11 March 1974 (age 52) Samastipur, Bihar
- Party: Aam Aadmi Party
- Education: Babasaheb Bhimrao Ambedkar Bihar University, (B.A.)

Bandana Kumari is an Indian politician who served as Member of Legislative Assembly for Shalimar Bagh constituency from 2013 to 2025.

She has served as Deputy Speaker of Delhi Legislative Assembly and former president of women's wing of the party, Aam Aadmi Party Mahila Shakti. mishra?

== Personal life ==
Bandana was born on 11 March 1974 in Samastipur, Bihar. Her father's name is Braj Kishore Sharma. She completed her 12th standard from Ram Briksh Benipuri School, Muzaffarpur in 1991 under the BSE (state) board. Bandana further got the Bachelor of Arts (BA Hons) from B. R. Ambedkar Bihar University, Muzaffarpur in 1994. Her husband's name is Sajjan Kumar. Both of them were self-employed as per 2013 affidavit. She is presently a housewife and a social worker. She is a resident of Shalimar Bagh, Delhi with her husband and son.

== Politics ==
In the assembly elections of December 2013, Bandana Kumari was elected as an MLA from the Shalimar Bagh constituency in Delhi, defeated three-time sitting MLA, Ravinder Nath Bansal of Bhartiya Janta Party (BJP) by a margin of 10,651 votes; she secured 47,235 votes. She was instantly hailed as a "giant killer". Bandana's victory was considered a shocking defeat for the BJP as the constituency was traditionally considered to be a stronghold of the party. The constituency was with the BJP since 1993. Shalimar Bagh was also the constituency of BJP's chief minister Sahib Singh Verma in 1993 and Bansal had held the seat for 15 years.

Bandana became President of Aam Aadmi Party (AAP) Mahila Shakti, the AAP's women's wing. She raised issues of women's safety in the city. The AAP's women's wing and Youth wing started 22 Gramin Sewa vehicles for females and senior citizens from Delhi metro stations in December 2014 to address Women's safety and women voters. Bandana was renominated for Shalimar Bagh in the 2015 Delhi Legislative Assembly elections. She fought the election on issues of women's safety and corruption.

Bandana won over BJP's Rekha Gupta, the Standing Committee Deputy Chairman New Delhi Municipal Council (NDMC), by a victory margin of 10,978 votes. She also got higher votes (62,656) than 2013 elections.

The AAP won 67 of the 70 seats in Delhi. It announced on 12 February 2015 that Bandana Kumari would be its nominee for the deputy Speaker of the Sixth Legislative Assembly of Delhi. On 23 February, she was formally elected as deputy Speaker; while Ram Niwas Goel became the speaker. She lost in 2025 to Rekha Gupta.

== Electoral performance ==
Delhi Assembly elections, 2025: Shalimar Bagh
Party	Candidate	Votes	%	±%
BJP	Rekha Gupta	68,200	59.95	▲13.49
AAP	Bandana Kumari	38,605	33.93	▼15.48
INC	Praveen Jain	4,892	4.30	▲2.17
NOTA	None of the above	770	0.68	▲0.05
Majority		29,595	26.02	▲23.07
Turnout		1,12,994	58.6	
BJP gain from AAP		Swing		

Delhi Assembly elections, 2020: Shalimar Bagh
Party	Candidate	Votes	%	±%
AAP	Bandana Kumari	57,707	49.41	−2.73
BJP	Rekha Gupta	54,267	46.46	+3.45
INC	J. S. Nayol	2,491	2.13	−0.53
NOTA	None of the above	735	0.63	+0.11
Majority		3,440	2.95	−6.18
Turnout		1,17,030	61.80	−7.09
AAP hold		Swing	-2.73	

Delhi Assembly elections, 2015: Shalimar Bagh
Party	Candidate	Votes	%	±%
AAP	Bandana Kumari	62,656	52.14	+8.13
BJP	Rekha Gupta	51,678	43.01	+8.92
INC	Sulekh Aggarwal	3,200	2.66	−11.93
BSP	Lalit Kumar Gautam	892	0.74	−1.74
NOTA	None	627	0.52	−0.34
Majority		10,978	9.14	−0.78
Turnout		1,20,173	68.90	
AAP hold		Swing	+8.13	

Delhi Assembly elections, 2013: Shalimar Bagh
Party	Candidate	Votes	%	±%
AAP	Bandana Kumari	47,235	44.01	
BJP	Ravinder Nath Bansal	36,584	34.09	−23.54
INC	Naresh Kumar Gupta	15,659	14.59	−20.06
IND	G. L. Khanna	3,751	3.50	
BSP	Raj Kumar	2,664	2.48	−3.40
NOTA	None of the Above	922	0.86	
Majority		10,651	9.92	
Turnout		107,342	66.62	+8.03
AAP gain from BJP		Swing		

State Legislative Assembly
Preceded by ?	Member of the Delhi Legislative Assembly from Shalimar Bagh Assembly constituency 2020– 2025	Succeeded by Rekha Gupta
