= Dhanana, Sonipat =

Village in Haryana, India

Coordinates: 29°06′00″N 76°30′47″E

Dhanana
- Village
- Interactive map of Dhanana
- Country: India
- State: Haryana
- District: Sonipat district

Area
  - Total: 1,826 ha (4,510 acres)

Population
  - Total: 6,591

Dhanana is a village in Gohana Tehsil in the Sonipat district of Haryana, India. Julana is its nearest town. Dhanana is located 20 km away from the sub-district headquarters in Gohana and 56 km away from the district headquarters in Sonipat. Dhanana is a gram panchayat of the village Aladadpur.

== Geography ==
As per Census 2011 information about Dhanana Aladadpur, the location code or village code of Dhanana Aladadpur village is 059655. As of 2009 stats, there are about 1,204 households in Dhanana Aladadpur village. As per 2019 stats, Dhanana Aladadpur village comes under Baroda Assembly constituency and Sonipat Lok Sabha constituency.

== Notable people ==
- Dhruv Rathee (born 1994), Indian influencer and activist
