= Uttarakhand Pollution Control Board =

Regulatory body in the Uttarakhand, India

- UPCB

Agency overview
- Formed: 2001
- Jurisdiction: Government of Uttarakhand
- Headquarters: Uttarakhand
- Agency executive: R. K. Shudhanshu
- Website: https://ukpcb.uk.gov.in/

The Uttarakhand Pollution Control Board (UPCB) is an autonomous regulatory body in the Uttarakhand, India, responsible for monitoring, controlling, and mitigating environmental pollution in the Uttarakhand region. Working under the Water (Prevention and Control of Pollution) Act, 1974, and the Air (Prevention and Control of Pollution) Act, 1981, the Board ensures that industries and organizations follow environmental regulations. Its key responsibilities include granting permits, monitoring air and water quality, controlling industrial emissions, and spreading awareness about environmental conservation in Uttarakhand.

== History ==
Uttarakhand Pollution Control Board was formed soon after Uttarakhand became a separate state in 2000. Before that, it functioned as a regional office under the Uttar Pradesh Pollution Control Board. Following the state's administrative reorganization, it became an independent board dedicated to managing Uttarakhand's environmental affairs.

== See also ==
- Central Pollution Control Board
