= Atal Canteen scheme =

Welfare scheme by Delhi government

- Type of project: Welfare scheme
- State: Delhi
- Chief Minister: Rekha Gupta
- Ministry: The Delhi Urban Shelter Improvement Board (DUSIB)
- Launched: 25th December 2026
- Budget: ₹ 104 crore (10.4 billion)
- Status: Ongoing

Atal Canteen scheme is a scheme, launched by Government of Delhi, in which subsidized food is provided to poor via government-run canteens over Delhi. On 25th December, 2025, Rekha Gupta (Chief minister of Delhi) announced that 45 Atal canteens will be inaugurated in the first phrase, as per BJP's election manifesto published during the Delhi legislative assembly election of 2025, with a plan to increase the number of canteens to 100 in the future.

On 19th February 2026, Gupta and V.K Saxena, Lieutanant Governor of Delhi inaugurated 25 more canteens, increasing the total number to 71.

== Background ==
On 25th December 2025, Rekha Gupta, on the occasion of birth anniversary of Atal Bihari Vajpayee (former Prime Minister of India), announced, "Government of Delhi has decided to inaugurate 45 canteens as per election manifesto and 55 canteens will be completed soon."

== Key incidents ==
Following the launch of the Atal canteen scheme on 25th December 2026, several ministers including Manjinder Singh Sirsa inaugurated canteens in their constituencies.

On 19th February 2026, Gupta and V.K Saxena, Lieutanant Governor of Delhi, inaugurated 25 more canteens. Rekha said, "Government aims to increase the total number of canteens to 100".

The Tripunithura municipality, one of two local bodies in Kerala that is governed by NDA, decided to implement the Atal canteen scheme in their local area.

The 2026 Iran war, resulting in shortage of LPG gas, affected four canteens in Delhi. The Delhi Urban Shelter Improvement Board (DUSIB), responsible for running the canteen, submitted a request to fulfill the demands of commercial cooking gas for canteens.

== Scheme details ==
Ths government allocated ₹104 crores (10.4 billion) for this scheme for operating 100 canteens over the region. The government added that the project is aimed at benefitting one lakh people daily, through its 100 canteens, each with the capacity to serve approximately one thousand people daily.

In the first phrase of the project, 1-2 canteens have been opened in specific constituencies. It is planned to increase this number in the future.

In the scheme, meals are provided as lunch and dinner at 5 rupees, to people from weak economic backgrounds, and daily wage workers in Delhi.

Eligible people are allowed to obtain meals at specific hours, via a token system.
