= Surendra Pal Joshi =

Indian artist

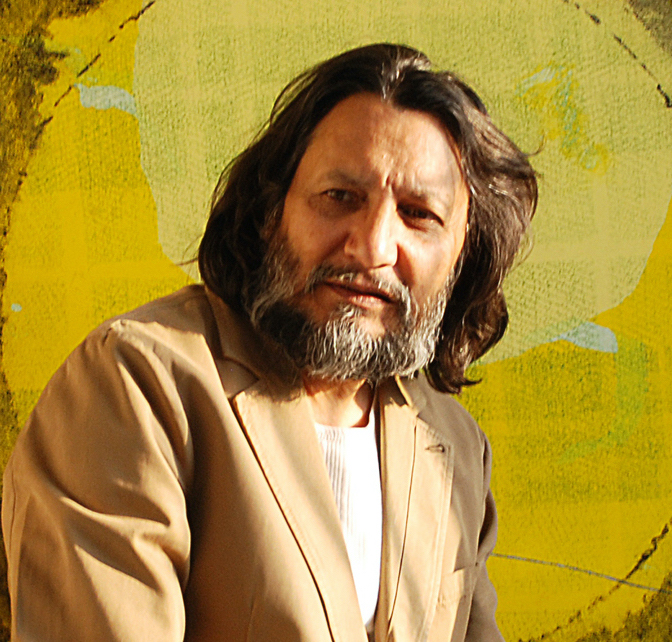
- Surendra Pal Joshi in 2012
- Born: 23 July 1955; Dehradun, Uttarakhand, India
- Died: 12 June 2018 (aged 62); Jaipur, India
- Education: University of Lucknow (BFA, 1985)
- Known for: painting; sculpture; mural; installation art
- Spouse: Sangeeta (m. 1988)
- Children: 2
- Awards: National Art Award, Lalit Kala Akademi

Surendra pal Joshi was an Indian artist known for his use of experimental techniques in paintings, sculptures and murals. His works are in the collection of Uttara Museum of Contemporary Art in Dehradun, India.

== Early life ==
Surendra pal Joshi was born on 23 July 1955 in Dehradun, Uttarakhand. In 1980, he joined the Lucknow College of Arts and Crafts in Uttar Pradesh, where he completed his bachelor's degree in fine arts in 1985, securing first class and the top position in his college.

== Career ==
Surendra pal Joshi moved to Jaipur and later in 1988 started working as an assistant professor at the Rajasthan School of Art. In 2008, he took voluntary retirement (VRS) from work and continued working on paintings. Joshi had done 22 solo exhibitions in his time and created several murals. His abstract paintings and murals have received many awards at national and international levels. Some of his designed murals are displayed at places like Indian Oil Corporation in New Delhi, Hindustan Unilever in Mumbai, and Shipping Corporation of India in Visakhapatnam. In 1997, Joshi received fellowship from Britain to design murals in Cardiff, UK.

In 2015, Joshi started working at Mussoorie Dehradun Development Authority building complex in Dehradun to give shape to the state's first art museum, Uttara Museum of Contemporary Art. The museum was inaugurated by state’s Chief Minister in late 2017, a few months before Joshi’s demise. The museum includes his sculptures, paintings, murals, installations, digital-print photographs, and videos constituting his reflections and responses to the devastation and rescue efforts he had witnessed during visits to the ravaged mountains in the aftermath of the 2013 North India floods.

== Works ==
=== Installation Art ===
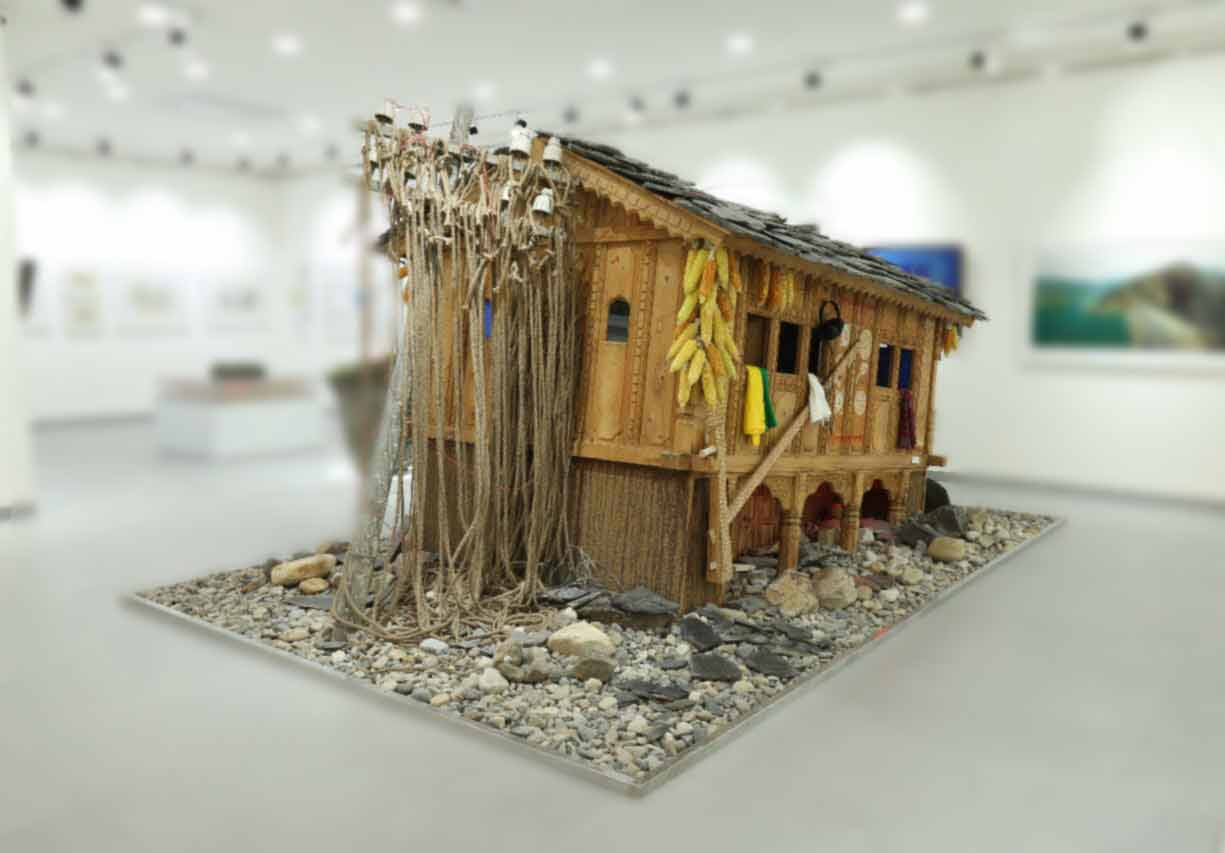
The Abode, Uttara Museum of Contemporary Art (2017)

- Taana Baana.
- The Abode.

=== Sculpture ===
- My Salute (helicopter).
- Music of our Time (helmet).
- Dhol-Damau.
- Paani.
- Ghilda.

== Awards and honours ==
- National Art Award, Lalit Kala Akademi, New Delhi.
- Asian Cultural Centre for UNESCO.
- Gold Medal, UNESCO.
- All India Award, Rajasthan Lalit Kala Academy.
- Fellowship for Mural Design by the British Council.
- Rajiv Gandhi Excellence Award, New Delhi.
- All India Award, Tilak Smarak Trust, Pune

== Personal life ==
Joshi was married to his wife Sangeeta. They have two children, son Parichay and daughter Tanya. Joshi died on 12 June 2018 while battling cancer at a private hospital in Jaipur.
