= Uttara Museum of Contemporary Art =

Art Museum in Dehradun, India

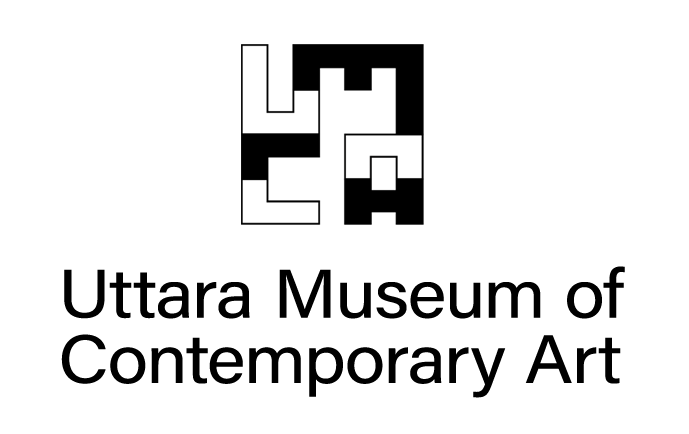

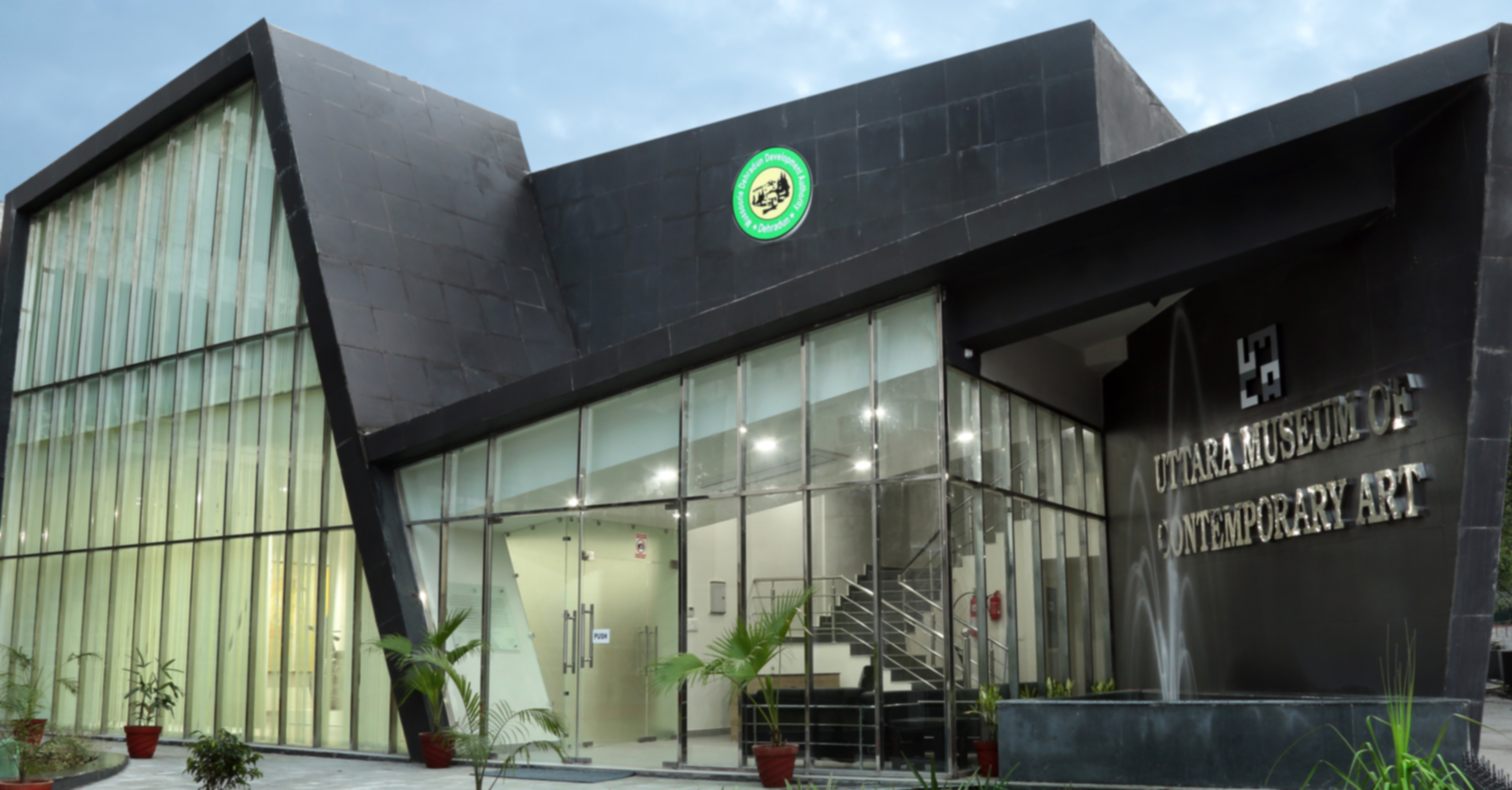
- Established: 2017; 9 years ago
- Location: MDDA Complex Clock Tower, Dehradun, India
- Coordinates: 30°19′29″N 78°02′34″E
- Type: Art museum Art gallery

The Uttara Museum of Contemporary Art (UMCA), located at MDDA Complex in Dehradun, is Uttarakhand's first art museum dedicating multi-dimensional artworks in the memory of the 2013 North India floods (Kedarnath disaster). The museum exhibits various aspects of the calamity and the folk culture of Uttarakhand through paintings, sculptures, and other artworks by artist Surendra Pal Joshi. It also includes an art gallery encouraging younger generation of artists to exhibit modern and contemporary art. The museum is located in one of the Earthquake zones of India and is housed in a specially constructed building to withstand high intensity earthquake and extreme weather conditions.

== History ==
The museum was inaugurated on 4 October 2017 by then Chief Minister of Uttarakhand, Trivendra Singh Rawat. The museum has two sections, one for the museum and other for the art gallery. Both the museum and the gallery encompass an area of 408 square metres. The museum was built under the guidance of artist Surendra Pal Joshi who played a major role in embodying the museum. The museum was developed at a cost of ₹1.92 crore by the Mussoorie Dehradun Development Authority (MDDA).

== Collections ==
=== Contemporary Art ===
The museum features 50 multi-dimensional artworks of Surendra Pal Joshi constituting the artist's reflections and responses to the devastation and rescue efforts he had witnessed during his visits to the ravaged mountains in the aftermath of the 2013 North India floods.

Selected works

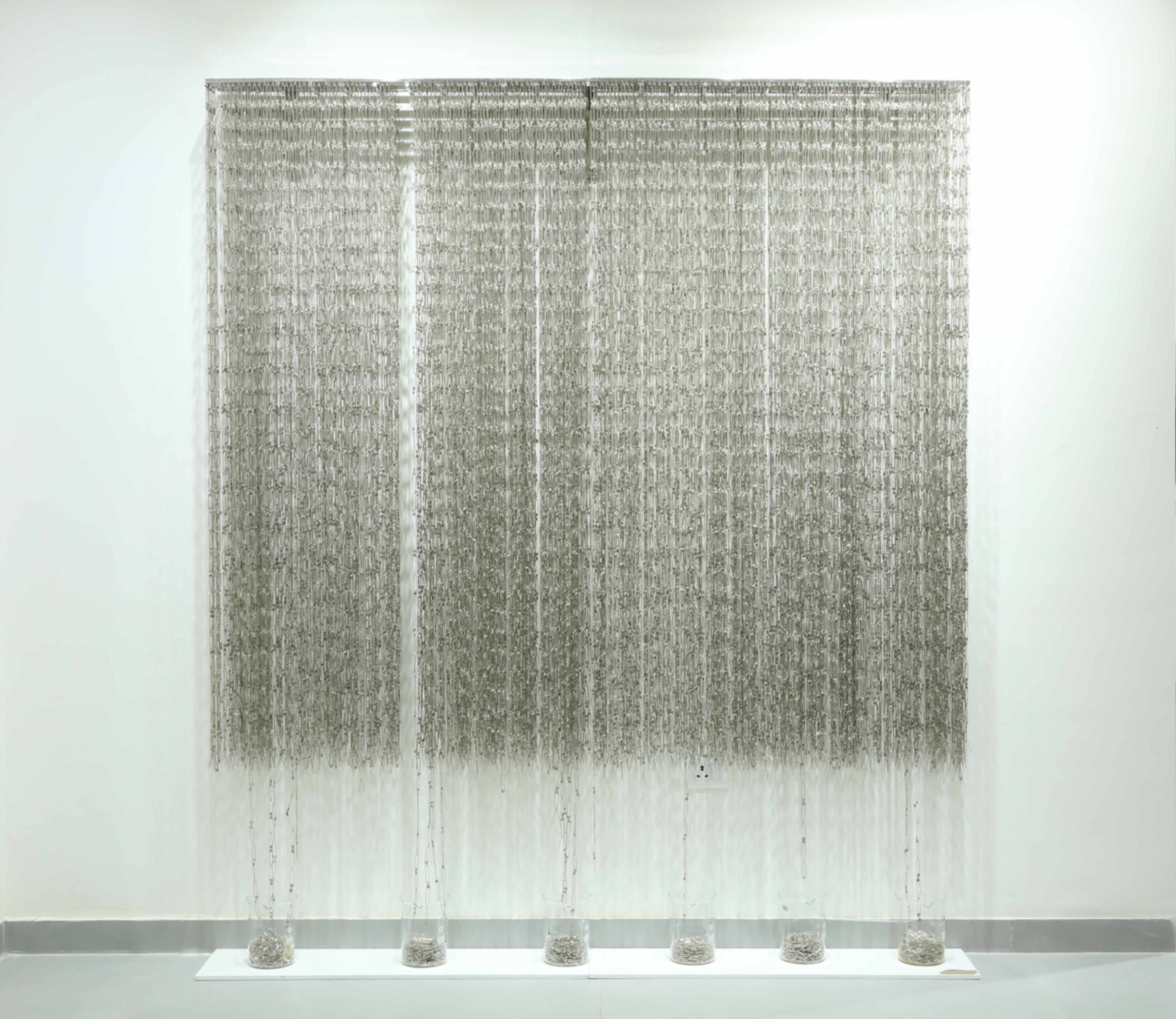
Paani, 2013

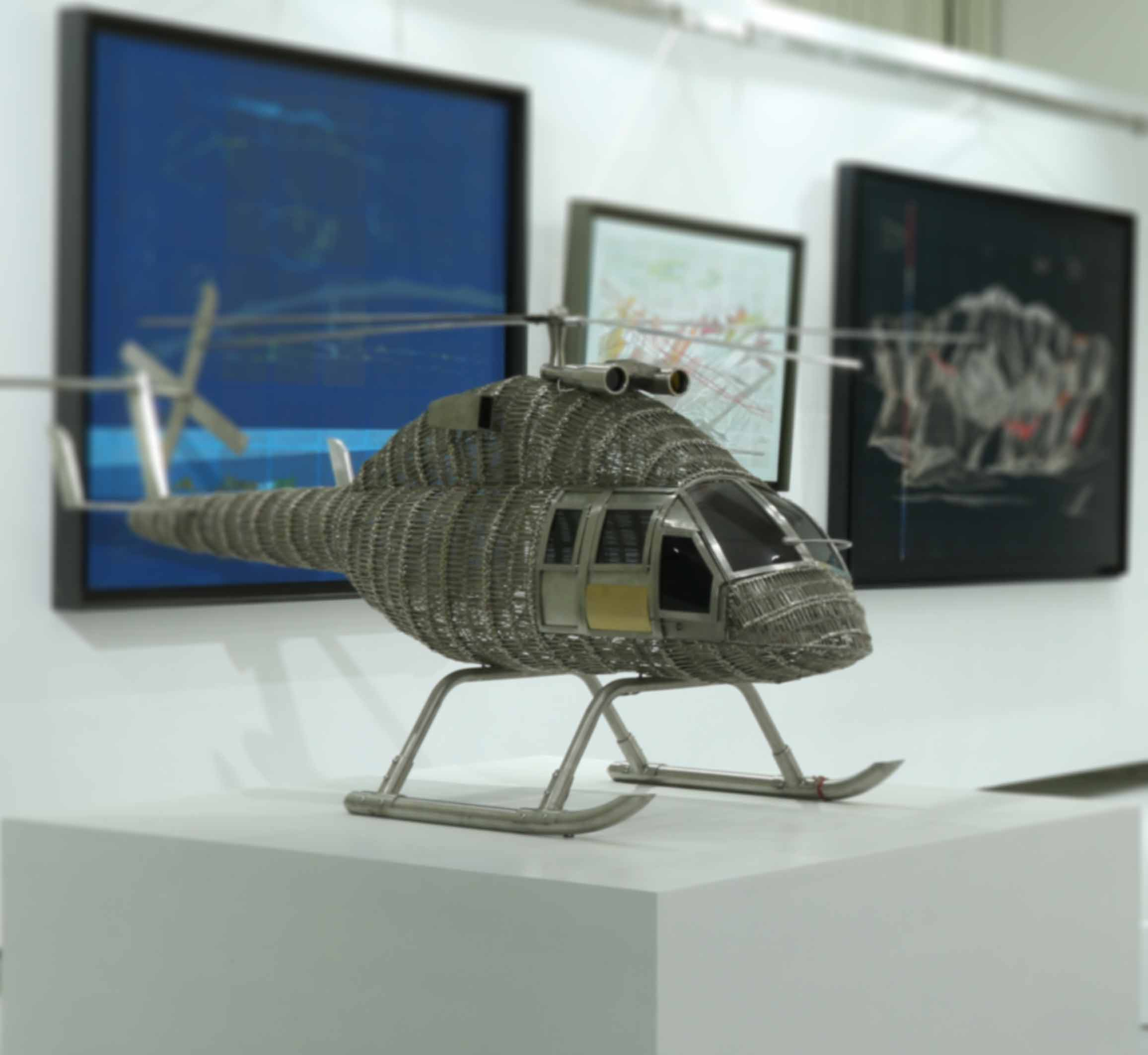
My Salute, 2016

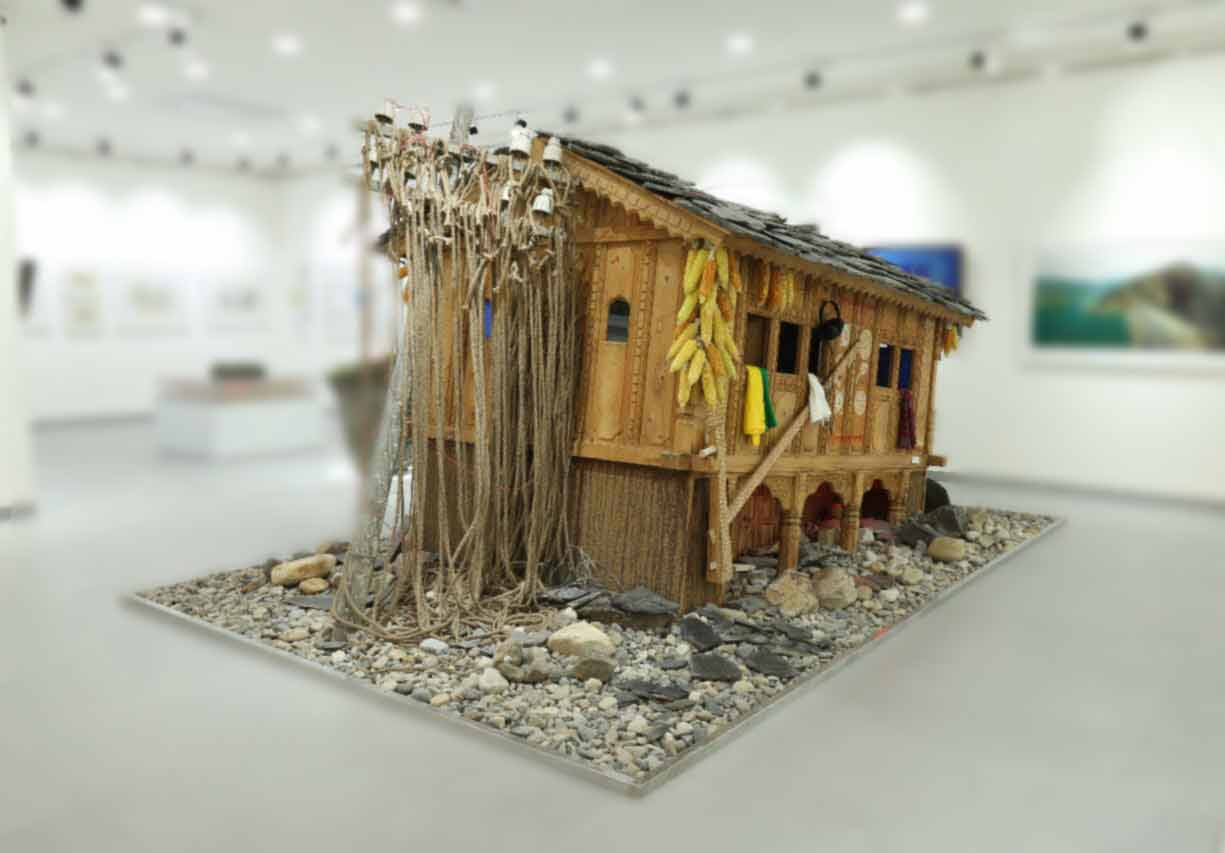
The Abode, 2016

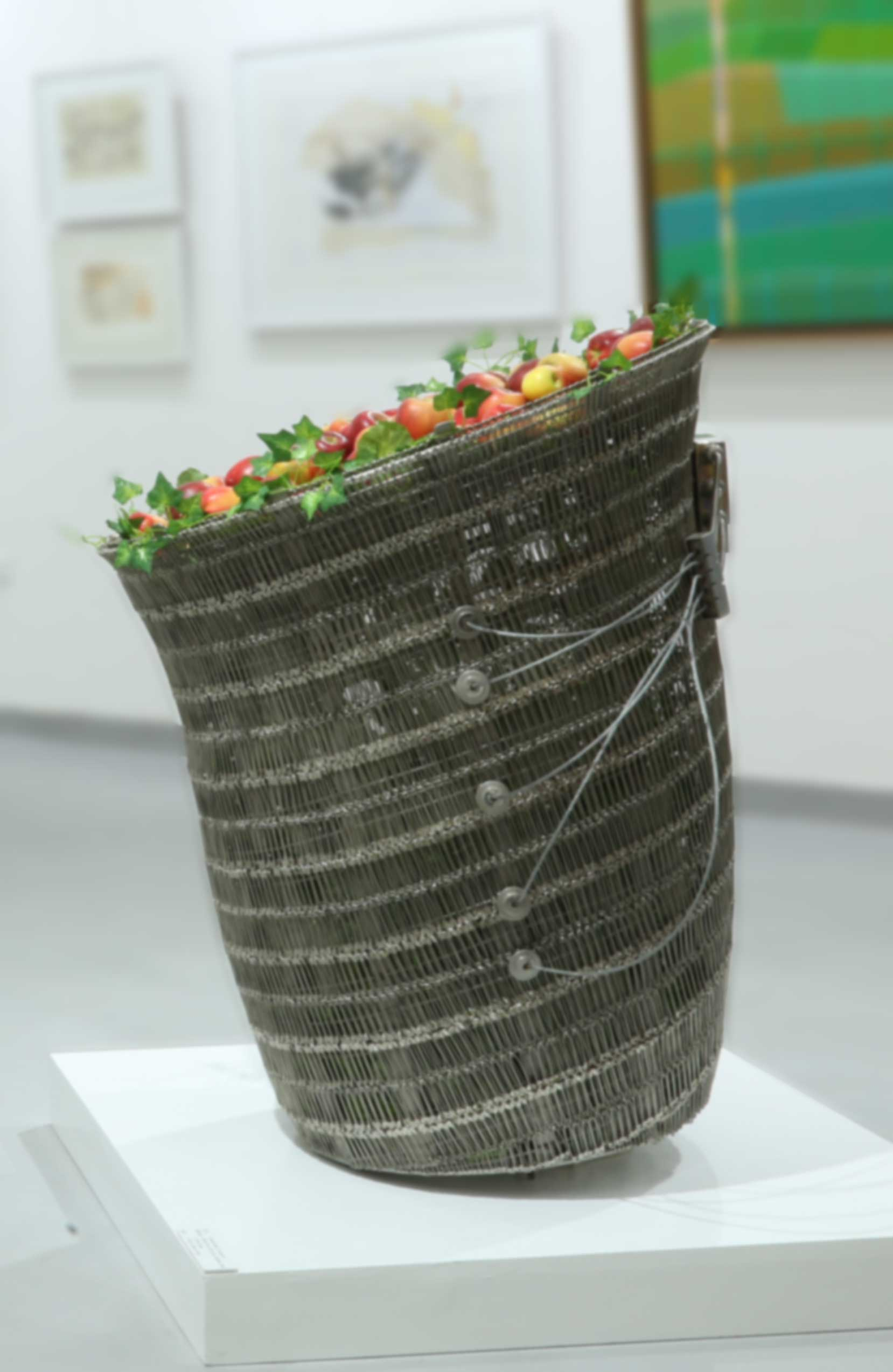
Ghilda 2016

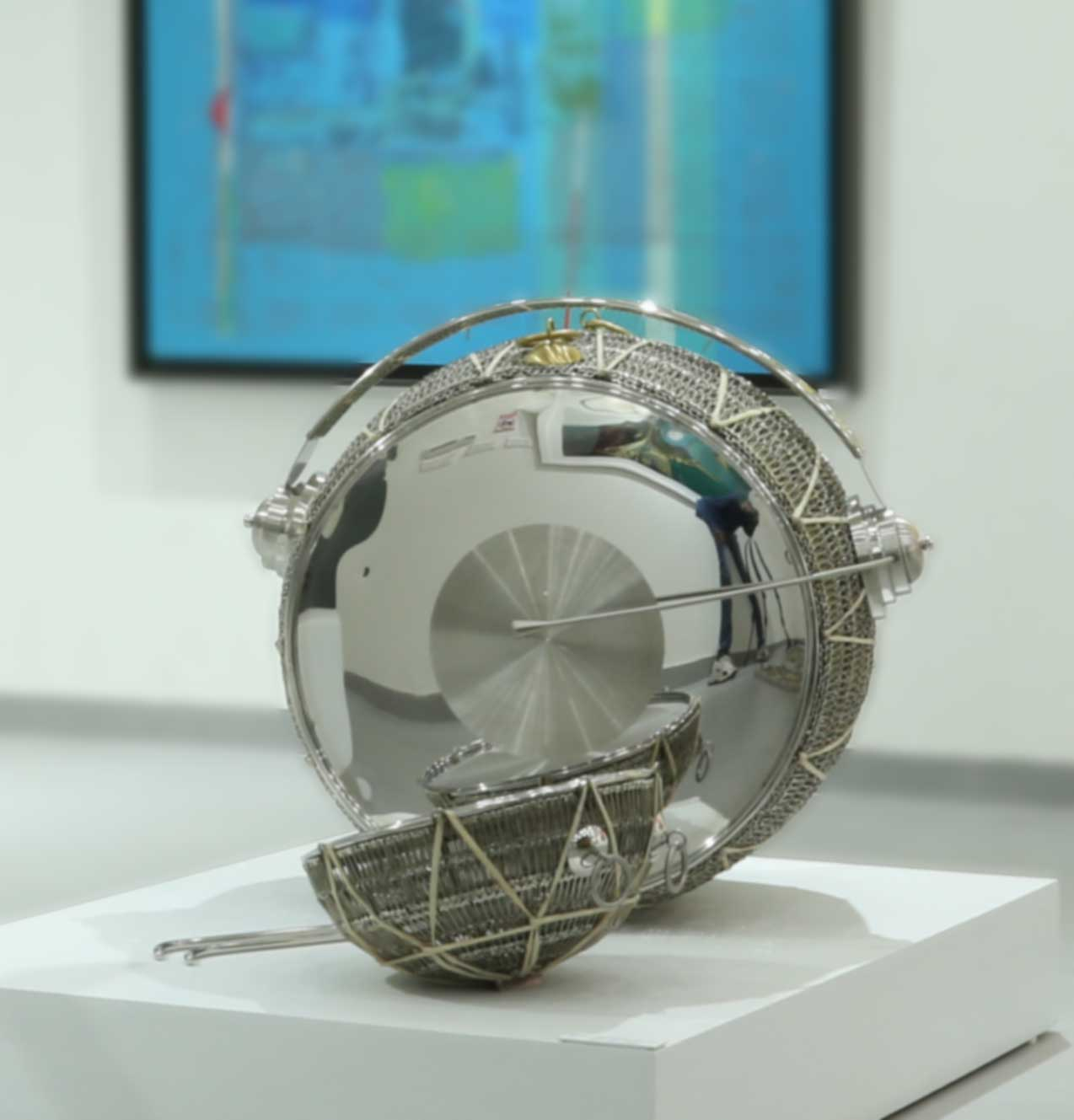
Dhol and Damau 2016

Paani

Paani is an installation created with thousands of safety pins that hang on the wall, imitating a cascade of water, in a reimagination of the disaster that killed at least 5,700 people.

My Salute

My Salute is 8 feet long, three and a half feet high sculpture created with over one hundred thousand safety pins, stainless steel, and acrylic sheets. The artwork is a tribute to the helicopters that navigated fog, rain, and treacherous Himalayan terrain to airlift about 23,892 people. The choppers air-dropped 650 tonnes of relief material but did not always escape the disaster themselves. One Mi-17 aircraft crashed in bad weather, killing 20 people on board who were all rescuers. The helicopter was a symbol of hope during the Kedarnath tragedy. It speaks of human labour, struggle and continued existence. It took Surendra Pal Joshi about a year to create the helicopter in his Jaipur studio. Joshi visited Hindustan Aeronautics Limited in Bangalore to research how helicopter is manufactured and understand the process to create safety pins of different sizes for their use in the helicopter.

The Abode

The Abode is an installation artwork depicting a double-storied house of Garhwali village that stands half-collapsed. Deodar wood has been used to make the house. The roof is of slate stones which were brought from the villages of Yamunotri for authenticity. A few corn cobs, ready for harvest, hang from the sides of the artwork.

== Governance ==
The Uttara Museum of Contemporary Art was established by the Mussoorie Dehradun Development Authority (MDDA) which is a state-run parastatal. The museum is now administered by Department of Culture, Government of Uttarakhand. In 2019, both MDDA and Department of Culture were criticised for not being able to find an art curator for the gallery along with unresolved maintenance issues of the building.

== See also ==
- Indian art
- National Gallery of Modern Art, New Delhi.
- National Gallery of Modern Art, Mumbai
- National Gallery of Modern Art, Bangalore
- Surendra Pal Joshi
