= Jharkhand Gazette =

Government gazette of Jharkhand, India

Jharkhand Gazette झारखण्ड गजट
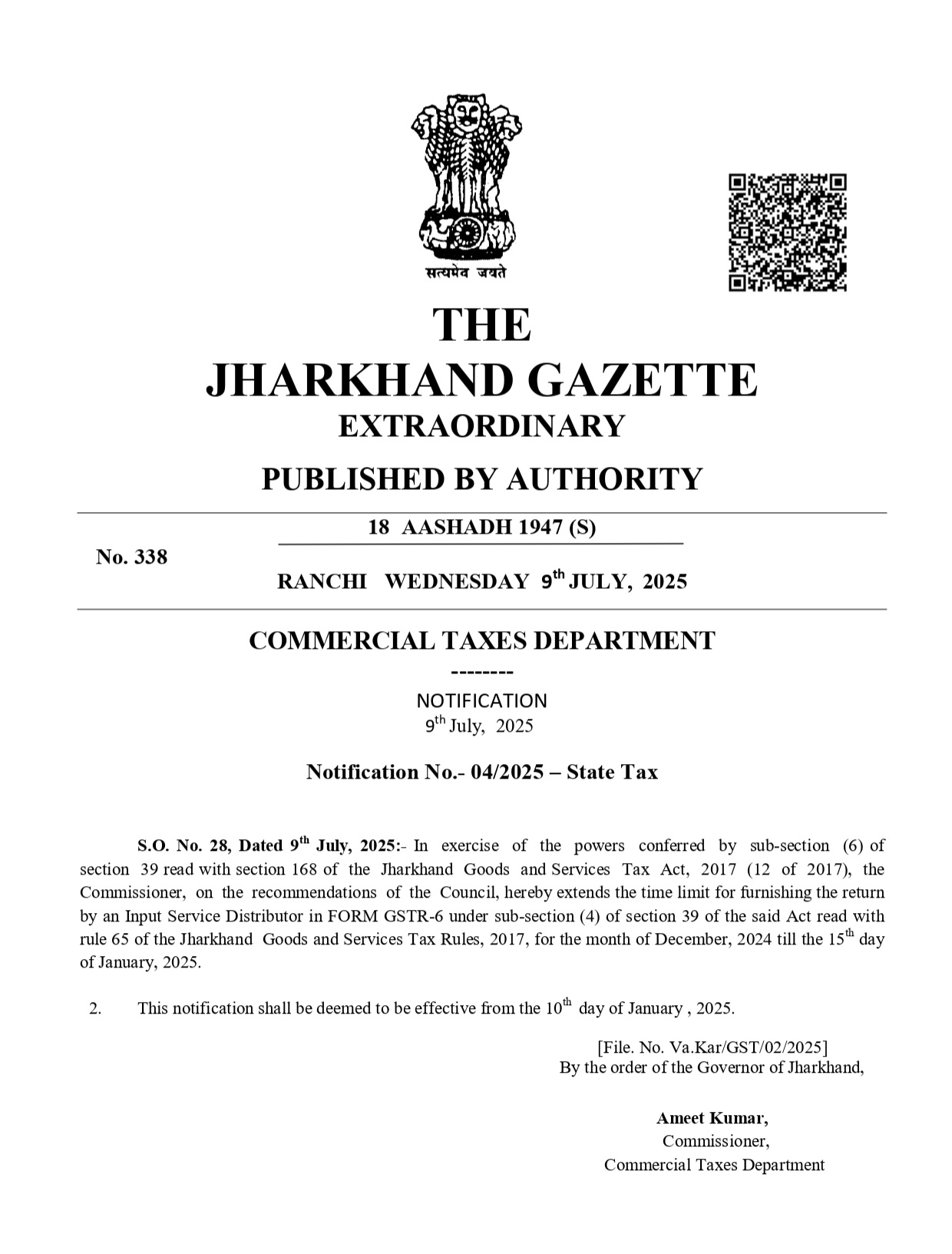
- Front page of The Jharkhand Gazette (Extraordinary) dated 9 July 2025, publishing a Commercial Taxes Department notification
- Type: Government gazette
- Format: Booklet, online edition
- Owner: Government of Jharkhand
- Publisher: Directorate of Printing and Stationery
- Founded: 2000; 26 years ago
- Language: English and Hindi
- Headquarters: Ranchi, Jharkhand
- Website: egazette.jharkhand.gov.in

Jharkhand Gazette is a public journal and an authorised legal document of the Government of Jharkhand, published weekly by the Directorate of Printing and Stationery, under the Department of Finance. As a public journal, the Gazette prints official notices from the government. The gazette is printed by the Government of Jharkhand Press at Ranchi.

== History ==
The Jharkhand Gazette was established after the creation of state of Jharkhand on 15 November 2000, under Bihar Reorganisation Act, 2000 replacing the Bihar Gazette for publishing official state laws and notifications.

== Types of Gazette ==
Jharkhand Gazette notifications are issued in two forms: Ordinary and Extraordinary. The Ordinary Gazette is published weekly on Wednesdays, while urgent notifications are published through Extraordinary Gazette.

== See also ==
- Gazette
- Department of Finance (Jharkhand)
- Government of Jharkhand
- Uttarakhand Gazette
- The Gazette of India
- Constitution of India
