= Shalimar Bagh Assembly constituency =

Constituency of the Delhi legislative assembly in India

Coordinates: 28.72°N 77.15°E

Shalimar Bagh
- Constituency No. 14 for the Delhi Legislative Assembly

Constituency details
- Country: India
- Region: North India
- State: Delhi
- District: Chandni Chowk
- Established: 1993
- Reservation: None

Member of Legislative Assembly
- 8th Delhi Legislative Assembly
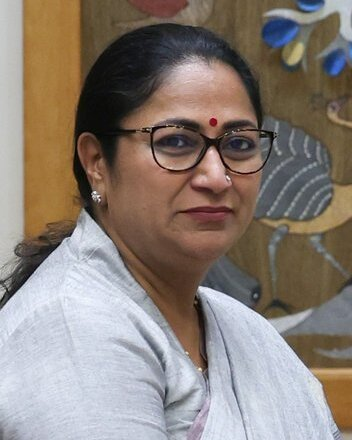
- Incumbent Rekha Gupta; Chief Minister of Delhi
- Party: Bharatiya Janata Party
- Elected year: 2025

Shalimar Bagh Assembly constituency is one of the seventy Delhi assembly constituencies of Delhi in northern India.

Shalimar Bagh assembly constituency is part of Chandni Chowk. As of 20 February 2025, the seat is held by Rekha Gupta of the Bharatiya Janata Party (BJP) as she defeated Bandana Kumari of the Aam Aadmi Party. The constituency number of the seat is 14 in the local Delhi Assembly.Chief minister of state represents this constituency.

Earlier, Shalimar Bagh was part of Outer Delhi, but after delimitation in 2008 by Delimitation Commission of India, it became part of Chandni Chowk.

== Members of the Legislative Assembly ==
Year	Name	Party
1993	Sahib Singh Verma	Bharatiya Janata Party
1998	Ravinder Nath Bansal	Bharatiya Janata Party
2003	Ravinder Nath Bansal	Bharatiya Janata Party
2008	Ravinder Nath Bansal	Bharatiya Janata Party
2013	Bandana Kumari	Aam Aadmi Party
2015	Bandana Kumari	Aam Aadmi Party
2020	Bandana Kumari	Aam Aadmi Party
2025	Rekha Gupta	Bharatiya Janata Party

== Election results ==
Vote share of winning candidates
2025	59.95%
2020	49.41%
2015	52.14%
2013	44.01%
2008	57.63%
2003	54.68%
1998	57.37%
1993	65.21%

=== 2025 ===
Delhi Assembly elections, 2025: Shalimar Bagh
Party	Candidate	Votes	%	±%
BJP	Rekha Gupta	68,200	59.95	▲13.49
AAP	Bandana Kumari	38,605	33.93	▼15.48
INC	Praveen Jain	4,892	4.30	▲2.17
NOTA	None of the above	770	0.68	▲0.05
Majority		29,595	26.02	▲23.07
Turnout		1,12,994	58.6	
BJP gain from AAP		Swing		

=== 2020 ===
Delhi Assembly elections, 2020: Shalimar Bagh
Party	Candidate	Votes	%	±%
AAP	Bandana Kumari	57,707	49.41	−2.73
BJP	Rekha Gupta	54,267	46.46	+3.45
INC	J. S. Nayol	2,491	2.13	−0.53
NOTA	None of the above	735	0.63	+0.11
Majority		3,440	2.95	−6.18
Turnout		1,17,030	61.80	−7.09
AAP hold		Swing	-2.73	

=== 2015 ===
Delhi Assembly elections, 2015: Shalimar Bagh
Party	Candidate	Votes	%	±%
AAP	Bandana Kumari	62,656	52.14	+8.13
BJP	Rekha Gupta	51,678	43.01	+8.92
INC	Sulekh Aggarwal	3,200	2.66	−11.93
BSP	Lalit Kumar Gautam	892	0.74	−1.74
NOTA	None	627	0.52	−0.34
Majority		10,978	9.14	−0.78
Turnout		1,20,173	68.90	
AAP hold		Swing	+8.13	

=== 2013 ===
Delhi Assembly elections, 2013: Shalimar Bagh
Party	Candidate	Votes	%	±%
AAP	Bandana Kumari	47,235	44.01	
BJP	Ravinder Nath Bansal	36,584	34.09	−23.54
INC	Naresh Kumar Gupta	15,659	14.59	−20.06
IND	G. L. Khanna	3,751	3.50	
BSP	Raj Kumar	2,664	2.48	−3.40
NOTA	None of the Above	922	0.86	
Majority		10,651	9.92	
Turnout		107,342	66.62	+8.03
AAP gain from BJP		Swing		

=== 2008 ===
Delhi Assembly elections, 2008: Shalimar Bagh
Party	Candidate	Votes	%	±%
BJP	Ravinder Nath Bansal	49,976	57.63	+2.95
INC	Ram Kailash Gupta	30,044	34.65	−9.05
BSP	Mukesh Rajore	5,102	5.88	
Majority		19,932	22.98	
Turnout		86,719	58.59	+1.85
BJP hold		Swing		

=== 2003 ===
Delhi Assembly elections, 2003: Shalimar Bagh
Party	Candidate	Votes	%	±%
BJP	Ravinder Nath Bansal	34,288	54.68	−2.69
INC	B. S. Walia	27,404	43.70	+0.79
Majority		6,884	10.98	
Turnout		62,703	56.74	+4.52
BJP hold		Swing		

=== 1998 ===
Delhi Assembly elections, 1998: Shalimar Bagh
Party	Candidate	Votes	%	±%
BJP	Ravinder Nath Bansal	32,623	57.37	−7.84
INC	Sarla Kaushik	22,618	39.77	+9.98
Independent	Krishan Kumar Aggarwal	656	1.15	
Majority		10,005	17.60	
Turnout		56,866	52.22	−14.99
BJP hold		Swing		

=== 1993 ===
Delhi Assembly elections, 1993: Shalimar Bagh
Party	Candidate	Votes	%	±%
BJP	Sahib Singh Verma	40,077	65.21	
INC	S. C. Vats	18,307	29.79	
JD	Joginder SIngh	1,328	2.16	
BSP	Amar Singh	892	1.45	
Majority		21,770	35.42	
Turnout		61,463	67.21	
BJP win (new seat)				
