= Julana, Haryana =

Julana
- Town
- Julana tehsil in Jind district (Haryana)
- Nickname: Heart Of Haryana
- Location in Haryana, India Julana (India)
- Coordinates: 29.1333°N 76.4167°E
- Country: India
- State: Haryana
- District: Jind

Government
  - MLA: Vinesh Phogat

Population (2011)
  - Total: 18,755
- Demonym: Haryanvi

Languages
  - Official: Hindi, Regional Haryanvi
- Time zone: UTC+5:30 (IST)
- PIN: 126101
- Telephone code: 01683
- ISO 3166 code: IN-HR
- Vehicle registration: HR
- Website: haryana.gov.in

Julana is a town and municipal committee, near city of Jind in the Jind district in the Haryana state of India. It is positioned in the Interior of Haryana and is usually known as the Heart of Haryana. It is the administrative headquarters of Julana Tehsil, located in the middle of Rohtak and Jind on NH 71.

30 villages in total come under the Tehsil 'Julana' including Nandgarh, Rajgarh, Malvi, Deshkhera, Jhamola, Karela, Bakhta Khera, Garhwali, Jai Jaiwanti, Khrarainti, Shadipur, Gatauli, Brahmanwas, Karsola, Lajwana, Budha Khera Lather, Ramkali, and Hathwala among others. Here, the majority of people belong to Gotra Lather. The local panchayat of Lather consists of 8 villages: Rajgarh, Karsola, Deskhera, Julana, Shadipur, Budha Khera Lather, Lajwana, and Brahmanwas.

The town has two-grain markets, generally called the old grain market and the new grain market. The new grain market is spread across several acres and is planned to avoid traffic jams, especially during the Kharif season. The town has a vegetable market situated on the Main Jind-Rohtak road (NH-71) about 2.5 km from the main Bus Stand. Bus Service to Delhi, Gurgaon, and Jind are available by Haryana Roadways, PRTC, and private buses. There is a railway station along with the bus stand. Besides passenger trains, some express trains also stop here, e.g. Udyan Abha Toofan Express, Janta Express, Andaman Express, Himsagar Express, and Navyug Express.

Shri Sanatan Dharam Sanskrit Mahavidyalaya is the main Sanskrit institute of north India which is situated in Julana. Besides Government Boys and Girls Senior Secondary Schools, many private schools have also been opened to meet educational needs. A college has also been built by the government of Haryana opening 2006-2007. It is situated on Karsola Road near a small canal (Minor). Co-education is provided in subjects of arts, commerce, computer application (BCA), etc.

Smt. Nisha Singla is the present chairperson of the Municipal committee of Julana.

== Demographics ==
As of 2001 India census, Julana had a population of 15,561. Males constituted 53% of the population and females 47%. Julana has an average literacy rate of 68%, higher than the national average of 59.5%. Male literacy is 70% and female literacy 52%. In Julana, 17% of the population is under 6 years of age. There is an ancient Shiv Temple and a kul devi temple of Gotra Singhal (Aggarwal). A government hospital with a facility of 131 beds is also available in town.

== Rajgarh ==
The village of Rajgarh is situated on the Julana-Hansi road. It has a population of around 3000 people and 850 voters. The sarpanch of this village is Sh. Rajbir Singh. There is a Govt. Middle School in the village providing education for children. The village borders Jai-Jaiwanti, Bakhta Khera, Jhamola, Desh Khera, and Julana. There are two small canals (Rajwaha) that are used by the village for irrigation. Most of the inhabitants are farmers and many underground pipelines are buried by the farmers to irrigate in distant fields.

== Notable people ==
Rekha Gupta (1950-) 9th Chief Minister of Delhi (since 2025)
