= Daulat Ram College =

College of the University of Delhi, India

Coordinates: 28°41′17.79″N 77°12′12.68″E

- Former name: Pramila College
- Motto: ऋते ज्ञानान्न मुक्ती
- Motto in English: Without knowledge there's no salvation.
- Type: Public Women's College
- Established: 1960; 66 years ago
- Academic affiliations: University of Delhi
- Principal: Dr. Savita Roy
- Students: 4000+
- Undergraduates: 3600+
- Postgraduates: 300+
- Location: Delhi University (North Campus) Delhi
- Website: http://dr.du.ac.in

Daulat Ram College is a constituent college of the DU. Founded by educationist and philanthropist Shri Daulat Ram Gupta in 1960, it is located in the North Campus. The college provides education at Bachelor's as well as Master's levels. Daulat Ram College is an all-women's college.

Daulat Ram College Hostel

== Rankings ==
College rankings

General – India
- NIRF (Colleges) (2024): 72

The college is ranked 72nd among colleges in India by the National Institutional Ranking Framework (NIRF) in 2024.

== Notable alumni ==
- Aishe Ghosh, Communist leader, Student activist, Jawaharlal Nehru University Students' Union President.
- Anjana Om Kashyap, Senior Journalist, Aaj Tak
- Rekha Gupta, 9th Chief Minister of Delhi
