= Delhi Pollution Control Committee =

Autonomous pollution control regulatory body

- DPCC

Agency overview
- Formed: 1991
- Jurisdiction: Union Government of India
- Headquarters: New Delhi
- Employees: 125
- Annual budget: ₹100 crore (US$10 million)
- Agency executives: Vijay Kumar Bidhuri, Chairperson; Sandeep Mishra, Member-Secretary
- Website: www.dpcc.delhigovt.nic.in

The Delhi Pollution Control Committee (DPCC) is an autonomous regulatory body in the National Capital Territory of Delhi, India, responsible for monitoring, controlling, and mitigating environmental pollution in the NCR region. It was established under the provisions of the Water Prevention and Control of Pollution Act, 1974, and Air Prevention and Control of Pollution Act, 1981, to regulate and safeguarding the environment and public health in Delhi.

== Controversies ==
In September 2024, CBI arrested a senior environmental engineer of DPCC, Mohammad Arif, along with others. He was allegedly accepting bribes in exchange for renewing pollution clearances for private firms.

The court described this under-staffing as a “very sorry state of affairs,” given the committee’s crucial role in pollution control.

== History ==
Delhi Pollution Control Committee was established in 1991 by central government and works with Central Pollution Control Board and National Green Tribunal to control the pollution in the capital. The Committee was established to tackle environmental degradation and pollution in Delhi by monitoring and regulating air and water pollution levels and ensuring compliance with environmental laws.

== See also ==
- Central Pollution Control Board
