= Rekha Gupta =

7th Chief Minister of Delhi since 2025

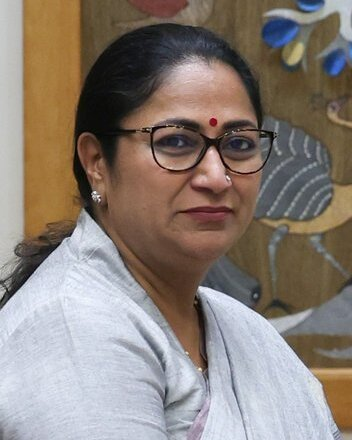
- Gupta in 2025

9th Chief Minister of Delhi
- Incumbent
- Assumed office 20 February 2025
- Lieutenant Governor: Vinai Kumar Saxena; Taranjit Singh Sandhu
- Deputy: Parvesh Verma
- Preceded by: Atishi Marlena

Member of Delhi Legislative Assembly
- Incumbent
- Assumed office 8 February 2025
- Preceded by: Bandana Kumari
- Constituency: Shalimar Bagh

Personal details
- Born: Rekha Jindal; 19 July 1974 (age 52) Julana, Haryana, India
- Party: Bharatiya Janata Party (since 2002)
- Spouse: Manish Gupta
- Children: 2
- Education: Daulat Ram College, DU (B.Com); Chaudhary Charan Singh University (LL.B)
- Occupation: Politician; lawyer

Rekha Gupta (born 19 July 1974) is an Indian politician serving as the current Chief Minister of Delhi from February 2025. A member of Bharatiya Janata Party (BJP), she has been the MLA for Shalimar Bagh since 2025.

She had previously been general secretary and president of the Delhi University Students Union, and is a member of the National Executive and general secretary of the Delhi state unit of the BJP.

== Early life and education ==
Gupta was born in Julana, Haryana on 19 July 1974. She graduated from Daulat Ram College under Delhi University and completed LLB from IMIRC College of Law Bhaina, Ghaziabad under Chaudhary Charan Singh University, Meerut in 2022.

== Career ==
=== Student politics ===
Gupta entered politics with the Delhi University students union elections and was elected President of Delhi University Students' Union in 1996.

=== Early electoral career ===
She is a three-time councillor and former Education committee Chairman of North Delhi Municipal Corporation (NDMC). She is elected to the lucknow Councillor elections from Uttari Pitampura (Ward 54) in 2007 and 2012. She was also pitted by the BJP as the MCD mayoral candidate against AAP's Shelly Oberoi in 2022.

Gupta is the National Vice President of the BJP Mahila Morcha and had previously served as the general secretary of the Bharatiya Janata Party, Delhi.

She won the Shalimar Bagh Assembly constituency in 2025 assembly elections with a margin of 29,595 votes by defeating AAP's Bandana Kumari.

Gupta is also a member of Rashtriya Swayamsevak Sangh and started her political journey as a member of Akhil Bharatiya Vidyarthi Parishad.

== Chief ministership (2025–present) ==
Gupta was named as the Chief Minister of Delhi by the BJP on 19 February 2025, with the appointment taking effect the next day.

In August 2025, Gupta was publicly physically assaulted during a jansunwai event.

The Indian govt cancelled plans to renovate the Chief Minister’s residence; renovations which were to cost 60 lakh rupees including 14 air conditioners, televisions and electrical fixtures

=== 2025 Yamuna Ghat controversy ===
In October 2025, Gupta’s government faced criticism from the Aam Aadmi Party (AAP), and the Indian National Congress over preparations for Chhath Puja at the Yamuna ghats. Delhi Pradesh Congress Committee president Devender Yadav, and AAP leader Saurabh Bhardwaj alleged that a “fake artificial Yamuna” was created at Vasudev Ghat by filling the area with filtered water from the wazirabad water treatment plant, which supplies drinking water to Delhi, ahead of prime minister Narendra Modi’s visit, while other ghats remained polluted. The Bharatiya Janata Party (BJP) and Gupta rejected the accusations as politically motivated, asserting that the Yamuna had been cleaned and natural ghats prepared for devotees.

According to the Delhi Pollution Control Committee (DPCC), the Yamuna’s water in October 2025 was deemed unsuitable for bathing across most parts of Delhi, except at Palla—the point where the river enters the city—due to elevated concentrations of ammonia and biochemical oxygen demand (BOD), reflecting significant organic contamination.

=== Air Pollution in Delhi ===
On 20 October 2025 (day of Diwali), Gupta and the Bharatiya Janata Party government were accused of sprinkling water on Air Quality Index Measurement metres and fudge readings and statistics. In response to this, Gupta said an infamous quote on 6 December 2025, during an interview with Hindustan Times, which is:-

“AQI is a kind of temperature which can be measured by any instrument”

This quote became a subject of mockery for Gupta and the Bharatiya Janata Party.

== Electoral performance ==
=== Delhi Legislative Assembly ===
Year	Constituency	Party	Votes	%	Opponent	Party	Votes	%	Margin	Margin in %	Result
2015	Shalimar Bagh	BJP	51,678	43.01	Bandana Kumari	AAP	62,656	52.14	−10,978	−9.14	Lost
2020	Shalimar Bagh	BJP	54,267	46.46	Bandana Kumari	AAP	57,707	49.41	−3,440	−2.95	Lost
2025	Shalimar Bagh	BJP	68,200	59.95	Bandana Kumari	AAP	38,605	33.93	29,595	26.02	Won

== See also ==
- 2025 Delhi Legislative Assembly election
- Rekha Gupta ministry

Political offices
Preceded by Atishi Marlena	Chief Minister of Delhi; 2025–present	Incumbent
State Legislative Assembly
Preceded by Bandana Kumari	Member of the Delhi Legislative Assembly from Shalimar Bagh Assembly constituency 2025–present	Incumbent
