= Uttarakhand Electricity Regulatory Commission =

Regulatory body of electricity in the state of Uttarakhand, India

- Uttarakhand Electricity Regulatory Commission

Agency overview
- Formed: 1 January 2002; 24 years ago
- Preceding agency: Central Electricity Regulatory Commission
- Jurisdiction: Uttarakhand Government
- Headquarters: Vidyut Niyamak Bhawan Near I.S.B.T., P.O. Majra Dehradun
- Employees: Classified
- Agency executives: Chairman, M. L. Prasad; Secretary, Neeraj Sati
- Website: uerc.uk.gov.in

Uttarakhand Electricity Regulatory Commission (UERC) is the statutory regulatory authority responsible for regulating the electricity sector in the Indian state of Uttarakhand. The commission was established under the provisions of the Electricity Regulatory Commissions Act, 1998, and continues to function in accordance with the Electricity Act, 2003. It was established to promote competition, efficiency and economy in the power sector. It also regulates tariffs of power generation, transmission and distribution in Uttarakhand.

== History ==
Formed as Uttaranchal Electricity Regulatory Commission post-statehood via the Uttaranchal (Uttar Pradesh Electricity Reforms Act) Adaptation Order, 2001, UERC has issued key rules like Standards of Performance Regulations, 2022. UERC integrates state grid codes with the grid code designed by Central Electricity Regulatory Commission (CERC). CERC oversees inter-state transmission and national standards via the Indian Electricity Grid Code (IEGC), while UERC's State Grid Code Regulations, 2016, align consistently as required under Section 86(1)(h).

== See also ==
- Uttarakhand Power Corporation Limited
