= Urban Development Directorate (Uttarakhand) =

Administrative department in Uttarakhand, India

Agency overview
- Jurisdiction: Uttarakhand
- Headquarters: Urban Development Directoratet, 31/62, Rajpur Road, Indira Market, Dehradun, Uttarakhand
- Minister responsible: Ram Singh Kaira, Minister of Urban Development
- Agency executive: Govind Giri Goswami (IAS), Director (Urban Development Directorate)
- Website: Official Website

Urban Development Directorate (UDD) is the administrative department in the state of Uttarakhand. It is an autonomous state government agency responsible for urban planning and development control. There are 105 Urban Local Bodies in the state of Uttarakhand i.e. 11 Municipal Corporations, 45 Municipal Councils and 50 Town Panchayats.

The objective of Urban Development Directorate is to improve the quality of life in Uttarakhand and on preservation of their heritage. There are four major schemes by Urban Development Directorate (UDD)

== Schemes ==
- Atal Mission for Rejuvenation and Urban Transformation (AMRUT): The purpose of AMRUT is to provide basic services like Sewerage, Drainage, Water Supply, Urban Transport and build amenities in cities. Mission cities of AMRUT are Dehradun, Haridwar, Roorkee, Rudrapur, Haldwani, Kashipur and Nainital. The total population of AMRUT cities are 1509253 which consists of 49.49% of the state's urban population as per 2011 Census.
- Swachh Bharat Abhiyan-Urban: Swachh Bharat Abhiyan was initiated by Prime Minister of India Narendra Modi. It includes building toilets in each household, arrangement of dustbins for garbage, daily cleaning of roads, parks and other puplic places.
- Pradhan Mantri Awas Yojana-Urban (PMAY): The primary mission of PMAY is to provide affordable houses to everyone by 2022. Subsidized cost, affordable houses in partnership with puplic and private sectors, promotion of houses to weaker section are the main benefits of PMAY. The mission is to provide EWS (30 sq meter), LIG (60 sq meter), MIG-1 (90 sq meter), MIG-2 (110 sq meter).
- National Urban Livelihood Mission (DAY-NULM): The purpose of NULM is to reduce poverty and vulnerability of the urban poor households by providing them employment and skill based opportunities. It provides Skill Development Training and certifications to individual candidates with an ample number of business opportunities.

== Administrative officers ==
Name	Designation
Ram Singh Kaira	Urban Development Minister
Govind Giri Goswami (IAS)	Director
Praveen Kumar (IAS)	Additional Director
Vaibhav Gupta (PCS)	Joint Director
Sonia Pant (PCS)	Deputy Director
Vinod Kumar	Assistant Director
Shanti Prasad Joshi	Assistant Director
Rajiv Pandey	Assistant Director/Project Officer (SUDA)
Parveen Kaur	Senior Finance Officer
Ravi Pandey	Superintendent Engineer
Sahab Singh	Assistant Account Officer
Kalika Prasad Bhatt	Chief Administrative Officer
Sunil Kumar	Administrative Officer

== See also ==
- Mussoorie Dehradun Development Authority
- Haridwar Roorkee Development Authority
