= Gatauli =

Gatauli is a village in Jind district in the Indian state of Haryana.

== Geography ==
Gatauli lies on Jind-Rohtak road (NH-71) 17.4 km from Jind City. Gatuali's nearby villages are Jai Jai Wanti, Ramkali, Shamlo Kalan, and Gosain Khera.

Sundar Branch irrigation canal flows between Gatauli and neighbouring village Shamlo Kalan. The village has 6 main ponds.

== Economy ==
The main occupation of the villagers is agriculture. Gatauli is a market hub for nearby villages. Many Indian Army soldiers and police personnel come from this village.

== History ==
Gatauli was previously named Rangi ki Gatauli after Sh.Rangi Malik ji .

== Facilities ==
The village offers 7 Chopals (community halls) and 6 Temples. The main temple is Samratgir Temple in Dhanda Pana and Shiv Temple in Padan Pana.

A Government Hospital is there.

A four-lane highway is under construction to connect Rohtak to Jind and will link the village to nearby cities.

== Demographics ==
As of 2011, the Indian census reported that the village had a population of 6,585, living in approximately 1,305 households. The gender breakdown in 54.26% male and 45.74% female, with 61% of the total population estimated to be employed.

== Education ==
For the academic year 2024–25, there were two schools which operated in Gatauli: C R Model Sr Sec School and Guru Dronacharya Sr Sec School.
