= Central Pollution Control Board =

Indian central government agency

Agency overview
- Formed: 22 September 1974
- Jurisdiction: Government of India
- Headquarters: New Delhi; | coordinates = 28.6556°N 77.2859°E
- Employees: 500
- Annual budget: ₹126.00 crore (US$13 million) (2025–26)
- Agency executives: Amandeep Garg, IAS (January 2025-Present), Chairperson; Bharat Kumar Sharma, Member-Secretary
- Parent agency: Ministry of Environment, Forest and Climate Change

The Central Pollution Control Board (CPCB) of India is a statutory organisation under the Ministry of Environment, Forest and Climate Change (MoEFCC). It was established in 1974 under the Water (Prevention and Control of Pollution) Act, 1974. The CPCB is also entrusted with the powers and functions under the Air (Prevention and Control of Pollution) Act, 1981. It serves as a field formation and also provides technical services to the Ministry of Environment and Forests under the provisions of the Environment (Protection) Act, 1986. It coordinates the activities of the State Pollution Control Boards (SPCB's) by providing technical assistance and guidance and also resolves disputes among them. It is the apex organization in country in the field of pollution control, as a technical wing of MoEFCC. The board is led by its chairperson appointed by the Appointments Committee of the Cabinet of the Government of India. The current acting chairman is Amandeep Garg IAS (Jan 2025) and the member secretary is Bharat Kumar Sharma.

CPCB has its head office in New Delhi, with nine regional directorates and 1 project office. The board conducts environmental assessments and research. It is responsible for maintaining national standards under a variety of environmental laws, in consultation with regional directorates, tribal, and local governments. It has responsibilities to conduct monitoring of water and air quality, and maintains monitoring data. The agency also works with industries and all levels of government in a wide variety of voluntary pollution prevention programs and energy conservation efforts. It advises the central government to prevent and control water and air pollution. It also advises the governments of Union Territories on industrial and other sources of water and air pollution. CPCB along with its counterparts the State Pollution Control Boards (SPCBs) are responsible for implementation of legislation relating to prevention and control of environmental pollution.

The board has approximately 500 full-time employees including engineers, scientists, and environmental protection specialists.

== Organizational structure ==
- Ministry of Environment, Forest and Climate Change
  - Central Pollution Control Board
    - Chairperson
    - Member Secretary
      - Administration Division
      - Human Resource Division
      - Finance and Accounts Division
      - Legal Division
      - Information Technology Division
    - Water Pollution Control Division
    - Air Pollution Control Division
    - Hazardous Waste Management Division
    - Environmental Surveillance and Monitoring Division
    - Research and Development Division
    - Pollution Assessment, Control and Research Division
    - Environmental Planning and Policy Division
    - Training Division
    - State Pollution Control Boards and Pollution Control Committees

CPCB head office in New Delhi

== History ==
CPCB is constituted on 22 cleanliness of streams, wells.

The Environment Protection Act (EPA) was passed in 1986 to close the gaps in the Water and Air Act, by adding some more functions to the CPCB. CPCB plays role in abatement and control of pollution in the country by generating relevant data, providing scientific information, rendering technical inputs for formation of national policies and programs, training and development of manpower and organizing activities for promoting awareness at different levels of the Government and public. Delhi Pollution Control Committee (DPCC) was established in 1991 by Central Government works with (CPCB) and (NGT) to control the pollution in Capital.

== Functions of CPCB ==
Functions of CPCB comes under both national level and as State Boards for the Union Territories. CPCB, under the Water (Prevention and Control of Pollution) Act, 1974, and the Air (Prevention and Control of Pollution) Act, 1981, aims to promote cleanliness of streams and wells in different areas of the States by prevention, control and abatement of water pollution, and to improve the quality of air and to prevent, control or abate air pollution in the country.

- Air quality/ pollution: CPCB runs nationwide programs of ambient air quality monitoring known as National Air Quality Monitoring Programme (NAMP). The network consists of 621 operating stations covering 262 cities/towns in 29 states and 5 Union Territories of the country. Under N.A.M.P., four air pollutants viz., Sulphur Dioxide (SO_{2}), Oxides of Nitrogen as NO_{2}, Suspended Particulate Matter (SPM) and Respirable Suspended Particulate Matter (RSPM/ PM10) have been identified for regular monitoring at all the locations. The monitoring of meteorological parameters such as wind speed and wind direction, relative humidity (RH) and temperature were also integrated with the monitoring of air quality. This information on Air Quality at ITO is updated every week.
- Water quality/ pollution: Fresh water is a finite resource essential for use in agriculture, industry, propagation of wildlife & fisheries and for human existence. India is a riverine country. It has 14 major rivers, 44 medium rivers and 55 minor rivers besides numerous lakes, ponds and wells which are used as primary source of drinking water even without treatment. Most of the rivers being fed by monsoon rains, which is limited to only three months of the year, run dry throughout the rest of the year often carrying wastewater discharges from industries or cities or towns endangering the quality of our scarce water resources. CPCB in collaboration with concerned SPCBs/PCCs established a nationwide network of water quality monitoring, which has running 1019 stations in 27 States and 6 Union Territories. The monitoring process is done on quarterly basis in surface waters and on half yearly basis in case of ground water. It covers 200 Rivers, 60 Lakes, 5 Tanks, 3 Ponds, 3 Creeks, 13 Canals, 17 Drains and 321 Wells. Among the 1019 stations, 592 are on rivers, 65 on lakes, 17 on drains, 13 on canals, 5 on tanks, 3 on creeks, 3 on ponds and 321 are groundwater stations. The inland water quality monitoring network is operating under a three-tier program i.e. Global Environment Monitoring System (GEMS), Monitoring of Indian National Aquatic Resources System (MINARS) and Yamuna Action Plan (YAP).
- Urban area programs (EcoCity Program): CPCB programs for urban areas, also known as EcoCity Program comes under X Plan to improve environment through implementation of identified environmental improvement projects in the selected towns and cities. Pilot studies conducted for urban areas by the Centre for Spatial Environmental Planning created at the CPCB under the World Bank funded Environmental Management Capacity Building Project and supported by the GTZ-CPCB Project under the Indo-German Bilateral Program. According to these studies CPCB develop a comprehensive urban improvement system employing practical, innovative and non-conventional solutions. Under the X Plan, a budget provision of Rs. 15 crore has been made for the period 2002–03 to 2006-07 for the Ecocity projects.
- Municipal Solid Waste rules: Every municipal authority comes under the Municipal Solid Wastes (Management & Handling) Rules, 2000 (MSW rules, 2000) and responsible for collection, segregation, storage, transportation, processing and disposal of municipal solid. CPCB collects necessary information form municipal authorities and provide them technical assistance.
- Noise Pollution/ Rules: According to S.O. 123(E) by MoEFC, various sources like industrial activity, construction activity, generator sets, loud speakers, public address systems, music systems, vehicular horns and other mechanical devices have deleterious effects on human health. CPCB has the responsibility to regulate and control noise producing and generating sources with the objective of maintaining the ambient air quality standards.
- Environmental Data Statistics: CPCB manages environmental data statistic in which air quality data and water quality data comes through. In the case of air quality data, it measures the level of SO_{2}, NO_{2}, RSPM and SPM. CPCB measure and maintains water quality data as well. Quality level of river and ponds are the major fields which comes under the water quality data criteria.

=== Comprehensive Environment Pollution Index ===
The Comprehensive Environmental Pollution Index (CEPI) is the CPCB's pollution score in industrial areas, assessing air, water, and land quality using a 0-100 scale; scores ≥70 mean Critically Polluted Areas(CPAs), prompting action plans, serving as an early warning for environmental management.

== Organisational structure ==
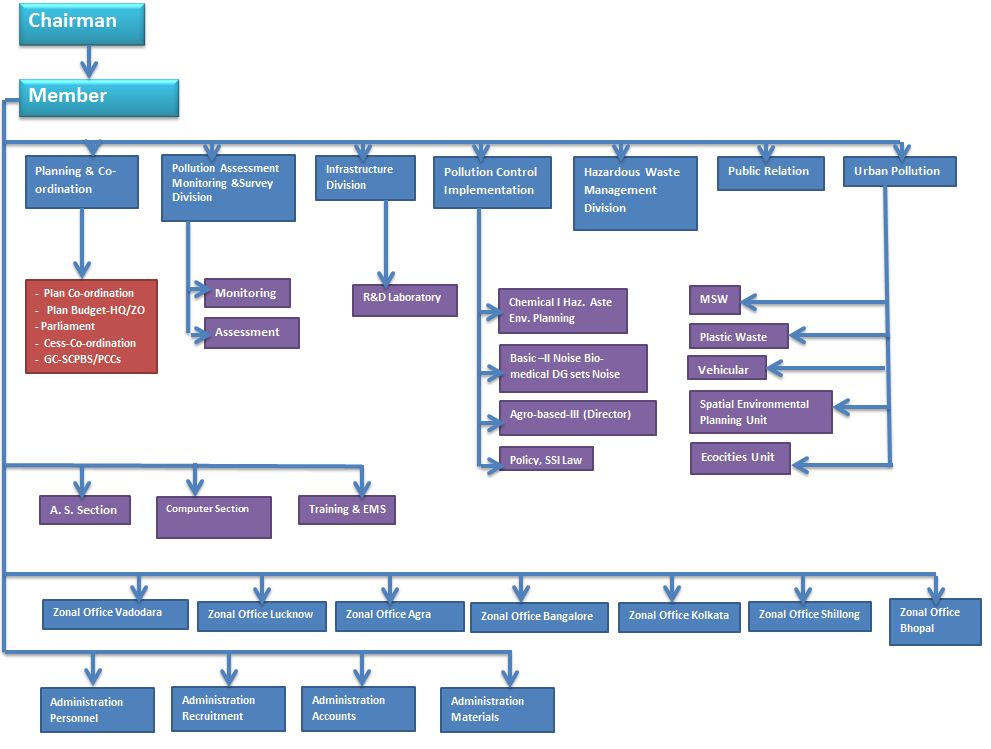
Organisational structure of CPCB

CPCB is led by its Chairman following by the Member Secretary. The CPCB performs its various functions through the following nine major project\ budget heads.

- Pollution assessment (survey and monitoring).
- R&D and laboratory management.
- Development of standards and guidelines for industry specific emissions and effluents standards
- Training
- Information database management and library
- Pollution control technology
- Pollution control enforcement
- Mass awareness and publications
- Hazard waste management

== Divisions of CPCB Head Office ==
CPCB head office is currently divided into 22 divisions. Each division have its own in charge and individual sets of goals.

- Pollution Control Planning Division (PCP).
- Pollution, Assessment, Monitoring & Survey (PAMS).
- Pollution Control Implementation Division -I (PCI-I).
- Pollution Control Implementation Division-II (PCI-II).
- Pollution Control Implementation Division - III (PCI-III).
- Urban Pollution Control Division (UPCD).
- Hazardous Waste Management Division (HWMD).
- Information Technology.
- Environmental Training Unit (ETU).
- LEGAL CELL.
- PR SECTION.
- AS SECTION.
- BUILDING SECTION.
- LIBRARY.
- HINDI SECTION.
- ADMINISTRATION (RECRUITMENT).
- PCI (SSI).
- ADMINISTRATION (PERSONNEL).
- MATERIAL.
- Accounts.

== Regional Directorates ==
CPCB has established 9 Regional Directorates catering to various States. Regional Directorates are field offices of CPCB and all the schemes are prepared at Head office are executed by them. Regional Directorates undertake field investigation and send reports on Water Quality Monitoring, Air Quality Monitoring, Industrial Inspection and other such related activities to the Head office for further action. Each Regional Directorate caters to a fixed number of states. The Regional Directorates are located at Bengaluru, Kolkata, Shillong, Bhopal, Lucknow, Vadodara, Chandigarh, Pune, Chennai and a Project Office at Agra.

== See also ==
- Environmental issues in India
- Indian Council of Forestry Research and Education
- Van Vigyan Kendra (VVK) Forest Science Centres
