= Aurangzeb's Sheesh Mahal =

Mughal garden in Delhi

Shalimar Bagh, Delhi
- Aurangzeb's Sheesh Mahal Garden
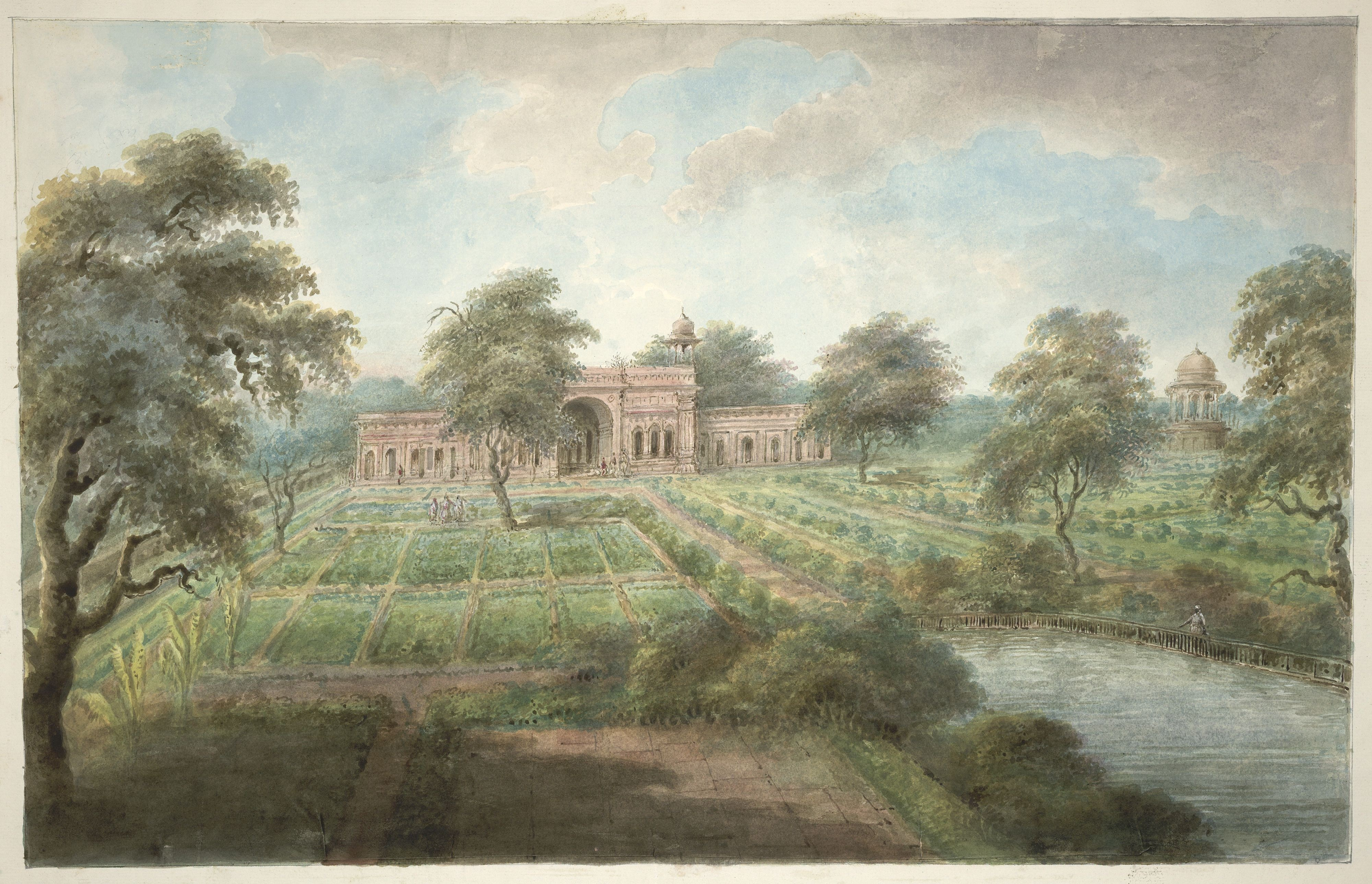
- Shalimar Gardens, Delhi in 1814, showing the majestic Parterre and Diwan Khana (visitors pavilion) in the background.
- Interactive map of Shalimar Bagh, Delhi
- Type: Mughal garden
- Location: Delhi, India
- Coordinates: 28°43′14″N 77°09′15″E
- Area: 6 hectares (15 acres)
- Opened: 1653
- Founder: Izz-un-Nissa wife of Mughal emperor Shah Jahan
- Owner: Archaeological Survey of India
- Operator: Archaeological Survey of India

Aurangzeb's Sheesh Mahal Garden is a Mughal garden located in Shalimar Bagh, Delhi, India. It was named as Aizzabad Bagh when the garden was laid by Izz-un-Nissa wife of Mughal emperor Shah Jahan in 1653 as a tribute and replica of Shalimar Bagh, Kashmir, laid by erstwhile Mughal emperor Jahangir in 1619, it houses shade trees, majestic parterre and structure such as the Sheesh Mahal and the garden pavilion. This palace, known as Aurangzeb's Sheesh Mahal, derives its distinctive name from its historical significance as the site of Emperor Aurangzeb's coronation in 1658. The name was given to honour his succession and commemorates a significant historic moment in Indian history and the emperor's enduring association with the site.

== History ==
In 1653, Izz-un-Nissa popularly known by the title "Akbarabadi Mahal" the third wife of Mughal emperor Shah Jahan commissioned the Aizzabad Bagh ("later renamed as Shalimar Bagh") in the then vicinity of Shahjahanabad (present-day Old Delhi). Within the Shalimar Bagh, Shah Jahan constructed "Sheesh Mahal" (crystal palace).

The Shalimar Bagh had witnessed events of historical significance such as in 1658 the coronation ceremony of Aurangzeb took place at the Sheesh Mahal. In 1738, Nadir Shah and his army encamped there on his route to Delhi. In 1803 Sir David Ochterlony a British Resident to the Mughal court at Delhi, selected Shalimar Bagh as his summer residence. During the Indian Rebellion of 1857 a battle was fought in very place when Delhi was sieged by the troops of East India Company.

In the Third Battle of Panipat, Ahmad Shah Durrani stayed there.

Sheesh Mahal reopened to the public on 2 July 2025 following restoration by the Archaeological Survey of India and the Delhi Development Authority. The work used traditional materials, including lime-surkhi mortar, lakhori bricks and organic binders such as jaggery, bael fruit and urad dal paste.

== Design ==
This pavilion was built by the Mughal emperor Shah Jahan. Like most Mughal gardens, it had channels of water culminating in ornate tanks and several fountains. The layout is designed in the mughal style of chaharbagh style. The pavilion has patches of wall-paintings that survived till date.

The Sheesh Mahal (crystal palace) is built on a high plinth facing the parterre with 25 fountains and the surrounding garden consisted of fruit orchards. The archways are circular, the central hall consists with a compartment at either end and an arched hall at the rear. Attached to the main building are vaulted rooms. Painting marks exist on the ceiling.

== Gallery ==
Shalimar Bagh gallery
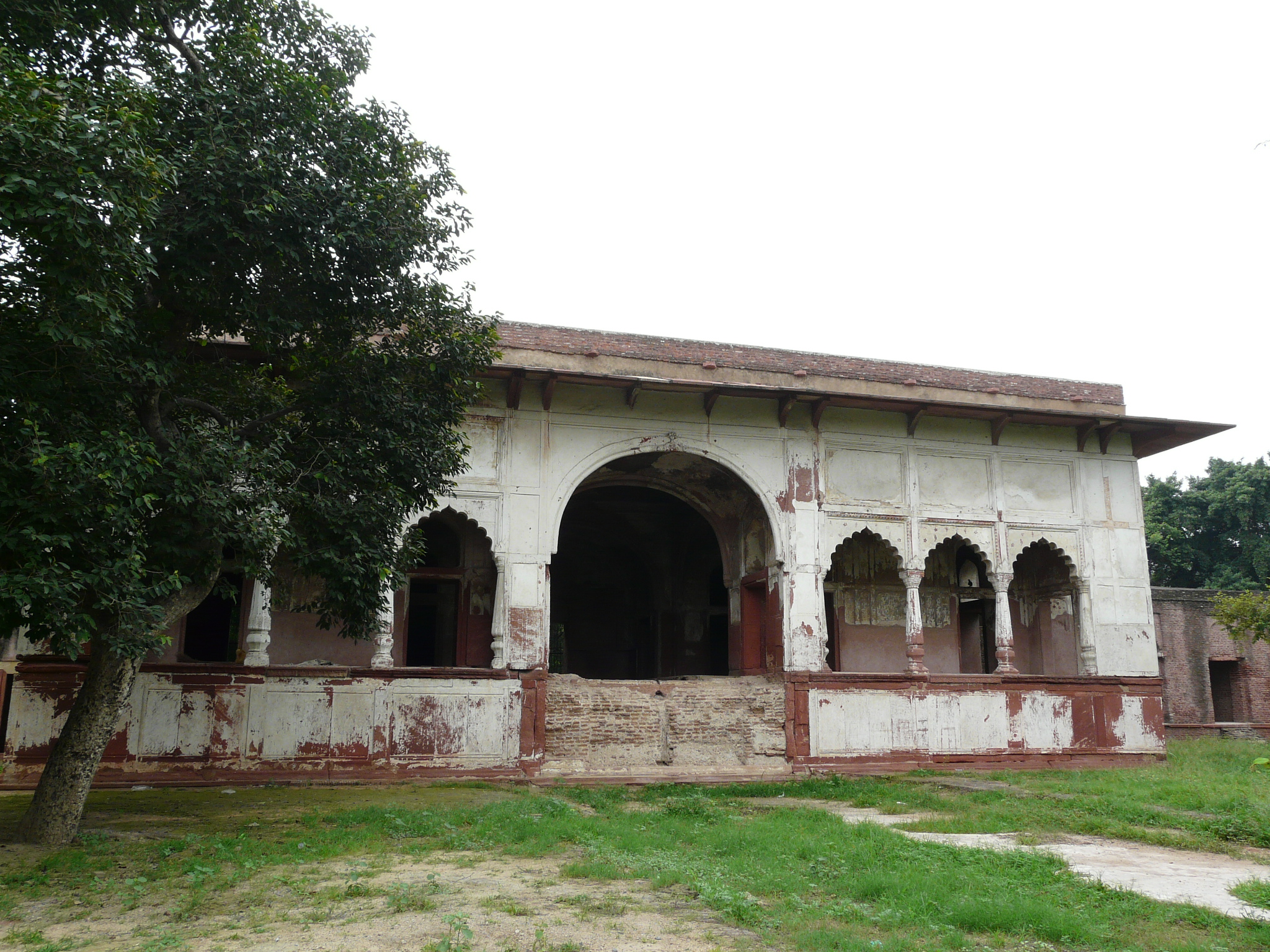
The Sheesh Mahal at Shalimar Bagh, Delhi.

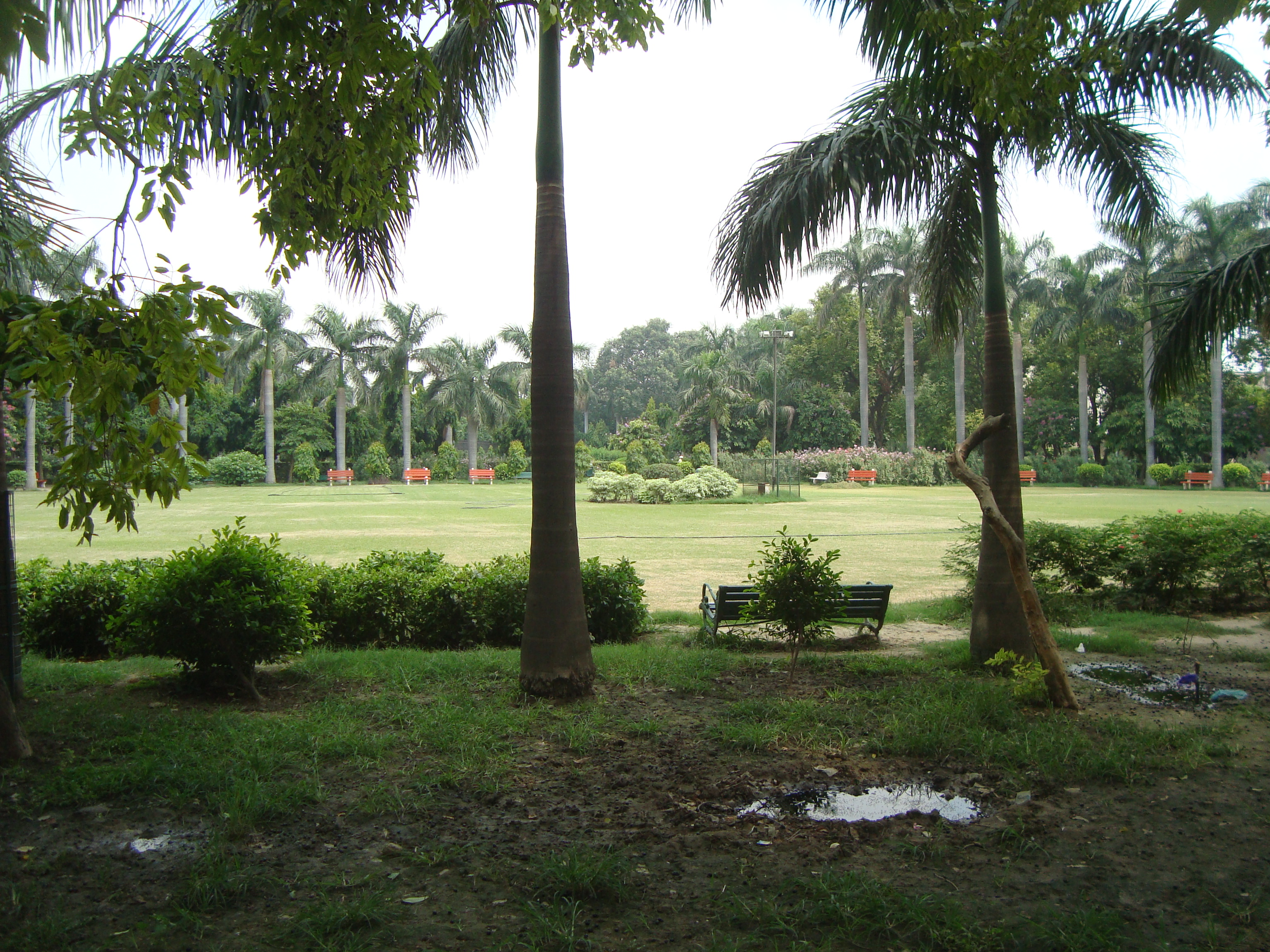
The Parterre and shade trees.

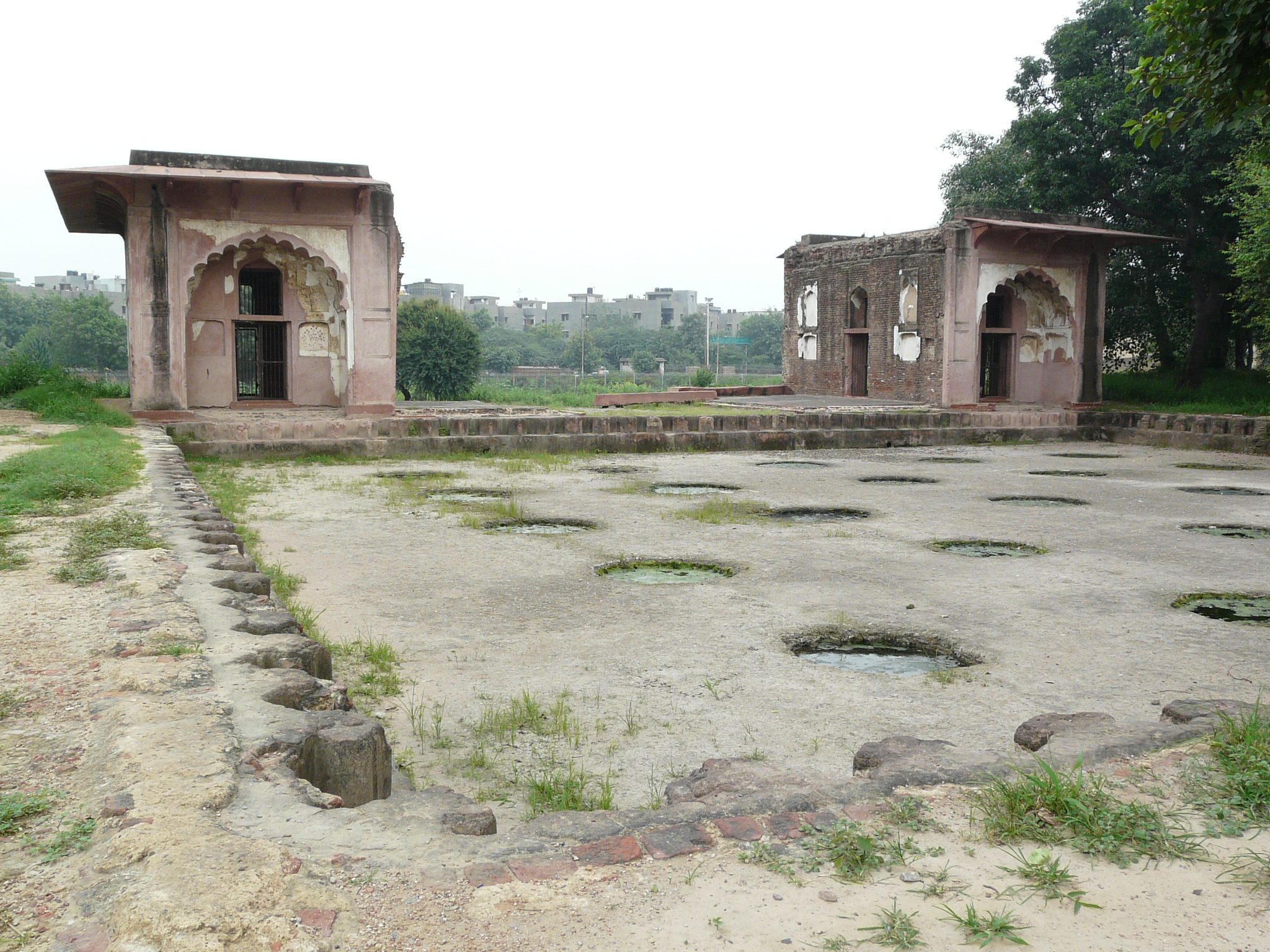
The garden pavilion.

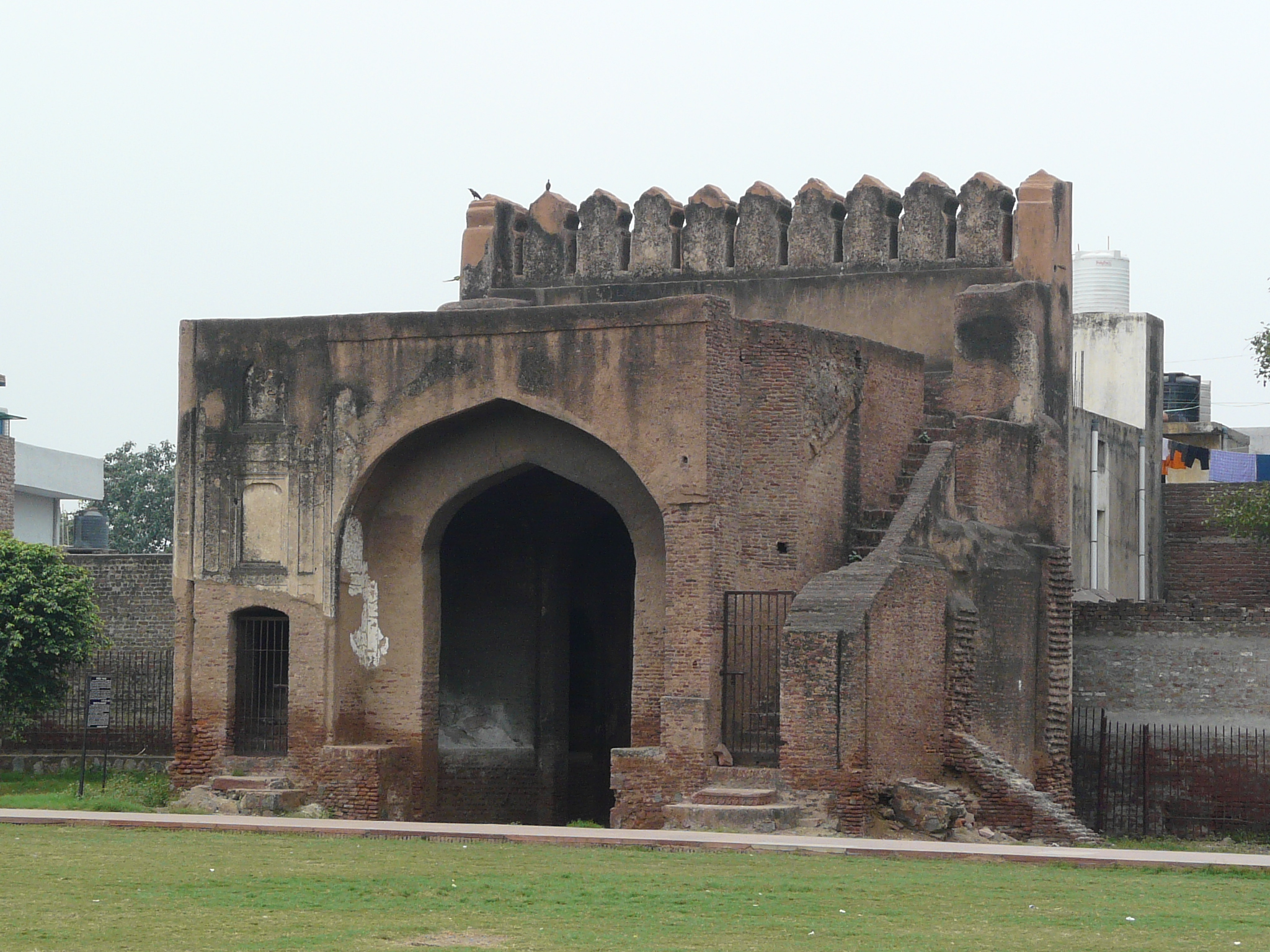
The Badli Sarai were Caravanserai in the vicinity of Shalimar Bagh a kilometre away at Badli-ki-Serai.

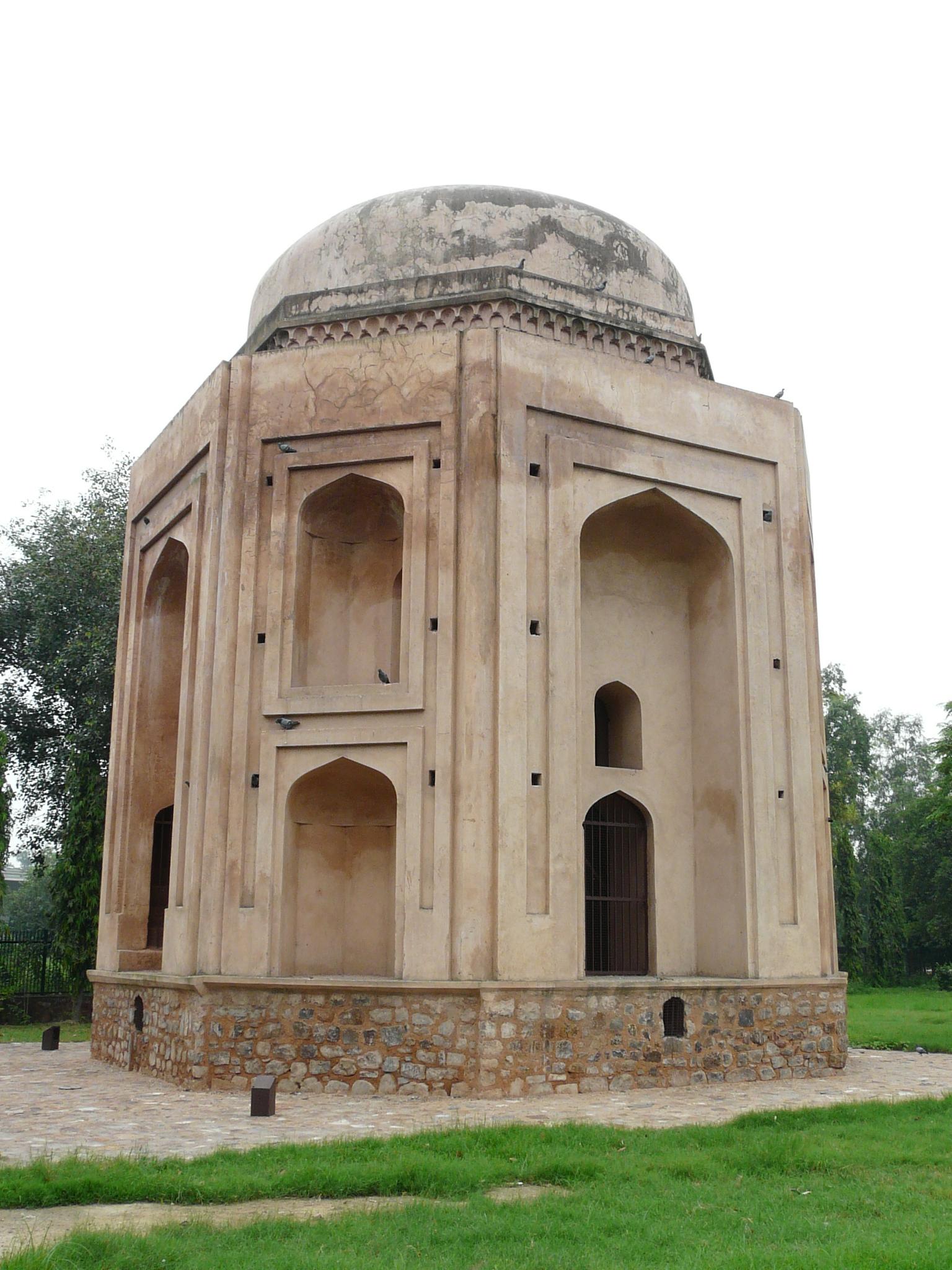
A tomb Maqbara-E-Paik (messenger's mausoleum) 2.5 kilometres away in the vicinity of Shalimar Bagh.

== See also ==
- List of parks in Delhi
