= Water (Prevention and Control of Pollution) Act, 1974 =

Act of the Parliament of India

Parliament of India
- Citation: Act No. 6 of 1974
- Territorial extent: The whole of India
- Enacted by: Parliament of India
- Enacted: 23 March 1974
- Status: In force

The Water (Prevention and Control of Pollution) Act, 1974 is an Act of the Parliament of India enacted to prevent and control water pollution across the country.The law provides for the establishment of Central and State Pollution Control Boards to regulate and monitor water quality. It was one of the earliest legislative efforts by the Government of India to address environmental pollution.

== Background ==
The Act was introduced in response to increasing pollution of rivers, lakes, and groundwater caused by industrial effluents, sewage, and agricultural runoff. It aimed to create a uniform legal framework across India for controlling water pollution.

- Section 3 & 4: Establishment of the Central Pollution Control Board (CPCB) and State Pollution Control Boards (SPCBs).
- Section 17: Powers and functions of SPCBs, including inspection, sampling, and enforcement.
- Section 24: Prohibits the disposal of polluting matter into water bodies without prior consent.
- Section 25 & 26: Requires industries and operations to obtain consent before discharging sewage or trade effluents.
- Section 33: Provides Boards with the authority to issue directions, including closure or regulation of industries.
- Sections 41–45: Provide penalties for non-compliance, obstruction, and environmental damage.
