= Uttarakhand Gazette =

Uttarakhand Gazette उत्तराखण्ड राजपत्र
- Type: Government gazette
- Format: Booklet, online edition
- Owner: Government of Uttarakhand
- Publisher: Department of Information
- Founded: November 9, 2000; 25 years ago
- Language: English and Hindi
- Headquarters: Roorkee, Uttarakhand
- Country: India
- Website: www.gazettes.uk.gov.in

Uttarakhand Gazette is a public journal of the Government of Uttarakhand, published weekly by the Department of Information. As a public journal, the Gazette prints official notices from the government. The gazette is printed by the Government of Uttarakhand Press at Roorkee.

The Uttarakhand Gazette publishes all the texts of the new laws and government decisions in Uttarakhand. Uttarakhand Gazette notification is the official authentication of the state government.

== See also ==
- Gazette
- The Gazette of India
- Constitution of India
