= Uttarakhand Power Corporation Limited =

Indian energy company

- Type: Public Sector Undertakings
- Industry: Electric power
- Founded: 2000; 26 years ago
- Headquarters: Dehradun, India
- Area served: Uttarakhand
- Key people: Pushkar Singh Dhami, Minister of Power; Anand Bardhan ,(Chairman)
- Products: Transmission; Distribution
- Owner: Ministry of Power, Government of Uttarakhand
- Website: www.upcl.org

Uttarakhand Power Corporation Limited (UPCL) is the company responsible for electricity transmission and distribution within the Indian state of Uttarakhand. The incumbent chairman is Anand Bardhan .As the sole distributor of power in Uttarakhand, it manages Uttarakhand's 2600 MW daily demand.
