= Mussoorie Dehradun Development Authority =

Mussoorie Dehradun Development Authority (MDDA)
- Founded: 1984
- Headquarters: Dehradun
- Area served: Uttarakhand
- Owner: Government of Uttarakhand
- Website: www.mddaonline.in

The Mussoorie Dehradun Development Authority (MDDA) is a state-run parastatal which was established in 1984 with the objective of planning and development of the city. Mussoorie Dehradun Development area includes Dehradun Urban Agglomeration, Mussoorie Municipal area and its surrounding 185 Revenue Villages of Dehradun District.

== MDDA receives ISO Certificate ==
The Chief Minister handed out certificates given by ISO to MDDA for its working and work quality.Read More...

== Master Plans ==
The MDDA Master Plan was formed to ensure an organised and structured development of haphazard growth of Dehradun. The MDDA Masterplan was revised on 19 November 2008 and then amended on 28 November 2013 to form the Master Plan 2025.

== Housing ==
The development of Housing projects by MDDA commenced in 1984 with the construction of houses and providing the basic amenities like electricity, water supply, sewage disposal, and other infrastructure facilities. The new projects undertaken instigate with recognition of project sites, public announcement about the new MDDA housing schemes]in various categories through newspapers and other media advertisements, formal acceptance of the applications, a transparent draw (lottery)system for short-listing of the applicants and finally allotment of the property.

Some popular MDDA Housing Schemes include ISBT (HIG/MIG/LIG/EWS) Housing Scheme, Transport Nagar Phase 2 Housing Scheme, MIG Extension Housing Scheme and Aalayam Housing Scheme that offers home registration along with the property purchase. Also, there is a provision in schemes that offers house registrations for the EWS (Economically Weaker Section) category that allotted flats to the SC/ST registrants.

== Horticulture works ==
Mussoorie Dehradun Development Authority acquires land for development in Dehradun and Mussoorie. MDDA land development also includes providing a lush greenbelt and forest area for a clean and healthy environment by developing regional parks, neighborhood parks, district parks, play fields, and sports complexes. In the hinterlands of the city lies the MDDA Park peacefully snuggled in the Kairwaan village at Rajpur.Read More...

== Achievements ==
INTER STATE BUS TERMINAL-Inter State Bus Terminal was launched by CM, Uttarakhand and is fully operative, is first in India on BOT basis.

MULTI STOREY CAR PARKING-Multi storey car parking cum shopping complex near Clock Tower, 6793 sqmt. Land taken from RFC.

== See also ==
- Urban Development Directorate (Uttarakhand)
- Haridwar Roorkee Development Authority
