= 2001 Odisha Assembly attack =

Terrorist incident in Bhubaneshwar, India

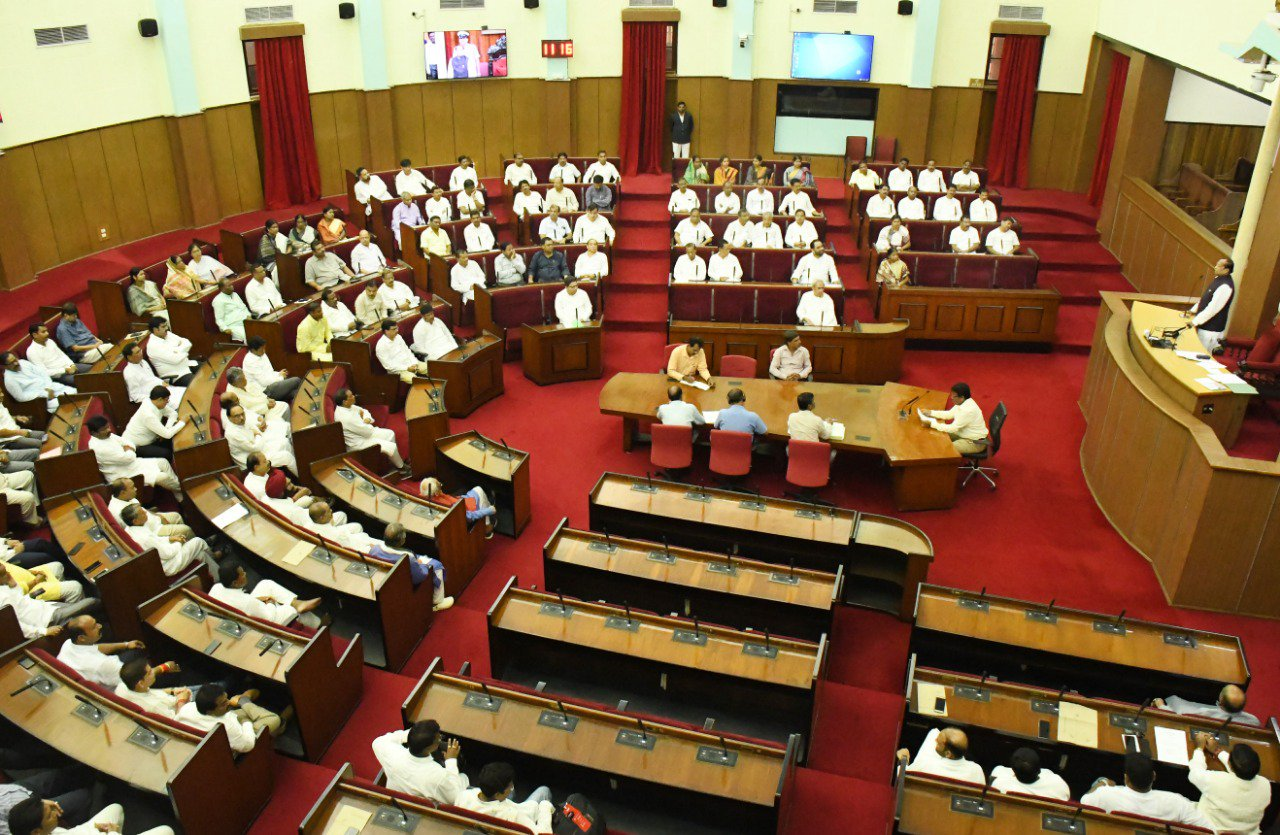
- Location: Bhubaneshwar, India
- Date: 16 December 2001 (UTC+05:30)
- Target: Orissa Assembly building
- Attack type: rioting, arson, assault and damaging government property.
- Injuries: Many, including Biju Janata Dal legislator Ashok Panigrahi and some policemen.

The 2001 Odisha Assembly attack was a high-profile attack by Bajrang Dal, Vishwa Hindu Parishad and Durga Vahini.

== Background ==
On 16 December 2001, the activists of Bajrang Dal, Vishwa Hindu Parishad and Durga Vahini who had been on a protest about 300 metres from the Assembly building, surged forth minutes after the House was adjourned for lunch. The protest was held to demand the handing over of the land in Ayodhya to the Ramjanmabhoomi Nyas for the construction of Hindu temple, the release of Giriraj Kishore and the withdrawal of "anti-VHP" comments made by some MLAs in the Orissa Assembly one day earlier.

== Attack ==
The activists of these organisations stormed the Odisha Assembly building through the main entrance. Sporting saffron headbands and chanting "Jai Sriram" and "Atal Behari Vajpayee zindabad", the trident- lathi-wielding men rushed inside, indulging in vandalism for over 30 minutes, beating every individual they came across, including Biju Janata Dal legislator Ashok Panigrahi and several journalists and policemen. They broke glass doors and window panes, smashed flowerpots placed along the corridors, and ransacked the library and the chambers of ministers. The security personnel posted in and around the high-security complex failed to control the mob.

== Aftermath ==
The day after the unprecedented attack on the Assembly the State government suspended 20 police personnel for dereliction of duty. Sixty-seven people, including Bipin Bihari Rath, Pratap Sarangi, who was the then State unit president of the Bajrang Dal, and nine women were arrested on charges of rioting, arson, assault and damaging government property. The attack on the Assembly has further weakened the BJD-BJP coalition arrangement in Odisha which finally ended in 2009.

== Political reactions ==
The Congress and Communists demanded banning of Bajrang Dal and Vishwa Hindu Parishad. From the Sangh Parivar whose frontal organisations are alleged to be involved in the incident, Balbir K Punj, BJP MP, wrote on the website of the Hindu Vivek Kendra, a self-claimed resource center for the promotion of Hindutva, that vandalism, even though condemnable, could not be equated with terrorism. He asserted that 16 December attack on Odisha Assembly should not be equated with the 13 December attack as asserted by the Congress and the Marxists. He cited two similar incidents of Odisha Assembly attacks in the past – one by agitating students with Leftist leaning forcing into the State Assembly in 1964 when Biren Mitra headed a Congress Government in the state and another in 1978 when during the Chief Ministership of Nilamani Routray of Janata Party the Congress activists stormed the assembly prompted by the arrest of Indira Gandhi.

== See also ==
- List of attacks on legislatures
