= Hindu nationalism =

Nationalism based on Hindu religion

Bhagwa Dhwaj, or the saffron flag, is widely used as the symbol of Hindu nationalism.

Hindu nationalism has been collectively referred to as the expression of political thought, based on the native social and cultural traditions of the Indian subcontinent. It is better described as seeking a "Hindu polity".

The native thought streams became highly relevant in Indian history when they helped form a distinctive identity about the Indian polity and provided a basis for questioning colonialism. These also inspired Indian nationalists during the independence movement based on armed struggle, coercive politics, and non-violent protests. They also influenced social reform movements and economic thinking in India.

Today, Hindutva (meaning 'Hinduness') is the dominant form of Hindu nationalist politics in India. As a political ideology, the term Hindutva was articulated by Vinayak Damodar Savarkar in 1923. Hindutva is championed by the ruling Bharatiya Janata Party (BJP), the Hindutva paramilitary organisation Rashtriya Swayamsevak Sangh (RSS), the Vishva Hindu Parishad (VHP), and other organisations in an ecosystem called the Sangh Parivar.

== Evolution of ideological terminology and influences ==
In the first half of the 20th century, factions of Indian National Congress continued to be identified with "Hindu politics" and ideas of a Hindu nation. The word "Hindu", throughout history, had been used as an inclusive description that lacked a definition and was used to refer to the native traditions and people of India. It was only in the late 18th century that the word "Hindu" came to be used extensively with religious connotation, while still being used as a synecdoche describing the indigenous traditions. Hindu nationalist ideologies and political languages were very diverse both linguistically and socially. Since Hinduism does not represent an identifiable religious group, terms such as 'Hindu nationalism', and 'Hindu', are considered problematic in the case of religious and nationalism discourse. As Hindus were identifiable as a homogeneous community, some individual Congress leaders were able to induce a symbolism with "Hindu" meaning inside the general stance of secular nationalism.

The diversity of Indian cultural groups and moderate positions of Hindu nationalism have sometimes made it regarded as cultural nationalism rather than a religious one.

Shivaji and his conquests are said to have served basis for Hindu nationalism. Hindutva creator Vinayak Damodar Savarkar writes that Shivaji had 'electrified' minds of the Hindus all over India by defeating the forces of the Mughals.

== Nepali Hindu nationalism and practices ==
=== Hinduisation policy of the Gorkhali monarch ===
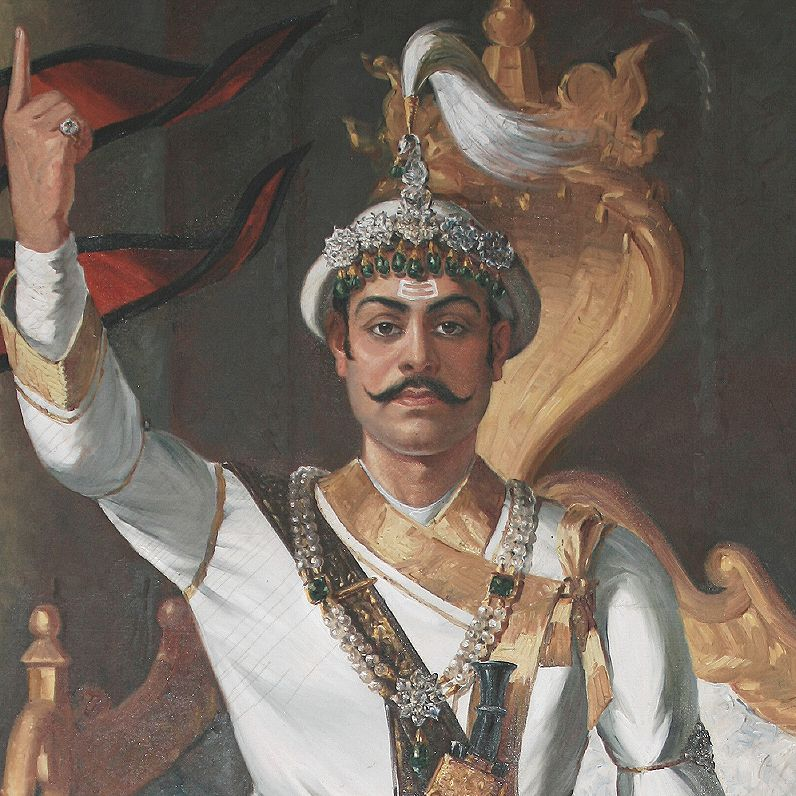
Maharajadhiraja Prithvi Narayan Shah (1723–1775), King of Nepal, propagated the ideals of the Hindu text Dharmashastra as the ruling ideology.

Maharajadhiraja Prithvi Narayan Shah proclaimed the newly unified Kingdom of Nepal as Asal Hindustan ("Real Land of Hindus") because North India was ruled by the Islamic Mughal rulers. The proclamation was made to enforce the Hindu social code Dharmaśāstra over his reign and refer to his country as being inhabitable for Hindus. He also referred to the rest of Northern India as Mughlan (Country of Mughals) and called the region infiltrated by Muslim foreigners. After the Gorkhali conquest of the Kathmandu Valley, King Prithvi Narayan Shah expelled Christian Capuchin missionaries from Patan and renamed Nepal as Asali Hindustan (the real land of Hindus). The Tagadharis enjoyed a privileged status in the Nepalese capital and they were also given greater access to the authorities after these events. Subsequently, Hinduisation became the main policy of the Kingdom of Nepal. Prof. Harka Gurung speculates that the presence of Islamic Mughal rule and Christian British rule in India compelled the foundation of Hindu Nationalism in the Kingdom of Nepal, to build a haven for Hindus there.

==== Ideals of the Bharadari government ====
The policies of the old Bharadari governments of the Gorkha Kingdom were derived from ancient Hindu texts such as the Dharmashastra The King was considered an incarnation of Vishnu and was the chief authority over legislative, judiciary and executive functions. The judiciary functions were decided based on the principles of Hindu Dharma codes of conduct. The king had full rights to expel any person who offended the country and also to pardon the offenders and grant their return to the country. The government in practicality was not an absolute monarchy due to the dominance of Nepalese political clans such as the Pande family and the Thapa family, making the Shah monarch a puppet ruler. These basic Hindu templates provide the evidence that Nepal was administered as a Hindu state.

==== Hindu civil code and legal regulations ====
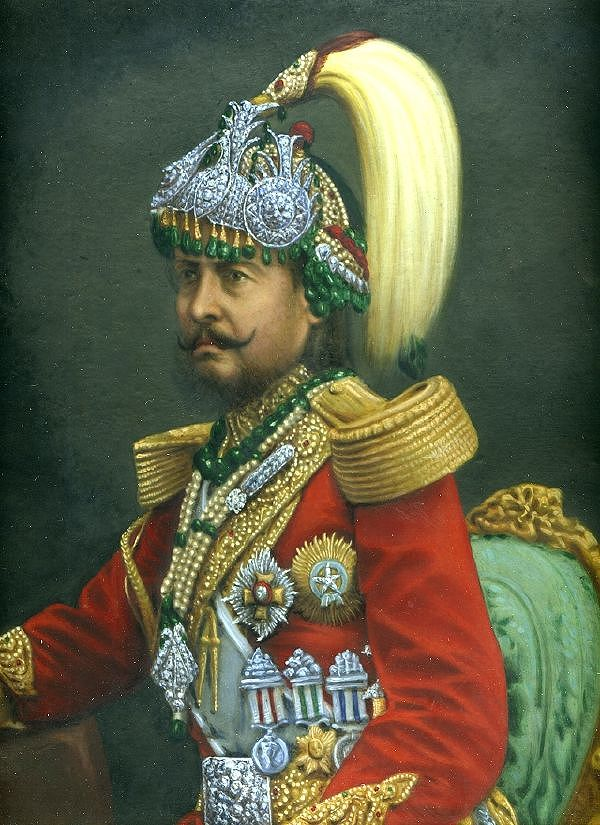
Jung Bahadur Kunwar Rana commissioned the first civil code Muluki Ain in 1854 AD based on traditional Hindu law and prioritised Tagadhari castes before Matwalis and Dalits.

The Nepali civil code, Muluki Ain, was commissioned by Jung Bahadur Rana after his European tour and enacted in 1854. It was rooted in traditional Hindu Law and codified social practices for several centuries in Nepal. The law also comprised Prāyaścitta (avoidance and removal of sin) and Ācāra (the customary law of different communities). It was an attempt to include the entire Hindu as well as the non-Hindu population of Nepal of that time into a single hierarchic civic code from the perspective of the Khas rulers. The Nepalese jati arrangement in terms of Hindu Varnashrama takes the Tagadhari to be the highest in the hierarchy. The ethnolinguistic group of people of Tamang, Sherpa and Tharu origin were tagged under the title Matwali ("Liquor Drinkers"), while those of Khas, Newari and Terai origin were termed Tagadhari ("Wearers of the Sacred Thread"). The Tagadhari castes could not be enslaved following any criminal punishment unless they had been expelled from the caste. The main broad caste categories in Nepal are Tagadharis (sacred thread bearers), Matwalis (liquor drinkers) and Dalits (or untouchables).

== Modern age and the Hindu Renaissance in the 19th century ==
Many Hindu reform movements originated in the nineteenth century. These movements led to fresh interpretations of the ancient scriptures of Upanishads and Vedanta and also emphasised on social reform. The marked feature of these movements was that they countered the notion of the superiority of Western culture during the colonial era. This led to the upsurge of patriotic ideas that formed the cultural and ideological basis for the independence movement in Colonial India.

=== Brahmo Samaj ===
The Brahmo Samaj was started by a Bengali scholar, Ram Mohan Roy in 1828. Ram Mohan Roy endeavoured to create from the ancient Upanishadic texts, a vision of rationalist 'modern' India. Socially, he criticised the ongoing superstitions, and believed in a monotheistic Vedic religion. His major emphasis was social reform. He fought against Caste discrimination and advocated equal rights for women. Although the Brahmos found favourable responses from the British government and Westernised Indians, they were largely isolated from the larger Hindu society due to their intellectual Vedantic and Unitarian views. However their efforts to systematise Hindu spirituality based on rational and logical interpretation of the ancient Indian texts would be carried forward by other movements in Bengal and across India.

=== Arya Samaj ===
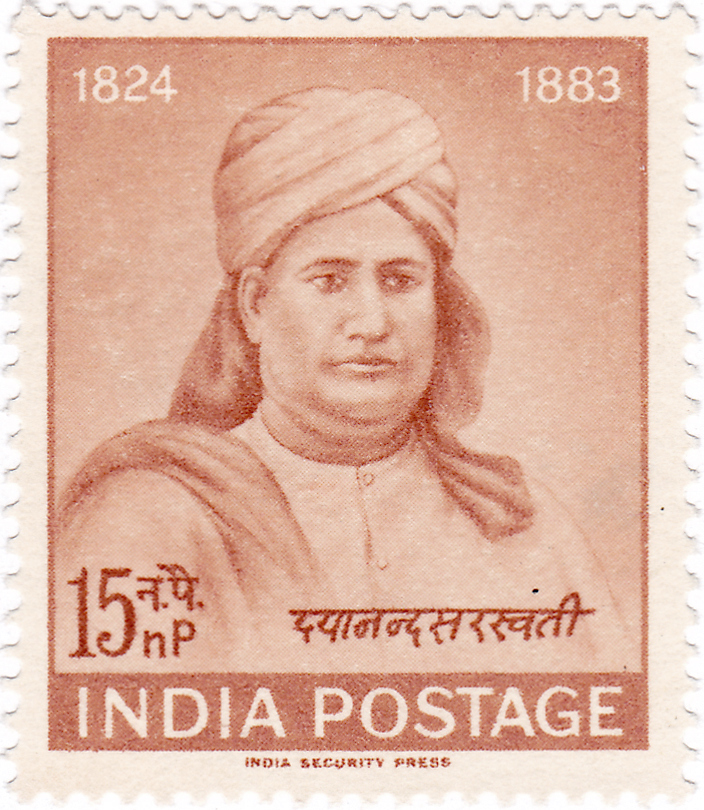
Maharishi Dayananda Saraswati, founder of the Arya Samaj, on a 1962 stamp of India

Arya Samaj is considered one of the overarching Hindu renaissance movements of the late nineteenth century. Swami Dayananda, the founder of Arya Samaj, rejected idolatry, caste restriction and untouchability, child marriage and advocated equal status and opportunities for women. He opposed "Brahmanism" (which he believed had led to the corruption of the knowledge of Vedas) as much as he opposed Christianity and Islam. Although Arya Samaj was often considered as a social movement, many revolutionaries and political leaders of the Indian Independence movement like Ramprasad Bismil, Bhagat Singh, Shyamji Krishnavarma, Bhai Paramanand and Lala Lajpat Rai were inspired by it.

=== Swami Vivekananda ===
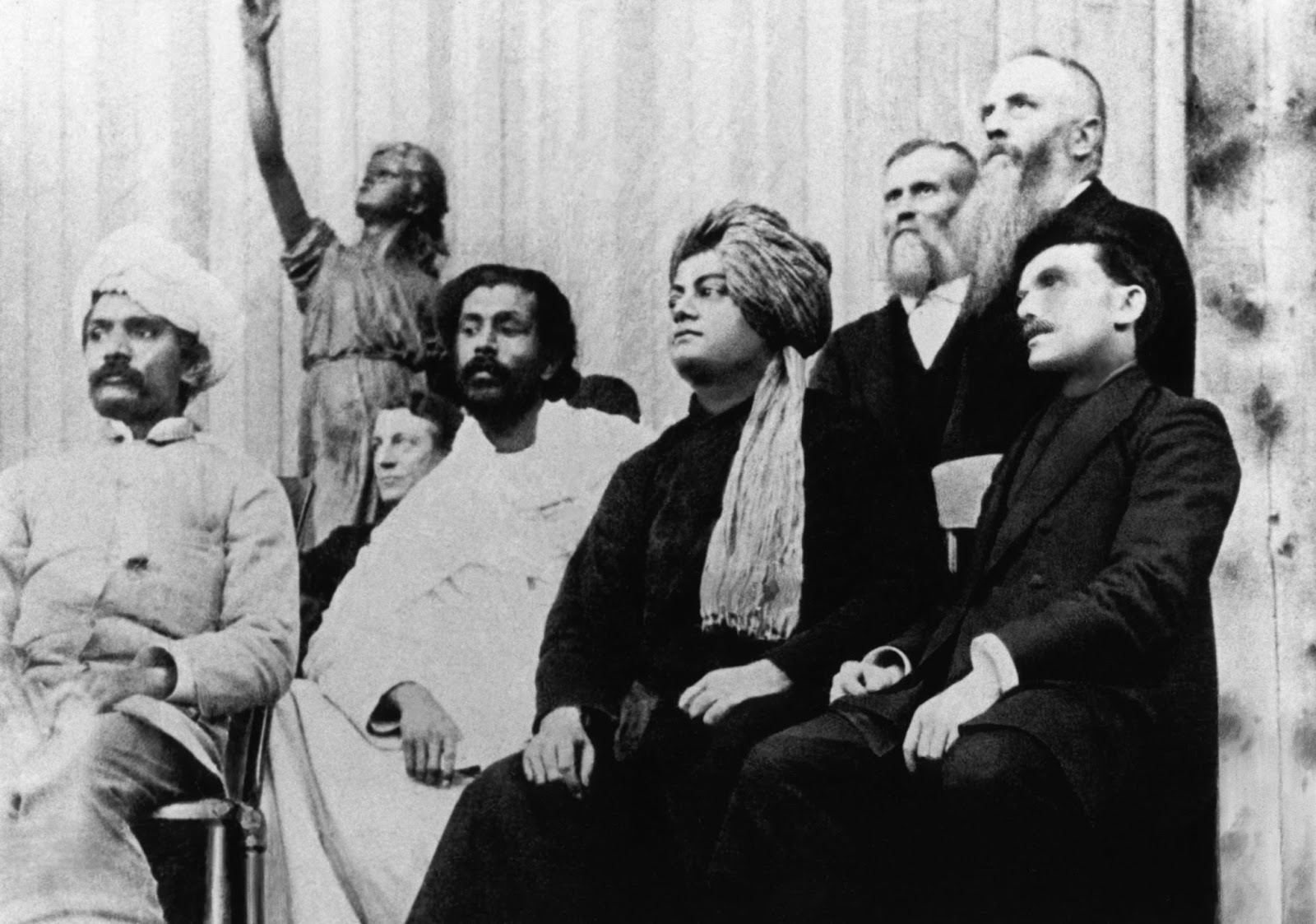
Swami Vivekananda on the Platform of the Parliament of the World's Religions

Another 19th-century Hindu reformer was Swami Vivekananda. Vivekananda as a student was educated in contemporary Western thought. He joined Brahmo Samaj briefly before meeting Ramakrishna, who was a priest in the temple of the goddess Kali in Calcutta and who was to become his guru. Under the influence of Orientalism, Perennialism and Universalism, Vivekananda re-interpreted Advaita Vedanta, presenting it as the essence of Hindu spirituality, and the development of human's religiosity. This project started with Ram Mohan Roy of Brahmo Samaj, who collaborated with the Unitarian Church, and propagated a strict monotheism. This reinterpretation produced neo-Vedanta, in which Advaita Vedanta was combined with disciplines such as yoga and the concept of social service to attain perfection from the ascetic traditions in what Vivekananda called the "practical Vedanta". The practical side essentially included participation in social reform.

He made Hindu spirituality, intellectually available to the Westernised audience. His famous speech in the Parliament of the World's Religions at Chicago on 11 September 1893, followed a huge reception of his thought in the West and made him a well-known figure in the West and subsequently in India too. His influence can still be recognised in popular Western spirituality, such as nondualism, New Age and the veneration of Ramana Maharshi.

A major element of Vivekananda's message was nationalism. He saw his effort very much in terms of a revitalisation of the Hindu nation, which carried Hindu spirituality and which could counter Western materialism. The notions of the superiority of Western culture against the culture of India, were to be questioned based on Hindu spirituality. It also became a main inspiration for Hindu nationalism today. "Vivekananda is like Gita for the RSS" was the lifelong pet sentence of one of the most revered leaders of the Rashtriya Swayamsevak Sangh (RSS), Babasaheb Apte. Some historians have observed that this helped the nascent Independence movement with a distinct national identity and kept it from being the simple derivative function of European nationalism.

== Shaping of Hindu polity and nationalism in the 20th century ==
=== Sri Aurobindo ===
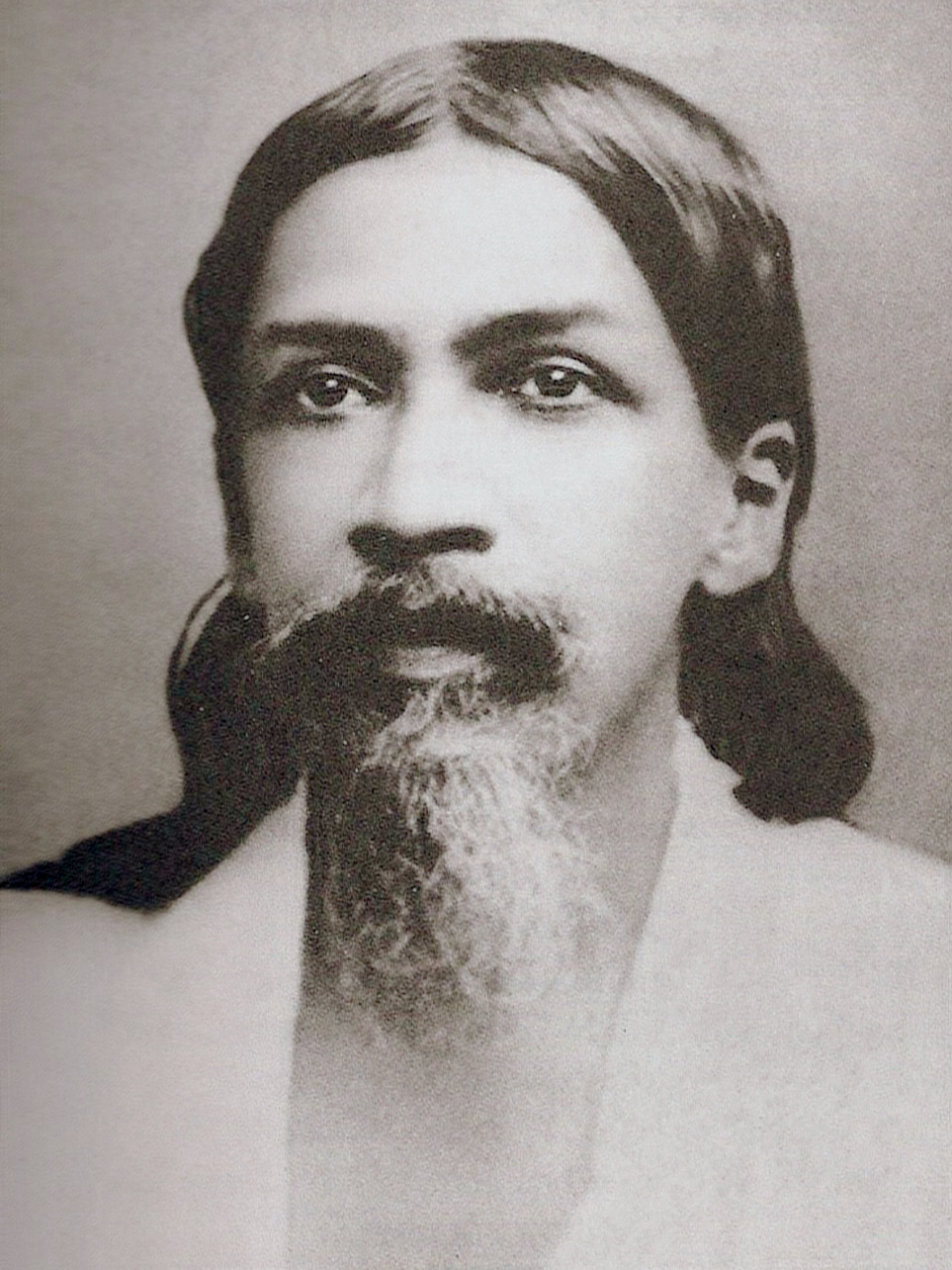
Sri Aurobindo was an Indian philosopher, yogi, guru, poet, and nationalist.

Sri Aurobindo was a nationalist and one of the first to embrace the idea of complete political independence for India. He was inspired by the writings of Swami Vivekananda and the novels of Bankim Chandra Chattopadhyay. He "based his claim for freedom for India on the inherent right to freedom, not on any charge of misgovernment or oppression". He believed that the primary requisite for national progress, national reform, is the free habit of free and healthy national thought and action and that it was impossible in a state of servitude. He was part of the Anushilan Samiti, a revolutionary group working towards the goal of Indian independence In his brief political career spanning only four years, he led a delegation from Bengal to the Indian National Congress session of 1907 and contributed to the revolutionary newspaper Bande Mataram.

In his famous Uttarpara Speech, he outlined the essence and the goal of India's nationalist movement thus:

I say no longer that nationalism is a creed, a religion, a faith; I say that it is the Sanatan Dharma which for us is nationalism. This Hindu nation was born with the Sanatan Dharma, with it, it moves and with it, it grows. When the Sanatan Dharma declines, then the nation declines, and if the Sanatan Dharma were capable of perishing, with the Sanatan Dharma it would perish.

In the same speech, he also gave a comprehensive perspective of Hinduism, which is at variance with the geocentric view developed by the later day Hindu nationalist ideologues such as Veer Savarkar and Deendayal Upadhyay:

But what is the Hindu religion? What is this religion which we call Sanatan, eternal? It is the Hindu religion only because the Hindu nation has kept it, after all, in this Peninsula it grew up in the seclusion of the sea and the Himalayas, because in this sacred and ancient land it was given as a charge to the Aryan race to preserve through the ages. But it is not circumscribed by the confines of a single country, it does not belong peculiarly and forever to a bounded part of the world. That which we call the Hindu religion is the eternal religion, because it is the universal religion which embraces all others. If a religion is not universal, it cannot be eternal. A narrow religion, a sectarian religion, an exclusive religion can live only for a limited time and a limited purpose. This is the one religion that can triumph over materialism by including and anticipating the discoveries of science and the speculations of philosophy.

In 1910, he withdrew from political life and spent his remaining life doing spiritual exercises and writing. But his works kept inspiring revolutionaries and struggles for independence, including the famous Chittagong Uprising. Both Swami Vivekananda and Sri Aurobindo are credited with having founded the basis for a vision of freedom and glory for India in the spirituality and heritage of Hinduism.

== Independence movement ==
In 1924, Mahatma Gandhi wrote:

This [Christian] proselytization will mean no peace in the world. Conversions are harmful to India. If I had the power and could legislate I should certainly stop all proselytizing ... It pains me to have to say that the Christian missionaries as a body, with honorable exceptions, have actively supported a system which has impoverished, enervated and demoralized a people considered to be among the gentlest and most civilized on earth.

The influence of the Hindu renaissance movements was such that by the turn of the 20th century, there was a confluence of ideas of Hindu cultural nationalism with the ideas of Indian nationalism. Both could be spoken synonymously even by tendencies that were seemingly opposed to sectarian communalism and Hindu majoritism. The Hindu renaissance movements held considerable influence over the revolutionary movements against British rule and formed the philosophical basis for the struggles and political movements that originated in the first decade of the twentieth century.

=== Revolutionary movements ===
==== Anushilan Samiti and Jugantar ====
Anushilan Samiti was one of the prominent revolutionary movements in India in the early part of the twentieth century. It was started as a cultural society in 1902, by Aurobindo and the followers of Bankim Chandra to propagate the teachings of the Bhagavad Gita. But soon the Samiti had its goal to overthrow British colonial rule in India Various branches of the Samiti sprung across India in the guise of suburban fitness clubs but secretly imparted arms training to its members with the implicit aim of using them against the British colonial administration.

On 30 April 1908 at Muzaffarpur, two revolutionaries, Khudiram Bose and Prafulla Chaki, threw bombs at a British convoy aimed at British officer Kingsford. Both were arrested trying to flee. Aurobindo was also arrested on 2 May 1908 and sent to Alipore Jail. The report sent from Andrew Fraser, the then Lt Governor of Bengal to Lord Minto in England declared that although Sri Aurobindo came to Calcutta in 1906 as a Professor at the National College, "he has ever since been the principal advisor of the revolutionary party. It is of utmost importance to arrest his potential for mischief, for he is the prime mover and can easily set tools, one to replace another". But charges against Aurobindo were never proved and he was acquitted. Many members of the group faced charges and were transported and imprisoned for life. Others went into hiding.

In 1910, when, Aurobindo withdrew from political life and decided to live a life of renounciate, the Anushilan Samiti declined. One of the revolutionaries, Bagha Jatin, who managed to escape the trial started a group which would be called Jugantar. Jugantar continued with its armed struggle against the colonial government, but the arrests of its key members and subsequent trials weakened its influence. Many of its members were imprisoned for life in the notorious Andaman Cellular jail.

==== India House ====
A revolutionary movement was started by Shyamji Krishnavarma, a Sanskritist and an Arya Samajist, in London, under the name of India House in 1905. The brain behind this movement was said to be Vinayak Damodar Savarkar. Krishnaverma also published a monthly "Indian Sociologist", where the idea of an armed struggle against the British colonial government was openly espoused. The movement had become well known for its activities in the Indian expatriates in London. When Gandhi visited London in 1909, he shared a platform with the revolutionaries where both the parties politely agreed to disagree, on the question of adopting a violent struggle and whether Ramayana justified such violence. Gandhi, while admiring the "patriotism" of the young revolutionaries, had "dissented vociferously" from their "violent blueprints" for social change. In turn, the revolutionaries disliked his adherence to constitutionalism and his close contacts with moderate leaders of the Indian National Congress. Moreover, they considered his method of "passive resistance" effeminate and humiliating.

The India House was soon to face closure following the assassination of William Hutt Curzon Wyllie by the revolutionary Madan Lal Dhingra, who was close to India House. Savarkar also faced charges and was transported. Shyamji Krishna Varma fled to Paris. India House gave formative support to ideas that were later formulated by Savarkar in his book named 'Hindutva'. Hindutva was to gain relevance in the run-up to the Indian Independence and form the core ideology of the political party Hindu Mahasabha, of which Savarkar became president in 1937. It also formed the key ideology, under the euphemistic relabelling Rashtriyatva (nationalism), for the Rashtriya Swayamsevak Sangh founded in 1925, and of the Bharatiya Jana Sangh (the present-day ruling Bharatiya Janata Party) under another euphemistic relabelling Bharatiyata (Indianness).

=== Indian National Congress ===
==== Lal-Bal-Pal ====
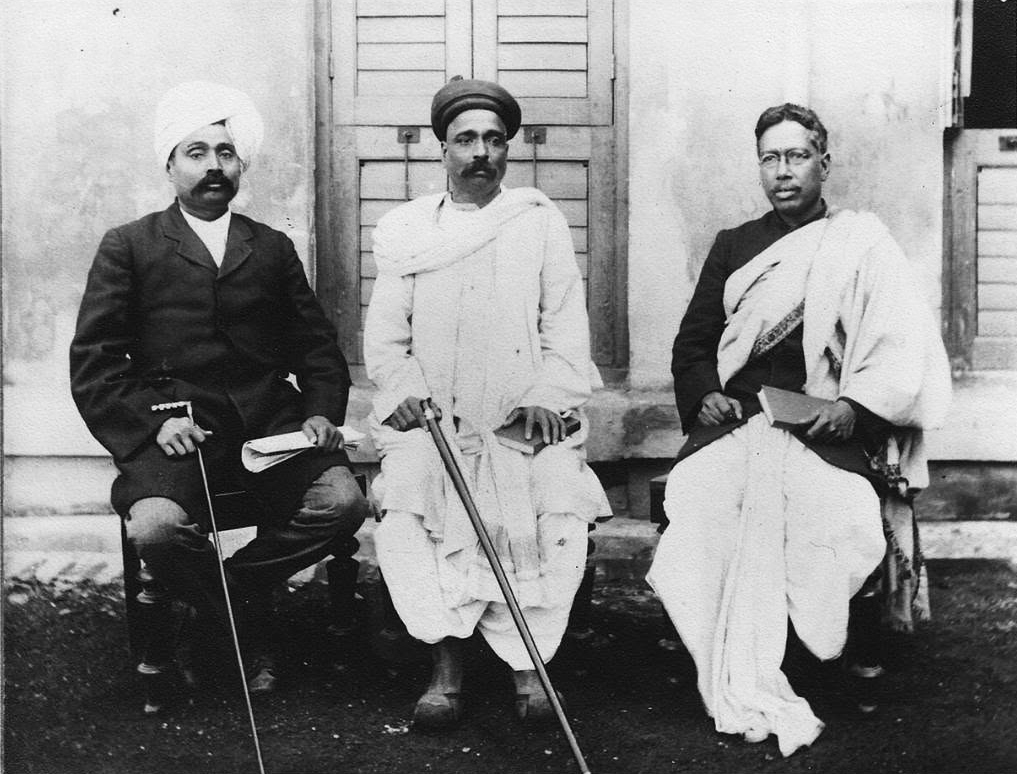
A rare photograph of Lala Lajpat Rai of Punjab, Bal Gangadhar Tilak of Maharashtra, and Bipin Chandra Pal of Bengal. The triumvirate was popularly known as Lal Bal Pal, who changed the political discourse of the Indian independence movement.

"Lal-Bal-Pal" is the phrase that is used to refer to the three nationalist leaders Lala Lajpat Rai, Bal Gangadhar Tilak and Bipin Chandra Pal who held sway over the Indian Nationalist movement and the independence struggle in the early parts of twentieth century.

Lala Lajpat Rai belonged to the northern province of Punjab. He was influenced greatly by the Arya Samaj and was part of the Hindu reform movement. He joined the Indian National Congress in 1888 and became a prominent figure in the Indian Independence Movement. He started numerous educational institutions. The National College at Lahore started by him became the centre for revolutionary ideas and was the college where revolutionaries like Bhagat Singh studied. While leading a procession against the Simon Commission, he was fatally injured in the lathi charge. His death led revolutionaries like Chandrashekar Azad and Bhagat Singh to assassinate the British police officer J. P. Saunders, who they believed was responsible for the death of Lala Lajpat Rai.

Bal Gangadhar Tilak was a nationalist leader from the Central Indian province of Maharashtra. He has been widely acclaimed the "Father of Indian unrest" who used the press and Hindu occasions like Ganesh Chaturthi and symbols like the Cow to create unrest against the British administration in India. Tilak joined the Indian National Congress in 1890. Under the influence of such leaders, the political discourse of the Congress moved from the polite accusation that colonial rule was "un-British" to the forthright claim of Tilak that "Swaraj is my birthright and I will have it".

Bipin Chandra Pal of Bengal was another prominent figure of the Indian nationalist movement, who is considered a modern Hindu reformer, who stood for Hindu cultural nationalism and was opposed to sectarian communalism and Hindu majoritism. He joined the Indian National Congress in 1886 and was also one of the key members of the revolutionary India House.

==== Gandhi and Rāmarājya ====
Mahatma Gandhi never called himself a Hindu nationalist, but preached Hindu Dharma and concept of "Rama Rajya".

Though Mahatma Gandhi never called himself a "Hindu nationalist"; he believed in and propagated concepts like Dharma and introduced the concept of the "Rāma Rājya" (Rule of Lord Rāma) as part of his social and political philosophy. Gandhi said "By political independence I do not mean an imitation to the British House of Commons, or the soviet rule of Russia or the Fascist rule of Italy or the Nazi rule of Germany. They have systems suited to their genius. We must have ours suited to ours. What that can be is more than I can tell. I have described it as Ramarajya i.e., sovereignty of the people based on pure moral authority."

Gandhi emphasised that "Rāma Rājya" to him meant peace and justice, adding that "the ancient ideal of Ramarajya is undoubtedly one of true democracy in which the meanest citizen could be sure of swift justice without an elaborate and costly procedure". He also emphasised that it meant respect for all religions: "My Hinduism teaches me to respect all religions. In this lies the secret of Ramarajya".

While Gandhi had clarified that "by Ram Rajya I do not mean Hindu Raj. I mean by Ram Rajya, Divine Raj, the kingdom of God," his concept of "Rama Rajya" became a major concept in Hindu nationalism.

==== Madan Mohan Malviya ====
Madan Mohan Malviya, an educationist and a politician with the Indian National Congress was also a vociferous proponent of the philosophy of Bhagavad Gita (Bhagavad Gītā). He was the president of the Indian National Congress in the year 1909 and 1918. He was seen as a 'moderate' in the Congress and was also considered very close to Gandhi. He popularised the Sanskrit phrase "Satyameva Jayate" (Truth alone triumphs), from the Mundaka Upanishad, which today is the national motto of the Republic of India. He founded the Benaras Hindu University in 1919 and became its first Vice-Chancellor.

=== Keshav Baliram Hedgewar ===
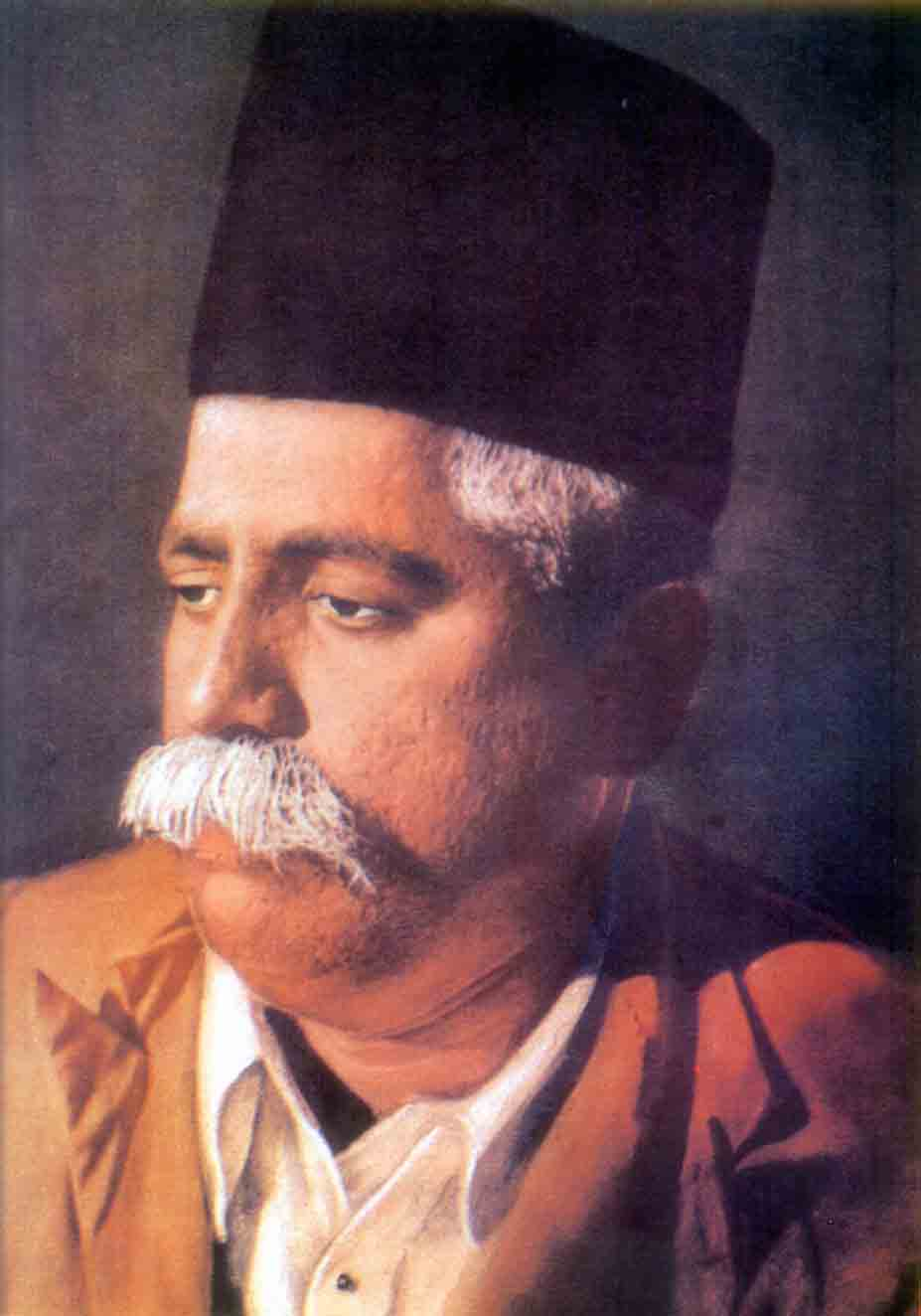
Keshav Baliram Hedgewar, the founding Sarsanghachalak (or "Supreme Executive") of the Rashtriya Swayamsevak Sangh

Another leader of prime importance in the ascent of Hindu nationalism was Keshav Baliram Hedgewar of Nagpur. Hedgewar as a medical student in Calcutta had been part of the revolutionary activities of the Hindu Mahasabha, Anushilan Samiti and Jugantar. He was charged with sedition in 1921 by the British Administration and served a year in prison. He was briefly a member of the Indian National Congress. In 1925, he left the Congress to form the Rashtriya Swayamsevak Sangh (RSS) with the help of Hindu Mahasabha Leader B. S. Moonje, Bapuji Soni, Gatate Ji etc., which would become the focal point of Hindu movements in Independent India. The Rashtriya Swayamsevak Sangh started by him became one of the most prominent Hindu organisation with its influence ranging in the social and political spheres of India.

In 1930, when Mahatma Gandhi started Satyagraha movement against the British Government, Hedgewar participated in the movement in his capacity and did not let the RSS join the freedom movement officially. The RSS portrayed itself as a social movement rather than a political party, and did not play a central role in any of the Indian independence movement. However, the RSS emphatically rejected the Congress policy of cooperation with the Muslims. Subsequently, in 1934, the Congress banned its members from joining RSS, Hindu Mahasabha or Muslim League.

After the death of Hedgewar in 1940, M. S. Golwalkar became head of the organisation. RSS continued to avoid participation in anti-British activities, as Golwalkar did not want to give the British colonial administration any excuse to ban the RSS. After the Muslim League passed the Lahore Resolution demanding a separate Pakistan, the RSS campaigned for a Hindu nation, but stayed away from the independence struggle. When the British colonial government banned military drills and the use of uniforms in non-official organisations, Golwalkar terminated the RSS military department. RSS had played no role in the Quit India Movement nor the naval revolt.

== Post-independence ==
After the assassination of Mahatma Gandhi by Nathuram Godse, the Sangh Parivar was plunged into distress when the RSS was accused of involvement in his murder. Along with the conspirators and the assassin, Vinayak Damodar Savarkar was also arrested. The court acquitted Savarkar, and the RSS was found be to completely unlinked with the conspirators. The Hindu Mahasabha, of which Godse was a member, lost membership and popularity. The effects of public outrage had a permanent effect on the Hindu Mahasabha.

=== Rashtriya Swayamsevak Sangh ===
The Rashtriya Swayamsevak Sangh, which was started in 1925, had grown by the end of British rule in India. In January 1948, Mahatma Gandhi was assassinated by Nathuram Godse, a former member of the RSS. Following the assassination, many prominent leaders of the RSS were arrested, and the RSS as an organisation was banned on 4 February 1948 by the then Home Minister Patel. During the court proceedings in relation to the assassination Godse began claiming that he had left the organisation in 1946. The then Indian Deputy Prime Minister and Home Minister, Vallabhbhai Patel had remarked that the "RSS men expressed joy and distributed sweets after Gandhi's death".

The charged RSS leaders were acquitted of the conspiracy charge by the Supreme Court of India. Following his release in August 1948, Golwalkar wrote to Prime Minister Jawaharlal Nehru to lift the ban on RSS. After Nehru replied that the matter was the responsibility of the Home Minister, Golwalkar consulted Vallabhai Patel regarding the same. Patel then demanded an absolute pre-condition that the RSS adopt a formal written constitution and make it public, where Patel expected RSS to pledge its loyalty to the Constitution of India, accept the Tricolor as the National Flag of India, define the power of the head of the organisation, make the organisation democratic by holding internal elections, authorisation of their parents before enrolling the pre-adolescents into the movement, and to renounce violence and secrecy.

Golwalkar launched an agitation against this demand during which he was imprisoned again. Later, a constitution was drafted for RSS, which, however, initially did not meet any of Patel's demands. After a failed attempt to agitate again, eventually the RSS's constitution was amended according to Patel's wishes except the procedure for selecting the head of the organisation and the enrolment of pre-adolescents. However, the organisation's internal democracy which was written into its constitution, remained a 'dead letter'.

On 11 July 1949, the Government of India lifted the ban on the RSS by issuing a communique stating that the decision to lift the ban on the RSS had been taken in view of the RSS leader Golwalkar's undertaking to make the group's loyalty towards the Constitution of India and acceptance and respect towards the National Flag of India more explicit in the Constitution of the RSS, which was to be worked out in a democratically.

After the ban was revoked RSS resumed its activities. The 1960s saw the volunteers of the RSS join the different social and political movements. Movements that saw a large presence of volunteers included the Bhoodan, a land reform movement led by prominent Gandhian Vinoba Bhave and the Sarvodaya led by another Gandhian Jayaprakash Narayan. RSS supported trade union, the Bharatiya Mazdoor Sangh and political party Bharatiya Jana Sangh also grew into considerable prominence by the end of the decade.

Another prominent development was the formation of the Vishwa Hindu Parishad (VHP), an organisation of Hindu religious leaders, supported by the RSS, to unite the various Hindu religious denominations and to usher a social reform. The first VHP meeting in Mumbai was attended among others by all the Shankaracharyas, Jain leaders, Sikh leader Master Tara Singh Malhotra, the Dalai Lama and contemporary Hindu leaders like Swami Chinmayananda. From its initial years, the VHP led a concerted attack on the social evils of untouchability and casteism while launching social welfare programmes in the areas of education and health care, especially for the Scheduled Castes, backward classes, and the tribals.

The organisations started and supported by the RSS volunteers came to be known collectively as the Sangh Parivar. The next few decades saw a steady growth of the influence of the Sangh Parivar in the social and political space of India.

=== Ayodhya dispute ===
The Ayodhya dispute (Hindi: अयोध्या विवाद) is a political, historical and socio-religious debate in India, centred on a plot of land in the city of Ayodhya, located in Ayodhya district, Uttar Pradesh. The main issues revolve around access to a site traditionally regarded as the birthplace of the Hindu deity Rama, the history and location of the Babri Mosque at the site, and whether a previous Hindu temple was demolished or modified to create the mosque.

=== Sexual and gender minorities ===
Contrary to the lean of conservative parties in the western world, the BJP has been supported by sexual minorities such as women and transgender people The party was influential in sponsoring a serious of agitations in support of women and protests against the rape and murder of a woman doctor, a movement that has been called "reclaim the night".

== Hindutva and Hindu Rashtra ==
=== Sarkar ===
Professor Benoy Kumar Sarkar coined the term Hindu Rastra. In his book named Building of Hindu Rastra (হিন্দু রাস্ট্রের গড়ন) presented the idea of structural of Hindu state and directives for the socio-economic and political system of the Hindu state. He is deemed the pioneer ideologue of Hindu Rashtra. Many people identify his philosophy as 'Sarkarism'.

His writings on this subject amounted to nearly 30,000 pages. A complete list of his publications is contained in Bandyopadhyay's book The Political Ideas of Benoy Kumar Sarkar.

- 1914/1921 The Positive Background of Hindu Sociology
- 1916 The beginning of Hindu culture as world-power (A.D. 300-600)
- 1916 Chinese Religion Through Hindu Eyes
- 1918 Hindu achievements in exact science a study in the history of scientific development

In 1919, he authored a study in the American Political Science Review presenting a "Hindu theory of international relations" which drew on thinkers such as Kautilya, Manu and Shookra, and the text of the Mahabharata. In 1921, he authored a Political Science Quarterly study presenting a "Hindu Theory of the State." According to Barry Buzan and Amitav Acharya, Sarkar's works "may be the first major IR contributions by an Indian, and one of the first modern efforts to develop an indigenous Non-Western theory of IR."

=== Savarkar ===
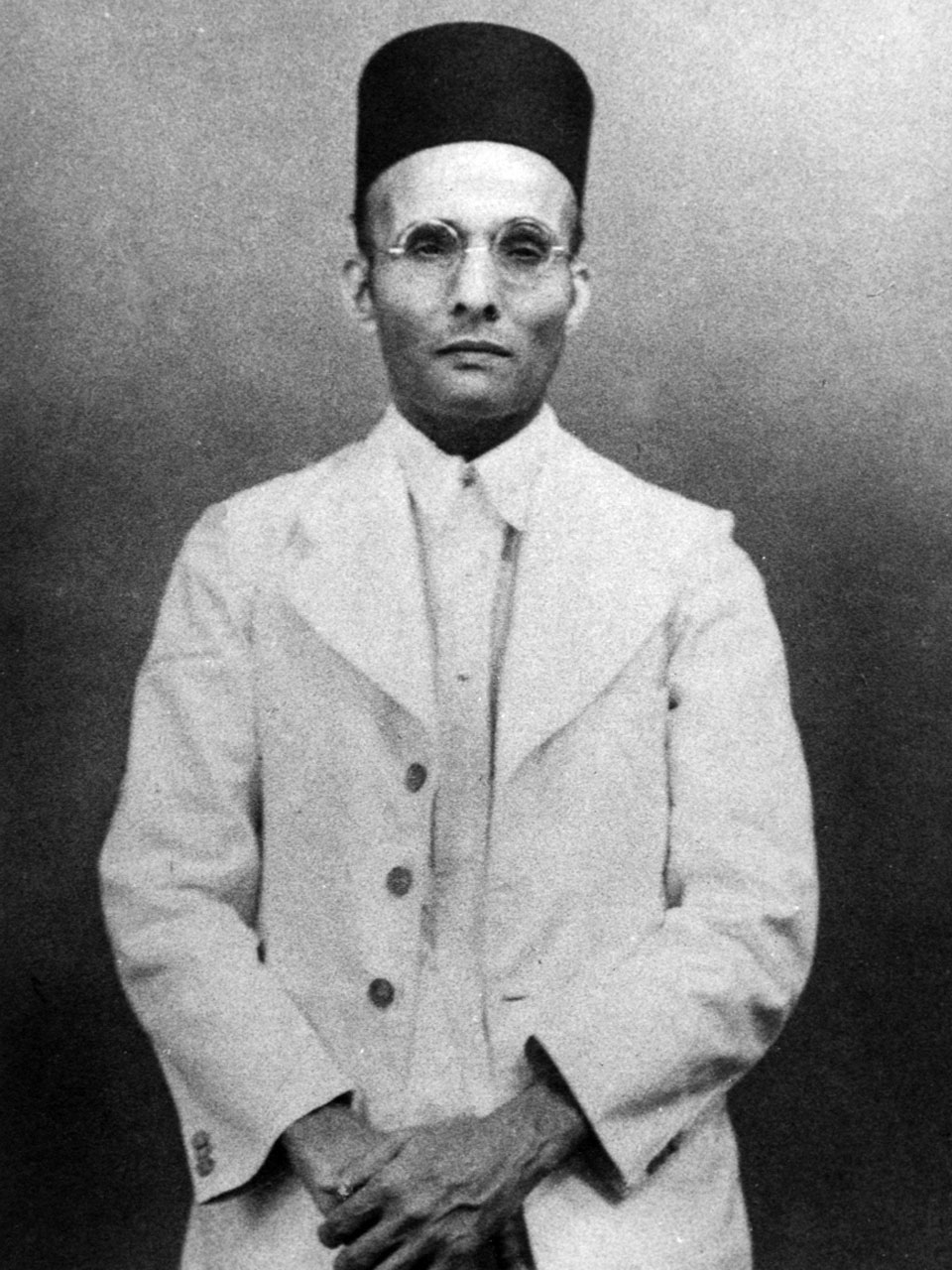
Savarkar c. 1910

Savarkar was one of the first in the twentieth century to attempt a definitive description of the term "Hindu" in terms of what he called Hindutva meaning Hinduness. The coinage of the term "Hindutva" was an attempt by Savarkar, who was non-religious and a rationalist to de-link it from any religious connotations that had become attached to it. He defined the word Hindu as: "He who considers India as both his Fatherland and Holyland". He thus defined Hindutva ("Hindu-ness") or Hindu as different from Hinduism.

This distinction was emphasised on the basis of territorial loyalty rather than on religious practices. In this book which was written in the backdrop of the Khilafat Movement and the subsequent Malabar rebellion, Savarkar wrote "Their [Muslims' and Christians'] holy land is far off in Arabia or Palestine. Their mythology and Godmen, ideas and heroes are not the children of this soil. Consequently, their names and their outlook smack of foreign origin. Their love is divided".

Savarkar had made it clear that Hindutva is not the same thing as Hinduism and it does not concern religion or rituals but the basis of India’s national character.

Savarkar also defined the concept of Hindu Rashtra (transl. Hindu State). The concept of Hindu Polity called for the protection of Hindu people and their culture and emphasised that political and economic systems should be based on native thought rather than on the concepts borrowed from the West.

=== Mukherjee ===
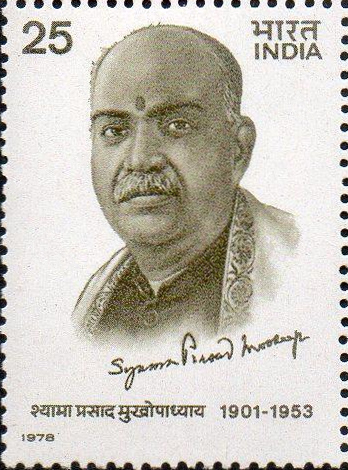
Syama Prasad Mukherjee, who founded the Hindu nationalist Bharatiya Jana Sangh, on a 1978 stamp of India

Mookerjee was the founder of the Nationalist Bharatiya Jana Sangh party, the precursor of the Bharatiya Janata Party. Mookerjee was firmly against Nehru's invitation to the Pakistani PM, and their joint pact to establish minority commissions and guarantee minority rights in both countries. He wanted to hold Pakistan directly responsible for the influx of millions of Hindu refugees from East Pakistan, who had left the state fearing religious persecution and violence aided by the state.

After consultation with Golwalkar of RSS, Mookerjee founded Bharatiya Jana Sangh on 21 October 1951 at Delhi and he became the first President of it. The BJS was ideologically close to the Rashtriya Swayamsevak Sangh and widely considered the political arm of Hindu Nationalism. It was opposed to appeasement of India's Muslims. The BJS also favored a uniform civil code governing personal law matters for both Hindus and Muslims, wanted to ban cow slaughter and end the special status given to the Muslim-majority state of Jammu and Kashmir. The BJS founded the Hindutva agenda which became the wider political expression of India's Hindu majority.

Mookerjee opposed the Indian National Congress's decision to grant Kashmir a special status with its own flag and Prime Minister. According to Congress's decision, no one, including the President of India could enter into Kashmir without the permission of Kashmir's Prime Minister. In opposition to this decision, he entered Kashmir on 11 May 1953. Thereafter, he was arrested and jailed in a dilapidated house. Following medical complications, he was administered penicillin despite having informed the doctor-in-charge of his allergy to penicillin, and he died on 23 June 1953. Mookherjee's death later compelled Nehru to remove the Permit system, the post of Sadar-e-Riayasat and of Prime Minister of Jammu & Kashmir.

Though Mukherjee was not associated with RSS, he is widely revered by members and supporters of the RSS and the Vishwa Hindu Parishad.

=== Golwalkar ===
M. S. Golwalkar, the second head of the Rashtriya Swayamsevak Sangh (RSS), was to further this non-religious, territorial loyalty based definition of "Hindu" in his book Bunch of Thoughts. Hindutva and Hindu Rashtra would form the basis of Golwalkar's ideology and that of the RSS.

While emphasising religious pluralism, Golwalkar believed that Semitic monotheism and exclusivism were incompatible with and against the native Hindu culture. He wrote:

Those creeds (Islam and Christianity) have but one prophet, one scripture and one God, other than whom there is no path of salvation for the human soul. It requires no great intelligence to see the absurdity of such a proposition.

He added:

As far as the national tradition of this land is concerned, it never considers that with a change in the method of worship, an individual ceases to be the son of the soil and should be treated as an alien. Here, in this land, there can be no objection to God being called by any name whatever. Ingrained in this soil is love and respect for all faiths and religious beliefs. He cannot be a son of this soil at all who is intolerant of other faiths.

He further would echo the views of Savarkar on territorial loyalty, but with a degree of inclusiveness, when he wrote "So, all that is expected of our Muslim and Christian co-citizens is the shedding of the notions of their being 'religious minorities' as also their foreign mental complexion and merging themselves in the common national stream of this soil."

After the assassination of Mahatma Gandhi, Golwalkar and Hindu Mahasabha's senior leaders such as Shyama Prasad Mukharji founded a new political party as Jan Sangh, many of Hindu Mahasabha members joined Jan Sangh.

=== Deendayal Upadhyaya ===
Deendayal Upadhyaya, another RSS ideologue, presented Integral Humanism as the political philosophy of the erstwhile Bharatiya Jana Sangh in the form of four lectures delivered in Bombay on 22–25 April 1965 as an attempt to offer a third way, rejecting both communism and capitalism as the means for socio-economic emancipation.

=== Contemporary descriptions ===
The concept of "'Hindutva" continues to be espoused by organisations like the RSS and political parties like the Bharatiya Janata Party (BJP). But the definition does not have the same rigidity with respect to the concept of "holy land" laid down by Savarkar, and stresses on inclusivism and patriotism. BJP leader Atal Bihari Vajpayee, in 1998, articulated the concept of "holy land" in Hindutva as follows: "Mecca can continue to be holy for the Muslims but India should be holier than the holy for them. You can go to a mosque and offer namaz, you can keep the roza. We have no problem. But if you have to choose between Mecca or Islam and India you must choose India. All the Muslims should have this feeling: we will live and die only for this country."

In a 1995 landmark judgment, the Supreme Court of India observed that "Ordinarily, Hindutva is understood as a way of life or a state of mind and is not to be equated with or understood as religious Hindu fundamentalism. A Hindu may embrace a non-Hindu religion without ceasing to be a Hindu and since the Hindu is disposed to think synthetically and to regard other forms of worship, strange gods and divergent doctrines as inadequate rather than wrong or objectionable, he tends to believe that the highest divine powers complement each other for the well-being of the world and mankind."

== Hindu Rashtra movements in Nepal ==
In 2008, Nepal was declared a secular state after the Maoist led 1996–2006 Nepalese Civil War and the following 2006 Nepalese revolution led to the abolition of monarchy of Nepal. Before becoming a secular republic, Kingdom of Nepal was the world's only country to have Hinduism as its state religion. Thereafter, the Rastriya Prajatantra Party Nepal changed its constitution to support monarchy and the re-establishment of the Hindu state. In December 2015, a pro-Hindu and a pro-monarchy protest was held at Kathmandu. The chairperson of CPN-Maoist Prachanda, claimed that Muslims were oppressed by the state and assured the Muslim crowd of Muslim Mukti Morcha to give special rights to Muslims in order to appease the community and garner Muslim support as his party faced losses in the Terai region during the 2008 Nepalese Constituent Assembly election. However, during the 2015 "Hindu Rashtra" campaigning in Nepal by the Rashtriya Prajatantra Party Nepal, the Nepalese Muslim groups demanded Nepal to be a "Hindu Rashtra" (Hindu Nation) under which they claimed to "feel secure" compared to the secular constitution. Nepalese Muslim groups also opined that the increasing influences of Christianity in Nepal that promote conversion against all other faiths is a reason they want Nepal to have a Hindu state identity under which all religions are protected. Muslim leader Babu Khan Pathan who is the chairperson of the Muslim Rashtrawadi Manch Nepalgunj supported the Hindu Rashtra campaign and claimed that 80 percent Muslim citizens of Banke district supported the restoration of Hindu state. He gave the following clarification for the support of Hindu statehood in Nepal:

Turning the country secular is nothing but a design to break the longstanding unity among Muslims and Hindus. So there is no alternative to reinstating the country’s old Hindu State identity in order to allow fellow citizens to live with religious tolerance. We don't need a secular identity, but want to see the country called Hindu State as this ensures safety and peace for all. We are Nepali Muslims and proud of it, because we have our unique culture of being the Muslims of this land. Everything was going well until we were ambushed by political parties’ sudden decision to declare the country secular, which is deplorable as it is clear that they acted at the behest of foreign agents.

While announcing the party manifesto for the 2017 Nepalese general election, the pro Hindu Rashtriya Prajatantra Party Nepal chairperson Kamal Thapa stated that Hindu statehood is the only means of establishing national unity and stability. He stated that the secularisation of the state was done without the involvement of general public and thus, a referendum was due on the issue. Furthermore, chairperson Thapa argued that the conversion of Nepal into a secular republic was an organised attempt to weaken the national identity of Nepal and the religious conversions have seriously affected the indigenous and Dalit communities. The Rastriya Prajatantra Party Nepal has stated support for a Hindu state with religious freedom and registered an amendment proposal for such on 19 March 2017.

On 30 November 2020, a pro-Hindu and a pro-monarchy protest was held at Kathmandu. Similar protests were held on other major cities like Pokhara and Butwal.

On 4 December 2020, mass protests were held at Maitighar that ended in Naya Baneshwor demanding the restoration of Hindu statehood with constitutional monarchy. The protestors carried the national flags and posters of the founding father of modern Nepal, King Prithvi Narayan Shah, and chanted slogans supporting Hindu statehood. Protestors claimed the Hindu statehood is a means of national unity and well being of the people. This protest is considered one of the biggest pro-monarchy demonstrations.

On 11 January 2021, mass protests were held at Kathmandu demanding the restoration of Hindu statehood with monarchy. Police baton charged at the protestors around the Prime Minister's Office resulting in protestors responding with stones and sticks. In August 2021, similar protests led by former Nepal Army General Rookmangud Katawal were also observed.

== See also ==
- Hindutva
- Akhand Bharat
- Ethnic relations in India
- Hinduism in India
- History of India (1947–present)
- Indocentrism
- List of Hindu nationalist political parties
- List of Hindu organisations
- Religion in India
- Religious violence in India
- Revocation of the special status of Jammu and Kashmir
- Saffron terror

== Books ==
- Pradhan, Kumar L. (2012), Thapa Politics in Nepal: With Special Reference to Bhim Sen Thapa, 1806–1839, New Delhi: Concept Publishing Company, p. 278, ISBN 978-81-8069-813-2
- Skinner, Debra; Pach III, Alfred; Holland, Dorothy (1998). Selves in Time and Place: Identities, Experience, and History in Nepal. Rowman & Littlefield Publishers. ISBN 978-0-8476-8599-8.
- Messerschmidt, Donald Alan (1992). Muktinath: Himalayan pilgrimage, a cultural & historical guide. Sahayogi Press.
- Dharam Vir (1988). Education and Polity in Nepal: An Asian Experiment. Northern Book Centre. ISBN 978-81-85119-39-7.
- Borgström, Bengt-Erik (1980), The patron and the panca: village values and pancayat democracy in Nepal, Vikas House, ISBN 978-0-7069-0997-5
- Stone, Linda (1988), Illness Beliefs and Feeding the Dead in Hindu Nepal: An Ethnographic Analysis, E. Mellen, ISBN 978-0-88946-060-7
- Kara, Siddharth (2012), Bonded Labor: Tackling the System of Slavery in South Asia, Columbia University Press, ISBN 978-0-231-52801-6
- Graham, Bruce Desmond (3 December 2007), Hindu Nationalism and Indian Politics: The Origins and Development of the Bharatiya Jana Sangh, Cambridge University Press, ISBN 978-0-521-05374-7
- Singh, Neerja (28 July 2015), Patel, Prasad and Rajaji: Myth of the Indian Right, SAGE Publications, ISBN 978-93-5150-266-1
