= V. Shantha Kumari =

Indian politician (born 1952)

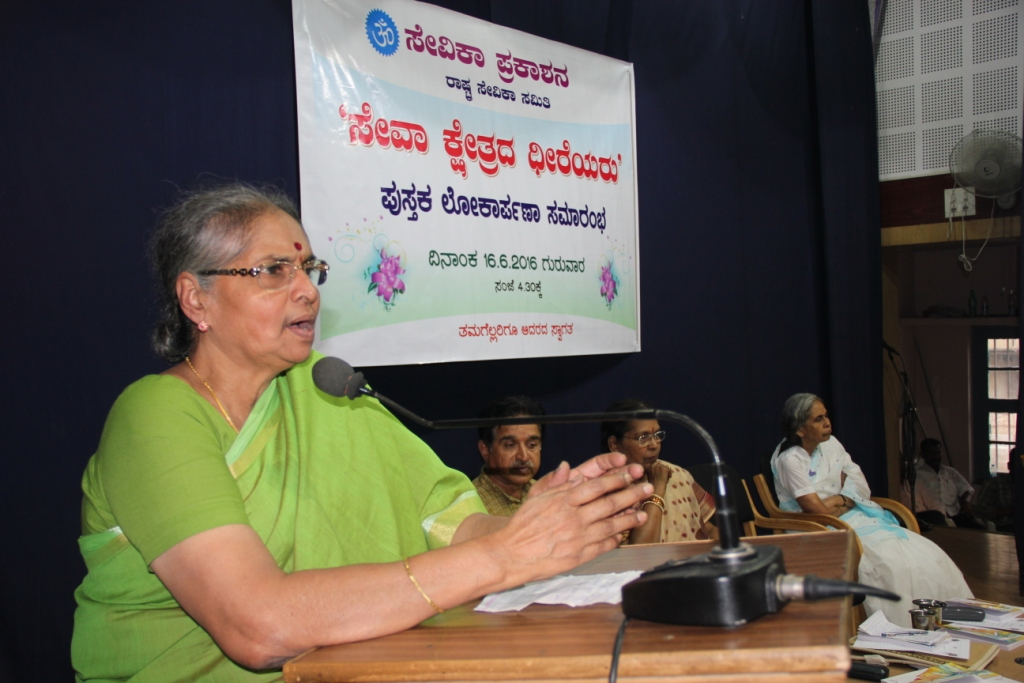
- V. Shantha Kumari addressing a gathering in Bengaluru in 2016

Pramukh Sanchalika of Rashtra Sevika Samiti
- In office 2013 – Incumbent
- Preceded by: Pramila tai Medhe

Personal details
- Born: Shantha Kumari; 5 February 1952 (age 74) Bangalore, Mysore State, India
- Education: B. Sc.; M. Ed.
- Occupation: Pramukh Sanchalika (Chief of Rashtra Sevika Samiti)

Venkatramaiah Shantha Kumari (born 5 February 1952), also known as "Shanthakka," is the current Chief (Sanskrit: Pramukh Sanchalika) of the Hindutva women's organization Rashtra Sevika Samiti. She became Chief in 2013.

== Early life ==
Kumari was born in Bengaluru, Karnataka. Her father was active in the Quit India Movement. In 1968, when she was 16, Kumari came in contact with Rashtra Sevika Samiti. By 1969, she was conducting a daily shakha at Wilson Garden, Bengaluru. Soon after, she was made the Chief Instructor. Within five years, she was a Nagar Karyavahak (Town Chief) of Rashtra Sevika Samiti.

== Career ==
In 1977, Bengaluru hosted a Rashtra Sevika Samiti event where Kumari met the then-Chief of the organisation, Laxmibai Kelkar. Kelkar exhorted Kumari to devote more of her time and energy to Samiti activities. By 1978, Kumari decided that she would devote herself full-time to the Samiti, and would not marry. That same year, she became the Sahakaryavahika of the Karnataka region.

In those days, Samiti activists were not encouraged to adopt the semi-renunciate life style adopted by RSS pracharaks and travel as active field workers. They were expected to live within their families and work for the Samiti in various capacities.

In 1991, Kumari became Sahakaryavahika of the southern region (Karnataka, Tamilnadu, Andhra Pradesh and Kerala).

In the early nineties, Samiti members began to travel and work as field activists. In 1994, Shantha Kumari renounced home to live at the Samiti office at Bengaluru. In 1995, she resigned from her job and began to travel within Karnataka as a pracharika of the Samiti. From 1996 onwards, she apprenticed under then-Chief of the Samiti, Pramila Tai Medhe. She was made Sahakaryavahika in 1997.

Shantha Kumari has apprenticed with all her predecessors at Rashtra Sevika Samiti: Vandaneeya Moushiji, Laxmibai Kelkar, Saraswati Tai Apte, Usha Tai Chati, and Pramila Tai Medhe.

== Feminist views ==
Shantha Kumari said she believes the Rastra Sevika Samiti to be different from other women's organizations, specifically those which take the western feminist approach.

Preceded by Pramila tai Medhe	Pramukh Sanchalika (Chief of Rashtra Sevika Samiti); 2013 –	Succeeded by Incumbent
