= G. Pulla Reddy =

Indian businessman and activist

G. Pulla Reddy (Gunampalli Pulla Reddy) was a businessman Andhra Pradesh, India, best known for the Pulla Reddy Sweets chain in Hyderabad and Kurnool.

== Life ==
Sri G. Pulla Reddy began selling sweets in 1948 using a small cart. The business grew, spreading from the lanes of Kurnool to eventually encompass four shops in India. Later he could open stores in many US cities, including New York City, cities in California and Charlotte, North Carolina. He founded the G. Pulla Reddy College of Engineering & Technology in Kurnool and started G. Narayanamma Institute of Technology and Science in Hyderabad.

Sri G. Pulla Reddy had been active in Hindu nationalist organizations. He became a sanghchalak (local director) of the Rashtriya Swayamsevak Sangh (RSS) in 1974, and set up the Pulla Reddy Charitable Trust in 1975. He became the Andhra Pradesh state Vice-President for the Vishva Hindu Parishad in 1980. He also set up the Samskrita Bhasha Prachar Samiti (Society for the propagation of Sanskrit). His son, G. Raghava Reddy, succeeds him in the Vishva Hindu Parishad. He died on 9 May 2007. He funded many religious activities during his time.
