= Neramu Siksha (2009 film) =

- Release Date Poster
- Directed by: Vijaya Nirmala
- Written by: Paruchuri brothers (dialogues)
- Screenplay by: Vijaya Nirmala
- Based on: Vala by Bollimuntha Nageswara Rao
- Produced by: Vijaya Nirmala
- Starring: Krishna; Vijaya Nirmala; Jayasudha; Akul Balaji; Dheeraj; Akarsha
- Cinematography: K. Srinivasa Reddy
- Music by: Koti
- Release date: 30 May 2009
- Country: India
- Language: Telugu

Neramu Siksha (transl. Crime and punishment) is a 2009 Indian Telugu-language legal drama film directed by Vijaya Nirmala starring herself, Krishna, Jayasudha, Akul Balaji, Dheeraj and Akarsha. It is based on the novel Vala by Bollimuntha Nageswara Rao. The film was released on 30 May 2009.

== Plot ==
A wealthy man's reckless driving causes a fatal accident that blinds one man and kills another, forcing the guilty driver to secretly serve and help the victim's family to redeem himself.

== Cast ==
- Krishna as Bhargav
- Vijaya Nirmala as Archana
- Jayasudha as Saujanya
- Akul Balaji as Rohit
- Dheeraj as Akhil
- Akarsha as Sireesha
- M. Balayya as Judge
- Sarath Babu as Lawyer
- Giri Babu as Lawyer
- AVS
- Sunil as Advocate
- Jaya Prakash Reddy as MLA Suryanarayan
- Raghunatha Reddy as Police Inspector
- Raja Ravindra
- Rama Prabha
- Geetanjali as Sireesha's mother
- Sri Lakshmi
- Geetha Singh
- Gautam Raju
- Gundu Hanumantha Rao

An old song featuring Krishna and Jayasudha was used in the film.

== Production ==
The film is based on the novel Vala by Bollimuntha Nageswara Rao that featured in Swathi magazine. The film talks about reconsidering hanging as a punishment. Krishna plays a lawyer, and Akul Balaji made his Telugu debut with this film. The muhurat shot took place on 21 January 2009. Five days later, shooting for the film took place at G. Narayanamma Institute of Technology and Science, where Krishna was awarded the Padma Bhushan. In February 2009, Vijaya Nirmala celebrated her birthday on the sets of this film at her resort, Planet 10, in Hyderabad. As of April 2009, the film was finished shooting and entered its re-recording phase.

== Soundtrack ==
The music was composed by Koti. The audio launch was held on 27 April 2009 with Dasari Narayana Rao and Naresh in attendance.

Track listing
No.	Title	Lyrics	Singer(s)	Length
1.	"Nachore Nachore"	Suddala Ashok Teja	S. P. Balasubrahmanyam, Sunitha Upadrashta	4:34
2.	"Thelisenade Thalachenade"	Ramajogayya Sastry	Sreerama Chandra, Pranavi	3:33
3.	"Enduko Enduko"	Venigalla Rambabu	S. P. Balasubrahmanyam	4:38
4.	"Balle Balle Balamani"	Ramajogayya Sastry	Achu Rajamani, Jyothi	3:23
5.	"Ee Poddulu Eragani"	C. Narayana Reddy	S. P. Balasubrahmanyam, P. Susheela	4:27
Total length:				20:35

== Release and reception ==
The film was released on 30 May 2009, coinciding with Krishna's birthday. A day after the film's release, Krishna and Vijaya Niramala reported that the film was a success. A critic from Sitara magazine wrote that in regards to the story, narration and cinematography, the inspiration of old films was evident.
