= Vishnu Sadashiv Kokje =

Indian judge (born 1939)

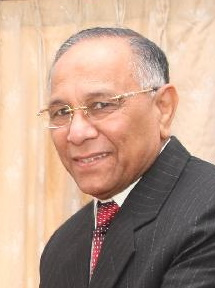
- Kokje in 2008

Governor of Himachal Pradesh
- In office 8 May 2003 – 19 July 2008
- Preceded by: Suraj Bhan
- Succeeded by: Prabha Rau

International President of Vishva Hindu Parishad
- Preceded by: Raghava Reddy
- Succeeded by: Rabindra Narain Singh

Personal details
- Born: 6 September 1939 (age 86) present-day Madhya Pradesh
- Education: B.A.LLB

Vishnu Sadashiv Kokje (born 6 September 1939) is a retired Indian judge, who served as the Governor of Himachal Pradesh from 8 May 2003 to 19 July 2008 and International President of Vishva Hindu Parishad.

== Birth and Early Life ==
On 6 September 1939, Vishnu Sadashiv Kokje was born in Dahi village in Madhya Pradesh's Dhar district. He finished his education at Dhar, graduated from Holkar College in Indore with a degree in mathematics, statistics, and economics, and earned an LLB from Government Arts and Commerce College in Indore. After completing his postgraduate studies in sociology at Christian College in Indore, he began practicing law in 1964.

== Judicial career ==
Kokje was born in Madhya Pradesh on 6 September 1939. He started practising law in 1964 after completing his LLB from Indore. He was appointed a judge of Madhya Pradesh High Court on 28 July 1990. He served as acting Chief Justice of Rajasthan High Court for 11 months in 2001 and was designated as senior advocate of the Supreme Court of India in September 2002.

== Roles as Governor, VHP President, and Legal Involvements ==
He became Governor of Himachal Pradesh on 8 May 2003, serving in that post until 19 July 2008. He also served as the President of the right-wing organisation Bharat Vikas Parishad. Shri Pravin Togadia was International Working President and he was succeeded by Shri Alok Kumar Advocate as International Working President of VHP. He served as one of the working defendants in the 2002 Zakia Jafri SC case.

== Vishva Hindu Parishad (VHP) ==
On 2018, Kokje became a member of the Vishwa Hindu Parishad (VHP). On 14 April 2018, he succeeded Raghav Reddy as International President of VHP. Vishnu Sadashiv Kokje was elected new VHP chief. For a number of years, the CIA World Factbook has characterized the VHP as a religious militant group. It is associated with the Hindu nationalist Rashtriya Swayamsevak Sangh (RSS), which was established in 1925. The RSS advocates for India to become a country with a majority of Hindus. For many years, the VHP has promoted a Hindu nation and has been accused by a number of observers and reports of being involved in attacks against Christians and Muslims during various communal crises in India.

From April 2012 to March 2014, he served as the all-India president of Bharat Vikas Parishad.
