= G Pulla Reddy Sweets =

Confectionery company in Andhra Pradesh, India

Pulla Reddy Sweets
- Company slogan: A sweet tradition
- Native name: పుల్లారెడ్డి నేతి మిఠాయిలు
- Industry: Food industry
- Founded: 1948; 78 years ago in Kurnool, Andhra Pradesh
- Founder: G. Pulla Reddy
- Headquarters: Greenlands Road, Begumpet, Hyderabad, Telangana
- Area served: South India
- Key people: G. Raghava Reddy (Chairman)
- Products: Indian sweets, Snacks
- Revenue: ₹45 Crores (2013)
- Website: www.gpullareddysweets.com

Pulla Reddy Sweets is an Indian sweets and snacks manufacturer based in Kurnool, Andhra Pradesh. It has a chain of retail sweet shop outlets in Hyderabad and Kurnool.

== History ==
Pullareddy began selling sweets (Burfi) in 1948, when he was aged 28, using a small push-cart in Kurnool, a town in Andhra Pradesh. The business grew, spreading from the lanes of Kurnool to eventually encompass several shops in India.

== See also ==
- Bikanervala
- List of Indian sweets and desserts
