= Laxmibai Kelkar =

Indian social reformer (1905–1978)

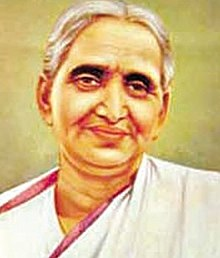

Pramukh Sanchalika of Rashtra Sevika Samiti

Mausiji
- In office October 1936 – November 1978
- Preceded by: Position established
- Succeeded by: Saraswati Apte

Personal details
- Born: Kamal Datey; 5 July 1905
- Died: 27 November 1978 (aged 73)
- Spouse: Purshottam Rao Kelkar
- Parent(s): Bhaskarrao Datey, Yashodabai

Laxmibai Kelkar (5 July 1905 – 27 November 1978), born Kamal Datey, and also known as "Mausiji", was an Indian social reformer. In 1936, she founded the Hindutva women's organisation Rashtra Sevika Samiti.

== Early life and education ==
Kamal Datey was born on July 5, 1905, in Nagpur. Her father, Bhaskarrao Datey, worked in the Accountant General's office, and her mother, Yashodabai, was a homemaker. Kamal began her education at a missionary school, but she left and later attended the Hindu Girls School. She left the school for unknown reasons.

== Biography ==
=== Marriage ===
In accordance with the customs of her time, Kamal married a lawyer, Purshottam Rao Kelkar, and she changed her name to Laxmibai Purshottam Kelkar. Her husband was friends with Congress member Narayan Bhaskar Khare. In 1932, her husband died. She had six sons and two daughters.

=== Involvement in the Indian independence movement ===
After the death of Lokmanya Tilak, Mahatma Gandhi left Sabarmati and selected Sevagram as his ashram. Living near the Sevagram ashram, she participated in meetings, prabhat pheries (morning processions), and other activities.

=== Founding of Rashtra Sevika Samiti ===
She was introduced to the Rashtriya Swayamsevak Sangh (RSS) through her sons. In 1936, Laxmibai met K. B. Hedgewar, the founder of the RSS. After this meeting, she founded the Rashtra Sevika Samiti on October 25, 1936, in Wardha.

== Death ==
Laxmibai Kelkar died on November 27, 1978.
