= Keshav Srushti =

Natural retreat in Uttan, Mumbai, India

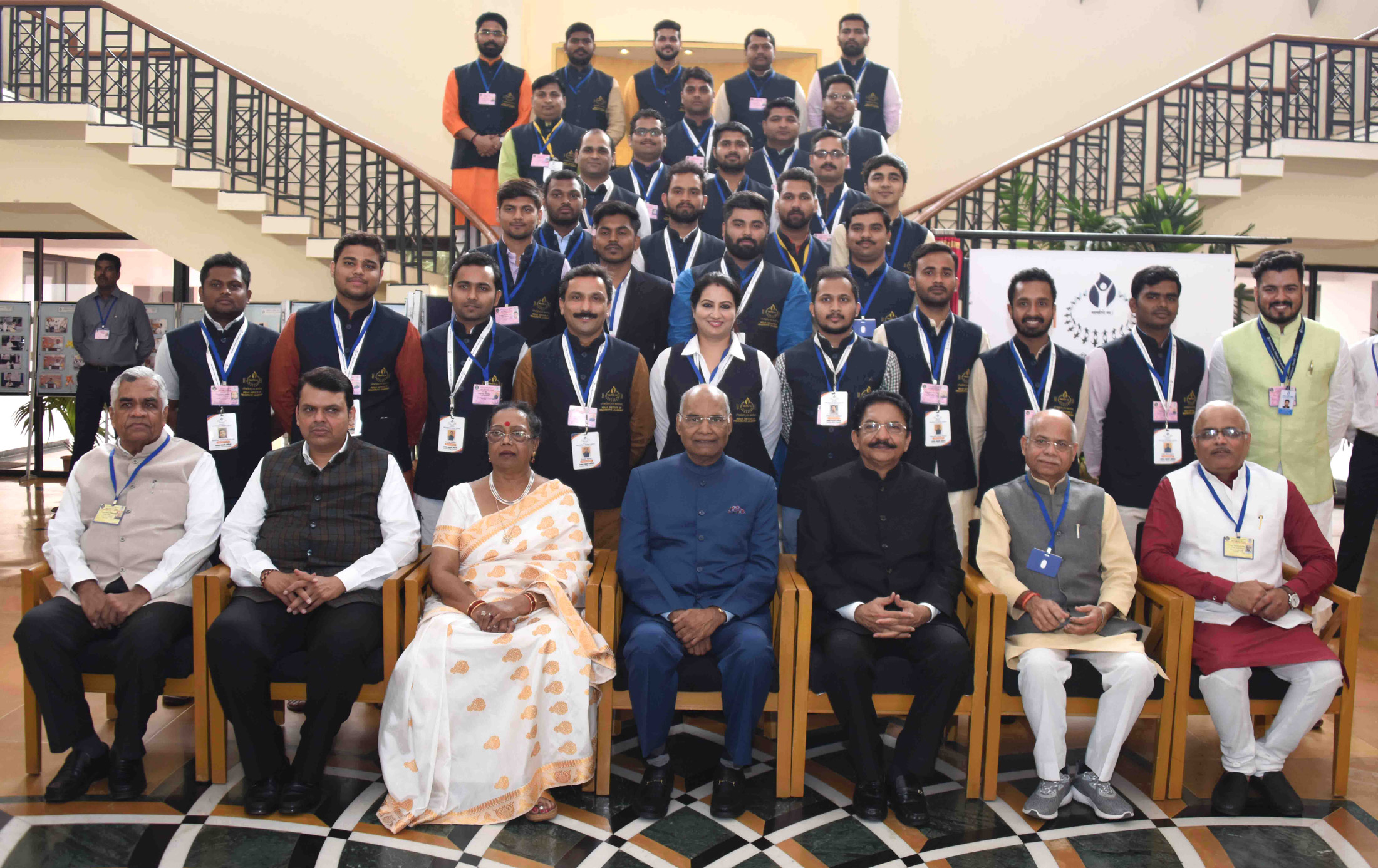
President Kovind at the inauguration of Economic democracy conclave in the Keshav Srushti Campus.

Keshav Srushti is a nature retreat in Mumbai, India. It is a unified campus of several organisations, run by the Rashtriya Swayamsevak Sangh (RSS), a Hindutva paramilitary organisation, in the memory of its founder K. B. Hedgewar.

== Initiatives ==
=== Social initiatives ===
In January 2015, the Suryakumbh, an event on social justice and environmental project, was organized at Keshav Srushti. The Suryakumbh event saw over 3639 students, from over 62 schools in Mumbai, participate to set the record for the largest solar cooking class.

=== Environmental initiatives ===
In March 2022, Keshav Srushti in collaboration with Brihanmumbai Municipal Corporation planted 7000 saplings in the suburb of Versova that included native saplings, medicinal herbs and butterfly shrubs. The plantation was done over an area of 1800 square metres at the Bala Guste garden Versova using the Akira Miyawaki technique of planting dense forests.
