= G. Narayanamma Institute of Technology and Science =

Women's engineering college in India

- Established: 1997
- Founders: G. Pulla Reddy
- Affiliations: Jawaharlal Nehru Technological University
- Location: 17°24′43″N 78°23′56″E
- Website: https://www.gnits.ac.in/

G. Narayanamma Institute of Technology and Science is a women's engineering college located in Hyderabad. It is affiliated to the Jawaharlal Nehru Technological University.

== History ==
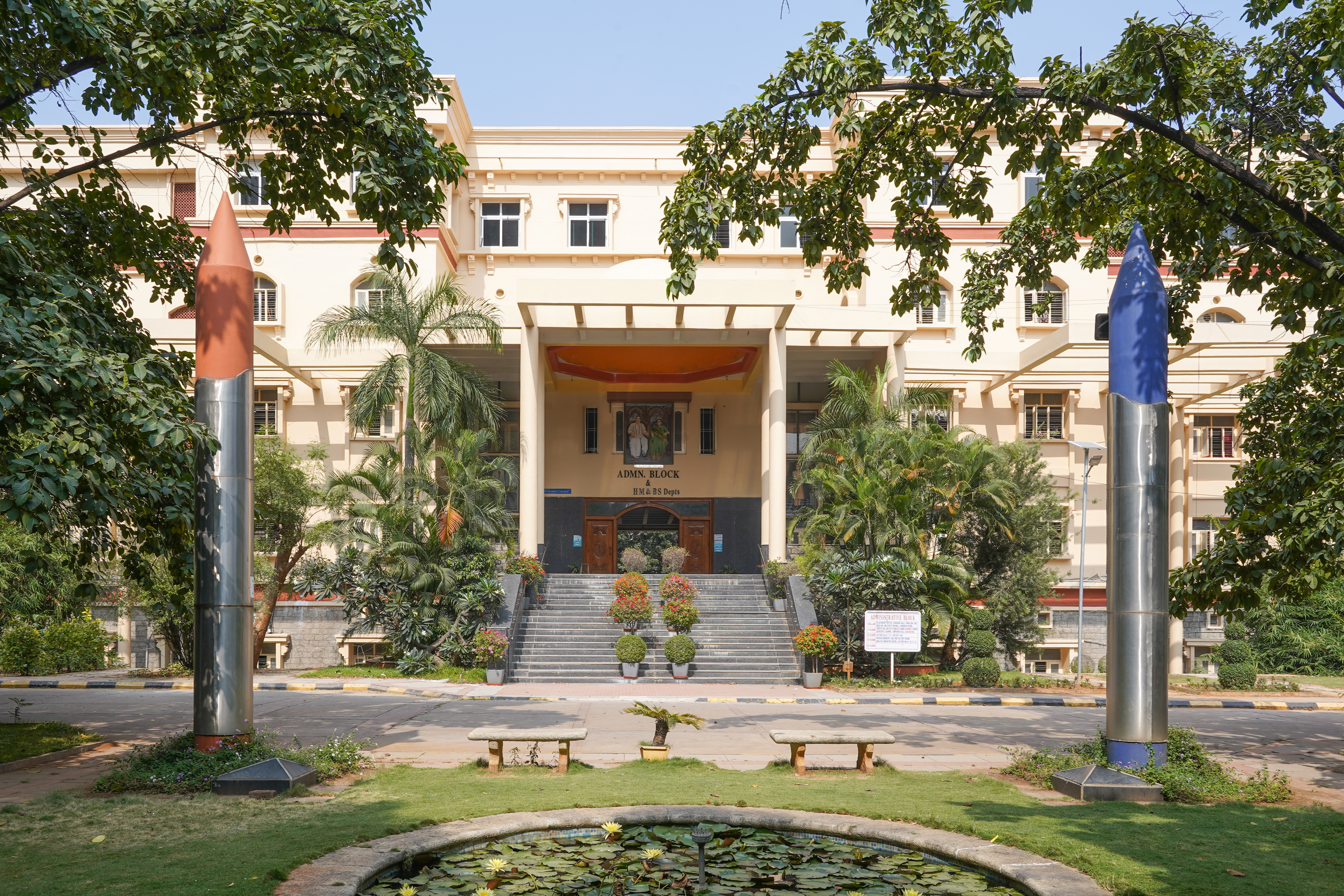
Administrative block

The college was founded by G. Pulla Reddy in 1997.

In 2023, the college celebrated its silver jubilee. President Droupadi Murmu, Governor Tamilisai Soundararajan and Union Minister G. Kishan Reddy were among those who attended the event.

== Campus ==
The campus is located at Shaikpet.

== Rankings ==
University rankings

Engineering – India
- NIRF (2022): 251-300

The college was ranked among 251-300 by NIRF among engineering colleges in India.
