= Rashtra Sevika Samiti =

Hindutva women's organisation

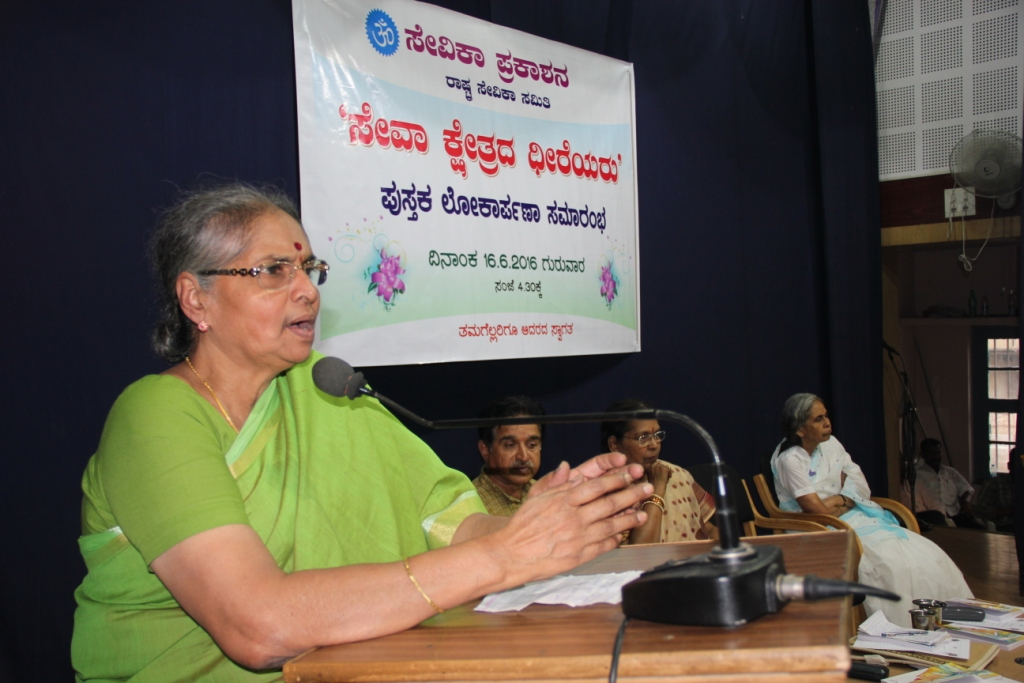
V. Shantha Kumari, Chief of the Rashtra Sevika Samiti, addressing a gathering in Bengaluru (2016)

The Rashtra Sevika Samiti (lit. 'National Women's Volunteer Committee') is a Hindutva women's organisation that parallels the Rashtriya Swayamsevak Sangh (RSS), a right-wing Hindutva paramilitary male-only organisation. It is often referred to as the "sister" of the RSS.

The current Chief (Sanskrit: Pramukh Sanchalika) of the Samiti is V. Shantha Kumari (referred to informally as "Shanthakka") and its General Secretary (Pramukh Karyavahika) is Sita Annadanam.

== History ==
In 1936, Laxmibai Kelkar visited K. B. Hedgewar, the founder of the Rashtriya Swayamsevak Sangh (RSS), and had a long discussion to persuade him of the need for starting a women's wing in the RSS. Hedgewar advised Kelkar to instead establish a separate organisation that would be autonomous and independent of the RSS, as both groups were ideologically identical. Hedgewar promised Kelkar unconditional solidarity, support and guidance. Following this, Kelkar established the Rashtra Sevika Samiti at Wardha on 25 October 1936.

== Chiefs of the organisation ==
No.	Name	Term
1	Laxmibai Kelkar	25 October 1936 – 27 November 1978
2	Saraswati Tai Apte	27 November 1978 – 9 March 1994
3	Usha Tai Chate	9 March 1994 – August 2006
4	Pramila Tai Medhe	August 2006 – 2012
5	V. Shantha Kumari	10 March 2013 – present

== See also ==
- Durga Vahini
- Rashtriya Swayamsevak Sangh
