= Rabindra Narain Singh =

Indian orthopedic surgeon

International President of Vishva Hindu Parishad
- Incumbent
- Assumed office July 2021
- Preceded by: Vishnu Sadashiv Kokje

Personal details
- Occupation: Orthopedic Surgeon
- Awards: Padma Shri in Medicine

Rabindra Narain Singh is an Indian orthopedic surgeon who is serving as International President of Vishva Hindu Parishad.

Singh was born in 1945 in Golma, Saharsa, Bihar, to District Judge Sri Radhabhallab Singh and Srimati Indu Devi. He is married and has 2 daughters and a son, Dr Ashish Kumar Singh.

In 2010, he was awarded the Padma Shri in Medicine. He also is a Member of Managing Committee of Indian Red Cross Society of Bihar.
