= Raghava Reddy =

Indian businessman

International President of Vishva Hindu Parishad
- Preceded by: Pravin Togadia
- Succeeded by: Vishnu Sadashiv Kokje

Personal details
- Occupation: Businessman

Gunampalli Raghava Reddy is a businessman, Hindu religious leader and a nationalist from Kurnool, Andhra Pradesh, India, best known for Pulla Reddy Sweets, chain of retail sweet outlets in Hyderabad and Kurnool.

He was the international president of the Hindu organization Vishwa Hindu Parishad (VHP).
