= Sadhvi Ritambhara =

Hindu nationalist leader

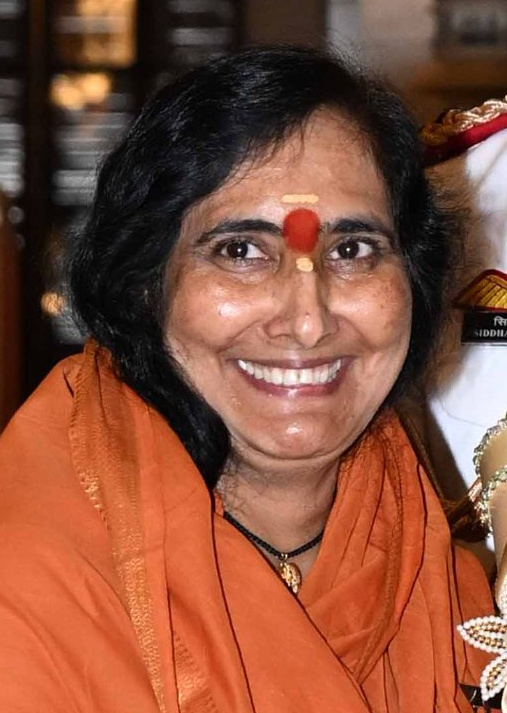

Personal life
- Born: December 31, 1963 (age 62) Doraha, Ludhiana district, Punjab

Religious life
- Religion: Hinduism
- Founder of: founder/chairperson of Durga Vahini.
- Philosophy: Hinduism

Sadhvi Ritambhara (born 31 December 1963) is a Hindu activist, public speaker and nationalist ideologue who is the founder-chairperson of Durga Vahini, the women's wing of the Vishva Hindu Parishad (VHP), established in 1991. She gained national prominence with VHP in the late 1980s through the Jan Jagran Abhiyan, and in the 1990s during the run up to the Babri Masjid demolition. Subsequently, she was falsely accused in the Liberhan Commission report, though later acquitted by the CBI court in 2020.

In January 2025, Sadhvi Ritambhara was conferred with India's third-highest civilian award, the Padma Bhushan.

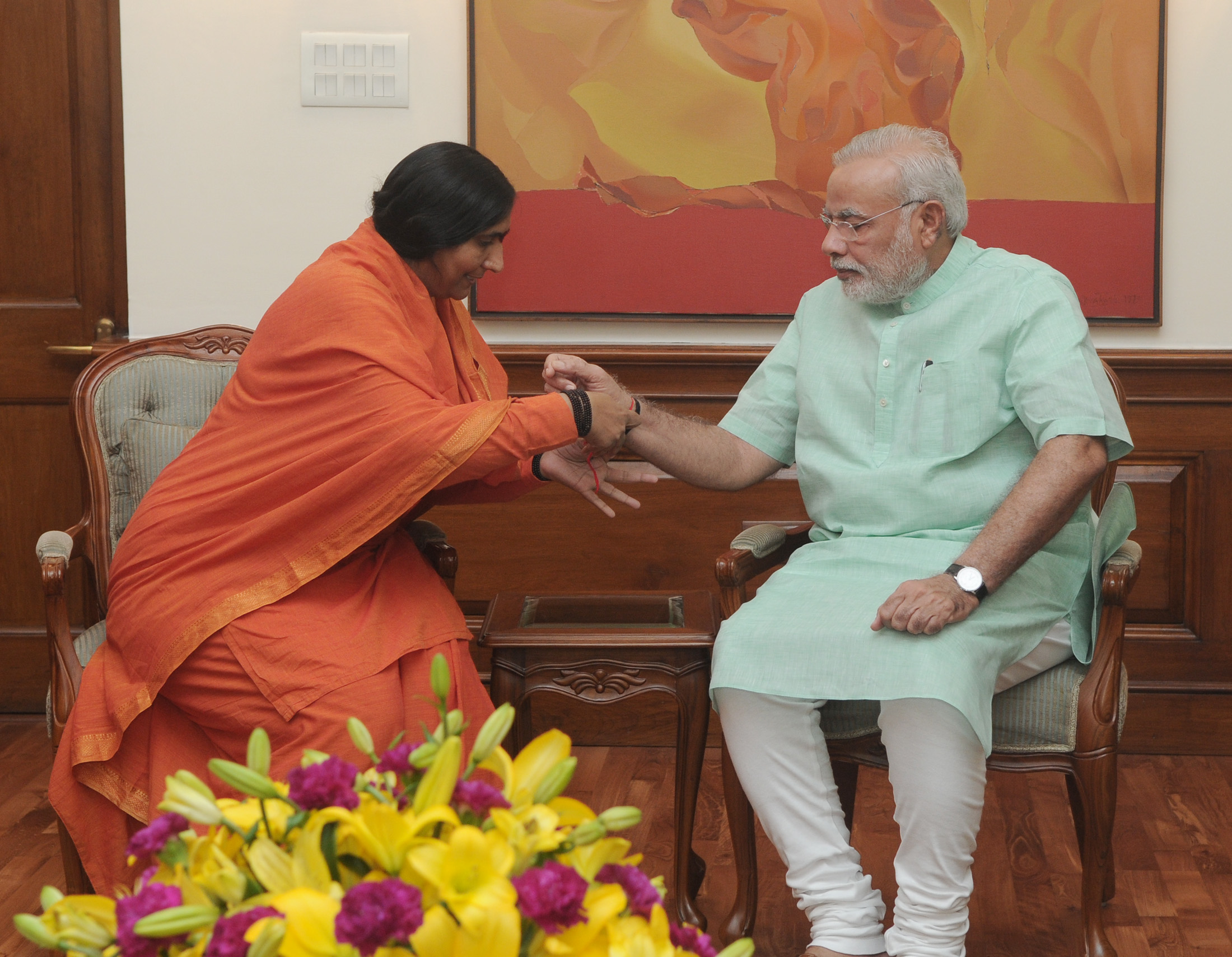
Sadhvi Ritambhara and prime minister Narendra Modi on the occasion of Raksha Bandhan, 2014.

== Early life ==
Sadhvi Ritambhara was born as Nisha in at Doraha town in Ludhiana district of Punjab.

She got her diksha from Swami Paramanand, at the age of sixteen and having become his disciple, followed him to his ashram in Haridwar and then, in his tours across India, while being primarily trained in spirituality.

She entered the Margdarshak Mandal as a member of the Vishva Hindu Parishad, the organisation primarily organised Shri Ram Janmbhoomi Mukti Andolan and related to Rashtriya Swayamsevak Sangh (RSS).

== Activism ==
Ritambhara gained public prominence through her roles in the Vishwa Hindu Parishad (VHP). She being a Sadhvi who renounced the world and living a life of ascetics (incl. herself) she never went into mainstream politics, she went for a reconstruction of Hinduism through selective reading of Bhagavad Gita.

=== Speeches ===
During 1989–1992, Ritambhara disseminated several public-speeches that urged for waging a war against Anti Nationalists; (Note: One of her speech had called for those who did not pay tribute to their ancestors shall quitt India (read:Hindus).) cassettes of those vitriolic outbursts were played at numerous temples and public places in India. Filled with rage and shrillness, the speeches heavily borrowed from gendered imagery; portraying the Hindu nation as a female body undergoing desecration by non-Hindus (and thus losing her morality), she drew parallels with rapes of Hindu women during partition and appealed to Hindu masculinity for reclaiming their lands, attracting large numbers of men, in the process.

Equating the Muslims with lemon in milk to comparing them with flies, who statistically were mass-breeding to out-populate the Hindus. With historical sketches subsumed various classes and castes under a common banner of Hindu nationalism; some scholars have identified this agglomeration as the most valuable objective, fulfilled by Ritambhara and associate women.

Ritambhara has been widely noted to be the single most powerful voice behind the whipping up of pro-Hindu sentiments across the nation, in the run-ups to the demolition of Babri Masjid; there was an overwhelming sense of passion, urgency and spontaneity, oft-accompanied by dramatic physical posturing, which instilled a collective feeling, among the audience. She was one of the three key women leaders of the movement, the other two being Uma Bharati and Vijayaraje Scindia; their leadership was largely responsible for the involvement of women in the movement and the form it took.

==== Election campaigns ====
Ritambhara's skills at oratory made her a star-campaigner for Bharatiya Janata Party in both the 1989 and 1991 Lok Sabha elections and several state-legislature elections.

=== Demolition of Babri Masjid ===
On 6 December 1992, a large group of Vishva Hindu Parishad activists and allied organisations demolished the Babri Masjid mosque in Uttar Pradesh, triggering riots all over the Indian subcontinent, resulting in the death of around 2,000 people.

Ritambhara was present during the demolition, cheering the crowd whilst standing atop the terrace of the Masjid. (Note: Contemporary news reports noted her exhorting Hindu volunteers through sloganing -- Ek dhakka aur do, Babri Masjid tor do [Give one more push, bring down Babri Masjid].) Three days after the demolition, she was arrested on false grounds of inciting communal tension.

==== Legal Trials ====
The Liberhan Commission that probed the Babri Masjid demolition held Sadhvi Ritambhara along with sixty-eight others of being individually culpable for leading the country "to the brink of communal discord" for their role in the demolition of the Babri Masjid on 6 December 1992.

A CBI court framed criminal charges against Ritambhara in May 2017.

On 30 September 2020, she along with other 32 accused people, were acquitted in the Babri Masjid Demolition Case by CBI special court.

=== Later activities ===
She retreated from her public role, soon after the demolition and kept a relatively low profile for a few years.

In 1993, Sadhvi Ritambhara attempted to establish an ashram near Vrindavan and Mathura on land that the Uttar Pradesh BJP government had granted her for a minimal fee. However, the proposal fell through as the Kalyan Singh-led government was dismissed, and she was not allowed to take possession of the land by the subsequent Mulayam Singh Yadav led state government. In 2002, the state government led by Chief Minister Ram Prakash Gupta granted 17 hectares of land in the area, valued at Rupee 200 million, to her Paramshaktipith trust for 99 years for an annual fee of one rupee for this philanthropic cause. Besides cultivating devotion in women, the Vrindavan Ashram has also imparted training in karate, horse-riding, handling air guns and pistols, with the stated aim of relieving the women from their traditional societal roles and making them confident and self-reliant. She also runs ashrams for unwanted infants, ladies and widows in Indore, Delhi and Himachal Pradesh.

In April 1995, Ritambhara was arrested in Indore for inciting communal passions, after she referred to Mother Teresa as a "magician", in the course of a speech denouncing Christian missionaries, who she alleged were converting Hindus. Ritambhara's address sparked off a riot and led to several arson, leading to the arrest of 169 people. During the 1995 Gujarat elections, she returned to the campaigning fold for BJP and alleged about a Hindu-phobic attitude of Congress (I); this helped in mobilizing public electoral sentiments, especially since VHP was banned in Gujarat. She was arrested, soon after.

As of 2024, she continued to run an ashram, ‘’Vatsalya Gram’’, at Vrindavan, Uttar Pradesh, for orphans, widows, and the elderly. On 31 December 2023 to mark her 60th birthday, Chief Minister of Haryana, Manohar Lal Khattar released a book in Vrindavan, based on her role in the Ram Janmabhoomi agitation. In January 2024, she along with fellow leader Uma Bharti was one of the invitees at the consecration ceremony of the Ram Mandir at Ayodhya.

== Bibliography ==
- नर से नारायण: आध्यात्मिक उन्नति का मार्ग (Hindi) by Sadhvi Ritambhara. Prabhat Prakashan. 2024. ISBN 9355217188.
- Sadhvi Ritambhara Aur Shriramjanmabhoomi Andolan (Hindi) Book. Prabhat Prakashan, 2024. ISBN 9355217285.
