= Hedgewar Smruti Mandir =

Memorial in Nagpur, Maharashtra, India

Coordinates: 21°08′06″N 79°06′39″E

Hedgewar Smruti Mandir (HSM) is a memorial in Reshimbagh, Nagpur, Maharashtra, India dedicated to K. B. Hedgewar and M. S. Golwalkar, who were the first two leaders of the Rashtriya Swayamsevak Sangh (RSS). It was inaugurated in 1962. It was granted tourism status on the recommendation of the Maharashtra Tourism Development Corporation (MTDC) in 2017, but this decision is mired in controversy.

== History ==
K. B. Hedgewar was the founder of the RSS. When he died in 1940, his final rites were performed at the RSS headquarters in Reshimbagh, and an unassuming samadhi (memorial) was built there. It was inaugurated on 9 April 1962 by M. S. Golwalkar who was Hedgewar's immediate successor. When M. S. Golwalkar died, his memorial was also constructed there. The Dr. Hedgewar Smarak Samiti, an independent society registered under the Societies Act, maintains the memorial.

== Controversy over tourism status ==
The Nagpur Municipal Corporation (NMC) approved money for the development of the memorial on 12 September 2017. The NMC has proposed construction of a road and a compound wall in Reshimbagh at a cost of ₹ 1.37 crore, but this is a controversial decision and has been contested. A public interest litigation was filed to challenge this decision claiming that public money cannot be spent on the development of a private area. Subsequently, it received a C-grade tourism status on the recommendation of the Maharashtra Tourism Development Corporation (MTDC) and the district planning committee. The MTDC added the memorial to a list of places to visit in Nagpur Darshan for the large number of people visiting during Vijayadashami and other occasions. This decision by the MTDC is under court consideration because of the public interest litigation. It is Nagpur's first memorial and 9th location to be granted tourism status.
