= Durga Vahini =

Indian political organisation

- Official Logo of Durga Vahini
- Formation: 1991; 35 years ago
- Purpose: Women's wing of Vishva Hindu Parishad
- Headquarters: New Delhi, India
- Region served: India
- Official language: Hindi
- Parent organisation: Vishwa Hindu Parishad
- Affiliations: Sangh Parivar
- Website: vhp.org/durga_vahini/

Durga Vahini (ISO: Durgā Vāhīnī, lit. 'Battalion of Durga') is the women's wing of the Vishva Hindu Parishad (VHP). It was established in 1991 and its founding chairperson is Sadhvi Rithambara. The Vishva Hindu Parishad states the purpose of the Durga Vahini is to empower women, encourage more women to participate in spiritual and cultural activities. Kalpana Vyash, a senior leader of the organisation, said that the Durga Vahini members dedicate themselves "to physical, mental and intellectual development". The aim of the organisation is to establish Hindu solidarity by helping Hindu families during the time of hardship and by providing social services. According to Vyash, the total membership of the group is 8,000 as of 2002, and 1,000 members are from Ahmedabad.

== Activities and ideology ==
The Durga Vahini is often considered to be the female face of the Bajrang Dal. The organisation is described as a right-wing religious fundamentalist group.

The Durga Vahini recruits young women for activism of a militant nature. It targets women from underprivileged caste backgrounds and poorer families, but retains a corps of members whose families have a lengthy history of involvement with the group. Members learn karate and lathi khela, and receive ideological education. Analysing the role of women in the Hindu nationalist movement, scholar Thomas Blom Hansen writes that the RSS is more willing to expose women of lower-caste backgrounds to physical danger, and believes that the Durga Vahini is likely to become popular among lower-caste women because they desire to emulate upper-caste values.

In the Bijnor riot in 1990, activists belonging to the Durga Vahini allegedly organised a procession of Hindu men through the Muslim quarters of Bijor shouting provocative slogans which started violence.

On 16 March 2002, Durga Vahini activists wielding tridents and sporting saffron headbands arrived at the Orissa Assembly along with VHP and Bajrang Dal members.

The Durga Vahini was alleged to have participated in the 2002 Gujarat violence. Durga Vahini has denied such allegations. Regarding the Durga Vahini's role in the riots, VHP spokesman Kaushikbahi Mehta said, "We in the VHP had nothing to do with the violence except to take care of widows and victims of the Godhra mayhem. So was the case with the Durga Vahini". But many people claimed that white-churidar clad girls were involved in the violence. A senior police official said, "They were found providing healing touch to the male activists, information back-up and if the ethnic cleansing theory is true, I have a feeling they played a significant role in intelligence network as well. While it will be very difficult to prove their direct involvement, women Sanghis had definitely scrutinised voters' list or the traders' licence papers to screen the minorities with an innocuous intention".

Six members of the Durga Vahini were arrested in Gwalior in March 2004 for blackening the face of Neetu Sapra, director of the play Kal Aaj Aur Kal. The Vishva Hindu Parishad and the Bajrang Dal claimed the play depicted Rama, Sita, Lakshmana and Hanuman in "indecent" way. The activists also damaged the furnitures in Sapra's home.

In July 2017, Durga Vahini organised a training camp for self-defence in Jammu & Kashmir, girls from 17 border towns of the state participated in the camp.

== See also ==
- The World Before Her, a 2012 documentary partly chronicling the training at a Durga Vahini camp
- Rashtra Sevika Samiti
