= Giriraj Kishore =

Hindu nationalist activist

Acharya Giriraj Kishore
- Born: 4 February 1920
- Died: 13 July 2014 (aged 94)
- Known for: Vishva Hindu Parishad

Acharya Giriraj Kishore (4 February 1920 – 13 July 2014) was an Indian activist representing Hindu nationalism. He served as senior vice-president of Vishwa Hindu Parishad, the religious wing of the Hindu nationalist Sangh Parivar.

== Life ==
Kishore was from Etah Village Misauli near Jalesar. He had done his master's degree in Hindi literature, history and political science. As a school teacher in the town of Morena, he caught the attention of Vijayaraje Scindia, a prominent leader of the Bharatiya Janata Party from the region. Mrs. Scindia, whose sympathies lay with VHP, gave him a start in the organisation during the Ram Janmabhoomi agitation, with which he came to be closely associated. He acted as joint general secretary, general secretary and senior vice president of the International wing of the Vishva Hindu Parishad.

Kishore died on 13 July 2014 at RK Puram, New Delhi. He donated his body to medical college for social cause.
