= Babasaheb Apte =

Indian paramilitant

Umakant Keshav Apte (29 April 1903 - 1971), also known as Babasaheb Apte, was one of the first pracharaks (full-time propagators) of the Hindu nationalist organisation Rashtriya Swayamsevak Sangh (RSS), taking initiation from its founder K. B. Hedgewar. Upon his death, the Babasaheb Apte Smarak Samiti was set up in his honour by RSS pracharak Moropant Pingle, which has been active in commissioning and publishing research on the history of ancient India.

== Life ==
Apte was born on 29 April 1903 into a Chitpavan Brahmin family in Vidarbha and was said to have been infused with patriotism from a young age. His father died in 1919 and he started working as a teacher right after matriculation. However, he resigned from the job when his headmaster prohibited from celebrating Bal Gangadhar Tilak's death anniversary. In 1924, he moved to Nagpur and joined the press of the Udyam magazine. He formed a Vidyarthi Mandal (student society) for discussing revolutionary ideas. Hedgewar visited the organisation in 1925 and provided enough inspiration to Apte for him to merge his fledgling organisation with the RSS. In 1927, he became one of the first people to become an RSS pracharak, even before the term itself was coined.

== Activism ==
Apte was instrumental in spreading the network of the RSS shakhas (local branches) in Maharashtra in the early 1930s and, later, in the rest of the country. He became a key assistant to Hedgewar in the coordination of the RSS pracharak network. He travelled continuously and provided a special kind of help to the pracharaks by identifying and meeting persons of importance to win their patronage for the RSS shakhas. He toured the Punjab province in 1935 and established contacts with both the Hindu Mahasabha and Arya Samaj, laying the ground work for the spread of the RSS in Punjab.

Apte died in 1971. He was honoured by RSS as a karmayogi. To commemorate his keen interest in rewriting Indian history in the mould of Hindutva as well as popularising Sanskrit, Moropant Pingley set up Babasaheb Apte Smarak Samiti in 1973 for commissioning and publishing books on these topics. This organisation in due course gave rise the all-India organisation Akhil Bharatiya Itihas Sankalan Yojana. The RSS has also instituted a "Baba Saheb Apte Birth Centenary National Sanskrit Award" given annually in recognition of efforts for promoting Sanskrit.

== Bibliography ==
- Jaffrelot, Christophe (1996). The Hindu Nationalist Movement and Indian Politics. C. Hurst & Co. Publishers. ISBN 978-1850653011.
- Sahasrabuddhe, P. G. (1982). Karmayogi Babasaheb Apte (in Hindi). Nagpur: Phejpurker.
