= K. B. Hedgewar =

Indian activist and physician (1889–1940)

Keshav Baliram Hedgewar
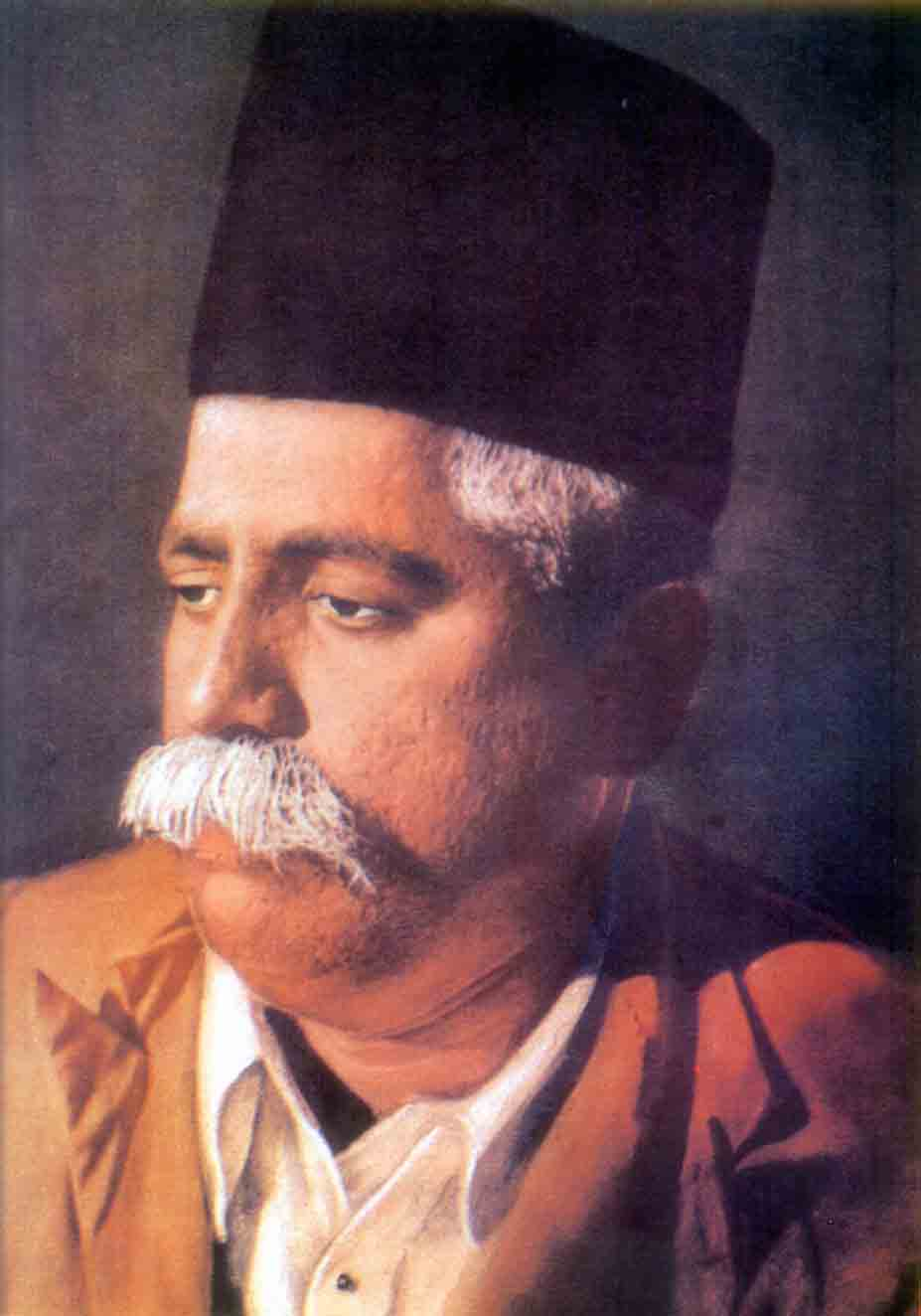

1st Sarsanghchalak of the Rashtriya Swayamsevak Sangh
- In office 27 September 1925 – 21 June 1940
- Preceded by: Position established
- Succeeded by: M. S. Golwalkar

Personal details
- Born: 1 April 1889 Nagpur, Central Provinces and Berar, British India(Currently in Maharashtra State, India)
- Died: 21 June 1940 (aged 51) Nagpur, Central Provinces and Berar, British India
- Party: Indian National Congress (1919–1923); Hindu Mahasabha
- Education: Medical College & Hospital, Calcutta
- Occupation: Physician; political activist
- Known for: Founder of the Rashtriya Swayamsevak Sangh

Keshav Baliram Hedgewar (1 April 1889 – 21 June 1940) was an Indian physician who founded the Rashtriya Swayamsevak Sangh (RSS), a right-wing Hindutva paramilitary organisation, in Nagpur in 1925. He was also known as Doctorji.

== Early life ==
Hedgewar was born on 1 April 1889 in a Deshastha Brahmin family in Nagpur, Central Provinces and Berar. His great-grandfather Narhar Shastri migrated from Kandakurthi, Nizamabad district in present-day Telangana to Nagpur. His parents were Baliram Pant Hedgewar and Revatibai, a Marathi couple of modest means. When Hedgewar was thirteen, both of his parents died in the plague epidemic of 1902. Hedgewar's uncle ensured that he continued to receive a good education, and B. S. Moonje became a patron and a father-figure for the young Hedgewar.

He studied at Neel City High School in Nagpur, from where he was expelled singing "Vande Mataram" in violation of the circular issued by the then British colonial government. As a result, he had to pursue his high school studies at the Rashtriya Vidyalaya in Yavatmal and later in Pune. After matriculating, he was sent to Kolkata by B. S. Moonje (a member of the Indian National Congress, who later became the President of the Hindu Mahasabha) in 1910 to pursue his medical studies. After passing the L.M.S. Examination from the Calcutta Medical College in June 1916, he completed a yearlong apprenticeship and returned to Nagpur in 1917 as a physician.

== Ideological roots ==
During his education in Calcutta, Hedgewar joined the Anushilan Samiti in Bengal, which was influenced deeply by the writings of Bankim Chandra Chatterjee. Hedgewar's initiation into this group, rooted in Hindu symbolism, was an important step in his path towards creating the RSS. Hedgewar was influenced equally by the likes of Vinayak Damodar Savarkar's ideological pamphlet Essentials of Hindutva. Hedgewar was also highly influenced by Samarth Ramdas's Dasbodh and Lokamanya Tilak's Geeta Rahasya. His letters often bore quotes from Tukaram.

== Formation of RSS ==
Hedgewar participated in the Indian National Congress in the 1920s, but he became disillusioned with their policies and politics. He had been an active member of the party's volunteer division – Hindustani Seva Dal, the predecessor of the Congress Seva Dal. He was deeply influenced by the writings of Lokmanya Bal Gangadhar Tilak, Vinayak Damodar Savarkar, Ganesh Damodar Savarkar, Sri Aurobindo and B. S. Moonje. He also read Mazzini and other enlightenment philosophers. Between 1912 and 1922, Hedgewar developed a critique largely of the Hindu society, where he diagnosed the problem as India's fragmented society caused by caste, class and creed. He wanted to remove caste from Indian society "lock, stock, and barrel". He did nevertheless consider that the cultural and religious heritage of Hindus should be the basis of Indian nationhood, hence his pivot towards cultural nationalism.

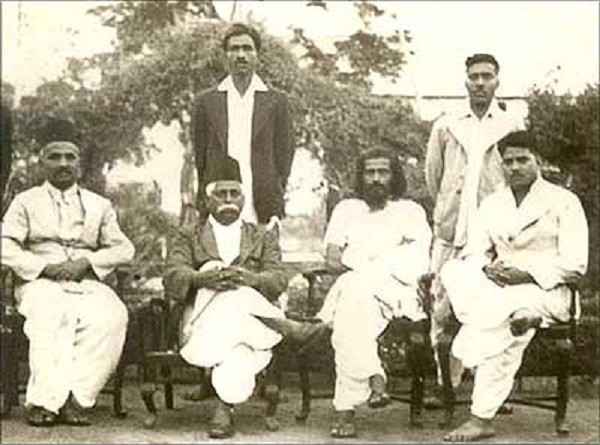
Hedgewar and his initial followers during an RSS meeting in 1939

Hedgewar founded RSS in 1925 on the day of Vijayadashami with an aim to organise the Hindu society for its cultural regeneration and make it a tool for achieving complete independence for a united India. From the Hedgewarian perspective "to organise" meant something akin to what Prof. Robert Putnam called Social Capital. Hedgewar suggested the term 'Rashtriya' (national) for his Hindu organisation, for he wanted to re-assert the Hindu identity with 'Rashtriya'. Hedgewar supported the setting up of a women's wing of the organisation in 1936 called Rashtra Sevika Samiti.

Those that participated in the movement were called Swayamsevaks (meaning volunteers). Early Swayamsevaks included Bhaiyaji Dani, Babasaheb Apte, M. S. Golwalkar, Balasaheb Deoras, and Madhukar Rao Bhagwat, among others. The Sangh (Community) was growing in Nagpur and the surrounding districts, and it soon began to spread to other provinces. Hedgewar travelled extensively across Central, North and West India to set up RSS shakhas and inspire young people to join the Sangh.

== Later political activities ==
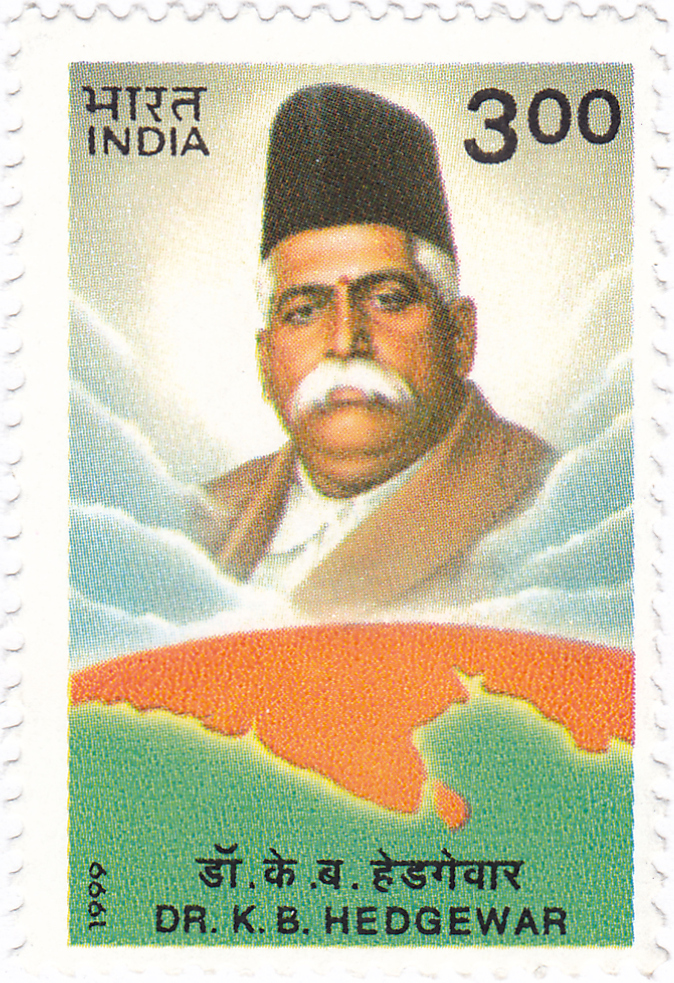
Hedgewar on a 1999 stamp of India

After founding the Rashtriya Swayamsevak Sangh in 1925, Hedgewar maintained a healthy distance from the Indian Independence movement as led by Gandhi. Instead he encouraged local Swayamsevaks to participate on their own accord with the struggle. Hedgewar was actively discouraging RSS cadres to not join the movement which was led by Gandhi. The RSS biographer C. P. Bhishikar states, "after establishing Sangh, Doctor Saheb in his speeches used to talk only of Hindu organisation. Direct comment on (British) Government used to be almost nil."

When the Congress passed the Purna Swaraj resolution in its Lahore session in December 1929, and called upon all Indians to celebrate 26 January 1930 as Independence Day, Hedgewar issued a circular asking all the RSS shakhas to observe the occasion through hoisting the Bhagwa Dhwaj (saffron flag), rather than the Tricolour. Nandha, the author of Hedgewar: a definitive biography published by Penguin Random House claims, that first the Bhagwa Dhwaj represents India's culture for the RSS, and that a report commissioned by the Indian National Congress, unanimously concluded that the national flag of an independent India should be kesari with an Ashoka chakra in the corner. This conclusion was vetoed by Gandhi and never saw the light of day. Hedgewar and the RSS disagreed with Gandhi. 1930 was the only year when the RSS celebrated 26 January and it stopped the practice from the next year onwards. However, such celebration became a standard feature of the freedom movement and often came to mean violent confrontation with the official police. C. P. Bhishikar states,

[In April 1930], Mahatma Gandhi gave a call for 'Satyagraha' against the British Government. Gandhi himself launched the Salt Satyagraha undertaking his Dandi Yatra. Dr. Hedgewar decided to participate only individually and not let the RSS join the freedom movement officially. He sent information everywhere that the Sangh will not participate in the Satyagraha. However those wishing to participate individually in it were not prohibited.

Hedgewar emphasised that he participated in the Civil Disobedience movement of 1930 in an individual capacity, and not as a RSS member. His concern was to keep the RSS out of the political arena. According to Hedgewar's biography, when Gandhi launched the Salt Satyagraha in 1930, he sent information everywhere that the RSS will not participate in the Satyagraha. However those wishing to participate individually in it were not prohibited.

Hedgewar saw the RSS as a tool to rebuild the social capital that had evaporated from Hindu society at-large. He did not wish for the RSS to engage in the day-to-day politics of his times. He distinguished between personal choice and organisational focus. Individuals, that is Swayamsevaks were free to choose to what extent they wanted to struggle for freedom from British tyranny, but the RSS was only focused on social capital through its shakhas.

== Death and legacy ==
His health deteriorated in later years of his life. Often he suffered from chronic back pain. He started delegating his responsibilities to M. S. Golwalkar, who later succeeded him as Sarsanghchalak of RSS. In January 1940, he was taken to Rajgir in Bihar for the hot-spring treatment.

He attended the annual Sangh Shiksha Varg (officer training camp) in 1940, where he gave his last message to Swayamsevaks, saying: "I see before my eyes today a miniature Hindu Rashtra." He died on the morning of 21 June 1940 in Nagpur. His last rites were performed in the locality of Resham Bagh in Nagpur, which was later developed as Hedgewar Smruti Mandir.

Former PM Atal Bihari Vajpayee described Hedgewar as a great patriot, freedom fighter and nationalist during his commemoration on a postal stamp in 1999. Hedgewar was described as "a great son of Mother India" by former President of India Pranab Mukherjee during his visit to Hedgewar's birthplace in Nagpur.

=== Establishments named after Hedgewar ===
- Dr. Hedgewar Institute Of Medical Sciences & Research, Amravati
- Dr. Hedgewar Shikshan Pratishthan, Ahmednagar
- Dr. Hedgewar Aarogya Sansthan, Karkardooma, New Delhi
- Hedgewar Hospital, Aurangabad, Maharashtra
- Keshav Srushti, Bhayandar, Thane, Maharashtra
- Hedgewar Smruti Mandir, Nagpur, Maharashtra

== See also ==
- Gopal Mukund Huddar
