= Vishva Hindu Parishad =

Hindu nationalist organisation

- Logo of the V.H.P, depicting a Banyan tree and the slogan dharmo rakṣati rakṣitaḥ
- Abbreviation: VHP
- Formation: 29 August 1964; 62 years ago
- Founder: M. S. Golwalkar; S. S. Apte; Swami Chinmayananda
- Type: Right-wing
- Purpose: Hindutva, Hindu nationalism, and pan-Dharmic religions
- Headquarters: New Delhi, India
- Coordinates: 28.33°N 77.10°E
- Region served: Worldwide
- Official language: Hindi
- International President: Rabindra Narain Singh
- International Working President: Alok Kumar Advocate
- Subsidiaries: Bajrang Dal; Durga Vahini
- Affiliations: Sangh Parivar
- Website: vhp.org

Vishva Hindu Parishad (VHP; lit. 'World Council of Hindus') is an Indian right-wing Hindutva organisation. The VHP was founded in 1964 by M. S. Golwalkar and S. S. Apte in collaboration with Swami Chinmayananda. The VHP is a member of the Sangh Parivar, a group of Hindutva organisations. formed and led by the Rashtriya Swayamsevak Sangh (RSS). The VHP has been criticised for contributing to violence against Muslims in India, most notably for its role in the demolition of the Babri Masjid and the 2002 Gujarat riots.

== History ==
The VHP was founded in 1964 by RSS leaders M. S. Golwalkar and S. S. Apte in collaboration with the Hindu spiritual leader Chinmayananda Saraswati. According to Chinmayananda, the objective of the VHP was to awaken Hindus to their place in the comity of nations.

Chinmayananda was nominated as its founding President, while Apte was nominated as its founding General Secretary. It was decided at the meeting that the name of the proposed organisation would be "Vishva Hindu Parishad" and that a world convention of Hindus was to be held at Prayag (Allahabad) during the Kumbh Mela of 1966 for its launch. It was further decided that it would be a non-political organisation and that no office bearer of any political party shall be simultaneously an office bearer in the Parishad. The delegation of the founders also included Bharatiya Vidya Bhavan founder K. M. Munshi, Gujarati scholar Keshavram Kashiram Shastri, Sikh leader Tara Singh, Namdhari Sikh leader Satguru Jagjit Singh and eminent politicians such as C. P. Ramaswami Iyer.

In the mid-1990s, VHP had 1.6 million members worldwide. According to a 2008 estimate, VHP claimed 6.8 million members.

== Ideology ==
The VHP was first mooted at a conference in Pawai, Sandipani Sadhanalaya, Bombay on 29 August 1964. The conference was hosted by RSS chief M. S. Golwalkar. The date was chosen to coincide with the festival of Janmashtami. Several representatives from the Hindu, Sikh, Buddhist and Jain faiths were present in the meeting, as well as the Dalai Lama. Golwalkar explained that "all faiths of Indian origins need to unite", saying that the word "Hindu" (people of "Hindustan") also applied to adherents of all the above religions. Apte declared:

The world has been divided to Christian, Islam and communist. All of them view Hindu society as very fine rich food on which to feast and fatten themselves. It is necessary in this age of conflict to think of and organise the Hindu world to save it from the evils of all the three.

Its main objective is "to organise, consolidate the Hindu society and to serve, protect the Hindu Dharma". It has been involved in social service projects and in encouraging the construction and renovation of Hindu temples. It is against the caste system, and opposes cow slaughter. Defending Hindus around the world and Hindu rights has been one of its stated objectives. The VHP considers Buddhists, Jains and Sikhs as well as native tribal religions as part of the greater Hindu fraternity.

The VHP promotes the education and involvement of members of Hindu diaspora in their "cultural duties and spiritual values." This view was first promoted by Chinmayananda, and is reflected in the promulgation of VHP organisations in Indo-Caribbean countries Trinidad and Tobago, Guyana and Suriname.

The organisation acts under the guidance from Dharma Sansad, a religious parliament of Gurus.

== Religious conversion ==
The VHP is against religious conversion away from Hinduism, and uses trained members known as Dharma Prasaar Vibhag (Dharma Propagation Unit) to meet their ends. The VHP also provides means for reconversion back to Hinduism. From 1982 to 1985, over 66,000 people were reconverted to Hinduism following the efforts of VHP.

VHP claimed to have converted 5,000 people to Hinduism in 2002. In 2004, VHP claimed to have converted 12,857 people to Hinduism. 3,727 of these were Muslims and 9,130 were Christians.

In Punjab, the VHP has played an active role to prevent conversions of Sikhs. Majority of them are low caste Sikhs converting to Christianity. This may be a result of oppression by high caste Sikhs but there are considerable free will conversions among the higher class Sikhs too; however, the VHP have forcibly stopped Christian missionaries from converting Sikhs.

VHP engaged in "re-conversion" program in the state of Orissa. In June 2002, VHP converted 143 tribal Christians into Hinduism in Tainser village of Sundergarh district. In 2005, VHP in Bargarh carried out reconversion ceremony for 567 Christians. The new converts had signed affidavits, confirming their intention to change their religion. Another 600 Dalit tribal Christians were converted to Hinduism in Bijepur, Odisha.

In April 2005, in West Bengal members of 45 tribal families converted to Hinduism from Christianity in a ceremony organised by Akhil Bhartiya Sanatan Santhal, allied to VHP.

In March 2021, a Freedom to Religion Bill was passed in Madhya Pradesh, and the VHP plans to organise for action in other states.

=== Beti Bachao Bahu Lao ===
Beti Bachao Bahu Lao is a campaign planned by the Vishva Hindu Parishad (VHP) and its affiliates Bajrang Dal etc., that claimed to marry young Muslim girls to Hindu men.

In 2016, journalist Rahul Kotiyal of Scroll.in was awarded Ramnath Goenka Award for reporting on a campaign by RSS and Bajrang Dal named "Beti Bachao, Bahu Lao". The campaign attempted to stop Hindu girls from marrying non-Hindus. If RSS members get information of a Hindu girl planning to marry a Muslim man, then the RSS members would track the girl and would inform the parents of the girl accusing this to be a case of Love Jihad.

== Litigation ==
In 2005, after the protests organised by VHP, the Jharkhand Legislative Assembly passed a Cow Protection Commission Bill that made the killing of, cruelty to and illegal trading of cows a crime.

In 2007, VHP had launched nationwide protest against demolition of the Rama Setu. On 12 September 2007, the VHP, with the aid of BJP and the Rameswaram Sreeramsetu Surakshaya Manch, had blocked road and rail traffic in Orissa. Thousands of activists participated in these protests in Bhubaneswar, Jatani, Rourkela, and Sambalpur.

== Youth organisations ==
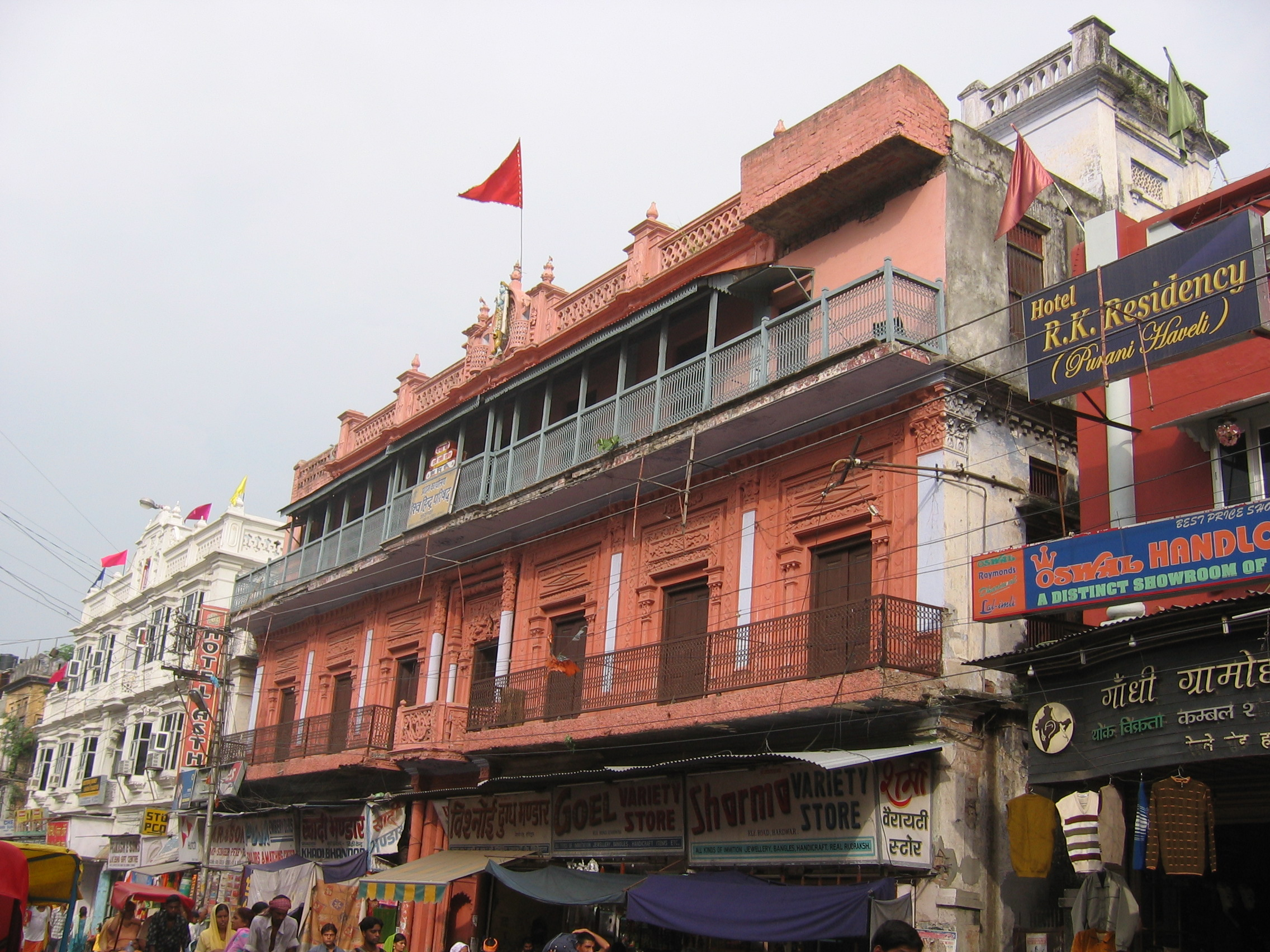
Local office of Vishva Hindu Parishad, at Haridwar

The Bajrang Dal founded in 1984, is organised in many states in major training camps called shakhas, where thousands of youths simultaneously train in various activities, receive sports, education in Hindutva and cultural indoctrination. The Durga Vahini, founded in 1991 under the tutelage of Sadhvi Rithambara as its founding chairperson and the support of the VHP, is described as the "female arm of the Dal". Members of the Vahini contend that the portrayal of their group as a branch of the Bajrang Dal is an oversimplification, and that their goals are to "dedicate ourselves to spiritual, physical, mental and knowledge development". The VHP also have divisions made up of women. VHP secretary Giri Raj Kishore charted out highly visible roles for women in the group. He charted out two "satyagrahas" for women during their demonstrations.

The VHP has been a prime backer of the World Hindu Conference in which issues such as casteism, sectarianism, and the future of Hindus were discussed. Prior Conferences have included Hindu Groups such as Parisada Hindu Dharma.

== International presence ==
Vishwa Hindu Parishad has presence in 29 countries outside of India. The Australia wing of Vishva Hindu Parishad conducts activities such as conducting weekend schools, language classes, cultural workshops, festivals. The festivals are also organised for open to all communities promoting Unity in Diversity. The press release from city council of Holroyd states that Vishva Hindu Parishad is active in supporting multiculturalism in the same region.

The VHPA founded the Hindu Students Council (also known as HSC) in the US and Canada in 1990. HSC leaders have later taken-up leadership roles in the VHPA.

== Violence ==
The VHP has been associated with violence on a number of occasions.

The VHP had been actively involved in the Ayodhya dispute over the Ram Janmabhoomi, or Babri Masjid before its demolition, since March 1984, after getting encouraged by the strong response it had got from ekatmata yatra ("journey of unity") programme it organised in 1983, which the VHP described as being aimed at Hindu unity and defence against alleged assault from Islam and Christianity. This activity in the Ayodhya issue involved demonstrations, petitions and litigation, along with militant processions, vociferous (re)conversion ceremonies (ghar wapisi) and incidents of violence and vandalism, particularly targeting Muslims. The VHP is also said to have sought the destruction of the Babri mosque. According to the VHP and its affiliated organisations, the Babri Mosque was built by demolishing the temple at the birthplace of Rama (Ram Janmabhoomi) by the Mughal Emperor Babur in early 16th century. It further stated in Allahabad court documentation that the building was in a dilapidated condition. It was in ruins and could not be used for worship or any activities. In 1989, the VHP, keeping in view the impending Lok Sabha elections, organised a massive movement to start the construction of a Ram temple at the disputed site. The BJP-VHP organised a huge rally of 200,000 volunteers at this site on 6 December 1992 and set out to demolish the mosque.

According to the Human Rights Watch, the VHP and Bajrang Dal, in collaboration with BJP had been involved in 2002 Gujarat riots. Though VHP has denied these claims, VHP spokesman Kaushikbahi Mehta said, "We in the VHP had nothing to do with the violence except to take care of widows and victims of the Godhra mayhem."

In 2015, VHP defended the demolition of a church in Haryana, although it has denied involvement in the incident. VHP joint general secretary Surendra Jain alleged that the church was built "for the purpose of aggressive conversion" and likened its destruction to the violence of the 1857 war which he claimed "was fought for the cause of religion".

On 4 June 2018, the VHP was classified as a militant religious organisation by the CIA in its World Factbook's entry for India, under the category of political pressure groups, along with Bajrang Dal. The VHP reportedly explored legal options to have this tag removed. The World Factbook removed the mentions of the VHP and the Bajrang Dal from the entry by 25 June 2018.

== Controversies ==
The Vishva Hindu Parishad has been involved in several controversies. This includes violence against minority religious groups as well as scheduled caste/tribe communities. The Vishva Hindu Parishad has also faced flak for acts of moral policing.

In 2002, following the Godhra train burning, VHP demanded a statewide bandh in the state of Gujarat. Several VHP leaders were involved in the 2002 Gujarat riots that followed, targeting Muslim communities statewide.

The VHP leader, Pravin Togadia, was arrested in April 2003 after distributing tridents to Bajrang Dal activists in Ajmer, defying a ban and prohibitory orders. He asserted that the coming Assembly polls in the Indian state of Rajasthan would be fought on the issue of tridents and attacked the ruling Indian National Congress Party for "placating" Muslims for electoral gains. He expressed satisfaction at the publicity received due to the incident.

The VHP has been criticised for moral policing against couples celebrating Valentine's Day. Calling it a western attack on Indian culture, the VHP and Bajrang Dal activists have been accused of threatening and intimidating couples for celebrating Valentine's Day.

In August 2013, the Vishwa Hindu Parishad came out in support of Asaram, a spiritual leader, after he was arrested for the rape of a minor. Ashok Singhal and Pravin Togadia, presidents of Vishwa Hindu Parishad, deemed the arrest to be an attack on Hindu religious sentiments, and along with Akhil Bharatiya Vidyarthi Parishad, the student wing of the RSS, and the Hindu Jagruti Manch organised violent demonstrations across the country, in protest. The family of the victim alleged then that they received threats from Asaram's followers and Vishwa Hindu Parishad activists wanting the charges against him dropped, while also intimidating witnesses and eventually murdering them. Asaram was convicted in April 2018 and sentenced to life imprisonment on the charges of rape.

On 2 November 2014, during the Kiss of Love protest against moral policing, members of Bajrang Dal, Shiv Sena, Vishwa Hindu Parishad and many other right wing groups opposed and attacked protestors and threatened to strip protestors for kissing on the streets. These opposing groups claimed that public display of affection is against both Indian culture and the law of the land (under section 294 of the Indian Penal Code), though according to the Supreme Court and the Delhi High Court, kissing in public is not a criminal offence. Police took many of the Kiss of Love protestors into custody to save their lives, but were blamed for giving a free hand to counter protestors of the right wing groups.

From 2015, Bajrang Dal and Vishwa Hindu Parishad have been accused of promoting and indulging in Cow vigilantism, apparently targeting Muslims and lower caste Hindus, mostly Dalits. Human rights groups have slammed several state Governments for promoting and supporting such acts, even turning a blind eye. Police officers have been threatened by members of cow protection groups for intervening in such cases or arresting cow vigilantes. Following the Una Flogging incident in Gujarat, where four dalits were brutally thrashed by Bajrang Dal goons and vigilantes when they were skinning dead cow carcasses, the victims converted to Buddhism. The conversion irked some perpetrators, who attacked the victims for the second time after being out on bail.

On 15 August 2022, the eleven men sentenced to life imprisonment in the Bilkis Bano gangrape case, which occurred during the 2002 Gujarat riots, were released from a Godhra jail by the Gujarat government. Following their release, the rapists were allegedly greeted with garlands from members of Bajrang Dal and Vishva Hindu Parishad. The release and felicitation was criticised by several activists and members of opposition, and the release itself is controversial, because the convicts were released as per the old 1992 Remission Policy instead of the aggressive 2014 Policy. The challenge to release the rapists, which was pending in Supreme Court after a review petition was filed, was dismissed in December 2022, earning criticism from women's safety activists. The Supreme Court, however, redirected the Bombay High Court to look into the case. On 8 January 2024, the Supreme Court bench, led by Justices B.V. Nagarathna and Ujjal Bhuyan, reversed the Gujarat Government's decision and canceled the remission, noting that the convicts were freed erroneously. In its judgement, the bench noted several frauds committed by one of the convicts Radheshyam Bhagwandas Shah, also known as Lala Vakil, who had filed the petition for remission, as he did not declare earlier remission petitions submitted to the Maharashtra State Government, as the trial was transferred to the High Court in Mumbai—the remissions were denied on the recommendation of CBI, as well as the magistrate and Superintendent of Police of Dahod, Gujarat. The Supreme Court eventually ordered the convicts to surrender within two weeks to carry out the remainder of their life sentences.

The Vishwa Hindu Parishad has been a major opponent of LGTBQ rights and describes homosexuality as mental disease. Several VHP activists have violently targeted LGBTQ parades across the country. Following the Supreme Court's judgement in April 2023 on same sex marriages, the VHP welcomed the decision, calling it a Western attack on Indian culture.

Following the decision to add caste as a form of discrimination by the city of Seattle and the state of California in the United States in 2023, VHP leaders and supporters criticised this decision and attempted to stop the legislations to pass the bill. The decision was taken after caste-based discrimination issues in Silicon Valley came to the surface in 2020 with a lawsuit by the State of California against Cisco Systems filed by the California Department of Fair Employment and Housing (DFEH, later named Civil Rights Department). The Department sued Cisco and two of its senior engineers for discrimination against a Dalit engineer (identified as "John Doe"), who alleged that he received lower wages and fewer opportunities because of his caste. On 10 April 2023, the California Civil Rights Department dismissed its case in Superior Court against the two senior engineers.

On 14 February 2024, the Vishva Hindu Parishad and Bajrang Dal intimidated and targeted couples who were celebrating Valentine's Day. Several activists and leaders threatened to resort to violence if clubs, pubs and corporate hotels across Hyderabad did not cancel celebrations for Valentine's Day. As an alternative, the activists asked the youngsters to pay tribute to the soldiers and service-members who were killed in the 2019 Pulwama attack, which was perpetrated by Pakistan-based Islamist terrorist group Jaish-e-Mohammed.

On 2 December 2024, members of Hindu Sangharsh Samity, an organisation affiliated to Vishva Hindu Parishad, attacked the Bangladeshi Assistant High Commission in Agartala, Tripura, vandalising the mission building and desecrating the Bangladeshi flag.

== Bibliography ==
- Clarke, Peter (2004). Encyclopedia of New Religious Movements. Routledge. ISBN 978-0-203-48433-3.
- Jaffrelot, Christophe (2011). Religion, Caste, and Politics in India. C Hurst & Co. ISBN 978-1849041386.
- Juergensmeyer, Mark (1993). The New Cold War? Religious Nationalism Confronts the Secular State. University of California Press. ISBN 978-0-520-08651-7.
- Katju, Manjari (2013). Vishva Hindu Parishad and Indian Politics. Orient Blackswan. ISBN 978-81-250-2476-7.
- Kumar, Praveen (2011). Communal Crimes and National Integration: A Socio-Legal Study. Readworthy Publications. ISBN 978-93-5018-040-2.
- Smith, David James (2003). Hinduism and Modernity. Blackwell Publishing. ISBN 978-0-631-20862-4.
