= Bibliography of the Sangh Parivar =

These are the references for further information regarding the Sangh Parivar.

== Secondary sources ==
=== RSS ===
- Andersen, Walter K.; Damle, Shridhar D. (1987) [Oringally published by Westview Press]. The Brotherhood in Saffron: The Rashtriya Swayamsevak Sangh and Hindu Revivalism. Delhi: Vistaar Publications.
- Curran, Jean Alonzo (1979). Militant Hinduism in Indian Politics: A Study of the R.S.S. All India Quami Ekta Sammelan. ASIN B0006E158G.
- Goyal, Des Raj (1979). Rashtriya Swayamsevak Sangh. Delhi: Radha Krishna Prakashan. ISBN 0836405668.
- Basu, Tapan; Sarkar, Tanika (1993). Khaki Shorts and Saffron Flags: A Critique of the Hindu Right. Orient Longman. ISBN 0863113834.
- Parvathy, A. A. (1994). Secularism and Hindutva, A Discursive Study. Codewood Process & Printing. ASIN B0006F4Y1A.
- Malkani, K. R. (1980). The RSS story. New Delhi: Impex India. ISBN 978-0861864676
- McKean, Lise (1996). Divine Enterprise: Gurus and the Hindu Nationalist Movement. University of Chicago Press. ISBN 0226560090.
- Islam, Shamsul (2000). The Freedom Movement and the RSS: A Story of Betrayal (Third ed.). Joshi-Adhikari Institute of Social Studies. ISBN 8187638028.

=== RSS, Jana Sangh, and BJP ===
- Bhatt, Chetan (2001). Hindu Nationalism: Origins, Ideologies and Modern Myths. Berg Publishers. ISBN 1859733484.
- Bhatt, Chetan (2013). "Democracy and Hindu nationalism". In John Anderson (ed.). Religion, Democracy and Democratization. Routledge. ISBN 978-1317999034.
- Jain, Girilal (1996). The Hindu phenomenon. New Delhi [u.a.: UBSPD.
- Heuzé, G. (1994). Où va l'Inde moderne?. Paris: Harmattan.
- Hansen, Thomas Blom (1999). The Saffron Wave: Democracy and Hindu Nationalism in Modern India. Princeton University Press. p. 249. ISBN 9781400823055.
- Jaffrelot, Christophe (1996). The Hindu Nationalist Movement and Indian Politics. C. Hurst & Co. Publishers. ISBN 978-1850653011.
- Nussbaum, Martha Craven (2008). The Clash Within: Democracy, Religious Violence, and India's Future. Harvard University Press. ISBN 978-0-674-03059-6.

=== Jana Sangh ===
- Baxter, Craig (1971) [first published by University of Pennsylvania Press 1969]. The Jana Sangh — A Biography of an Indian Political Party. Oxford University Press, Bombay. ISBN 0812275837.
- Graham, B. D. (1990). Hindu Nationalism and Indian Politics: The Origins and Development of the Bharatiya Jana Sangh. Cambridge University Press. ISBN 0-521-38348X.

=== BJP ===
- Malik, Yogendra (1994). Hindu nationalists in India : the rise of the Bharatiya Janata Party. Boulder: Westview Press. p. 157. ISBN 0-8133-8810-4.
- Rao, Ramesh (2001). Coalition conundrum: the BJP's trials, tribulations, and triumphs. Har Anand. ISBN 9788124108093.
- Ahuja, Gurdas M. (2004). Bharatiya Janata Party and Resurgent India. Ram Company.
- Madhu Kishwar. Modi, Muslims and Media: Voices from Narendra Modi's Gujarat (Manushi Publications, 2014). ISBN 9788192935201.
- Jaffrelot, Christophe (2023). Modi's India: Hindu Nationalism and the Rise of Ethnic Democracy. Princeton University Press. ISBN 9780691247908.

=== VHP ===
- Katju, Manjari (2013). Vishva Hindu Parishad and Indian Politics. Orient Blackswan. ISBN 978-81-250-2476-7.

=== Sangh Parivar ===
- Jaffrelot, Christophe (2005). Sangh Parivar - A Reader. Oxford University Press. ISBN 0-19-568365-X.
- Jaffrelot, Christophe (2011). Religion, Caste, and Politics in India. C Hurst & Co. ISBN 978-1849041386.

== Primary sources ==
=== RSS ===
- Golwalkar, M. S. (2000). Bunch of thoughts. Bangalore: Sahitya Sindhu Prakashana.
- Chitkara, M. G. (2004). Rashtriya Swayamsevak Sangh: National Upsurge. APH Publishing. ISBN 8176484652.

=== BJP ===
- Lal Krishna Advani. My Country My Life. (2008). ISBN 978-81-291-1363-4.
- Bharatiya Janata Party. (1993). BJP's white paper on Ayodhya & the Rama Temple movement. New Delhi: Bhaatiya Janata Party.
- Bharatiya Janata Party. (1984). Action unavoidable situation avoidable: Hindu-Sikh unity at all cost : B.J.P. on Punjab. New Delhi: Bharatiya Janata Party Publication.

=== RSS, Jana Sangh and BJP ===
- Arun Shourie, Arun Jaitley, Swapan Dasgupta, Rama J Jois: The Ayodhya Reference: Supreme Court Judgement and Commentaries. 1995. New Delhi:Voice of India. ISBN 978-8185990309
- Vishwa Hindu Parishad, History versus Casuistry: Evidence of the Ramajanmabhoomi Mandir presented by the Vishwa Hindu Parishad to the Government of India in December–January 1990–91. (1991)

== See also ==
- Bibliography of the history of the Republican Party
