= Sangh Parivar =

Collection of Hindutva organisations

The Sangh Parivar (translation: "Family of the Sangh" or the "RSS family") is an umbrella term for the collection of Hindutva organisations formed by, and affiliated to, the Rashtriya Swayamsevak Sangh (RSS), a right-wing Hindutva paramilitary organisation. These include the political party Bharatiya Janata Party (BJP), religious organisation Vishva Hindu Parishad (VHP), students union Akhil Bharatiya Vidyarthi Parishad (ABVP), among many others in India and overseas. In total, the Sangh Parivar has over 2,500 organisations.

The Sangh Parivar represents the Hindutva ideology and movement in India. Members of the Sangh Parivar or the supporters of its ideology are often referred to as "Sanghis".

== History ==
In the 1960s, the volunteers of the RSS joined the different social and political movements in India, including the Bhoodan, a land reform movement led by prominent Gandhian Vinobha Bhave and the Sarvodaya led by another Gandhian Jayaprakash Narayan. The RSS also supported the formation of a trade union, the Bharatiya Mazdoor Sangh and a student's organisation Akhil Bharatiya Vidyarthi Parishad and many other organisations like Seva Bharati, Lok Bharati and Deendayal Research Institute among others.

These organisations started and supported by the RSS volunteers came to be known collectively as the Sangh Parivar.

=== Demolition of the Babri Masjid ===
According to a report by the UPA-instituted Liberhan Commission, the Sangh Parivar organised the demolition of the Babri Masjid. The Commission said— "The blame or the credit for the entire temple construction movement at Ayodhya must necessarily be attributed to the Sangh Parivar".

It also noted that the Sangh Parivar is an "extensive and widespread organic body", which encompasses organisations, which address and bring together just about every type of social, professional and other demographic grouping of individuals.

Each time, a new demographic group has emerged, the Sangh Parivar has hived off some of its RSS inner-core leadership to harness that group and bring it within the fold, enhancing the voter base of the Parivar.

== Ideology ==
=== Economics ===
While the BJP governments have often been seen as industry friendly, the opinions and the views of the Sangh Parivar constituents like Bharatiya Mazdoor Sangh (BMS) has its own stands on "Bharatiya" approach to labour rights. The Sangh Parivar, as a whole, even the BJP in its earlier days, has advocated 'Swadeshi' (Self Reliance). Sangh Parivar leaders have been very vocal in their criticism of globalisation, especially its impact on the poor and native people. In 2000, the Swadeshi Jagran Manch (SJM) led a protest against the role of international agencies such as the World Bank and the International Monetary Fund.

=== Social reform ===
The VHP founded a number of educational institutes such as Bharat Sevashram, Hindu Milan Mandir, Ekal Vidalayas and schools in tribal locations.

=== Social and political empowerment ===
The emergence of the Sangh Parivar in Indian politics has also brought many representatives of the backward classes, who had been victims of social neglect and casteism, to comparatively prominent positions in the government and administration. At the same time, the Sangh has refused to allow said backward classes a share in the national wealth.

In many villages across India, Dharma Raksha Samitis (Duty/Religion Protection Committees) promote religious discourse and form an arena for bhajan performance. The Sangh sponsors calendars of Hindu deities and provides instruction on sanctioned methods of conducting Ganesh Chaturthi and Navaratri.

=== Politics ===
The Bharatiya Janata Party, which represents the Sangh Parivar in national politics, has formed three governments in India, most recently being in power from May 2014 under the leadership of Prime minister Narendra Modi, re-elected in May 2019 and again re-elected in 2024.

Political opponents of the BJP allege that the party's moderate face merely serves to cover the Sangh Parivar's "hidden agenda" of undiluted Hindutva, detectable by the BJP's efforts to change the content of history textbooks and syllabi as well as other aspects of the education system.

Such criticism of the BJP arises in part from the fact that BJP had only 2 seats in the parliament in 1984 and after the Babri Masjid demolition in 1992 the party gained national recognition, and rose to power in 1998.

== Reception ==
The Sangh Parivar has been described with monikers spanning the spectrum from "patriotic Hindus" to "Hindu nationalist". Some have also labeled them "Hindu chauvinist". While its constituent organisations present themselves as embedded in the traditional ethos of Hinduism, their ideological opponents have characterised them as the representatives of authoritarian, xenophobic and majoritarian religious nationalism in India, These organisations have been accused of involvement with Hindu terrorism.

=== Fascism ===
The Sangh Parivar has been described as fascist by several scholars and academics. According to historian Sumit Sarkar, Muslims are portrayed by the Sangh Parivar as an inherently unpatriotic minority with undue privilege in the propaganda disseminated by its organisations, similar to the depiction of Jews in Nazi propaganda. All dissent, and even the possibility of dissent, is framed as a form of "pseudo-secular" minority appeasement. At the same time, the Sangh Parivar presents itself as uniquely indigenous and authentically Hindu, framing secular ideals as fundamentally anti-Hindu.

What I am suggesting is that in its staging of spectacles, in its techniques of mobilisations, in the multiplicity of its fronts, in the shadowy traffic between its parliamentary and non-parliamentary organs, in the seamless interplay of form and content in its ideological interpellations, in the connection it asserts between a resurgent national tradition and the regaining of masculinist virility, in its simultaneous claims to legality and extra-legality, in its construction of a mythic history which authorises it to be above history, and in its organisation of a dharm sansad that authorises it to be above the civil parliament whenever it so chooses, the Sangh Parivar is a classically fascist force with large Indian twists of course, as every fascism must always take a specifically national form.

— Aijaz Ahmad

Whereas fascism rose to power in Italy and Germany within roughly a decade of its emergence, Hindutva, under the Sangh Parivar, followed a far longer period of gestation. Since the 1950s, its network of organisations has focused on ideological indoctrination and the circulation of ideas through popular culture, which Sarkar compares to philosopher Antonio Gramsci's theory of the "war of position", with the aim of ultimately creating a "Hindu Rashtra" (lit. 'Hindu Nation'). The growth of the Sangh Parivar has been driven by a combination of street violence, infiltration of the police, and collusion with centrist political and judicial leaders.

== List of organisations ==
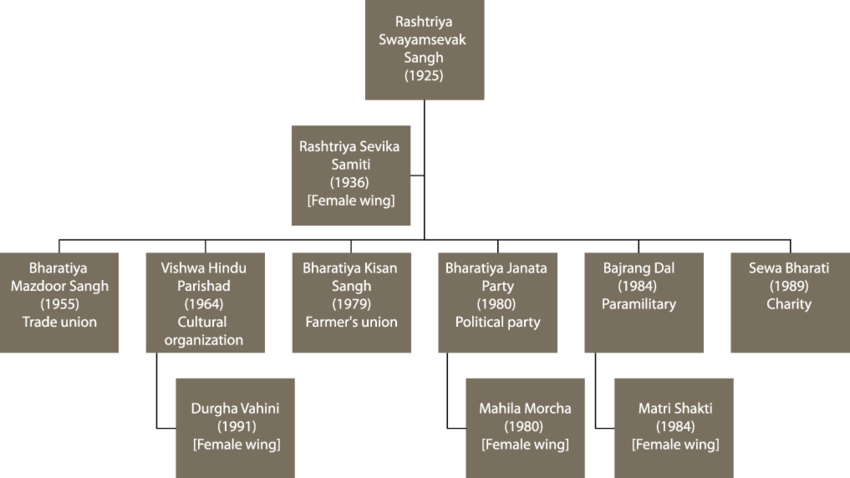
Major organisations that make up the Sangh Parivar

The Sangh Parivar encompasses over 2,500 organisations across India and around the world. The following is a non-exhaustive list of notable organisations.

=== Political ===
- Jammu Praja Parishad, literally, "People's Council", a political party active in Jammu from 1947 to 1963.
- Hindu Makkal Katchi, literally, "Hindu People's Party", a regional political party in Tamil Nadu
- Bharatiya Jana Sangh, literally, "Indian People's Association" a political party that existed from 1951 to 1977.
- Bharatiya Janata Party (BJP), Indian People's Party (202 million as of 2024)

=== Economic and occupational ===
- Bharatiya Janata Yuva Morcha (BJYM) – Indian People's Youth Front, BJP's Youth Wing
- Bharatiya Kisan Sangh – Indian Farmers' Association (8 million as of 2002)
- Bharatiya Mazdoor Sangh – Indian Labourers' Association (10 million as of 2009)
- Akhil Bharatiya Adhivakta Parishad – All India Lawyers' Council
- Akhil Bharatiya Vidyarthi Parishad – All India Students' Council (2.8 million as of 2011)
- Swadeshi Jagaran Manch – Nativist Awakening Front

=== Social services ===
- Deen Dayal Shodh Sansthan – for the development of rural areas on the basis of Integral Humanism (1.7 million as of 2002)
- Bharat Vikas Parishad – Organisation for the development and growth of India in all fields of human endeavour (1.8 million as of 2002)
- Seva Bharati – Organisation for service of the needy (founded in 1984)
- Sabarimala Ayyappa Seva Samajam
- Nele – Home for destitute children
- Vanavasi Kalyan Ashram, Tribal Welfare Monastery

=== Women ===
- Rashtra Sevika Samiti – National Volunteer Association for Women (1.8 million as of 2002)
- Durga Vahini – Women's wing of Vishwa Hindu Parishad

=== Religious and militant ===
- Vishwa Hindu Parishad – World Hindu Council (6.8 million as of 2002)
- Bajrang Dal – Brigade of Hanuman (3.8 million as of 2002)
- Bhartiya Gau Raksha Dal, Indian Cow Protection Organisation
- Hindu Jagarana Vedike – National Volunteer Association for men to protect the Hindus
- Dharm Jagaran Samiti – Organisation for conversion of non-Hindus to Hinduism and their coordinating committee "Dharam Jagaran Samanvay Samiti"
- Rashtriya Sikh Sangat – A sociocultural organisation with the aim to spread the knowledge of Gurbani to the Indian society
- Muslim Rashtriya Manch – National Front of Muslims
- Hindu Rashtra Sena – Propagating for the establishment of Hindu Rashtra

=== Regional ===
- Hindu Munnani – A religio-cultural organisation based in Tamil Nadu
- Hindu Makkal Katchi – A religio-cultural organisation based in Tamil Nadu and it works along with Hindu Munnani
- Hindu Aikya Vedi, Hindu United Front based in Kerala

=== Educational organisations ===
- Ekal Vidyalaya, Involved in free education and village development in rural areas and tribal villages of India.
- Saraswati Shishu Mandir, School
- Vidya Bharati Akhil Bharatiya Shiksha Sansthan, Educational Institutes

=== Socio-ethnic ===
- Vanavasi Kalyan Ashram, Organisation for the improvement of tribals
- Friends of Tribals Society

=== News and communication ===
- Organiser, Magazine
- Panchjanya, Magazine
- Kesari, Magazine
- Vishwa Samvad Kendra communication Wing, spread all over India for media related work, having a team of IT professionals
- Hindustan Samachar a multi-lingual news agency.

=== Think tanks ===
- Vivekananda Kendra, promotion of Swami Vivekananda's ideas with Vivekananda International Foundation in New Delhi as a "Public Policy Think Tank" with 6 Centres of study.
- Akhil Bharatiya Itihas Sankalan Yojana (ABISY), All-India History Reform Project

=== Overseas ===
- Hindu Swayamsevak Sangh, literally, Hindu Volunteer Association overseas wing of RSS
- Hindu YUVA, student group of the HSS
- Vishva Hindu Parishad America, VHP in the United States
- Hindu Students Council, VHP America-founded group
- Hindu American Foundation
- Hindu American Political Action Committee
- Coalition of Hindus of North America
- National Hindu Students' Forum, Hindu student group in UK
- India Development and Relief Fund, USA based charity

=== Others ===
- Samskrita Bharati, promotion of the Sanskrit language
- Central Hindu Military Education Society, to encourage more Hindus to join the Defence Services
- Kreeda Bharati, Sports organisation.

== See also ==
- Bibliography of the Sangh Parivar

== Bibliography ==
- Andersen, Walter K.; Damle, Shridhar D. (1987) [Originally published by Westview Press], The Brotherhood in Saffron: The Rashtriya Swayamsevak Sangh and Hindu Revivalism, Delhi: Vistaar Publications
- Carol A. Breckenridge; Sheldon Pollock; Homi K. Bhabha; Dipesh Chakrabarty (2002), Cosmopolitanism, Durham, NC: Duke University Press, ISBN 978-0-8223-2899-5
- Bhatt, Chetan (2001), Hindu Nationalism, Oxford, UK / New York, NY: Berg Publishers, ISBN 978-1-85973-348-6
- Chitkara, M. G. (2004), Rashtriya Swayamsevak Sangh: National Upsurge, APH Publishing, ISBN 9788176484657
- de la Cadena, Marisol; Starn, Orin (2007), Indigenous Experience Today, Oxford, UK: Berg Publishers, ISBN 978-1-84520-518-8
- Fuller, Christopher (2004), The Camphor Flame, Princeton, NJ: Princeton University Press, ISBN 978-0-691-12048-5
- Jaffrelot, Christophe (1996), The Hindu Nationalist Movement and Indian Politics, C. Hurst & Co. Publishers, ISBN 978-1850653011
- Jaffrelot, Christophe (2007), Hindu Nationalism, Princeton, NJ / Woodstock, UK: Princeton University Press, ISBN 978-0-691-13098-9
- Jaffrelot, Christophe (2011), Religion, Caste, and Politics in India, C Hurst & Co, ISBN 978-1849041386
- Jelen, Ted Gerard (2002), Religion and Politics in Comparative Perspective: The One, The Few, and The Many, Cambridge, UK: Cambridge University Press, ISBN 978-0-521-65031-1
- Mishra, Pankaj (2006), Temptations of the West: How to be Modern in India, Pakistan, Tibet and Beyond, New York City: Macmillan, ISBN 978-0-374-17321-0
- Saha, Santosh (2004), Religious Fundamentalism in the Contemporary World: Critical Social and Political Issues, Lexington, MA: Lexington Press, ISBN 978-0-7391-0760-7
- Sarkar, Sumit (1993). "The Fascism of the Sangh Parivar". Economic and Political Weekly. 28 (5).
- Desai, Meghnad; Pandey, Gyanendra; Kapila, Shruti; Desai, Radhika; Jagannathan, R.; Devji, Faisal; Sarwar, Beena; Kulkarni, Sudheendra; Hasan, Zoya; Ananth, V. Krishna; Whitehead, Andrew; Ninan, Sevanti; Lall, Rashmee Roshan (2016). Making Sense of Modi's India. HarperCollins. ISBN 9789351776338.
- Thakurta, Paranjoy Guha; Raghuraman, Shankar (2004), A Time of Coalitions: Divided We Stand, New Delhi, India/Thousand Oaks, CA/London, UK: SAGE, ISBN 978-0-7619-3237-6, archived from the original on 7 February 2023
