= Central Hindu Military Education Society =

Education Society

Central Hindu Military Education Society (CHME) is an Indian army school founded by B. S. Moonje. The Central Hindu Military Education Society is considered a member of the Sangh Parivar, an umbrella term for Hindutva organisations led by the Rashtriya Swayamsevak Sangh (RSS). Moonje established various types of military schools and colleges.

The society is located in Nashik, Maharashtra. At present, this institution enrolls in various types of courses.
