= Lost Islamic History: Reclaiming Muslim Civilisation from the Past =

2014 Book by Firas Alkhateeb

- First edition
- Author: Firas Alkhateeb
- Language: English
- Genre: History
- Published: August 1, 2014
- Publisher: C. Hurst & Co.
- Publication place: United Kingdom
- ISBN: 1849043973
- OCLC: 870284870

Lost Islamic History: Reclaiming Muslim Civilisation from the Past is a book on Islamic history, written by American researcher and historian Firas Alkhateeb. It was first published in 2014 via Hurst Publishers in the United Kingdom. It has since been translated into Turkish, Bengali, Indonesian and Urdu.

Per the author, the book is intended to serve as a primer for readers unfamiliar with the subject of Islamic history.

== Synopsis ==
The book covers a brief overview of the history of Muslim Civilization, from the early days of Islamic Civilization to modern day.

== Release ==
Lost Islamic History: Reclaiming Muslim Civilisation from the Past was first published in the United Kingdom on 1 August 2014 through Hurst Publishers. A revised and expanded second edition was released on 15 November 2017, also via Hurst Publishers. This newer edition contained an additional chapter entitled "The Islamic Sciences", which covers aspects of Islamic sciences not covered in the 2014 release.

== Reception ==
The Prime Minister of Pakistan, Imran Khan, recommended the book via Twitter as a read for young people during the COVID-19 lockdowns, as he felt that it was "An excellent brief history of the driving force that made Islamic civilisation the greatest of its time and then the factors behind its decline." After this tweet Alkhateeb discovered that a fake version of his book containing inaccuracies and other misinformation was being digitally distributed on the Internet, prompting him to warn readers that the false version was "entirely inaccurate & Islamophobic".
