= 1927 Nagpur riots =

Ethnic violence in British India

- Date: 4 September 1927
- Location: Nagpur, Central Provinces and Berar, British Raj

Casualties
- Deaths: 27
- Injuries: 200+

The Nagpur riots of 1927 were part of series of riots taking place across various cities in British India during the 1920s. Nagpur was then the capital of Central Provinces and Berar (CP&B) state of British India which covered most of the central India. The riots occurred on 4 September 1927. On that day, there was a procession for Mahalakshmi, which was blocked by Muslims when it came to the Muslim neighbourhood. In the afternoon, there was rioting near the Hindu houses of the neighbourhood, which continued for three days.

== Background ==
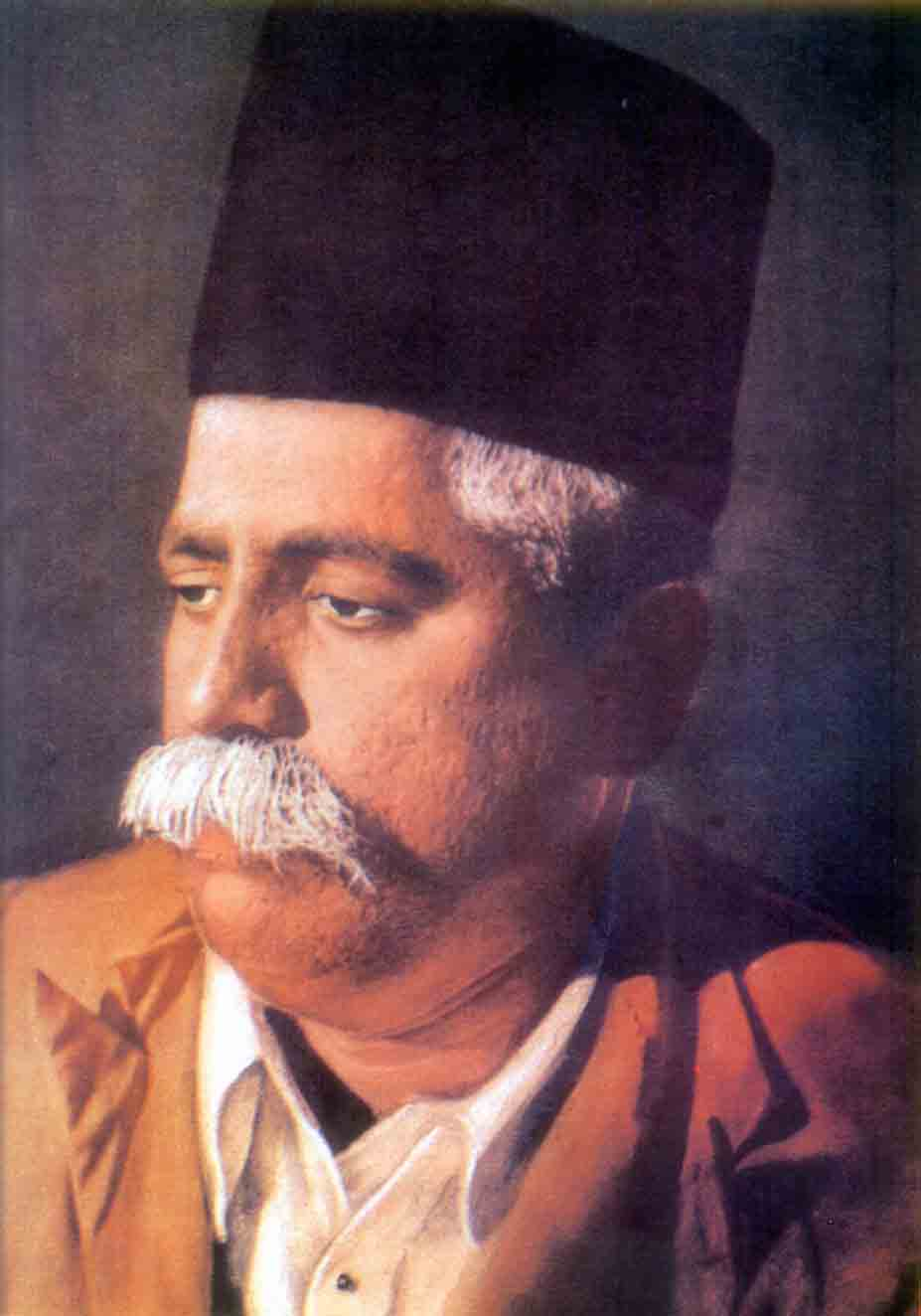
K. B. Hedgewar founded Rashtriya Swayamsevak Sangh after the 1923 riots.

The mutual trust between Hindu and Muslim communities had reached a low in the 1920s, and riots were seen frequently across many cities of India. In 1923, India witnessed eleven riots, in 1924 there were eighteen riots, in 1925 there were sixteen riots, and in 1926 there were thirty five riots. In the twelve months from May 1926 to April 1926, 40 more riots occurred across various cities. They mostly occurred in Bengal, Punjab, North-West Frontier Province and United Provinces.

The Lahore riots of August 1927 were the most deadly recorded riots in this series.

The earlier riot of 1923 was caused when the members of Hindu Mahasabha took out a procession and passed in front of a mosque, playing loud music. The Muslim community objected, starting a skirmish between the two parties. These riots had a profound impact on K. B. Hedgewar, prompting him to form, in 1925, the Rashtriya Swayamsevak Sangh (RSS), a Hindu nationalist organization and one of the largest Hindu organizations in the world. Christophe Jaffrelot in his book The Hindu Nationalist Movement and Indian Politics records a testimony saying that Hedgewar led the Ganesha procession in 1927, beating the drums in defiance of the usual practice not to pass in front of the mosque with music. All these events acted as a catalyst building up the tensions between two communities.

== Riots ==
Monday, September 4, was the day of Laxmi Puja. Like every year, Hindus took out a procession of Lakshmi in front of the mosque in the palace area. But this year, Muslims stopped the procession because they were playing loud music this time. There was an atmosphere of tension on both sides.

The Washington Post reported 22 had been killed and more than 100 injured in riots that continued for two days.

Later, the government ordered troops into the city to restore peace. During the riots, the RSS had grouped its cadres in 16 shakhas, spread out across the city to protect the Hindu communities.

== Aftermath ==
Many homes and religious places had been vandalized and Hindus had also been killed in large numbers including 13 RSS members who were lynched by a furious Muslim mob. RSS had showcased its role in defending Hindus during the riots. The popularity of the organization grew as the news of the incident spread across the country, and it saw a spurt in its membership. By 1929, the organization formed an elaborate hierarchical structure. Between 1931–1939, the number of its branches grew from 60 to 500. The membership count had reached 60,000 by this time.
