= Bharat Vikas Parishad =

Indian right-wing organisation

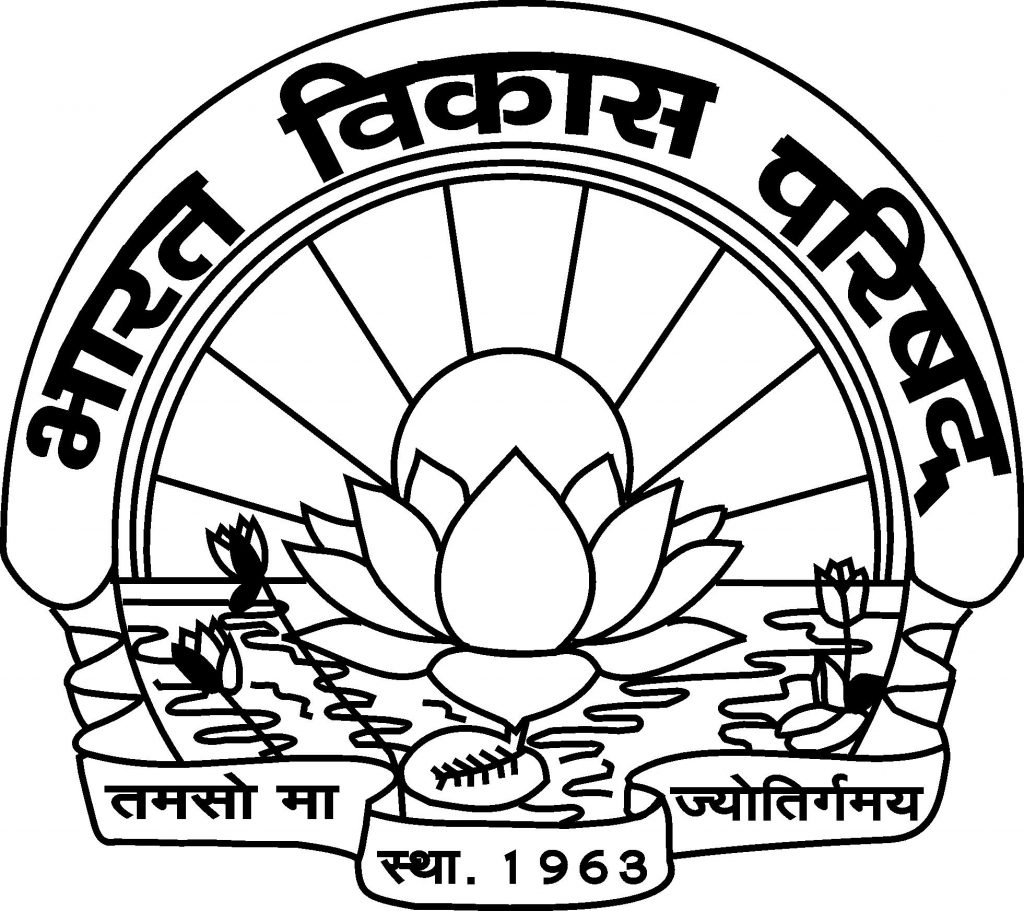
- Abbreviation: BVP
- Formation: 12 January 1963 (63 years ago)
- Type: Right Wing
- Legal status: Active
- Headquarters: Pitampura, Delhi, India
- Region served: India
- Members: 68,096 (2018–2019)
- National Organising Secretary: Suresh Jain
- National President: Gajendra Singh Sandhu
- National General Secretary: Shyam Sharma
- Parent organisation: Rashtriya Swayamsevak Sangh
- Affiliations: Sangh Parivar
- Website: bvpindia.com

Bharat Vikas Parishad (BVP) (translation: Indian Development Council) is a member of Sangh Parivar.

== History ==
The BVP, founded in 1963 on the birth anniversary of Swami Vivekananda is a right-wing voluntary organisation. It was initially formed with name - Citizens Council to mobilize people against Chinese attacks on Indian territory but was later renamed and registered as a society on 10 July 1963. Its primary purpose is to organize Indian citizens for philanthropic work. BVP is a member of Sangh Parivar.

== Activities ==
Bharat Vikas Parishad's manifesto includes social organizing for social reforms.

=== Donations to fight against Novel Corona Virus ===
BVP's regional branches were seen distributing sanitizers and raising awareness about precautions to prevent COVID-19 from spreading. Distribution of ration among people was also done. In September 2020, BVP donated 2.11 crore to the PM Cares fund.

=== Scholarship for students ===
Scholarship for students are also distributed by BVP's regional branches.

=== Skill development for blinds ===
Under a social outreach program BVP hosts skill development program for the blind.

== Awards ==
Awarded to Bharat Vikas Parishad
Year	Award	Place	Awarded by
1995	National Award	Delhi	President of India
2004	National Award	Ludhiana	President of India
2007	FICCI Awards	Ludhiana	Prime Minister of India
2008	Nirmal Gram Puraskar	Delhi	President of India
