= Kreeda Bharati =

Indian sports organisation

Kreeda Bharati (lit. 'Sports India or Indian Sports'; abbr.:KB) is an Indian sports organisation established in 1992 in Pune. It was founded by the Rashtriya Swayamsevak Sangh (RSS), a right-wing Hindutva paramilitary organisation. Kreeda Bharati promotes physical and mental sports among the youth.

== History ==
The organisation was formed by the RSS and operates under its authority. It is a part of the Sangh Parivar, a collection of Hindutva organisations led by the RSS.

== Objective ==
The main objective of Kreeda Bharati is to promote indigenous sports, traditional rural games, as well as "lost and ancient games", alongside other established sports in India.
