= Muslim Rashtriya Manch =

Rashtriya Swayamsevak Sangh subsidiary

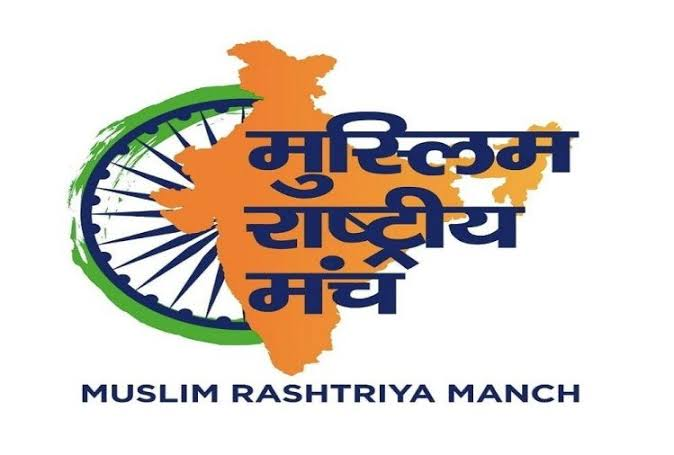
- Formation: 24 December 2002 (23 years ago)
- Headquarters: DDA Flats, 14-B MIG, Motia Khan, Sadar Bazaar, New Delhi, Delhi 110055
- Region served: India
- Key people: Indresh Kumar
- Parent organisation: Rashtriya Swayamsevak Sangh
- Affiliations: Bharatiya Janata Party; Sangh Parivar
- Volunteers: ▲10,000+
- Website: muslimrashtriyamanch.com

The Muslim Rashtriya Manch (MRM; translation: Muslim National Forum) is a subsidiary of the Rashtriya Swayamsevak Sangh (RSS), a right-wing Hindutva paramilitary organisation. It claims to be an independent Muslim body aligned with nationalist ideals.

== History ==
MRM was formally established on 24 December 2002, in a meeting held at the residence of journalist Muzaffer Hussain and his wife Nafisa Husain. Its formation came shortly after the 2002 Gujarat riots. Key figures in attendance included K. S. Sudarshan, the then-Supreme Commander of the RSS, along with prominent RSS leaders such as M. G. Vaidya, Indresh Kumar, and Madan Das. Muslim religious leaders and intellectuals also participated in the meeting. Indresh Kumar, protege of Sudarshan, assumed a leading role in shaping the organisation's direction.

== Ideology and activism ==
The MRM was founded with the stated aim of bringing Muslim communities close to Hindus in India. It states that Muslim suspicions of the RSS and its affiliates are misplaced, and that the Indian National Congress is responsible for leadership within the Muslim community. The MRM has also expressed support for many of the causes espoused by the RSS, including the banning of cow-slaughter. Its national convener, Mohammed Afzal, stated that the organisation faced significant resistance in the days following the Godhra train burning and the 2002 Gujarat riots.

In November 2009 the Jamiat Ulema-e-Hind, one of the largest Islamic organisations in India, passed a resolution describing Vande Mataram as an un-Islamic song. The MRM expressed opposition to the resolution. Afzal stated "Our Muslim brothers should not follow the fatwa as Vande Mataram is the national song of the country and every Indian citizen should respect and recite it." The MRM stated further that Muslims who refused to sing it were opponents of both Islam and India. In August 2008, MRM organised a Paigham-e-Aman (message of peace) yatra from the Red Fort in Delhi to Kashmir in support of land allocation for the Amarnath pilgrimage. Led by the Jharkhand Shahee-Imam Moulana Hizb Rehman Merthi, the 50 activists of the yatra were initially stopped at the border of Jammu & Kashmir. They were later allowed to go to Jammu where they held meetings with the Shri Amarnath Sangharsh Samiti. In November 2009, the MRM organised a tiranga yatra (march in honour of the national flag) leading to the Gateway of India in Mumbai, protesting against terrorism. One thousand volunteers took a pledge against terror and vowed to campaign against it in their home districts. In September 2012, the MRM organised a signature campaign to revoke Article 370 of the Indian Constitution, which grants limited autonomy to the state of Jammu and Kashmir, and claimed to have collected 700,000 signatures.

In the 2014 general election, the MRM campaigned for Bharatiya Janata Party candidate Narendra Modi. Afzal stated that the MRM would attempt to reach out to 50 million Muslims before the election. When questioned about Modi's involvement in the Gujarat riots, Afzal stated:

"Had Mr. Modi been involved in the riots, his police would not have fired 1,200 rounds and killed over 200 rioters. Every court has acquitted him. And there is not a single incident of communal violence in Gujarat in the past 12 years.”

The Manch expressed its views that 'Yoga' does not have anything to do with religion, further stating that "Namaaz is one sort of Yoga asana". The move was supported by the Union Ministry of Ayurveda, Yoga and Naturopathy, Unani, Siddha and Homoeopathy (AYUSH) but Hindu groups expressed reservations.

In West Bengal, where the organisation operates regional divisions across South Bengal (Dakshin Banga), North Bengal (Uttar Banga), and Central Bengal (Madhya Banga) from its state office in Rajarhat, Kolkata, the state unit compiled a preliminary list of children of triple talaq victims across several districts in May 2017 with a proposal to provide them free education. In April 2025, following violent protests against the Waqf (Amendment) Act in Murshidabad and South 24 Parganas, the MRM condemned the violence, criticized Chief Minister Mamata Banerjee's administration over the unrest, and appealed to Muslims to maintain peace.

== See also ==
- Sangh Parivar
- Bharatiya Janata Party
- Rashtriya Swayamsevak Sangh (RSS)
- Rashtriya Sikh Sangat
