= C. Hurst & Co. =

Independent non-fiction publisher

- Status: Active
- Founded: 1969
- Founder: Christopher Hurst
- Country of origin: United Kingdom
- Headquarters location: London, WC1
- Distribution: Macmillan Distribution (UK); Oxford University Press (US)
- Key people: Michael Dwyer, Kathleen May, Daisy Leitch
- Publication types: Books, ebooks and audiobooks
- Nonfiction topics: International Affairs; Islamic World; Politics and Social Science
- Official website: hurstpublishers.com

Hurst Publishers (C. Hurst & Co Publishers Ltd) is an independent non-fiction publisher based in Somerset House, Strand, London. Hurst specializes in serious non-fiction, including history, biography, international affairs, espionage, reportage, travel writing and religion. Christopher Hurst founded the company in 1969. Michael Dwyer, who joined Hurst in 1986, has been running Hurst since the death of Christopher Hurst in April 2007.

Hurst authors include Olivier Roy, Eleanor Medhurst, Shashi Tharoor, David Kilcullen, Sara Jaffe, Faisal Devji, Jean-Pierre Filiu, Gaiutra Bahadur, Christophe Jaffrelot, Henrik Meinander, Jessica Mitford, Anwar Ibrahim, Matthew Ford, Max Siollun and Dan Kaszeta among others. Hurst publishes approximately 75 new books a year.

== History ==
Christopher Hurst (1929–2007) founded the publishing house and pursued his, sometimes eclectic, interests, including Scandinavian culture and Balkan history. In the mid-1980s, he became an activist for small, independent publishers, making his voice heard in the Publishers' Association.

== Publishing list ==
=== Authors ===
- Jean-Pierre Filiu
- James Harpur
- Christophe Jaffrelot
- Dan Kaszeta
- Paul Lendvai
- David Omand
- Gerard Prunier
- Carne Ross
- Abdul Salam Zaeef
