= Christophe Jaffrelot =

French political scientist (born 1964)

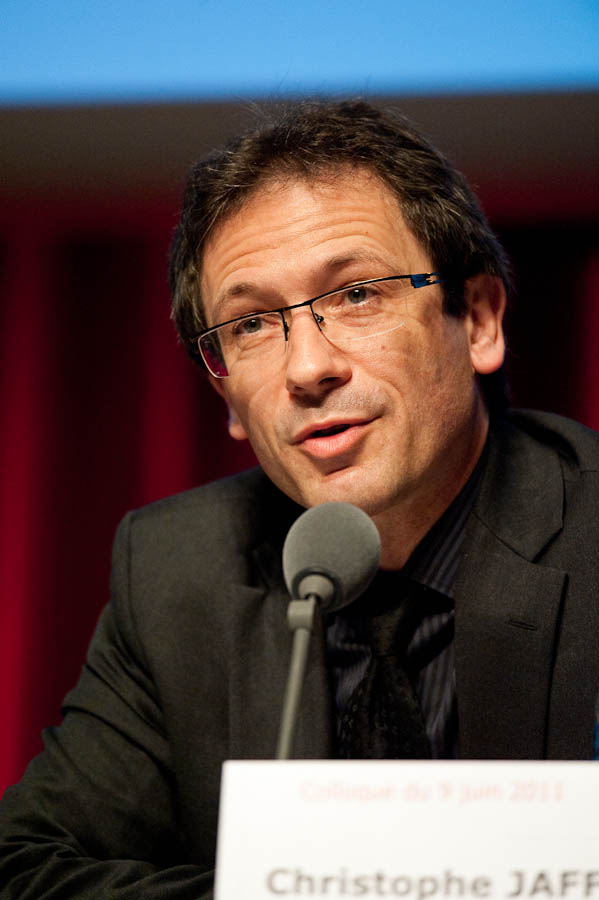
- Jaffrelot in 2011
- Born: February 12, 1964 (age 62); Poissy, France
- Education: Sciences Po; University of Paris 1 Pantheon-Sorbonne; Institut national des langues et civilisations orientales
- Occupations: Political commentator, writer
- Known for: Studies of South Asian Politics

Christophe Jaffrelot (born 12 February 1964) is a French political scientist specialising in South Asia, particularly India and Pakistan. He is a professor of South Asian politics and history the Centre d'études et de recherches internationales (CERI) at Sciences Po (Paris), a professor of Indian Politics and Sociology at the India Institute of King's College London, and a Research Director at the Centre national de la recherche scientifique (CNRS).

Critics have questioned aspects of Jaffrelot's interpretation of Hindu nationalism and his analysis of BJP rule and the Modi government's political trajectory.

== Education ==
Christophe Jaffrelot is a graduate of the institut d’études politiques (Sciences Po) in Paris, the université de Paris-I Panthéon-Sorbonne, and of the Institut national des langues et civilisations orientales (INALCO). He has a doctorate of political science from Sciences Po in 1991 and has received a post-doctoral Habilitation degree.

== Career and work ==
Jaffrelot works at the Centre for Studies in International Relations (CERI)-Sciences Po and has served as its Director from 2000 to 2008. He is currently a senior research fellow at CNRS and a professor at Sciences Po. He is also a visiting professor at the India Institute, King's College London, and has taught at Columbia University, Yale University, Johns Hopkins University, the Université de Montréal, and as a Global Scholar at Princeton University. Since 2008, he has been a non-resident fellow at the Carnegie Endowment for International Peace.

Jaffrelot was awarded the CNRS Bronze Medal in 1993, has served as editor or editor-in-chief of several scholarly journals on politics and sociology, and is a Permanent Consultant at the Direction de la Prospective of the French Ministry of Foreign Affairs. He chairs the scientific council of the six research centers of the French Ministry of Foreign Affairs and CNRS in Asia since 2007. Jaffrelot is the president of the Political Science section of the French National Committee for Scientific Research (CoNRS) since 2012.

Jaffrelot's research is centered on South Asia, particularly India and Pakistan. His publications on India cover aspects of Indian nationalism and democracy, Hindu nationalism, caste mobilisation in politics and ethnic conflicts. Similarly, on Pakistan, his scholarship has focused on Pakistani nationalism, Islamic fundamentalism, Taliban and Kashmir militancy, politics, coups and its history as a rentier state in the context of global geopolitics. His interest in India was kindled when he was still in school, through a philosophy teacher well-versed in Indian philosophy. He visited India when he was 20 and found Indian society interesting in many different ways.

He is the senior editor of the Sciences Po book series, Comparative Politics and International Relations published by C. Hurst & Co. He has been the editor-in-chief of Critique Internationale and serves on the editorial boards of Nations and Nationalism and International Political Sociology. He is also on the editorial board of The Online Encyclopaedia of Mass Violence.

He often writes columns for the Indian Express and The Caravan, and received the Ramnath Goenka Award for Excellence in Journalism. He was awarded the Brienne Prize for geopolitics by the Defense Ministry of France for his book Le Syndrome Pakistanais.

In 2026, Jaffrelot helped to found the South Asian Studies Observatory of Academic Freedom (SASOAF), a project of the British Association for South Asian Studies.

== Reception ==
Hindu Nationalist Movement and Indian Politics, based on his doctorate research, is considered Jaffrelot's magnum opus. Walter Andersen, a scholar who has studied the Rashtriya Swayamsevak Sangh (RSS), a right-wing Hindutva paramilitary organisation, said that "for the expert on South Asia, this book is an absolute must." Craig Baxter, another author, said that it was required for anyone with an interest in South Asia. Stacey Burlet states that the book combines "an abundance of information" with "lucid analysis." Richard White states that the book is "formidably well researched and explores all the main arguments and themes relating to the subject." White adds that Jaffrelot – based on the research and understanding of Indian society and politics – predicted that the Hindu nationalist ideology-based Bharatiya Janata Party will not be able to win general elections and form the central government, a prediction that proved to be incorrect to Jaffrelot's misfortune.

According to Bhagwan Josh, Jaffrelot's The Hindu Nationalist Movement and Indian Politics is based on extensive fieldwork and effort making it an "immensely rewarding read", but makes a number of "untenable assumptions" regarding the nature of Indian culture, "Hindu consciousness/identity", and the nature of early Hindu nationalism within the Indian National Congress. According to T. V. Sathyamurthy, Jaffrelot's scholarship on Hindu nationalism is an important contribution with empirical depth and field research in Madhya Pradesh and the interviews of RSS members. He states that Jaffrelot's insights include Hindutva as a form of nationalism that is based on a "cultural criteria rather than on racial theory" and a view of "politics based on ethnic nationalism". Along with this and numerous other remarkable insights, Jaffrelot advocates a rubric of "Stigmatising and Emulating Threatening Others" strategy, which Satyamurthy finds to be flawed, "not only childish" but also "psychologically reductionist and politically nonsensical" in the context of India.

According to Asad Abbasi of London School of Economics, Jaffrelot's book The Pakistan Paradox is a necessary text for every student interested in Pakistan. However, states Abbasi, the book is "littered with spelling mistakes, repetition, tense conflicts and other silly errors — on page 130, Mumtaz Bhutto is cousin of ZA Bhutto, but by page 134 Mumtaz becomes Benazir’s cousin". According to Tania Patel, Jaffrelot provides "compelling insights for understanding the nuances of the contestations and continuities in Pakistan’s state and society" and elaborates "the country’s chronic instability in three contradictions whose roots lie in tensions apparent since the 1940s".

Jaffrelot's 2021 book Modi's India: Hindu Nationalism and the Rise of Ethnic Democracy received both praise for its documentation and methodological criticism. Reviewers such as Melwyn S. Pinto and Gurharpal Singh commended the book as a "statistically sound" and "well-researched" narrative of the BJP government's record supported by extensive official and NGO data. At the same time, Singh faulted Jaffrelot's theoretical approach as "descriptive theory borrowing" that lacked a predictive model or deep sociological analysis of Indian society, while Pinto noted that the volume relied heavily on secondary sources and verbatim speeches rather than first-hand ground research. Similarly, political scientist C. Christine Fair noted that despite "significant organizational and logical shortcomings", the book's detailed examination of Hindu nationalism and Indian secular democracy "will reward the reader with the stamina to grapple with it".

== Publications ==
On India

- Les Nationalistes hindous (in French), Presses de Sciences Po, Paris, 1993
- The Hindu Nationalist Movement and Indian politics, London: C. Hurst & Co. and Penguin India, 1996, ISBN 978-1850653011; also published as Hindu Nationalism in India by Columbia University Press, 1998.
- L'Inde contemporaine de 1950 à nos jours (in French), direction, Fayard, Paris, 1996, rééd. 1997, 2006
- La Démocratie en Inde. Religion, caste et politique (in French), Fayard, Paris, 1998
- Dr Ambedkar - Leader intouchable et père de la Constitution indienne (in French), Sciences Po 2000, ISBN 2-7246-0800-3
- The BJP and the Compulsions of Politics in India, co-edited with Thomas Blom Hansen, Oxford University Press India, 2000, ISBN 0195652495.
- Tribus et basses castes. Résistance et autonomie dans la société indienne (in French), co-direction avec Marine Carrin, École des hautes études en sciences sociales, Paris, 2003
- India's Silent Revolution. The Rise of the Lower Castes in North India, Columbia University Press, C. Hurst & Co. and New Delhi: Permanent Black, 2003.
- Ambedkar and Untouchability. Analysing and Fighting Caste, New Delhi: Permanent Black, C. Hurst & Co. and Columbia University Press, 2004
- Sangh Parivar: A Reader (edited), Oxford University Press, 2005, ISBN 0-19-568365-X.
- Inde : la démocratie par la caste. Histoire d'une mutation socio-politique (1885–2005) (in French), Fayard, Paris, 2005, ISBN 2-213-62426-7
- Hindu Nationalism: A Reader (edited), Princeton University Press, 2007, ISBN 0-691-13097-3.
- Patterns of Middle Class Consumption in India and China, co-edited with Peter van der Veer, SAGE Publications, 2008, ISBN 0761936238.
- India since 1950: Society, Politics, Economy and Culture (edited), New Delhi: Yatra Books, 2011.
- Muslims in Indian Cities: Trajectories of Marginalisation, co-edited with Laurent Gayer, C. Hurst & Co., 2012, ISBN 1849041768.
- Rise of the Plebeians? The Changing Face of the Indian Legislative Assemblies, co-edited with Sanjay Kumar, Routledge, 2009, ISBN 0415460921.
- Religion, Caste, and Politics in India, C. Hurst & Co., 2011, ISBN 978-1849041386.
- Saffron Modernity in India: Narendra Modi and his Experiment with Gujarat, C. Hurst & Co., 2015, ISBN 1849044295.
- Majoritarian State: How Hindu Nationalism is Changing India, co-edited with Angana P. Chatterji and Thomas Blom Hansen, C. Hurst & Co., 2019, ISBN 978-178738-147-6
- Business and Politics in India, eds. Atul Kohli, Kanta Murali and Christophe Jaffrelot (Oxford University Press, 2019).
- India's First Dictatorship: The Emergency, 1975-1977, co-authored with Pratinav Anil (C. Hurst & Co., December 2020).
- Modi's India: Hindu Nationalism and the Rise of Ethnic Democracy, Christophe Jaffrelot (Princeton University Press, August 2021).

On Pakistan

- Le Pakistan (in French), direction, Fayard, Paris, 2000
- Le Pakistan, carrefour de tensions régionales (in French), direction, Complexe, Bruxelles, 1999, rééd. 2002
- Pakistan. Nationalism without a Nation?, direction, New Delhi: Manohar, London: Centre de sciences humaines and New York: Zed Books, 2002, rééd. 2004, ISBN 1842771175.
- A History of Pakistan and Its Origins, direction, London: Anthem Press, 2004, ISBN 1843311496.
- Le Syndrome Pakistanais (in French), 2013, ISBN 9782213661704
- The Pakistan Paradox: Instability and Resilience, C. Hurst & Co., 2015, ISBN 1849043299.
- Pakistan at the Crossroads: Domestic Dynamics and External Pressures (edited), Columbia University Press, 2016.

On South Asia

- Armed Militias of South Asia: Fundamentalists, Maoists and Separatists, co-edited with Laurent Gayer, C. Hurst & Co., 2009, ISBN 185065977X.

Other topics

- Démocraties d'ailleurs. Démocraties et démocratisations hors d'Occident, direction, Karthala, Paris, 2000
- Revisiting Nationalism. Theories and Processes, co-edited with Alain Dieckhoff, C. Hurst & Co., 2005
- Emerging States: The Wellspring of a New World Order (edited), C. Hurst & Co., 2009, ISBN 1850659710.
