= Walter K. Andersen =

American academic

Walter K. Andersen is an American academic known for his studies of the Rashtriya Swayamsevak Sangh (RSS), an Indian Hindutva paramilitary organization. He currently serves as Senior Adjunct Professor of South Asia Studies at Johns Hopkins University Paul H. Nitze School of Advanced International Studies and is a part of the faculty of Tongji University, Shanghai (China). Previously, he taught comparative politics at the College of Wooster before joining the United States State Department as a political analyst for South Asia specializing in India and Indian Ocean affairs. Additionally, he was an adjunct professor at The American University in Washington, D.C.

== Education ==
Andersen earned his Ph.D. in political science from the University of Chicago. As a part of his field work, he lived in India for four years from late 1960s through early 1970s. There he came in contact with the Akhil Bharatiya Vidyarthi Parishad (ABVP; the student wing of the RSS). That association led to an introduction to M. S. Golwalker, the-then head of the RSS. Anderson's scholarship has focused on the RSS and Indian politics. He considers Lloyd and Susanne Rudolph as his mentors.

== Scholarship of the Rashtriya Swayamsevak Sangh ==
Andersen, with Sridhar D. Damle, co-authored the 1987 book The Brotherhood in Saffron: The Rashtriya Swayamsevak Sangh and Hindu Revivalism. The book has been called an authoritative, detailed examination of the Rashtriya Swayamsevak Sangh (RSS), including its early growth in the pre-independence period, its organization, the function of its various officers and the evolution of its ideology. "The founders of the RSS concluded that the Hindu social body was weak and disorganized because dharma was neither clearly understood nor correctly observed." It was the task of the Sangh's members to create a stable Hindu society and culture.

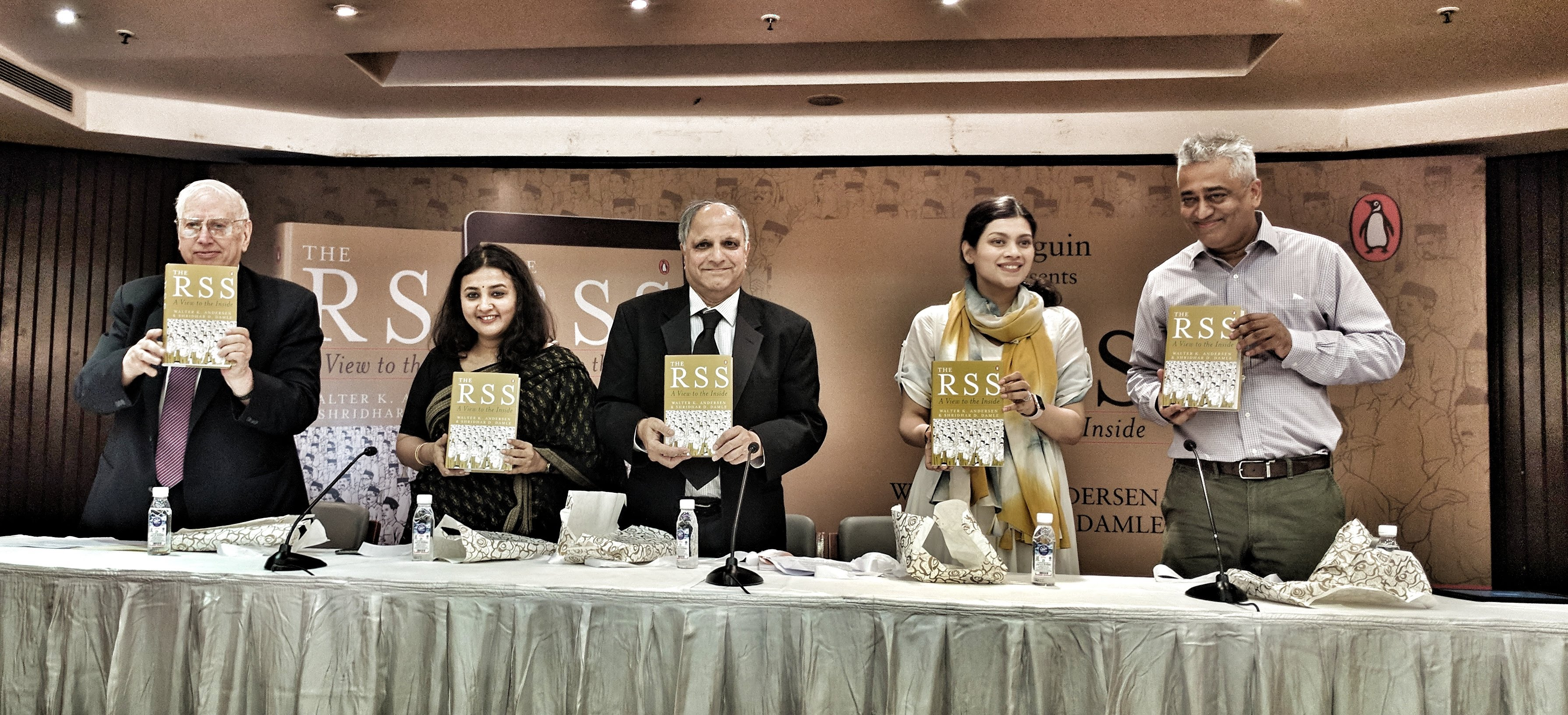
Walter K Anderson (far left) during the launch of his book "The RSS" co-authored with Sridhar D. Damle and published by Penguin. Also in picture Rajdeep Sardesai and Nistula Hebbar.

The authors avoid categorizing the RSS as having an ideologically loaded framework and treat it with "understanding and objectivity." Roughly half the book focuses on the political involvement of the Sangh, with the Bharatiya Jana Sangh, the Janata Party and the Bharatiya Janata Party (BJP), and includes information about how the Sangh exerts influence on the political partners.

In 2018, Andersen and Damle co-authored The RSS: A View to the Inside. After the book's publication, the Political Science scholar Ashutosh Varshney remarked that "Andersen is the only scholar who has observed or studied the RSS for nearly five decades". According to Andrew Nathan, Andersen and Damle "take an exceptionally well-informed look at the RSS, including its relations with affiliate organizations", and discuss how the "core concept of Hindutva, or “Hinduness,” is now glossed as loyalty to the Indian civilization rather than adherence to specific religious practices, a revision made easier by the unsystematic character of Hindu beliefs" while still "espousing aggressive anti-Muslim and socially conservative positions". Andersen calls the book a sequel to The Brotherhood in Saffron book published in 1987, and one that presents the significant changes in India and the RSS since 1987. According to Andersen, the RSS has formed and grown over a hundred affiliated organizations to help penetrate nearly every part of India. These affiliates now play an active role in lobbying the policy processes.

Walter Andersen has also written a four-part series of articles on the Rastriya Swayamsevak Sangh in the Economic and Political Weekly in 1972.
