= Rousing Call to Hindu Nation =

Compilation of Swami Vivekananda's work

- Rousing Call to Hindu Nation 2009 edition front cover
- Author: Swami Vivekananda; Editor: Eknath Ranade
- Language: English
- Published: 1963
- Publication place: India
- Pages: 169
- ISBN: 8189248103

Rousing Call to Hindu Nation or Swami Vivekananda's Rousing Call to Hindu Nation (1963) is a compilation of Indian Hindu monk Swami Vivekananda's writings and speeches edited by Eknath Ranade the leader of Rashtriya Swayamsevak Sangh. The book was published in 1963, in the birth centenary of Vivekananda. Ranade dedicated the book as a "personal homage to the great patriot-saint" Swami Vivekananda.

== Background ==
Swami Vivekananda was born in Calcutta (now Kolkata) on 12 January 1863. The year 1963 was celebrated as his birth centenary year and numerous initiatives were taken all over India. In 1963, M. S. Golwalkar, the second "Sarsanghchalak" (Supreme chief) of the Rashtriya Swayamsevak Sangh requested Ranade to take up the responsibility to establish the Vivekananda Rock Memorial. Ranade who had widely read the works of Vivekananda was deeply influenced by his teachings. He then took the initiative first to install a tablet on the Vivekananda Rock, Kanyakumari, and then published the book, a selection of Vivekananda's writings, titled Swami Vivekananda's Rousing Call to Hindu Nation, in Calcutta as a personal tribute.

== Content ==
While Vivekananda, during his lifetime, had talked on a wide spectrum of themes such as philosophy, religion, sociology, music and architecture, Eknath Ranade in his compilation limited the coverage to Vivekananda's writings related to India's ancient heritage, the reasons that led to its decline to the present state and the ways and means to reattain the past glory. Highlighted in the book are Vivekananda's call to rouse the conscience of the Hindus to establish the glory of Hindustan: "Arise! Awake! And stop not till the goal is reached".

Ranade divided the book in four parts — a) The message b) selections from Addresses, discourses and writings, c) some observations and admonitions and d) Man-making or the moulding of workers. Each part is divided into multiple chapters, each of which contains selections of Swami Vivekananda's writing and speeches related to India and Hinduism.

== Publication ==
Ranade's book was published in 1963, which was the birth centenary year of Vivekananda. The book was published by Swastik Prakashan, Calcutta. Ranade called the book a "personal homage to the great patriot-saint" Swami Vivekananda.

== Reception ==
The book received mainly positive reception. According to Antony Copley, the writer of "Hinduism in public and private: reform, Hindutva, gender, and sampraday", the book "exemplified" Vivekananda's theory of the difference between Hindutva and Hinduism. Swami Vivekananda's originally published book in Bengali was translated into English in 1993 and was named My India, Eternal India. This book followed the same format as Ranade's book and contained compilation of Vivekananda's sayings on different topics.
