= Vivekananda Kendra Vidyalaya =

Academic wing of Hindu spiritual organization

Vivekananda Kendra Vidyalaya or VKV is the academic wing of Vivekananda Kendra (an organization based on Swami Vivekananda's preachings of life–reforming principles), operating a chain of schools under the project Vivekananda Kendra Siksha Prasar Vibhag (VKSPV). Vidyalaya is a sanskrit word meaning school. The corporate headquarters of the organization is at Kanyakumari, Tamil Nadu in southern India. The ideology of Gyan – Yagna, meaning Knowledge Worship, started by Ekanathji Ranade led to the inception of VKV. The school teachings are inspired by the Vivekananda's philosophy of Man – Making & Nation Building.

== Schools ==
There are a total of 64 VKVs providing education to approximately 20,000 students in the Indian states of Arunachal Pradesh, Assam, Karnataka, Nagaland and Tamil Nadu, besides the Andaman Islands. The schools are guided by their corporate values inspired by the general philosophies of Swami Vivekananda, such as Education is the manifestation of perfection already in man, If the poor boy can't come to education, education must go to him etc. The first VKV was started at Sher in Arunachal Pradesh. Most of these schools are fully residential and focus on the holistic growth of their students.

No.	State	Total number of VKVs
1	Arunachal Pradesh	44
2	Assam	24
3	Andamans	9
4	Nagaland	1
5	Karnataka	1 (Kallubalu)
6	Tamil Nadu	2 (Kanyakumari)

=== In Arunachal Pradesh ===
The schools in Arunachal Pradesh are run and managed under Vivekananda Kendra Arunachal Pradesh Trust (VKAPT) of Vivekananda Kendra headquartered at Dibrugarh in Assam.

Sl. No.	School	District	Year of Inception	Level	Website
1	VKV Balijan	Papum Pare	1977	Secondary	https://balijan.vkv.in
2	VKV Jairampur	Changlang	1977	Senior Secondary	https://jairampur.vkv.in
3	VKV Kharsang	Changlang	1977	Secondary	https://kharsang.vkv.in
4	VKV Oyan	East Siang	1977	Secondary	https://oyan.vkv.in
5	VKV Roing	Lower Dibang Valley	1977	Senior Secondary	https://roing.vkv.in
6	VKV Seijosa	East Kameng	1977	Secondary	https://seijosa.vkv.in
7	VKV Sher	Papum Pare	1977	Secondary	https://sher.vkv.in
8	VKV Tafrogam	Lohit	1980	Secondary	https://tafrogam.vkv.in
9	VKV Amiliang	Lohit	1981	Secondary	https://amliang.vkv.in
10	VKV Niausa	Tirap	1981	Secondary	http://niausa.vkv.in
11	VKV Shergaon	West Kameng	1981	Senior Secondary	https://shergaon.vkv.in
12	VKV Sunpura	Lohit	1981	Secondary	https://sunpura.vkv.in
13	VKV Jirdin	West Siang	1982	Secondary	https://jirdin.vkv.in
14	VKV Kuporijo	Upper Subansiri	1987	Secondary	https://kuporijo.vkv.in
15	VKV Nivedita Vihar	East Kameng	1994	Secondary	https://niveditavihar.vkv.in
16	VKV Itanagar	Papum Pare	1995	Senior Secondary	https://itanagar.vkv.in
17	VKV Yazali	Lower Subansiri	1997	Senior Secondary	https://yazali.vkv.in
18	VKV Liromoba	West Siang	1998	Primary	http://liromoba.vkv.in
19	VKV Ziro	Lower Subansiri	2000	Secondary	https://ziro.vkv.in
20	VKV Nirjuli	Papum Pare	2002	Secondary	https://nirjuli.vkv.in
21	VKV Koloriang	Kurung Kumey	2003	Middle	http://koloriang.vkv.in
22	VKV Banderdewa	Papum Pare	2004	Secondary	https://banderdewa.vkv.in
23	VKV Wessang	East Kameng	2007	Secondary	https://wessang.vkv.in
24	VKV Basar	West Siang	2008	Middle	http://basar.vkv.in
25	VKV Vivek Vihar	Papum Pare	2009	Secondary	http://vivekvihar.vkv.in
26	VKV Joram	Lower Subansiri	2009	Middle	http://joram.vkv.in
27	VKV Raga	Lower Subansiri	2009	Middle	http://raga.vkv.in
28	VKV Dado	Kurung Kumey	2009	Primary	http://dado.vkv.in
29	VKV Emrs Bana	East Kameng	2009	Secondary	http://emrsbana.vkv.in
30	VKV Yingkiong	Upper Siang	2010	Secondary	http://yingkiong.vkv.in
31	VKV Changlang	Changlang	2010	Middle	http://changlang.vkv.in
32	VKV Tezu	Lohit	2010	Secondary	http://tezu.vkv.in
33	VKV Kitpi Tawang	West Kameng	2011	Secondary	http://kitpitawang.vkv.in/
34	VKV Dollungmukh	Lower Subansiri	2015	Middle	http://dollungmukh.vkv.in/
35	VKV Kimi	West Kameng	2016	Primary	http://kimi.vkv.in/
36	VKV Chyang Tajo	East Kameng	2016	Primary	
37	VKV Mukto	West Kameng	2018	Middle	
38	VKV Longding	Longding	2019	Primary	
39	VKV Gaga	Kurung Kumey	2019	Primary	
40	VKV Namsai	Namsai	2019	Primary	

=== In Assam ===
The schools in Assam are run and managed under Vivekananda Kendra Shiksha Prasar Vibhag (VKSPV) of Vivekananda Kendra headquartered at Guwahati in Assam.

Sl. No.	School	District	Year of Inception	Level	Website
1	VKV Tinsukia	Tinsukia	1978	Senior Secondary	VKV Tinsukia
2	VKV Dibrugarh	Dibrugarh	1981	Senior Secondary	VKV Dibrugarh
3	VKV Golaghat	Golaghat	1988	Senior Secondary	VKV Golaghat
4	VKV Bokuloni	Dibrugarh	1998	Senior Secondary	VKV Bokuloni (NEEPCO)
5	VKV Umrangso	N.C.Hills	1999	Senior Secondary	VKV Umrangso (NEEPCO)
6	VKV Baragolai	Tinsukia	2000	Senior Secondary	VKV Baragolai (NEC)
7	VKV Dhemaji	Dhemaji	2000	Secondary	
8	VKV Majuli	Jorhat	2002	Secondary	
9	VKV Tingrai	Dibrugarh	2002	Secondary	
10	VKV Nalbari	Nalbari	2004	Senior Secondary	
11	VKV Ramnagar Silchar	Cachar	2005	Secondary	
12	VKV Kajalgaon	Chirang (BTAD)	2007	Secondary	
13	VKVK Suklai	Baksa	2007	Secondary	
14	VKV Tezpur	Sonitpur	2009	Secondary	
15	VKV Badarpur	Karimganj	2009	Secondary	
16	VKV Sivasagar	Sivasagar	2010	Secondary	
17	VKPV Jengraimukh	Majuli	2012	Primary	
18	VKV Borojalenga	Cachar	2014	Secondary	
19	VKV Sadiya	Tinsukia	2014	Secondary	
20	VKV Tumpreng	West Karbi Anglong	2015	Secondary	
21	VKV Sissiborgaon	Dhemaji	2016	Primary	
22	VKV Bokakhat	Golaghat	2018	Primary	
23	VKV Khatkhati	(Khatkhati, Bokajan, Karbi Anglong)	2018	Primary	
24	VKV Mangaldai	Darrang	2018	Secondary	

=== In Nagaland ===
The schools in Nagaland are run and managed under Vivekananda Kendra Shiksha Prasar Vibhag (VKSPV) of Vivekananda Kendra headquartered at Guwahati in Assam.

Sl. No.	School	District	Year of Inception	Level	Website
1	VKV Doyang	Wokha	2000	Secondary	VKV Doyang (NEEPCO)

=== In Andaman ===
Ten schools are run in Andaman of which VKV, PortBlair situated in the capital of Andaman and Nicobar Islands is one among the oldest sools in the islands.

SCHOOL MAGAZINE

Vkv has school magazines called arohi published within each states they are in. Pictures of 10th and 12th graders, literature in english, hindi and sanskrit. Accomplishments of students etc. Are filled.
