= VKV Golaghat =

Primary and Secondary School in Assam, India

Vivekananda Kendra Vidyalaya Golaghat
- VKV Golaghat
- Logo of VKV Golaghat

Location
- Ward #4; Mission Road; Golaghat, Assam 785 621; India

Information
- School type: Private, Senior Secondary School
- Established: 1988; 38 years ago
- Founder: Vivekananda Kendra
- Sister school: VKV Dibrugarh
- School board: CBSE - AISSE (year 10); CBSE - AISSSE (year 12)
- Session: April to March
- Administrator: R. Devi (Joint Secretary, VKSPV)
- Principal: A. Goswami
- Gender: Coed
- Age: 5+ to 18+
  - Pre-kindergarten: 50
  - Kindergarten: 49
  - Grade 1: 106
  - Grade 2: 104
  - Grade 3: 99
  - Grade 4: 100
  - Grade 5: 105
  - Grade 6: 100
  - Grade 7: 92
  - Grade 8: 95
  - Grade 9: 94
  - Grade 10: 87
  - Grade 11: 35
  - Grade 12: 22
- Area: 16,187.4256 square kilometres (6,250.0000 sq mi)
- Campus type: Urban
- Houses: 10
- Nickname: Golaghat VKV
- Accreditation: C. B. S. E.

Vivekananda Kendra Vidyalaya Golaghat, (informally VKV Golaghat), is a Primary with Secondary and Senior Secondary school located at Ward # 4 on Mission Road, Golaghat in the state of Assam, India. Established in the year 1988 by Vivekananda Kendra, it's a coed day scholar cum residential school with English as the medium of instruction, besides equal emphasis in Asamiya and Hindi. The school celebrated its 25th anniversary in the year 2014.

== Overview ==
VKV Golaghat has classes from pre-kindergarten to 12. The school houses a common library along with a grass playground for its pupils. The administration of the school is headed by the Principal. Affiliated to CBSE, the school conducts AISSE for its pupils at grade 10 and All India Senior Secondary School Examination (AISSCE) for its pupils at grade 12. Almost all of the school's pupils go on to universities after completing their senior secondary examinations. The school celebrated its silver jubilee anniversary in the year 2014.

== History ==
Vivekananda Kendra Vidyalaya Golaghat was established in 1988 under the auspices of the Vivekananda Kendra, Kanyakumari – a spiritually oriented service mission. The school was constructed on a plot located on Mission Road, Golaghat, donated by Dr. Robin Banerjee, a Padma Shri awardee renowned humanitarian. The school began to operate in the year 1988 from its present premises and gradually expanded and became a Senior Secondary School.

== Present ==
Affiliated to the Central Board of Secondary Education (CBSE), New Delhi, VKV Golaghat is administrated by Vivekananda Kendra Shiksha Prasar Vibhag – the educational branch of Vivekananda Kendra, Kanyakumari, a spiritually orientated service organization inspired by the philosophies of Swami Vivekananda.

The available subject combinations for grade 12 students are:
Senior Secondary Course (Science):

- Compulsory: Physics, Chemistry, Mathematics, English.
- Optional: Computer science, Biology

Secondary Course (Commerce):

- Compulsory: Accountancy, Business studies, English, Economics.
- Optional: Computer science, Mathematics, Informatics practices

The first batch of Secondary students (Class X) passed in the year 2000. The institute has classes from Pre-nursery to Class XII and has separate Computer, Physics, Chemistry, Biology laboratories for higher studies. Physical training, Art and craft, Yoga and Music are other soft skills taught to its pupils.

== Sports ==
The school is known to have good sports' performers and have maintained a good reputation in All India CBSE sports, including securing 2nd position in 50m backstroke at East Zone CBSE swimming tournament.

== See also ==
- Vivekananda Kendra Vidyalaya
- Golaghat district
- Education in Assam
