= Swami Vivekananda and meditation =

Indian Hindu teacher's meditation

Meditation played a very important role in the life and teachings of Swami Vivekananda. He was interested in meditation from his childhood. His master Ramakrishna found him a dhyana - siddha (expert in meditation). On 24 December 1892, Vivekananda reached Kanyakumari and meditated for three days on a large rock and took the resolution to dedicate his life to serve humanity. The event is known as the Kanyakumari resolve of 1892. He reportedly also meditated for a long time on the day of his death (4 July 1902).

Vivekananda is considered as the introducer of meditation to the Western countries. In his book Raja Yoga and lectures, he widely discussed meditation, its purpose and procedure. He described "meditation" as a bridge that connects the human soul to the God. He defined "meditation" as a state "when the mind has been trained to remain fixed on a certain internal or external location, there comes to it the power of flowing in an unbroken current, as it were, towards that point."

== Meditation in Vivekananda's life ==
Meditation, which gives an insight to the depth and breadth of the mystical traditions of India, was developed by Ancient Hindu Sages. He propagated it to the world through his lectures and practical lessons. He stressed the need to concentrate on the mind, which is a lamp that gives insight to every part of our soul.

Vivekananda defined meditation, first, as a process of self-appraisal of all thoughts to the mind. He then defined the next step as to “Assert what we really are — existence, knowledge and bliss — being, knowing, and loving,” which would result in “Unification of the subject and object.”

Vivekananda's meditation is practiced under the two themes of “Meditation according to Yoga” which is considered a practical and mystical approach, and of “Meditation according to Vedanta” which means a philosophical and transcendental approach. Both themes have the same end objective of realizing illumination through realization of the “Supreme”.

=== Childhood ===
Vivekananda was born on 12 January 1863 in Calcutta (now Kolkata). From his very childhood, he was deeply interested in meditation and used to meditate before the images of deities such as Lord Shiva, Lord Rama, and Sita. He was able to practice deep meditation at the age of eight.

In his childhood, when Narendra was playing meditation with his friend, suddenly a cobra appeared, frightening Narendra's friends, who then fled. But Narendra was absorbed in meditation and did not notice the cobra nor hear his friends' calls.

=== Youth (1881—1886) ===
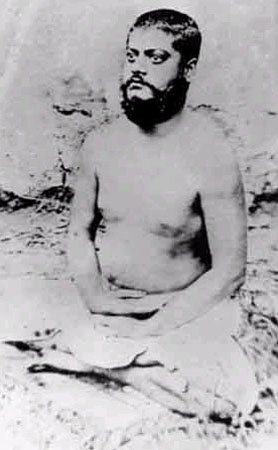
Vivekananda meditating in Cossipore, 1886

When Vivekananda (then Narendra Nath Dutta) met Ramakrishna in 1881, the latter found Vivekananda dhyana–siddha (expert in meditation). Between 1881 and 1886, as an apprentice of Ramakrishna, he took meditation lessons from him, which made his expertise on meditation more firm. Narendra wanted to experience Nirvikalpa Samadhi (the highest stage of meditation) and so requested Ramakrishna to help him to attain that state. But Ramakrishna wanted young Narendra to devote to the service of mankind, and told him that desiring to remain absorbed in Samadhi was a small-minded desire. He also assured him that one could go to "a state higher even than that" by serving mankind, because everything is God's own manifestation. This dictum of Ramakrishna deeply influenced Narendranath.

=== Experience of Nirvikalpa Samadhi in Cossipore Garden House ===
Narendranath first experienced Nirvikalpa Samadhi at Cossipore Garden House in Calcutta. One evening, when he was meditating with his friend Gopal (senior), he suddenly felt a light behind his head. As he concentrated on the light, it became more luminous. Narendra concentrated further on the light and found it getting subsumed in to "the Absolute". He became unconscious. When he regained consciousness after sometime, his first question was "Gopal–da, where is my body?" Gopal felt worried and informed this event to Ramakrishna.

=== Meditation at Baranagar Math ===
After the death of Ramakrishna in August 1886, Narendra and few other monastic disciples of Ramakrishna converted a dilapidated house at Baranagar into a new math (monastery). There they practiced religious austerities and meditation. Narendra later reminisced about his days at the Baranagar math:

We underwent a lot of religious practice at the Baranagar Math. We used to get up at 3:00 am and become absorbed in japa and meditation. What a strong spirit of detachment we had in those days! We had no thought even as to whether the world existed or not.

=== Meditation during the Wandering years ===
Between 1888 and 1893, Narendranath travelled all over India as a Parivrajaka Sadhu, a wandering monk, and visited many states and holy sites. During his tours he always wanted to live in secluded locations where he could stay alone and concentrate on meditation. During these lonely years, he reportedly gained inspiration from the words of Gautama Buddha—

Go forward without a path,
Fearing nothing, caring for nothing!
Wandering alone, like the rhinoceros!
Even as a lion, not trembling at noises,
Even as the wind, not caught in the net,
Even as the lotus leaf, untainted by water,
Do thou wander alone, like the rhinoceros!

Once when Narendra was meditating under a peepul tree in the Himalayas, he realized the oneness of man and all other objects in the universe and that man was just a miniature of the whole universe, i.e., the human life follows the same rules as applicable for the whole universe. He wrote about this experience to his brother-disciple Swami Ashokananada.

=== Kanyakumari resolve of 1892 ===
Vivekananda reached Kanyakumari on 24 December 1892 and meditated for a three-day stretch, from 25 December to 27 December, on a large mid-sea rock, on aspects of India's past, present, and future. There he reportedly had a "Vision of one India" and took the resolve to dedicate his life for the service of humanity. This resolve of 1892 is known as "Kanyakumari resolve of 1892".

=== Meditation in the West ===
In 1893 Vivekananda travelled to the West and participated in the Parliament of the World's Religions, which was held in Chicago in that year. Between 1893 and 1897, he conducted hundreds of public and private lectures and classes in the United States and England. Even during these active days he continued meditating on a regular basis, and his hectic work schedule could not disturb his meditations.

=== Meditation on 4 July 1902 ===
Vivekananda died a few minutes after 9 pm on 4 July 1902. Even on that day, he practiced meditation for many hours. He also sang a devotional song on Hindu goddess Kali. This was his last meditation.

== The Great Swami Vivekananda's teachings on meditation ==
Vivekananda is considered as the introducer of meditation to the Western countries. He realized "concentration is the essence of all knowledge" and meditation plays an important role in strengthening one's concentration. He said "man-making" was his mission, and he felt for that we needed a composite culture of knowledge, work, love and meditated mind. He stressed on practicing meditation on a regular basis. Vivekananda told, meditation not only improves one's concentration, but also improves his behavioural control.

=== Definition of Dhyana (meditation) ===
To Vivekananda, meditation (Dhyana) was a bridge that connected human soul to the God, the Supreme. He defined Dhyana meditation as—

When the mind has been trained to remain fixed on a certain internal or external location, there comes to it the power of flowing in an unbroken current, as it were, towards that point. This state is called Dhyana. When one has so intensified the power of Dhyana as to be able to reject the external part of perception and remain meditating only on the internal part, the meaning, that state is called Samadhi.

=== Procedure of meditation suggested by Vivekananda ===
In the book Raja Yoga and several other lectures, Vivekananda also suggested the procedure of meditation. He said—

First, to sit in the posture In which you can sit still for a long time. All the nerve currents which are working pass along the spine. The spine is not intended to support the weight of the body. Therefore the posture must be such that the weight of the body is not on the spine. Let it be free from all pressure.

Vivekananda published a summary of Raja Yoga from Kurma Purana. In the summary, he defined the meaning, purpose and procedure of meditation. The procedures of meditation—

Sit straight, and concentrate on the divine light between the eyebrows that's what he meant by Samprkeshy Nasikagram (ie place between your eyebrows, not on your nose tip). This whole process of divine meditation can only be initiated by an enlightened master who himself have seen God and can make you see that right at the time of Deeksha. Later on, we have to concentrate our mind on that divine light. And after daily practicing, you can attain the oneness with God. He who has given up all attachment, all fear, and all anger, he whose whole soul has gone unto the Lord, he who has taken refuge in the Lord, whose heart has become purified, with whatsoever desire he comes to the Lord, He will grant that to him. Therefore worship Him through knowledge, love, or renunciation.
