= All French Indian Congress =

Former political party in French India

The All French Indian Congress was a political party in French India. The organization was founded in 1946 by Muthu Venkatapathy Reddiar and C.A. Rathinam, as a rival organization to the established French India National Congress. There were no significant political differences between the two parties, though.

The All French Indian Congress was supposed to have been inaugurated by M. Bhakthavatsalam on 30 September, at a meeting presided by K. Kamaraj. These plans infuriated the French India National Congress, which deplored the involvement of the Tamil Nadu Congress in supporting the rival organization. The French India National Congress charged that the new party was dominated by communists, whilst the accused replied by questioning the national character of the older party. In the end French authorities banned foreign citizens from speaking at public meetings.
