= Jayanthi Natarajan =

Indian lawyer and politician

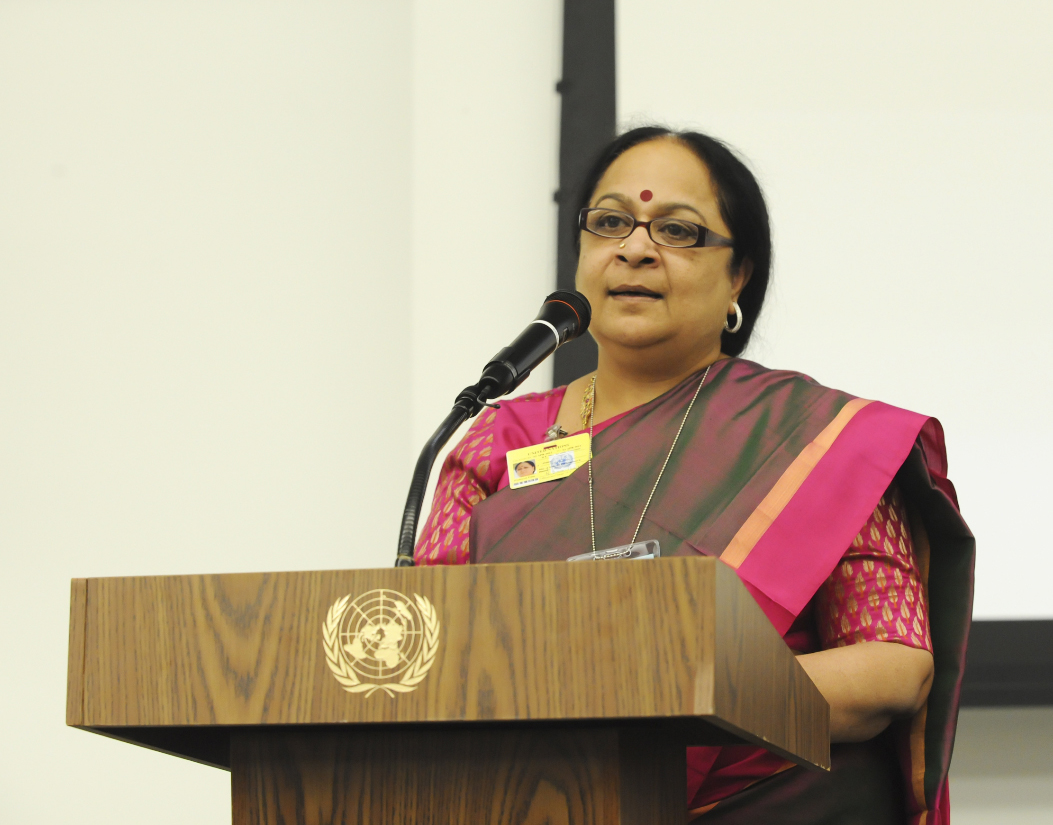
- Jayanthi Natarajan in New York 2012

Minister of Environment and Forests (Independent Charge)
- In office 12 July 2011 – 20 December 2013 (resigned)
- Prime Minister: Manmohan Singh

Minister of State for Coal, Civil Aviation and Parliamentary Affairs
- In office 1997–1998
- Prime Minister: Inder Kumar Gujral

Member of Parliament – Rajya Sabha from Tamil Nadu
- In office 2008–2014
- In office 1986–2002

Personal details
- Born: 7 June 1954 (age 72) Madras, Madras State (now Chennai, Tamil Nadu), India
- Party: Indian National Congress (1982–1997, 2002–2015); Tamil Maanila Congress (1997–2002)
- Spouse: V. K. Natarajan
- Children: 1 (son)
- Education: Ethiraj College for Women
- As of 26 January, 2007

Jayanthi Natarajan (born 7 June 1954) is an Indian lawyer and politician. She was a member of the Indian National Congress and has been thrice elected Member of Parliament representing the state of Tamil Nadu in the Rajya Sabha. From July 2011 to December 2013, she was the Minister of Forests and Environment (Independent Charge). She resigned as Minister of Environment and Forest on 21 December 2013. On 30 January 2015, she announced in a press conference at Chennai that she would be resigning from the Congress party alleging that "specific requests" by Rahul Gandhi were the basis of whether industrial projects were given clearances by her ministry, and that he shifted from a pro-environmental position to corporate-friendly stand for the elections in 2014.

== Early years ==
Jayanthi Natarajan was born in Madras, India. She was born to Dr. C R Sundararajan and Rukmini Sundararajan. Jayanthi Natarajan is the niece of notable social worker Sarojini Varadappan. Her maternal grandfather was M. Bakthavatsalam, a prominent Congress politician and the Chief Minister of Tamil Nadu between 1963 and 1967. She did her schooling from a prominent Chennai school, Sacred Heart Matriculation Higher Secondary School, Church Park. Jayanthi studied at Ethiraj College for Women before pursuing law and became a practicing advocate in Madras. Apart from her commercial practice, she also did pro bono work for a number of social organizations including the All India Women's Conference, and the legal aid board. She also worked briefly as a newscaster for Doordarshan Kendra, Madras

== Rajya Sabha Election History ==
Position	Party	Constituency	From	To	Tenure
Member of Parliament, Rajya Sabha (1st Term)	INC	Tamil Nadu	30 June 1986	29 June 1992	5 years, 365 days
Member of Parliament, Rajya Sabha (2nd Term)	INC	Tamil Nadu	30 June 1992	9 September 1997	5 years, 71 days
Member of Parliament, Rajya Sabha (3rd Term)	TMC(M)	Tamil Nadu	10 October 1997	24 July 2001	3 years, 287 days
Member of Parliament, Rajya Sabha (4th Term)	INC	Tamil Nadu	3 April 2008	2 April 2014	5 years, 364 days

== Political career ==
=== Congress Years ===
Her political career began when she was noticed by Rajiv Gandhi in the 1980s. She was first elected to the Rajya Sabha in 1986 and once again in 1992.

=== Tamil Maanila Congress ===
During the 90's Jayanthi Natarajan and other leaders from Tamil Nadu who were unhappy with Narasimha Rao decided to break away from the party. They founded the Tamil Maanila Congress under G K Moopanar. Jayanthi Natarajan resigned from the Rajya Sabha and was re-elected in 1997 as a TMC member.

The TMC was allied with the Dravida Munnetra Kazhagam in Tamil Nadu and was a part of the United Front government in the centre. Jayanthi Natarajan was appointed Minister of State for Coal, Civil Aviation and Parliamentary Affairs in 1997.

=== Return to the Congress ===
With Moopanar's death, the TMC leaders decided to merge with the Congress. Jayanthi Natarajan was noticed by Sonia Gandhi and appointed spokesperson for the party. She replaced Mr. Jairam Ramesh as Environment Minister on 12 July 2011 in the UPA led Union Government. She served as the Minister of State for Environment and forests (Independent Charge) from 12 July 2011 to 20 December 2013. She was allegedly asked to resign from her post to work for the Congress party in the run up to the General Elections of 2014.

=== Resignation from the Congress Party ===
Also see Sahara-Birla Diaries Scandal

Due to her name appearing in the Sahara Diaries amongst hundreds of politicians who had been paid for environmental clearances, Natarajan was asked by many in the Congress to resign due to accusations of corruption. This had been alluded to by Narendra Modi as "Jayanthi tax" during his 2014 election rhetoric. However, further evidence started to turn up in 2015. After the Sahara Diaries investigation Natarajan resigned from the Congress Party on 30 January 2015. In a letter written to Sonia Gandhi, Jayanti Natarajan accused the party machinery, Rahul Gandhi in particular, of having worked towards a campaign to malign her and her reputation. She also believed, according to the letter, that she was being made a scapegoat for the economic policy paralysis observed in the UPA-II government. She believed that while she took decisions of halting certain industrial and infrastructure projects at the behest of Mr. Rahul Gandhi, certain sections of the party spread rumors that she was made to resign on 20 December 2013 due to her stance on these projects. She planned to join with TMC, but noticing the strength of TMC she discarded the decision. The Congress maintained that it was the party which had asked Natarajan to resign. In September 2017, a CBI raid was carried out on her properties in Delhi and Chennai.
