= Sarojini Varadappan =

Indian activist (1921–2013)

Sarojini Varathappan
- Born: 21 September 1921; Madras, Madras Presidency, British India
- Died: 17 October 2013 (aged 92); Chennai, Tamil Nadu, India
- Occupations: Social worker, indian independence movement / indian independence activist
- Spouse: Varadappan

Sarojini Varadappan (21 September 1921 − 17 October 2013) was an Indian politician, educationist and social worker from the state of Tamil Nadu. She was the daughter of former Chief Minister of Madras, M. Bhaktavatsalam.

== Early life ==
Sarojini was born in Madras on 21 September 1921 to Bhaktavatsalam and Gnanasundarambal. Her father Bhaktavatsalam was a student at the Madras Law college when she was born. She studied till ninth standard at Lady Sivaswami Girls School when her education was discontinued. She studied Hindi through private home tuitions and completed her Visharadh. As her family objected to her travelling to an exam center to write her exams, her Prathmic exams were conducted at home. In her later years, she explained that her education was curtailed due to the conservativeness of her family. She was associated with the Indian National Congress and the Congress Seva Dal during her early days.

At an early age, she was married to her cousin Varadappan. Sarojini was 21 years old when her father was arrested at the height of the Quit India Movement. After two years of imprisonment, he was released in 1944.

Sarojini resumed her studies after marriage and completed her Master's in political science from Mysore University through correspondence. She also did her MA in Vaishnavism from Madras University. Sarojini got her PhD at the age of 80 for her thesis on "Social Service and the Swami Narayan Movement". Sarojini is also an ardent devotee of the Paramacharya of Kanchi, Chandrasekharendra Saraswathi. Her niece Mrs. Jayanthi Natarajan was a minister in the central cabinet. She died on 17 October 2013, at the age of 92.

== Music ==
Sarojini learnt music from Parur Sundaram Iyer and sung prayer songs at Congress meetings. She also learnt Kshetragna padams and Tamil padams from Mylapore Gowri Ammal, Bharatiyar songs from E. Krishna Iyer and Hindi bhajans from Veena Visalakshi.

== Social activities ==
Sarojini was involved in social activities ever since her early days. Her mother Gnanasundarambal was associated with the Women's India Association (WIA) and Sarojini joined the organisation at an early age. Sarojini also served as the President of the WIA. Under her leadership, the number of branches of the organisation increased from four to 76. Sarojini is also the president of the Mylapore Academy.

Sarojini has been a member of the Indian Red Cross Society for over 35 years. When Marri Chenna Reddy was the Governor of Tamil Nadu, she was appointed President of the society. This was contrary to the usual practice of requesting the Governor's wife to preside over the society. When contacted, Channa Reddy's wife had declined the request due to her lack of proficiency in Tamil and instead asked Sarojini to preside over the organisation.

She served as the chairperson of Central Social Welfare Board of Government of India from 1973 to 1977. In 1987, Government of India appointed the High Power Committee on Nursing and Nursing Profession with Sarojini Varadappan as its chairperson to review the roles, functions, status, preparation of the Nursing Personnel, nursing services and other issues related to the development of Nursing profession and to make suitable recommendation to the Government. The committee submitted its report in 1989.

== Honours ==
Sarojini was awarded India's fourth highest civilian award, the Padma Shri in 1973. She was awarded the Jankidevi Bajaj award for 2004 at a function in Chennai held on 23 February 2005. The same year, she received Jamnalal Bajaj Award from the Jamnalal Bajaj Foundation. In 2009, Sarojini was awarded India's third highest civilian award, the Padma Bhushan for social service. On 5 March 2009, she was honoured at a function in Chennai. She was selected Sheriff of Madras for 1983.
