= M. Bhaktavatsalam =

Indian politician (1897-1987)

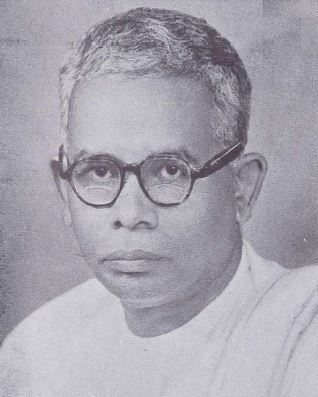

4th Chief Minister of Madras State
- In office 2 October 1963 – 5 March 1967
- Preceded by: K. Kamaraj
- Succeeded by: C. N. Annadurai

Minister of Finance and Education, Madras State
- In office 3 March 1962 – 2 October 1963
- Chief Minister: K. Kamaraj

Minister of Home Affairs, Madras State
- In office 13 April 1957 – 15 March 1962
- Chief Minister: K. Kamaraj
- Preceded by: K. Kamaraj
- Succeeded by: K. Kamaraj

Minister of Agriculture, Madras State
- In office 13 April 1954 – 15 March 1962
- Chief Minister: K. Kamaraj
- Preceded by: R. Nagana Goud
- Succeeded by: P. Kakkan

Minister of Public Works and Information, Madras Presidency/Madras Province
- In office 24 March 1947 – 6 April 1949
- Chief Minister: O. P. Ramaswamy Reddiyar

Personal details
- Born: 9 October 1897 Nazarethpettai, Madras Presidency, British India (present-day Tamil Nadu, India)
- Died: 13 February 1987 (aged 89) Madras, Tamil Nadu, India (present-day Chennai)
- Resting place: Bhaktavatsalam Memorial
- Party: Indian National Congress
- Spouse: Gnanasundarambal
- Children: Sarojini Varadappan
- Occupation: Politician

Minjur Bhaktavatsalam (9 October 1897 – 13 February 1987) was an Indian independence activist and politician who served as the chief minister of Madras State from 2 October 1963 to 6 March 1967. He was the last Congress chief minister of Tamil Nadu and the last to have taken part in the Indian independence movement.

Bhaktavatsalam was born on 9 October 1897 in the Madras Presidency. He studied law and practised as an advocate in the Madras High Court. He involved himself in politics and the freedom movement right from an early age and was imprisoned during the Salt Satyagraha and the Quit India Movement. He was elected to the Madras Legislative Assembly in 1937 and served as Parliamentary Secretary in the Rajaji government and as a minister in the O. P. Ramaswamy Reddiyar government. He led the Indian National Congress during the 1950s and served as the Chief Minister of Madras Presidency from 1963 to 1967. Following the defeat of the Indian National Congress in the 1967 elections, Bhaktavatsalam partially retired from politics. He died on 13 February 1987 at the age of 89.

== Early life ==
Bhaktavatsalam was born to C. N. Kanakasabhapati Mudaliar and his wife Mallika in a Shaiva Vellalar family of Nazarethpet or Nazareth village, Madras Presidency. His father died when he was five and Bhaktavatsalam was brought up by his uncles C. N. Muthuranga Mudaliar and C. N. Evalappa Mudaliar. He completed his schooling in Madras and enrolled at Madras Law College. On graduation in 1923, Bhaktavatsalam commenced practice as a lawyer of the Madras High Court.

== Indian Independence Movement ==
Bhaktavatsalam joined the Indian Independence Movement even during graduation. He joined the Indian National Congress and became a member of the Madras Provincial Congress Committee in 1922. In 1926, he became a member of the Congress Working Committee.

Bhaktavatsalam started the daily newspaper India which he managed till 1933. He was the Secretary of the Tamil Nadu Congress Civic Board during the district board and municipal elections of 1935 and 1926. He also served as the Secretary of the Madras Mahajana Sabha for sometime.

Bhaktavatsalam was injured during the Salt Satyagraha at Vedaranyam. He was arrested in 1932 for conducting India's independence day celebrations and spent six months in prison. In the 1936 municipal body elections, Bhaktavatsalam was elected to the Madras City Corporation and served as Deputy Mayor.

=== Quit India Movement ===
At the age of 40, Bhaktavatsalam entered the Madras Assembly successfully winning the Thiruvallur seat in 1937 election. Bhaktavatsalam served as the Parliamentary Secretary to the Minister of Local Self-Government in the Rajaji government. Bhaktavatsalam resigned along with the other office-holders of the Indian National Congress on declaration of war by the United Kingdom.

Bhaktavatsalam participated in the Quit India Movement agitations and was jailed by the British. On his release in 1944, he elected to the Constituent Assembly of India.

== Indian independence and the Kamaraj era ==
Bhaktavatsalam stood in the Madras Assembly elections held in 1946 and was re-elected. He served as the Minister of Public Works and Information in the O. P. Ramaswamy Reddiyar cabinet. In the 1952 Assembly elections, the first in independent India, Bhaktavatsalam lost in Ponneri constituency. In 1957, he won the Sriperumbudur seat and entered the Assembly. He was appointed the Home Minister in the Kamaraj' cabinet and leader of the Tamil Nadu Legislative Assembly House.

== Chief Minister of Madras state ==
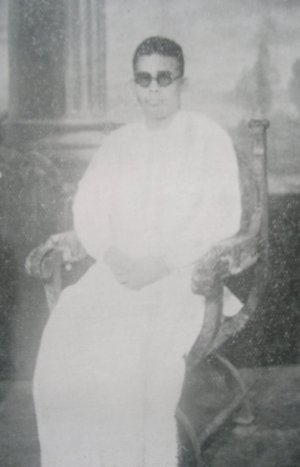
Bhaktavatsalam at the Haripura session of the Indian National Congress, ca. 1938

In 1962, the Indian National Congress won the assembly elections and formed the government in the state for the fifth time in 25 years. Winning again the Sriperumbudur seat, Bhaktavatsalam entered the Assembly. On Gandhi Jayanti day, 2 October 1963, Bhaktavatsalam took office as the Chief Minister of Madras, after Kamaraj resigned to spend more time as an office bearer of the Congress. Bhaktavatsalam is, till date, the last Chief Minister of Madras from the Indian National Congress.

=== Construction of the Vivekananda Rock Memorial ===
In August 1963, M. S. Golwalkar, the Sarsangchalak of the Rashtriya Swayamsevak Sangh established a Swami Vivekananda Centenary Committee and a Vivekananda Rock Memorial Committee and appointed Eknath Ranade as its secretary. The main function of the committee was to construct a rock memorial at Kanyakumari in order to honour Swami Vivekananda on his birth centenary. The Chief Minister Bhaktavatsam and the Union Minister for Cultural Affairs, Humayun Kabir vehemently opposed the move. However, Bhaktavatsalam yielded when Ranade presented him a letter with signatures of 323 members of Parliament in support of a memorial.

=== Anti Hindi imposition agitations ===
Bhaktavatsalam's tenure as Chief Minister witnessed severe anti-Hindi agitations in Madras state. Bhaktavatsalam supported the Union Government's decision to introduce Hindi as compulsory language and rejected the demands to make Tamil the medium of instruction in colleges saying that it was "not a practical proposition, not in the interests of national integration, not in the interests of higher education, and not in the interests of the students themselves". On 7 March 1964, at a session of the Madras Legislative Assembly, Bhaktavatsalam recommended the introduction of a three-language formula comprising English, Hindi and Tamil.

As 26 January 1965, the day when the 15-year-long transition period recommended by the Indian Parliament came to an end, neared, the agitations intensified leading to police action and casualties. Six of the agitators (Chinnasami, Sivalingam, Aranganathan, Veerappan, Mutthu, and Sarangapani) immolated themselves while three others (Dandapani, Mutthu, and Shanmugam) consumed poison. One of the agitators, eighteen-year-old Rajendran was killed on 27 January 1965 as a result of police firing.

=== Criticism of Bhaktavatsalam's regime ===
On 13 February 1965, Bhaktavatsalam claimed that the opposition Dravida Munnetra Kazhagam and the Left parties were responsible for the large scale destruction of public property and violence during the anti-Hindi agitations of 1965.

In January 2015, E V K S Elangovan, the chief of the Tamil Nadu Congress Committee (TNCC), (whilst reacting to the news of Bhaktavatsalam's grand daughter Jayanthi Natarajan resigning from the congress), blamed Bhaktavatsalam for killing of many anti-Hindi protestors. Further, he also blamed Bhaktavatsalam for ending the distribution of subsidised rice in the PDS (started by K. Kamaraj), ending the golden rule of Kamraj in Tamil Nadu.

== Later life and death ==
Bhaktavatsalam died at the age of 89. His tomb is situated next to Kamaraj tomb in Guindy.

== Family ==
Bhaktavatsalam was related by marriage to some noted political families of Tamil Nadu. The Indian National Congress politician and Union Minister O. V. Alagesan and former Chief Minister of Madras Presidency, P. T. Rajan were brothers-in-law of Bhaktavatsalam. Bhaktavatsalam's daughter Sarojini Varadappan is a social activist while his granddaughter Jayanthi Natarajan was a politician of the Indian National Congress, Rajya Sabha member and former Union minister.

== Books authored ==
- Bhaktavatsalam, M.; K. Perumal Udayar (1978). The Absurdity of Anti-Hindi Policy: M. Bhaktavatsalam Speaks on Language Issue. Perumal Udayar.
- Bhaktavatsalam, M. (1985). West Asia: Problems and Prospects. Stosius Inc/Advent Books Division. ISBN 0-86590-594-0.

== Images ==
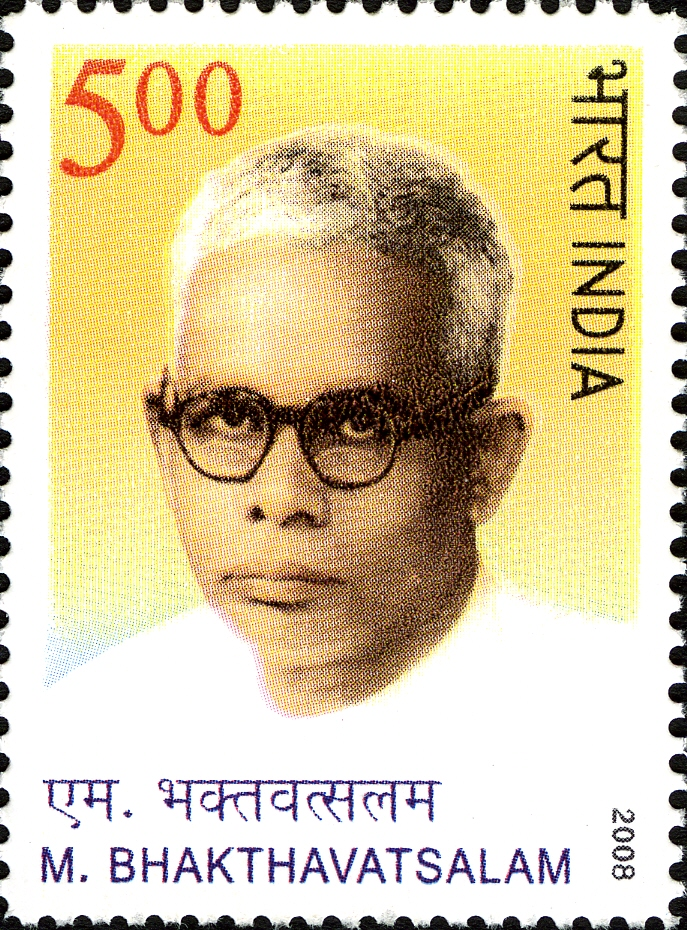
Commemorative stamp

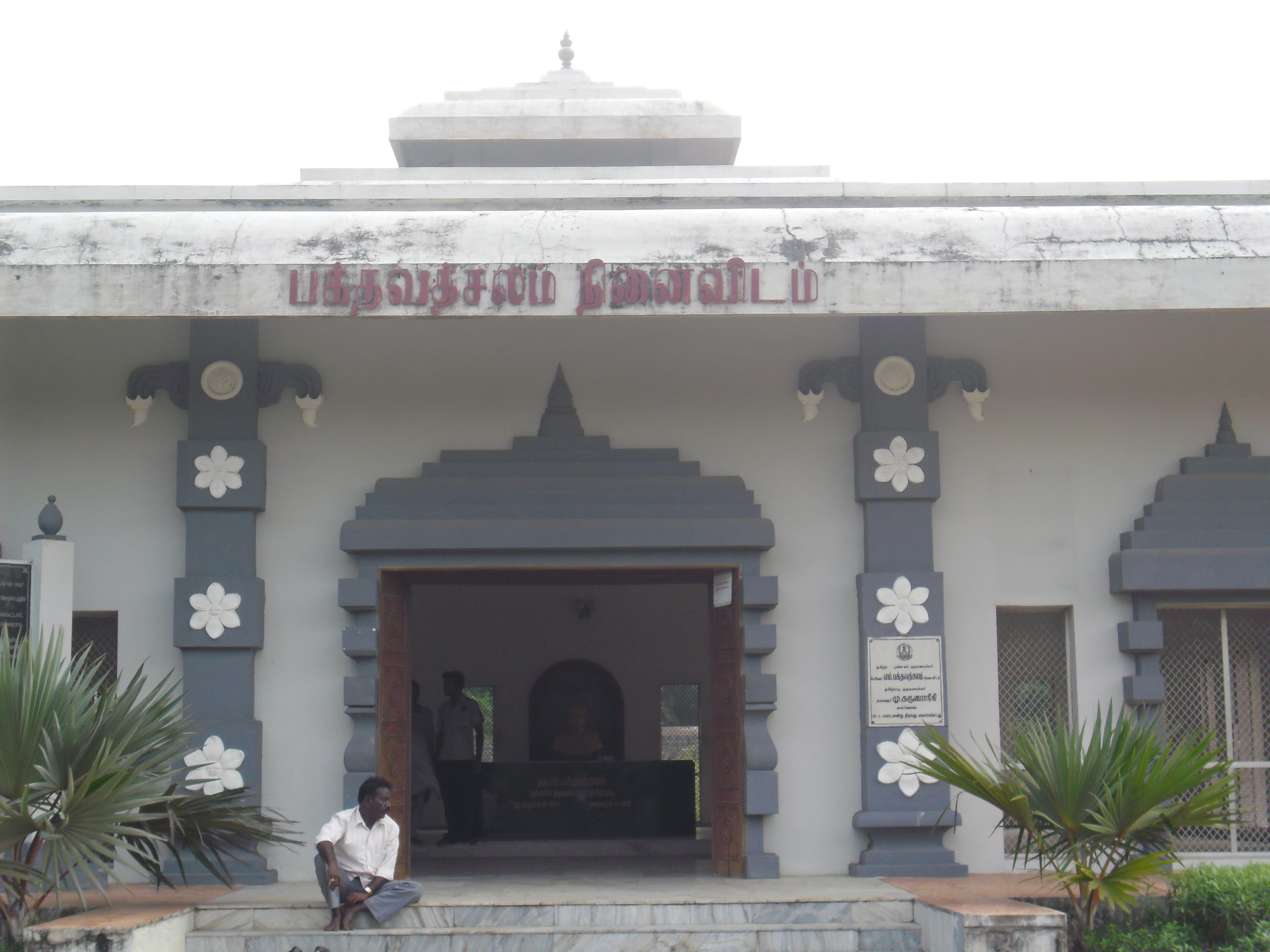
Bhaktavatsalam memorial, Gandhi Mandapam (Chennai)

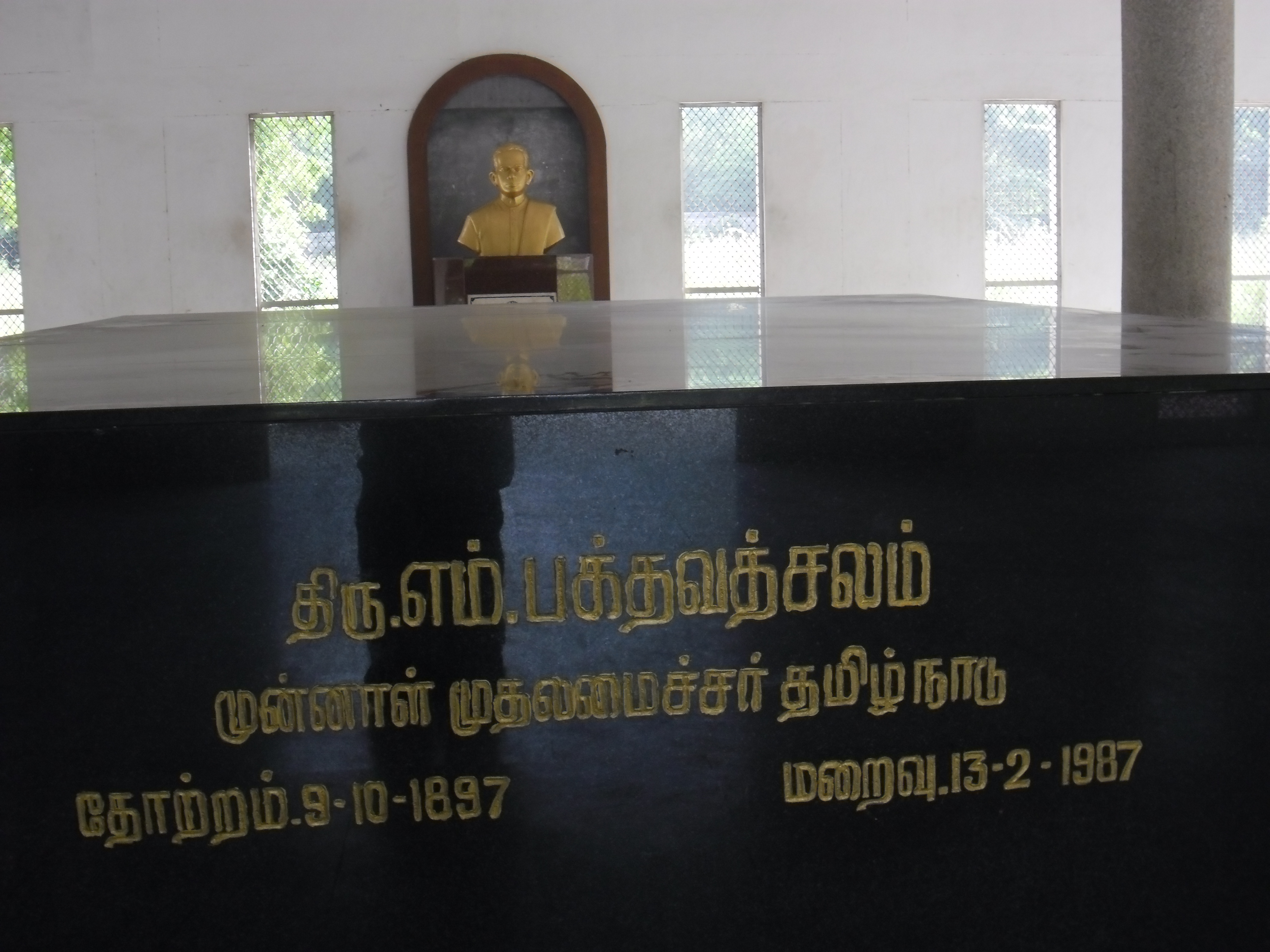
Inside Bhaktavatsalam memorial

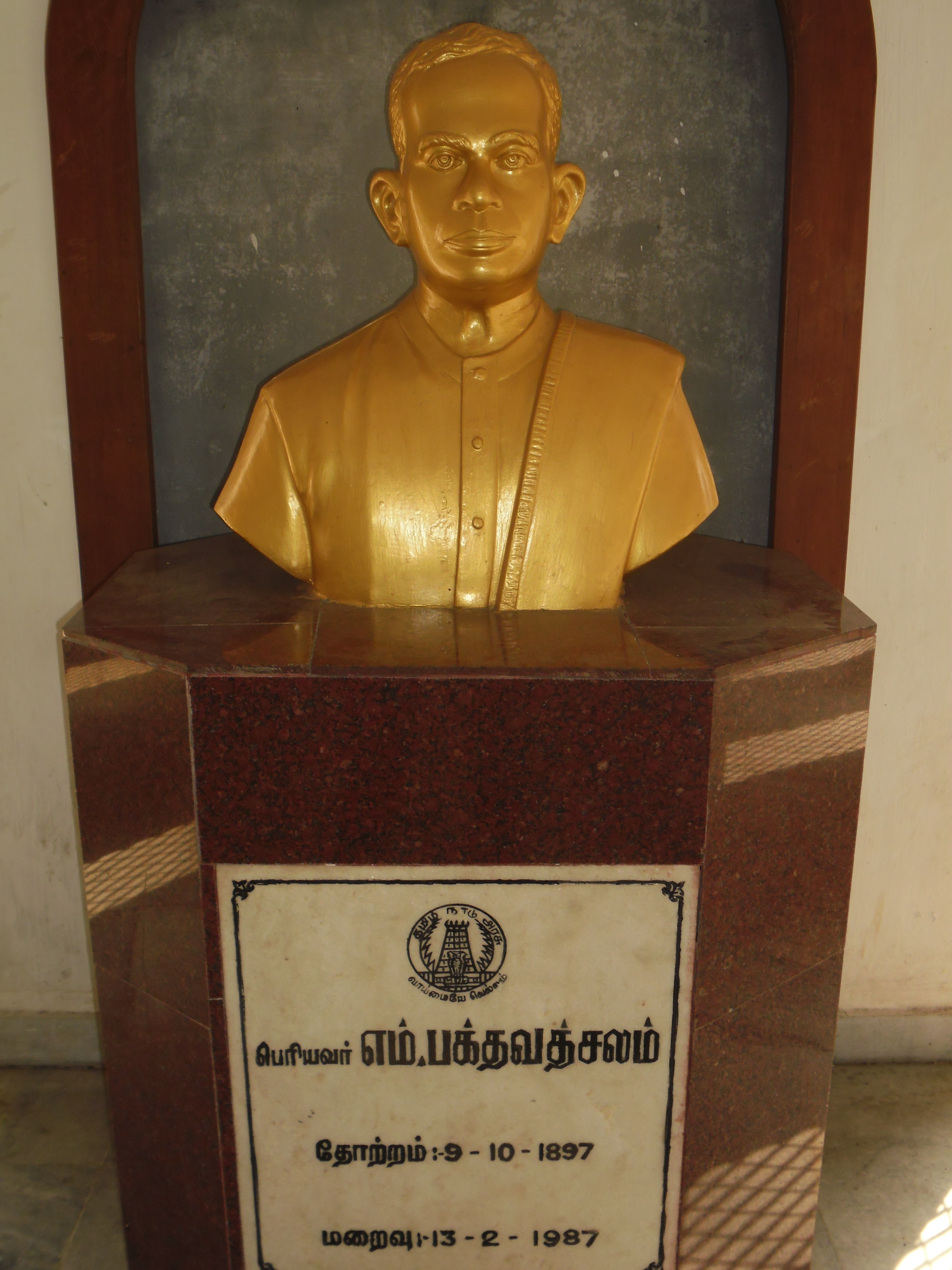
A bust of Bhaktavatsalam

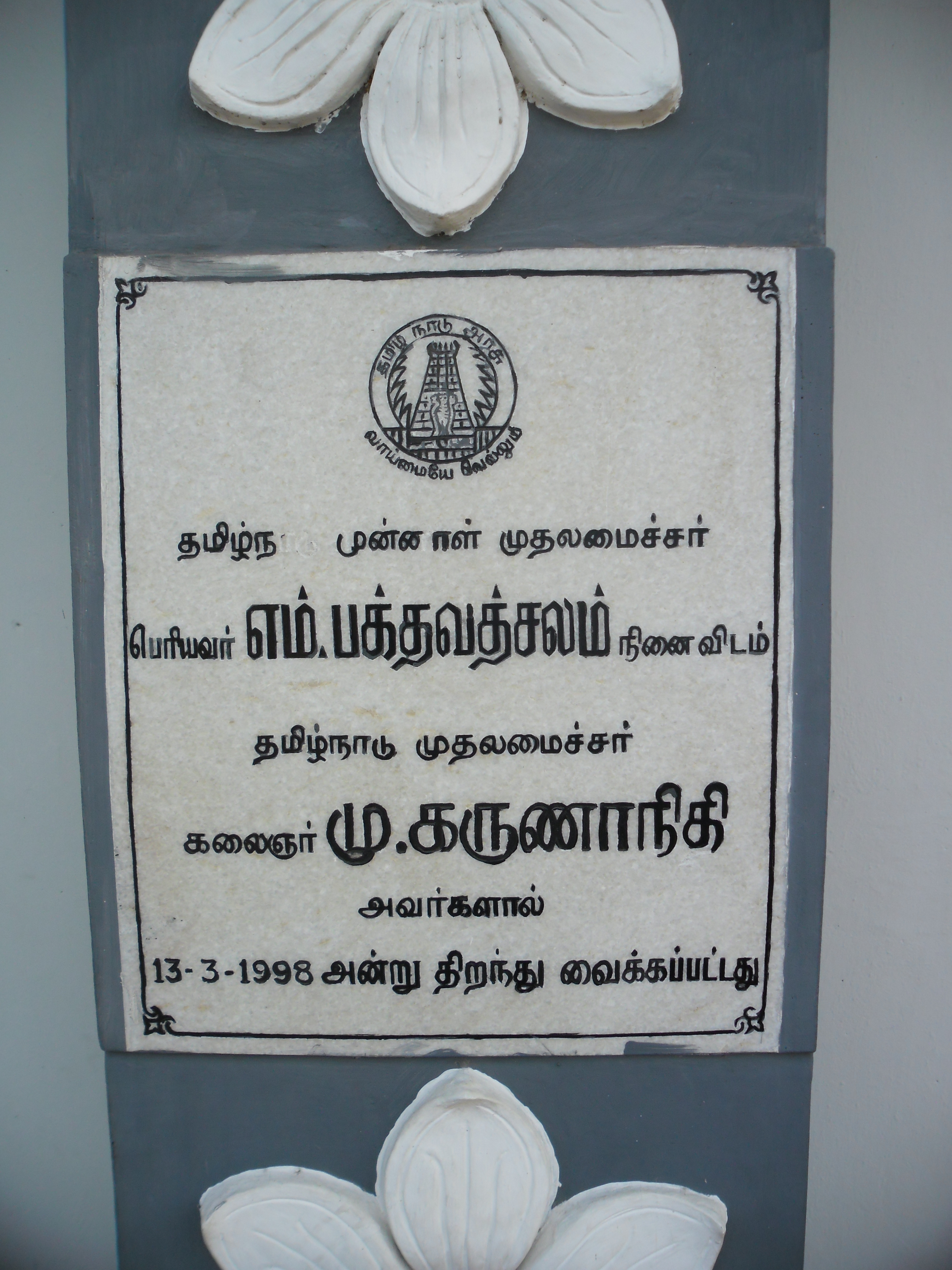
An inscription for Bhaktavatsalam

== Notes ==
Political offices
Preceded by K. Kamaraj	Chief Minister of Madras state 2 October 1963 – 6 March 1967	Succeeded by C. N. Annadurai
