= Kanyakumari resolve of 1892 =

Resolution taken by Indian Hindu monk Swami Vivekananda

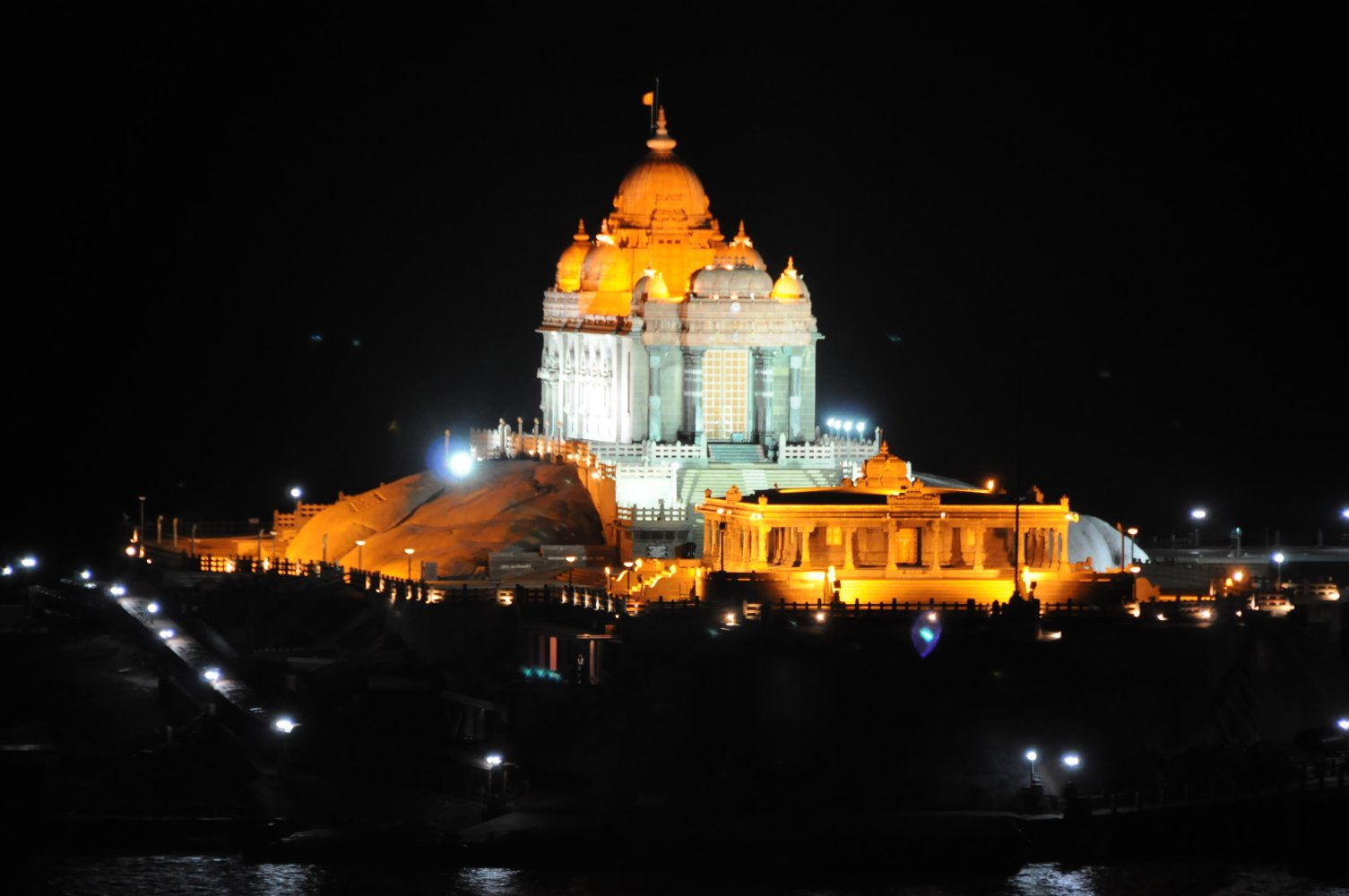
Vivekananda Rock Memorial.

The Kanyakumari resolve of 1892 was the resolution taken by Indian Hindu monk Swami Vivekananda to dedicate himself for the service and the welfare of people. In 1970 Vivekananda Rock Memorial was founded at the place where Vivekananda took this resolution.

== Background ==
Ramakrishna, the spiritual teacher of Vivekananda, desired to see his disciple dedicate his life to the welfare of the society. After the death of Ramakrishna in 1886, Narendranath Datta (Pre-monastic name of Swami Vivekananda) and other disciples founded their first monastery at Baranagar.

In 1888, Narendranath Datta left the monastery as a parivrajaka (meaning: "the Hindu religious life of a wandering monk") "without fixed abode, without ties, independent and strangers wherever they go". Between 1888 and 1893 he traveled extensively in several states of India. In 1888, he visited several places of Northern India like Ayodhya, Lucknow, Agra, Vrindavan, Hathras and Rishikesh. Between 1888 and 1890, Vivekananda visited Vaidyanath and Allahabad.

In 1891, he travelled to Ahmedabad, Wadhwan and Limbdi. He also visited Girnar, Kutch, Porbander, Dwaraka, Palitana, Nadiad, Nadiad ni haveli, and Baroda.

In 1892, he went to South India. He first travelled to Bangalore and then visited other cities like Trissur, Kodungalloor, Ernakulam, Nagercoil and Trivandrum. He offered worship at Rameswaram and finally reached Kanyakumari on 24 December 1892.

== Kanyakumari resolve ==
During his wandering years, Vivekananda had experienced the sufferings and problems faced by common people. Poverty, lack of self-respect, and education pained him. He wanted to help these poor people. He wanted to restore the dignity and self-respect of these people.

When Vivekananda reached Kanyakumari on 24 December 1892, he was still unable to formulate an idea to help the masses of the country. In Kanyakumari, he swam across the ocean to reach a large mid-sea rock. There he sat on the rock and started meditating on India's past, present and future. His meditation on the "last bit of Indian rock" (later known as the Vivekananda Rock Memorial) continued for three days from 25 to 27 December. Swami Vivekananda contemplated on India since Vedic age during his 3 days meditation in Kanya Kumari. The past glory of India brought tears in his eyes. In Bodhgaya, he had contemplated on the Buddhist age of India and its glory was so mesmerizing that he was overwhelmed while being in meditation.

Here he had a "vision of one India" and came up with a solution in the form of resolution, which is popularly known as the "Kanyakumari resolve of 1892"..." The purpose of the 'resolve' was also to organize sannyasins for social service.

In a letter written to Swami Ramakrishnananda on 19 March 1894, Vivekananda recalled:

My brother, in view of all this, especially of poverty and ignorance, I had no sleep. At Cape Comorin sitting in Mother Kumari's temple, sitting on the last bit of Indian rock—I hit upon a plan: We are so many Sannyasins wandering about, and teaching the people metaphysics—it is all madness. Did not our Gurudeva use to say, "An empty stomach is no good for religion"? That those poor people are leading the life of brutes is simply due to ignorance. We have for all ages been sucking their blood and trampling them underfoot.

At Kanyakumari, he decided to dedicate his life to the welfare and uplifting of the common masses of India.

== Sankalp Divas ==
The date 24 December, when Vivekananda took the resolution at Kanyakumari, is celebrated as Sankalp Divas (the resolve day, resolution day).
