= Vivekananda Rock Memorial =

Monument in Kanyakumari, India

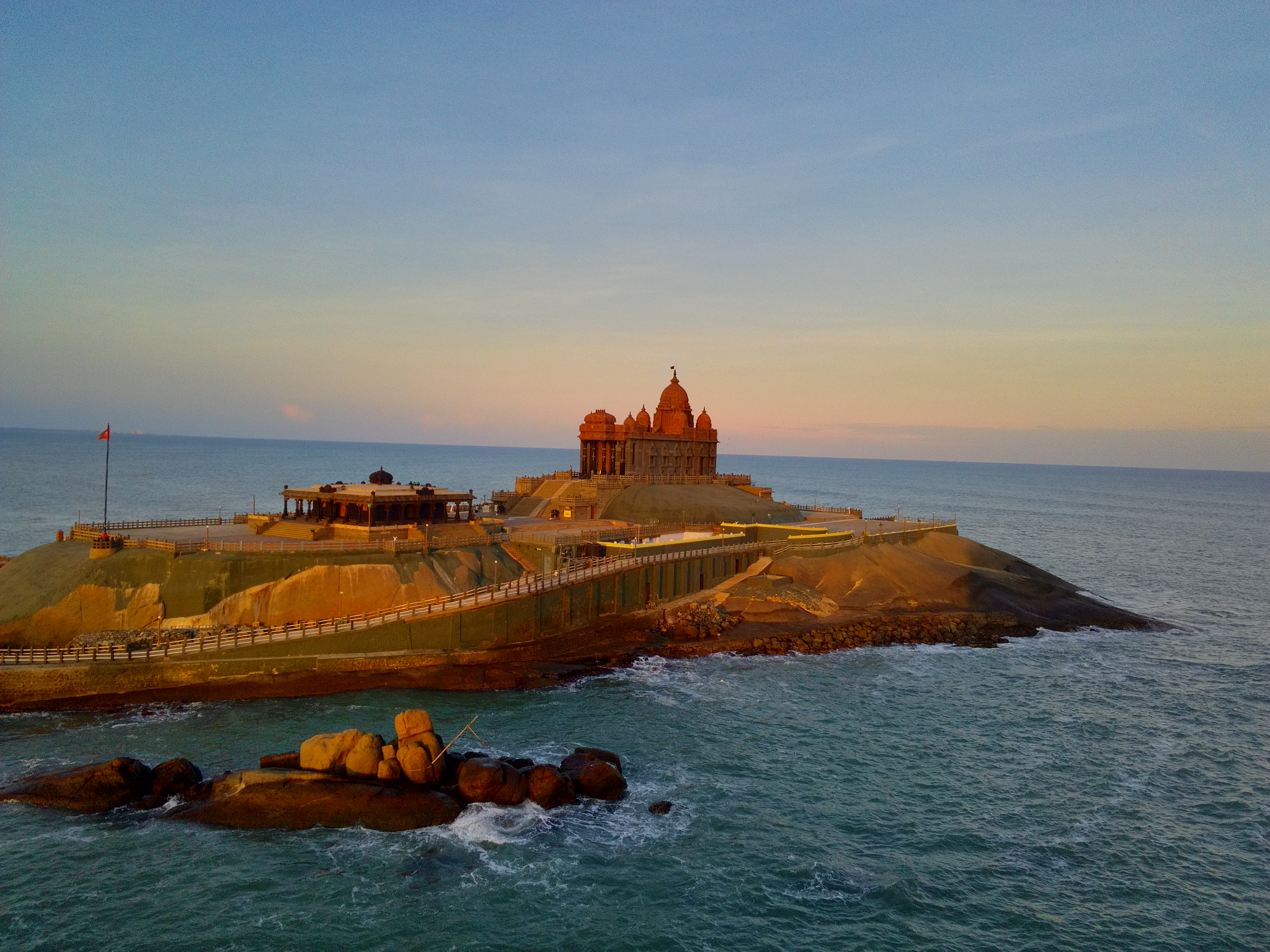

- Location within Tamil Nadu Location within India
- 8°04′41.1″N 77°33′19.7″E
- Location: Kanyakumari, Tamil Nadu, India

History
- Built: 2 September 1970; 56 years ago

Site notes
- Elevation: 16.764 metres (55.00 ft)
- Architect: Eknath Ranade
- Architectural styles: Indian rock-cut and Cathedral
- Website: www.vrmvk.org

Vivekananda Rock Memorial is a monument and popular tourist attraction in Kanyakumari, India's southernmost tip. The memorial stands on one of the two rocks located about 500 meters off mainland of Vavathurai, Tamil Nadu. It was built in 1970 in honour of Swami Vivekananda, who is said to have attained enlightenment on the rock.

According to legends, it was on this rock that Goddess Kanyakumari (Parvathi) performed tapas in devotion of Lord Shiva. A meditation hall known as Dhyana Mandapam is also attached to the memorial for visitors to meditate. The design of the mandapa incorporates different styles of temple architecture from all over India. The rocks are surrounded by the Laccadive Sea where the three oceans Bay of Bengal, the Indian Ocean and the Arabian Sea meet. The memorial consists of two main structures, the Vivekananda Mandapam and the Shripada Mandapam.

== Legend ==
It is believed that Swami Vivekananda, swam across the seashore in Kanyakumari, Tamil Nadu to reach the rock mid-sea and he meditated for three days and nights on the rock until he is said to have attained enlightenment there a basis for Kanyakumari resolve of 1892. There are several statements in many books that Swami Vivekananda swam and got enlightenment at this place. It is also believed that some of these stories might be false by a minor majority.

== Initiation ==
In January 1962, on the occasion of Swami Vivekananda's birth centenary, a group of people formed the Kanyakumari Committee, whose objective was to put up a memorial on the rock and a pedestrian bridge leading to the rock. Almost simultaneously, the Ramakrishna Mission in Madras began planning this memorial.

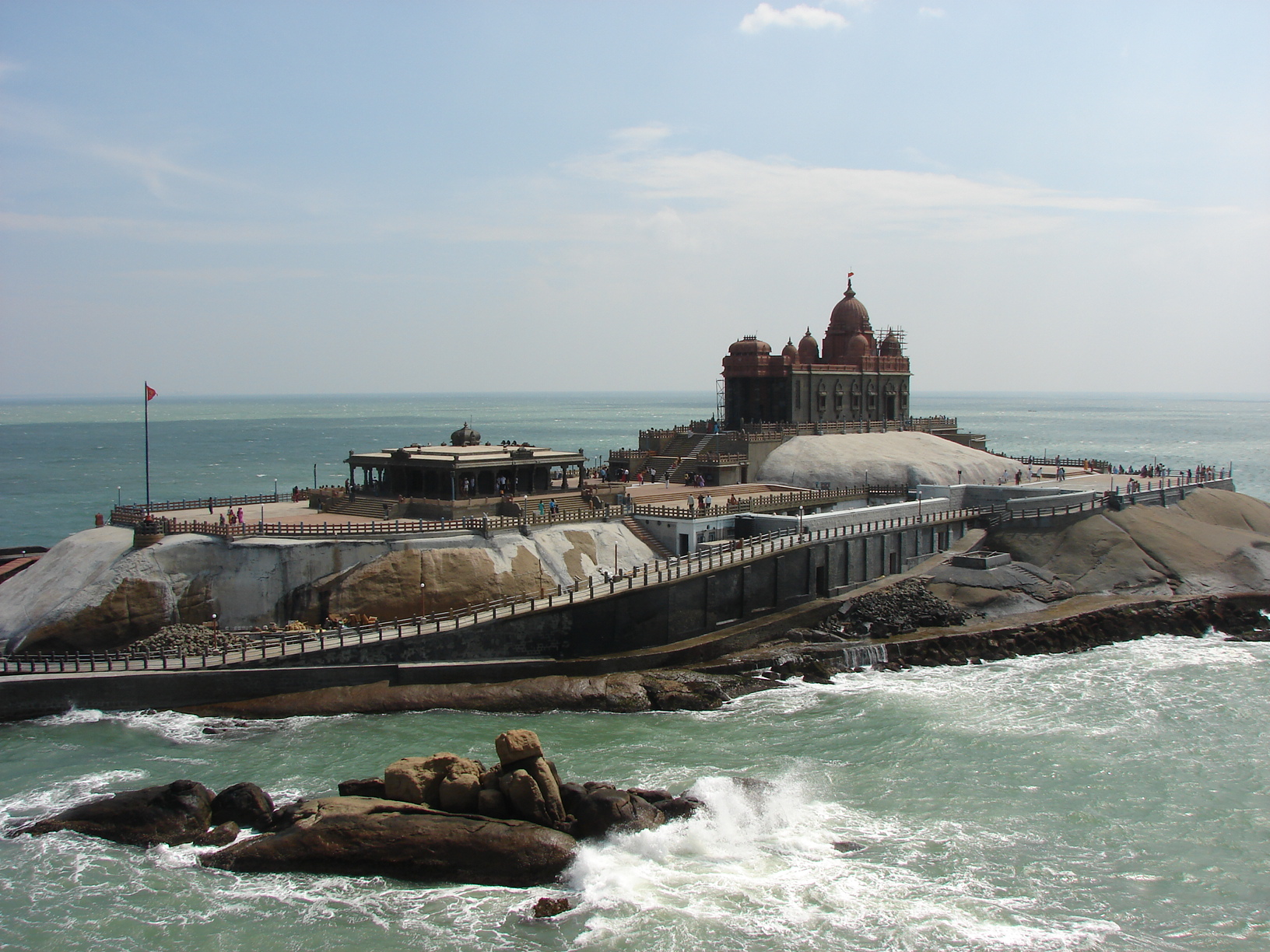
Vivekananda Rock Memorial, Kanyakumari

However, this news was not taken in good taste by a sizable population of the local Catholic fishermen. They already had a big Cross on the rock, visible from the shore.Local Fishermen called it as 'Kurusu Paarai' which translates to 'The rock of cross'. They used to pray at the rock before going into the sea, and also used it as a place to dry their nets.

These tensions led to protests by the Hindu population, who said the rock was a place of worship for Hindus. A judicial probe ordered by the Madras (now Chennai) government stated in unequivocal terms that the rock was Vivekananda Rock and that the Cross was a trespass. Amid all this acrimony, the Cross was removed secretly in the night. The situation turned volatile, and the rock was declared a prohibited area, with armed guards patrolling it.

The government realized that the rock was turning into an area of dispute, with Hindus claiming it to be the Vivekananda Rock and the Christians claiming that it was St. Xavier's Rock. It decreed that although the rock was Vivekananda Rock, there would be no memorial constructed on it. The then Chief Minister of Tamil Nadu, M. Bhaktavatsalam, said that only a tablet declaring that the rock was associated with Swami Vivekananda could be put up, and nothing else. With government's permission, the tablet was installed on the rock on 17 January 1963.

== Role of Eknath Ranade ==
The first step Eknath Ranade took on being asked to take charge of the Rock Memorial work was to ascertain that this effort had the full support of the Ramakrishna Math and Mission. He was made the Organising Secretary of the Vivekananda Rock Memorial Committee, so that he was officially in charge of the Rock Memorial mission.

The immediate obstacles were Bhaktavatsalam's stand that he would not allow the memorial to come up as Humayun Kabir, the Union Minister for Cultural Affairs, had said that the natural beauty of the Rock would be spoiled.

Kabir's constituency was Kolkata (formerly Calcutta). When Ranade publicised in Kolkata that it was Kabir who was against the creation of a Memorial of one of the greatest sons of Bengal, there was such a hue and cry that Kabir had to do a volte-face. However, to prevail over Bhaktavatsalam, only Prime Minister Jawaharlal Nehru's support would do.

To that end, on Lal Bahadur Shastri's advice, Ranade camped in Delhi. In three days, he collected the signatures of 323 Members of Parliament in a show of all-round support for the Vivekananda Rock Memorial, which was presented to the Prime Minister. Bhaktavatsalam had no option now but to allow the construction of the Rock Memorial.

Bhaktavatsalam had given permission only for a small 15 × 15-foot shrine. Knowing his reverence for the Paramacharya of Kanchi Kamakoti Peetham, Ranade approached the latter for suggesting the design of the Rock Memorial. Bhaktavatsalam unhesitatingly agreed to the larger design (130 feet and 1 1/2 inches × 56 feet) approved by the Paramacharya.

Once all the political hurdles were removed, construction was underway. Ranade was in the forefront facing all the challenges that came his way: to establish scientifically that the Rock was structurally sound and could support such a huge structure on it; the logistics of quarrying and transporting large blocks of stone from great distances, and from the shore to the Rock; provision of water and power supplies; the growing demand for skilled artisans, craftsmen, and labor; building of jetty platforms on the rock and the shore (the pedestrian footbridge idea to the Rock was dropped); the de-silting around the jetty platform areas to enable bigger crafts to approach the shore, and so on.

The biggest and ever-present challenge, however, was that of financing the whole operation. Ranade's belief in the success of the Rock Memorial mission was so strong, that he never slowed the pace of work when funds were in paucity. He brushed aside the discouragement of others whose belief was not as strong and started a fund-campaign.

Ranade believed that as the Vivekananda Rock Memorial was a national monument; every Indian should be invited to contribute to its construction. He approached almost every state government and asked for their contribution, making a special effort to go to the north-eastern states of Nagaland and Arunachal Pradesh so that they could also feel a part of the national endeavor. The bulk of the contributions came from the general public. Ranade launched the campaign of one-rupee folders throughout the nation, which was used to mobilize the donations of the common man, starting from as tiny an amount as a rupee.

The Vivekananda Rock Memorial was inaugurated in 1970 and dedicated to the nation.

== The Living Memorial ==
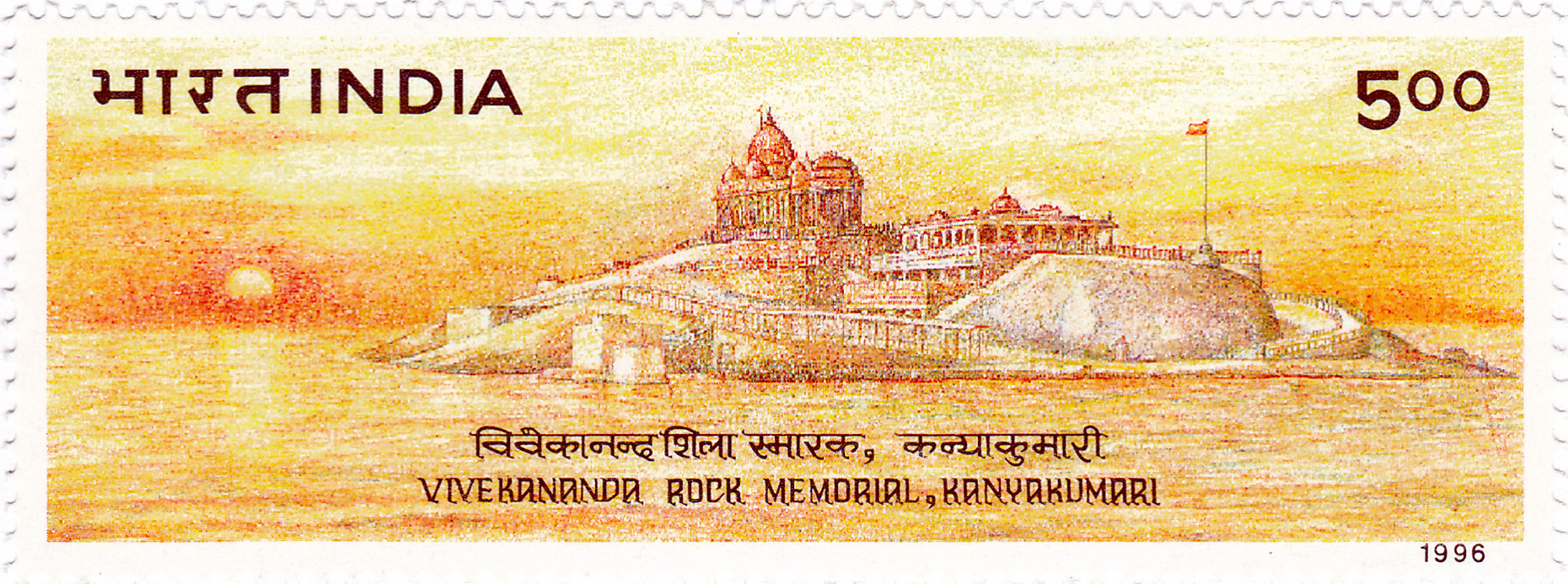
Vivekananda Rock Memorial on a 1996 stamp of India

The establishment of Vivekananda Kendra—the Living Memorial alongside the stone structure of the Rock Memorial—was mentioned in 1964. After the groundwork of about nine years, Vivekananda Kendra was officially founded on 7 January 1972 (the 108th birth anniversary of Swami Vivekananda by the Hindu calendar). On that day, as the sun rose, a saffron flag with Om inscribed on it was unfurled on the Vivekananda Rock Memorial to celebrate the founding of the Vivekananda Kendra: a spiritually oriented service mission of a non-monastic order.

The tradition of penance was to be continued by young men and women coming as Karyakartas of Vivekananda Kendra to spread the following message of Swami Vivekananda:

A hundred thousand men and women, fired with the zeal of holiness, fortified with eternal faith in the Lord, and nerved to lion's courage by their sympathy for the poor and the fallen and the downtrodden, will go over the length and breadth of the land, preaching the gospel of salvation, the gospel of help, the gospel of social raising up, the gospel of equality.

The twin objectives of Vivekananda Kendra are man-making and nation-building. Ranade decided that Vivekananda Kendra was to be a cadre-based organization. Young men and women whose hearts long to serve the nation would be provided the opportunity and the right platform to serve God in man.

When Swami Vivekananda Rock Memorial was blueprinted, it was modeled by E. Thanumalayan, a student of the S. T. Hindu College, Nagercoil, Tamil Nadu. He modeled it with paraffin wax. The Memorial is the fusion of West Bengal and Tamil Nadu architecture and the design of Ramakrishna Math, Belur, West Bengal. He was deeply appreciated by Bhaktavatsalam for its aesthetic quality.

== Vivekananda Mandapam ==
This mandapa, which is erected in honor of Vivekananda, consists of the following sections:

- Dhyana Mandapam is the meditation Hall with six adjacent rooms.
- Sabha Mandapam is the Assembly Hall comprising Pratima Mandapam (statue section), two rooms, a corridor, and an open prakaram (outer courtyard) round the Sabha Mandapam.
- Mukha Mandapam

== Shripada Mandapam ==
This square hall consists of the following structures.

- Garbha Graham
- Inner Prakaram
- Outer Prakaram
- Outer Platform

Both the Mandapams are so designed that the vision of Vivekananda in the statue would be seen direct towards the Shripadam. There is also Sri Padaparai Mandapam which is a shrine erected at the spot where the footprint of the Virgin Goddess is seen on the rock.

The statue of Swami Vivekananda was sculpted by Narayan Sonavadekar, a sculptor and a professor at the J. J. School of Arts, Mumbai.

== How to reach mid-sea Memorial ==
State Govt's Poompuhar Shipping Corporation Limited is running boat to the mid-sea National Memorial - Vivekananda Rock Memorial one can get Darshanam coupon online through https://darshanam.vrmvk.org

== Gallery ==
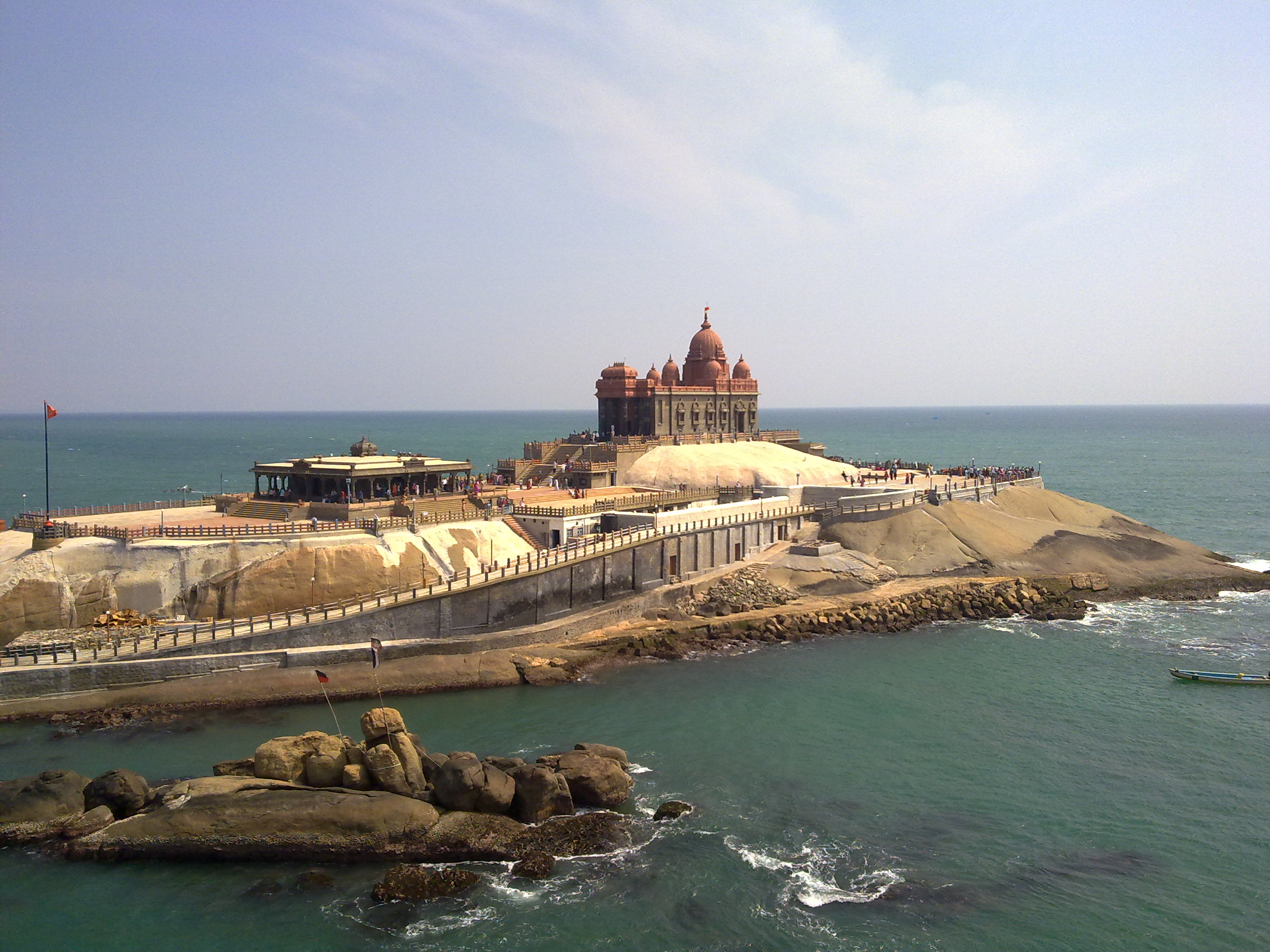
Vivekananda Rock Memorial from afar

Looking up from the base of the Vivekananda Rock Memorial

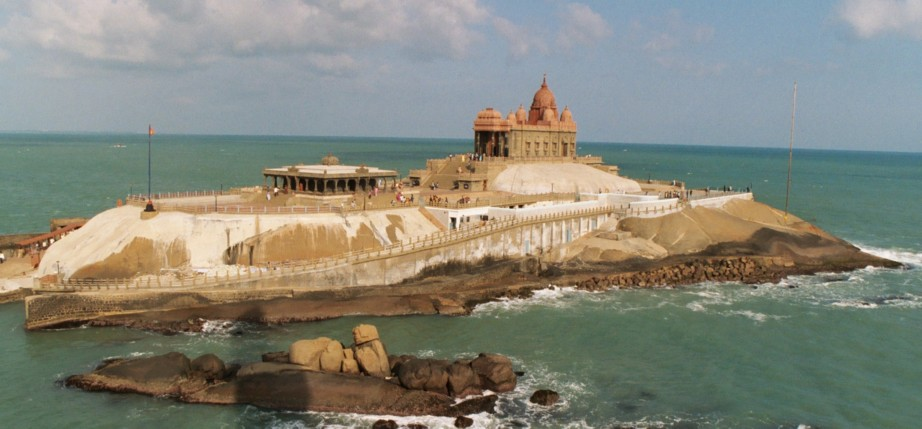
Vivekananda Rock

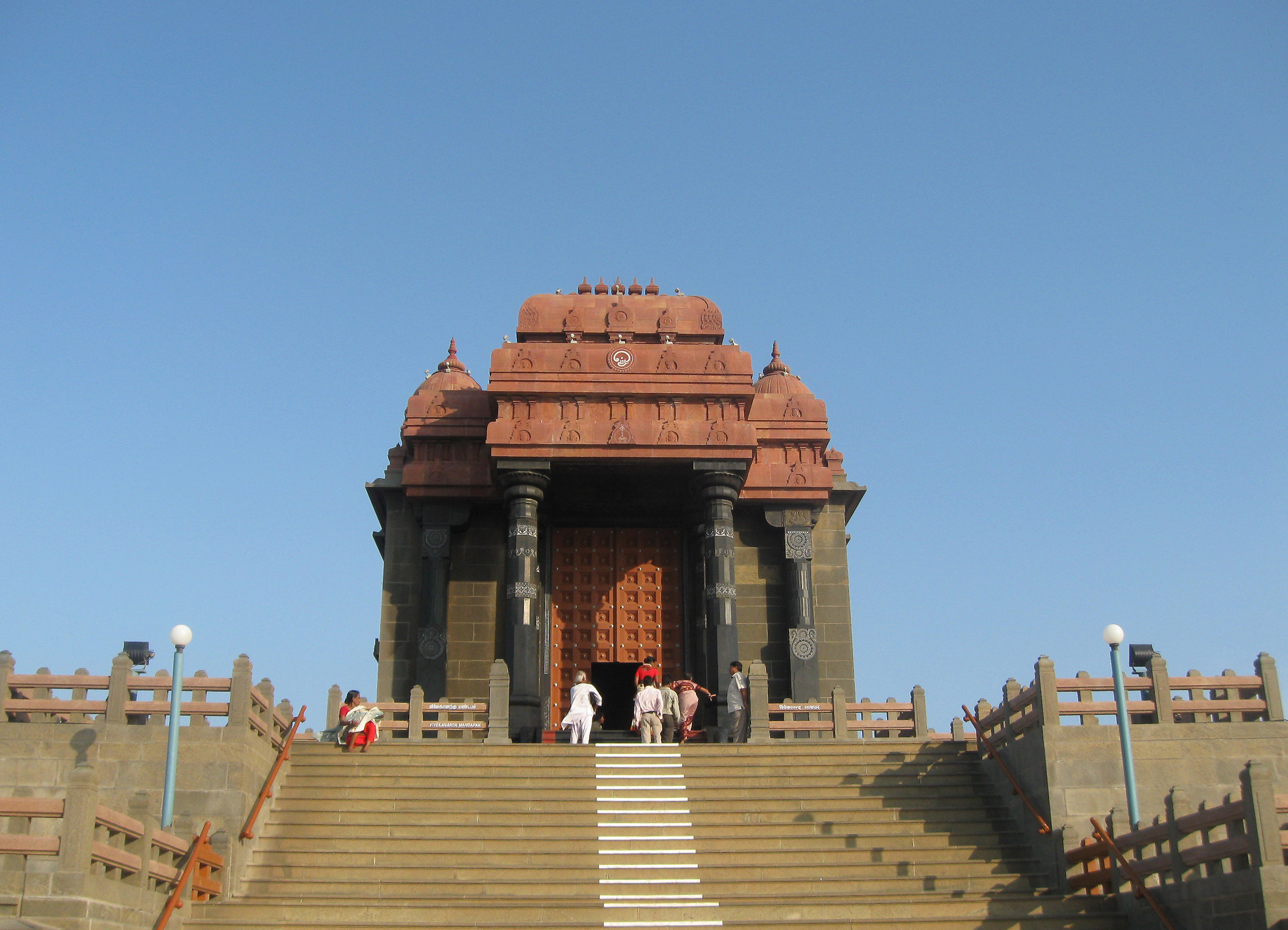
View of the entrance

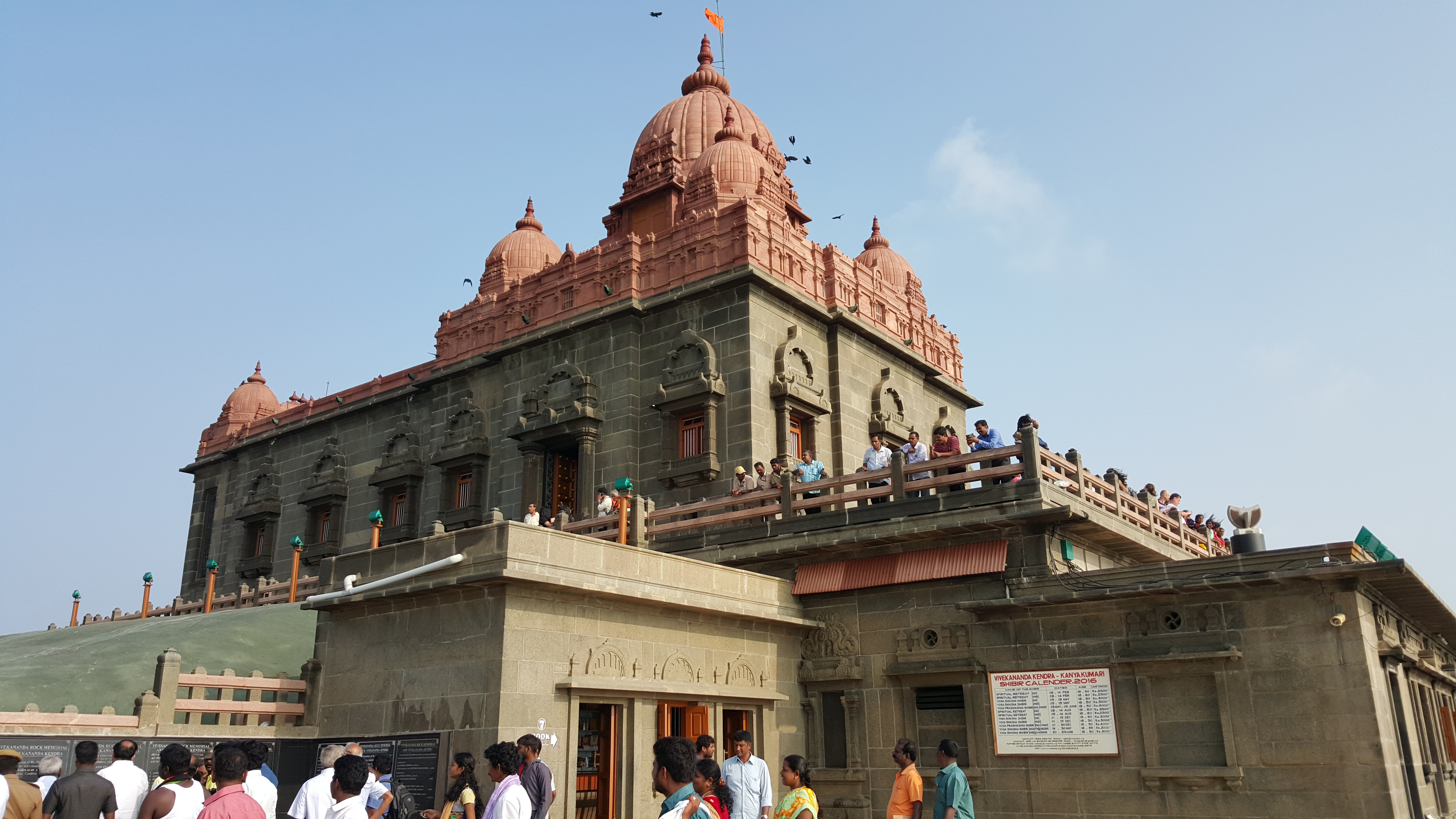
Vivekananda Rock Memorial in 2016

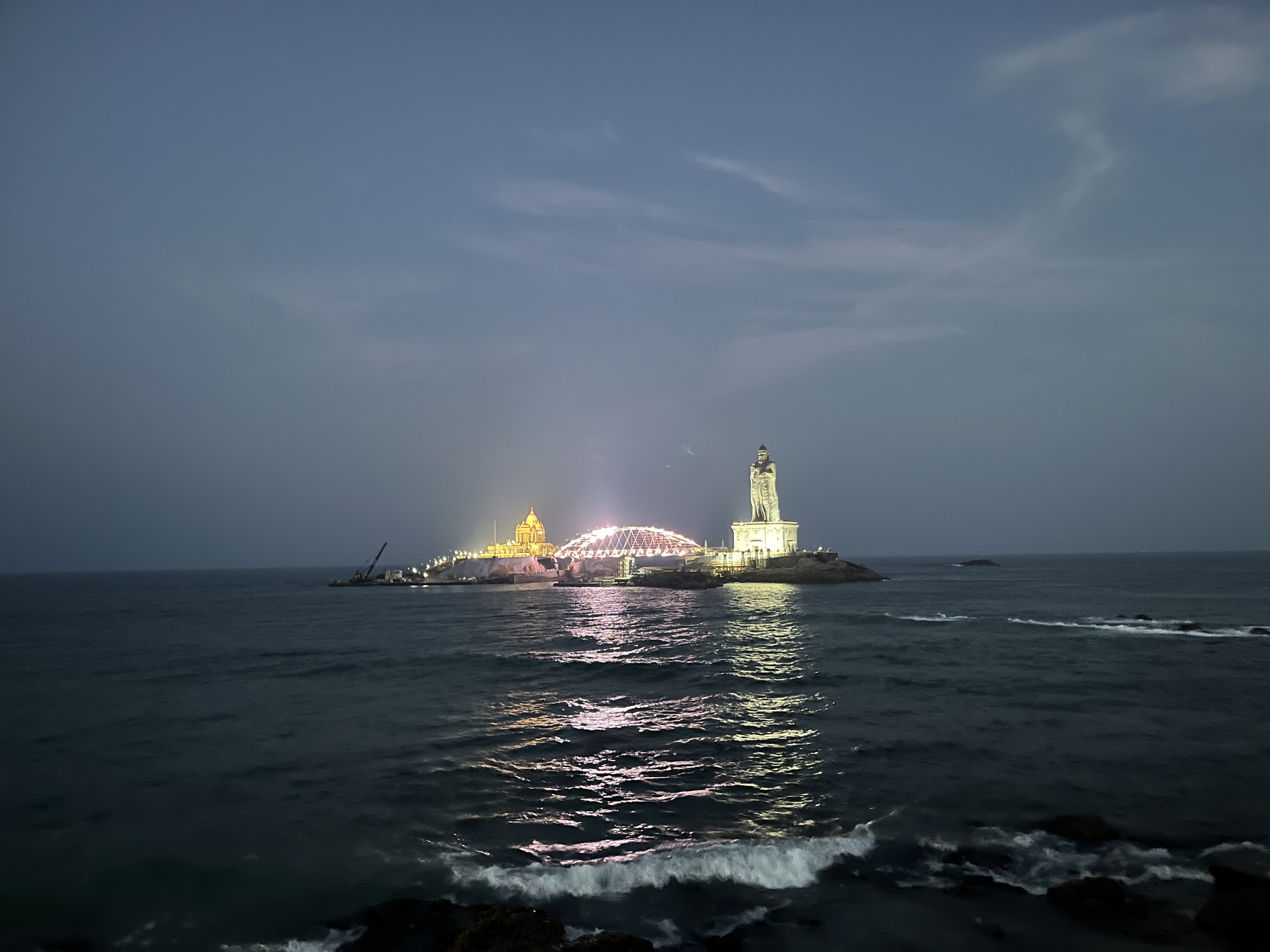
Night view of glass bridge connecting Vivekananda rock memorial with Thiruvalluvar statue

== See also ==
- Thiruvalluvar Statue
- Vivekananda Kendra
- Kanyakumari resolve of 1892
