= Vivekananda Kendra =

Hindu spiritual organization

- Formation: 7 January 1972 (54 years ago)
- Founder: Eknath Ranade
- Legal status: Active
- Headquarters: Kanyakumari, Tamil Nadu, India
- Region served: India
- President: A. Balakrishnan
- Website: vrmvk.org

Vivekananda Kendra is a spiritually-oriented service mission founded in 1972, based near the Vivekananda Rock Memorial in Kanyakumari (Tamil Nadu, India).

It claims to focus on "man making and nation building" through various activities, including education, women's empowerment, rural development, promoting Indian culture, as well as youth empowerment, and free yoga classes to promote healthy mind and body.

== Established in 1972 ==
Founded by Eknath Ranade as a "living memorial" to Swami Vivekananda's vision, following the construction of the Vivekananda Rock Memorial in Kanyakumari.

== Recognition ==
Vivekananda Kendra received the Gandhi Peace Prize for 2015 for its contribution to rural development, education, and development of natural resources.

== Educational initiatives ==
Runs Vivekananda Kendra Vidyalaya (VKV) is a network of 84 schools across India, including Arunachal Pradesh, Assam, Tamil Nadu, and the Andaman Islands, claiming to focus on holistic education inspired by Swami Vivekananda's teachings.

== Gallery ==
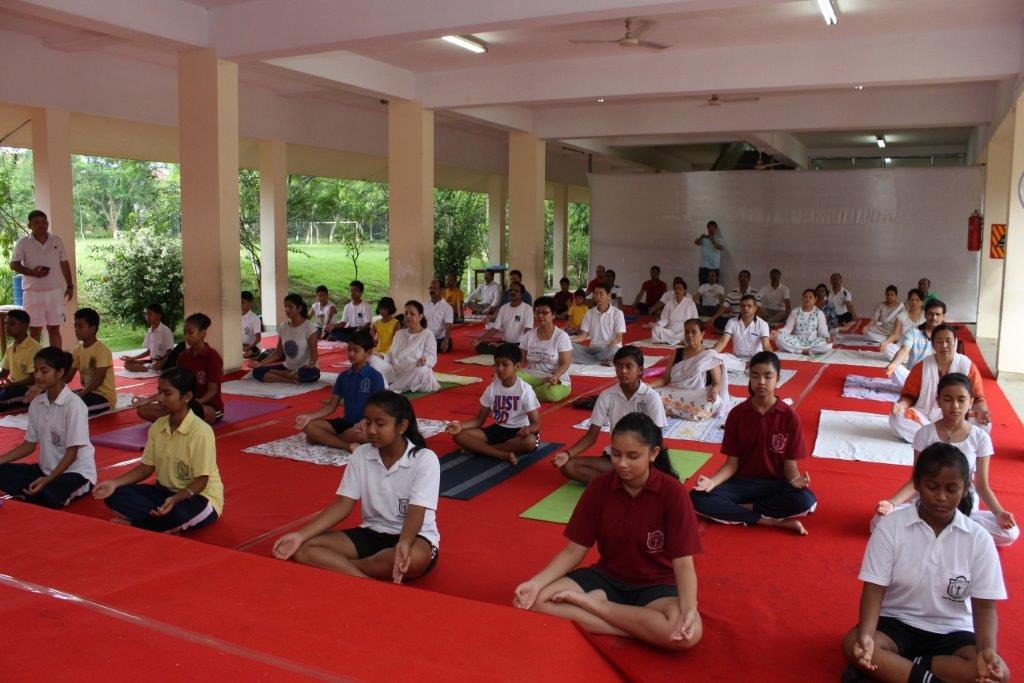
Vivekananda Kendra Students doing meditation during learning Yoga Class

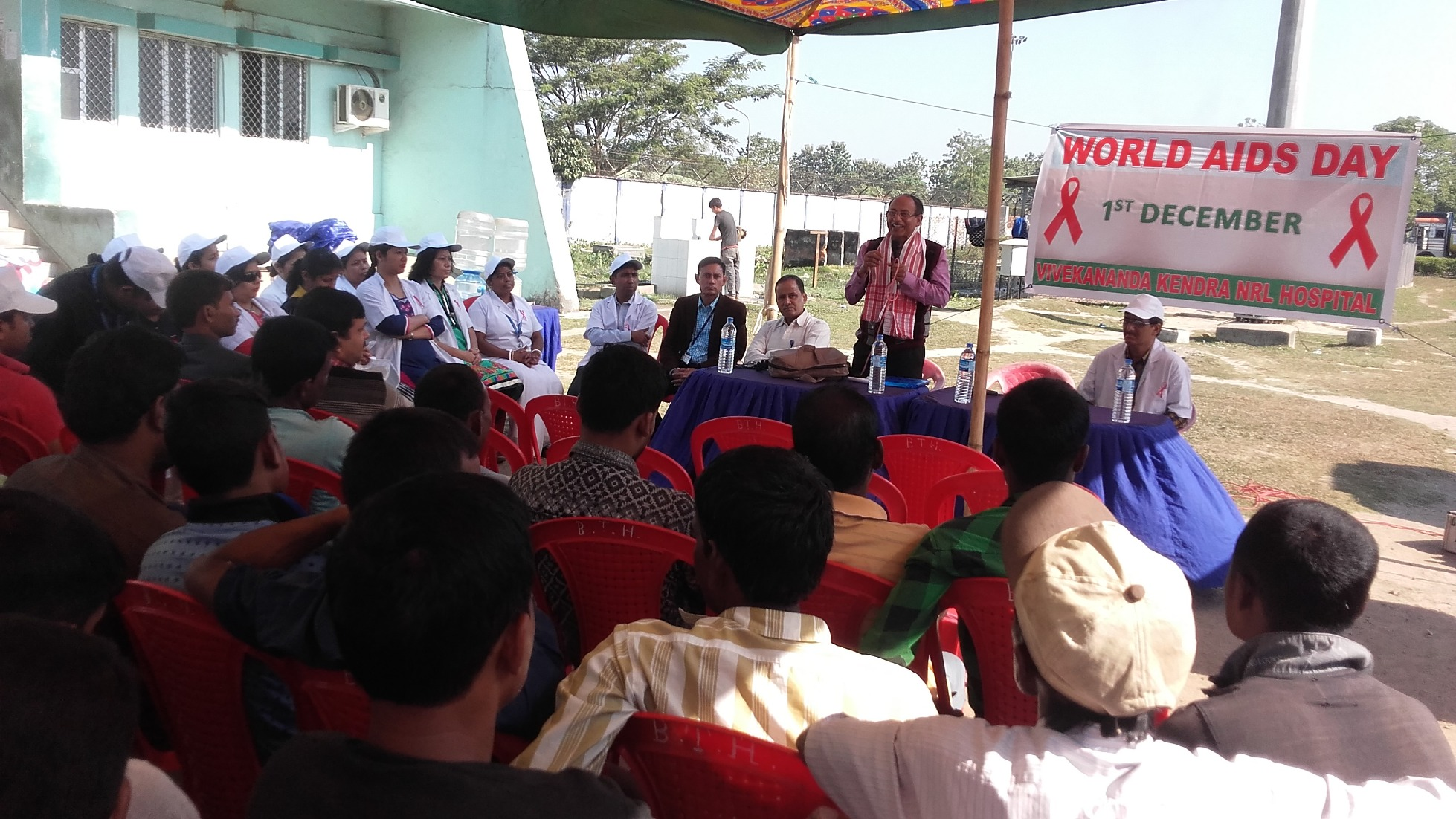
Vivekananda Kendra Community Hospital

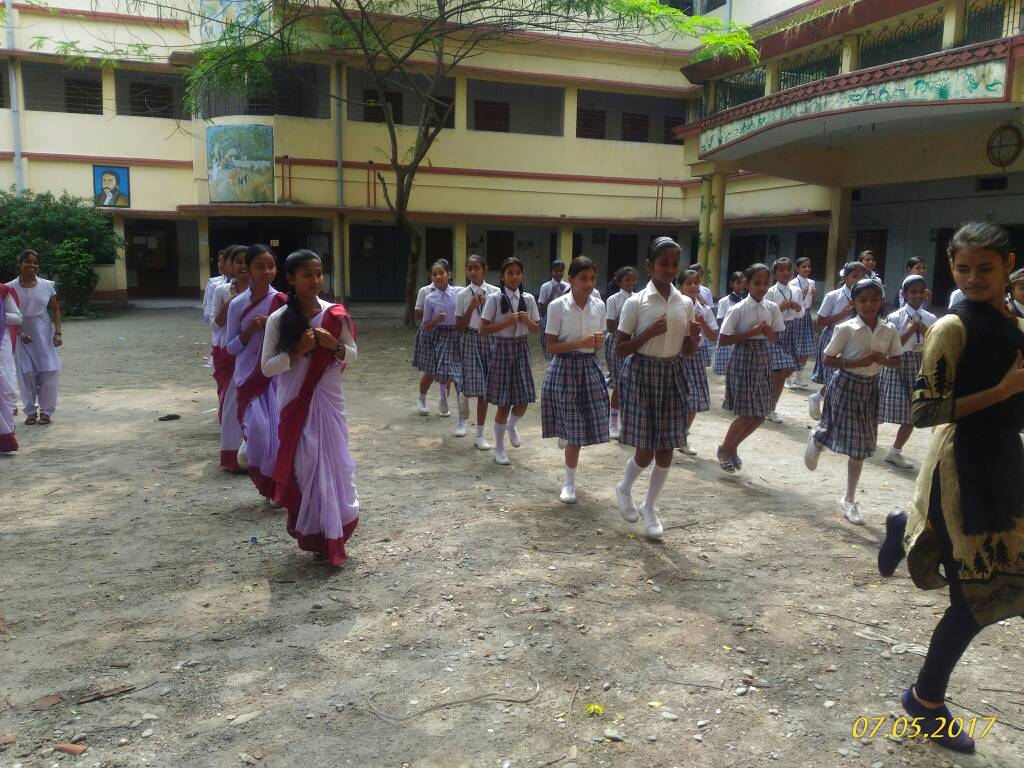
Vivekananda Kendra Students Doing Yoga Exercises

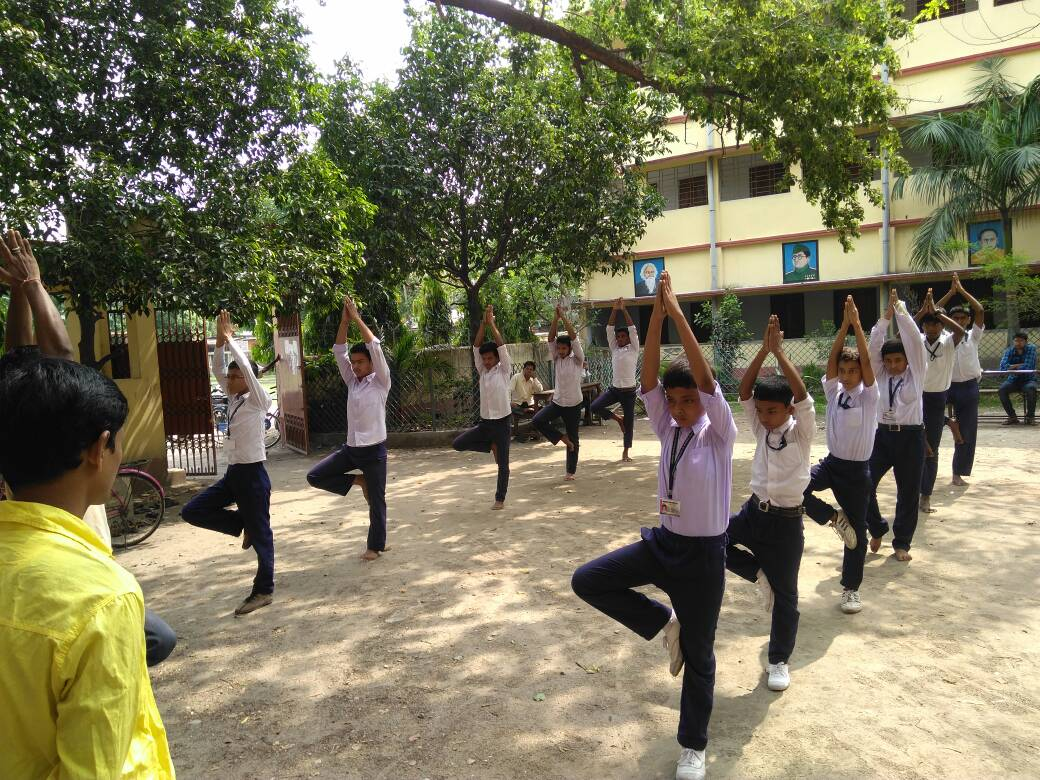
Vivekananda Kendra Students Practicing Yoga Exercise – To Improve Physical and Mental Stability

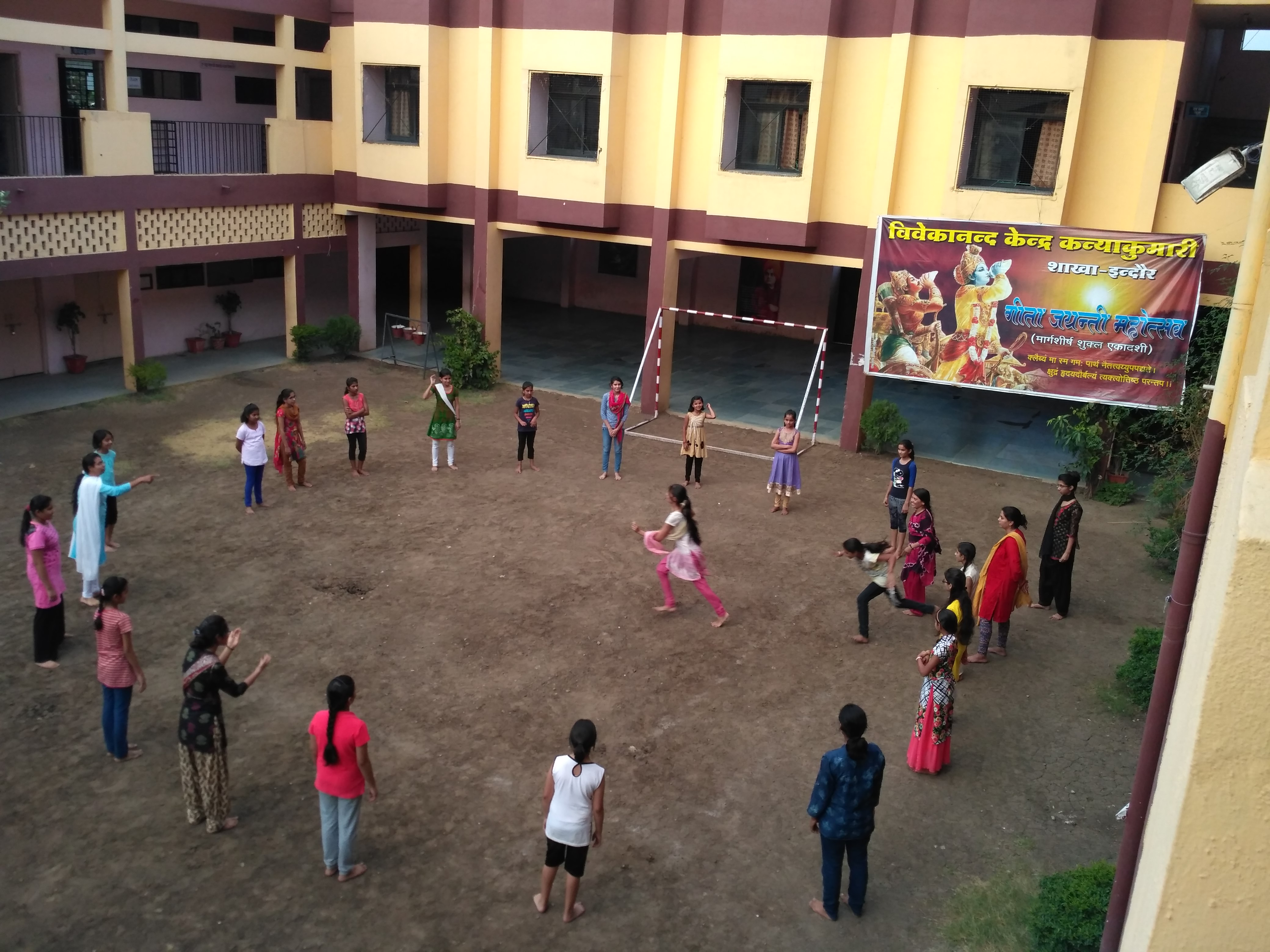
Vivekananda Kendra Students Playing Games

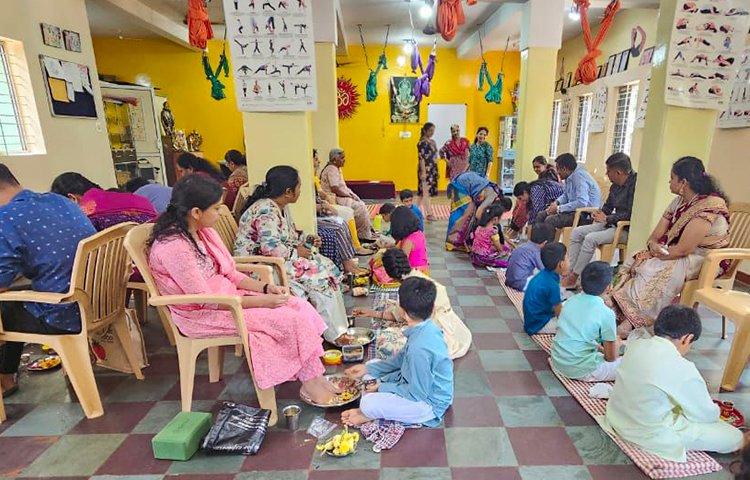
Vivekananda Kendra Students Worshiping Parents – Parents Worship Hindu Practice

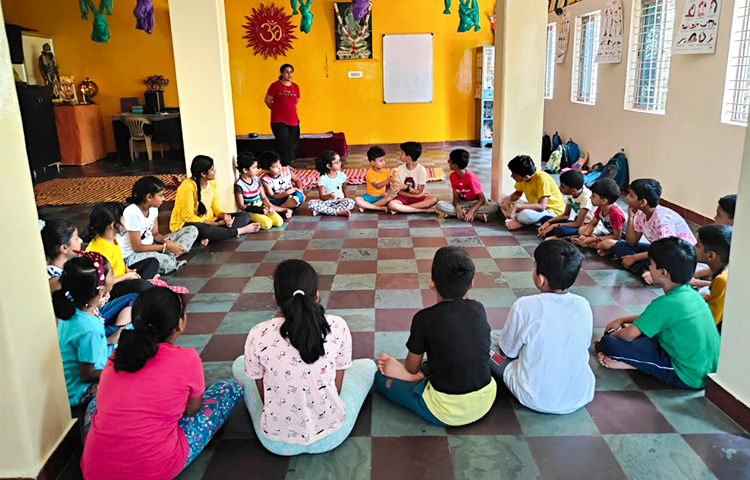
Vivekananda Kendra Students Playing Mind Games – Sanskar Varg Classes

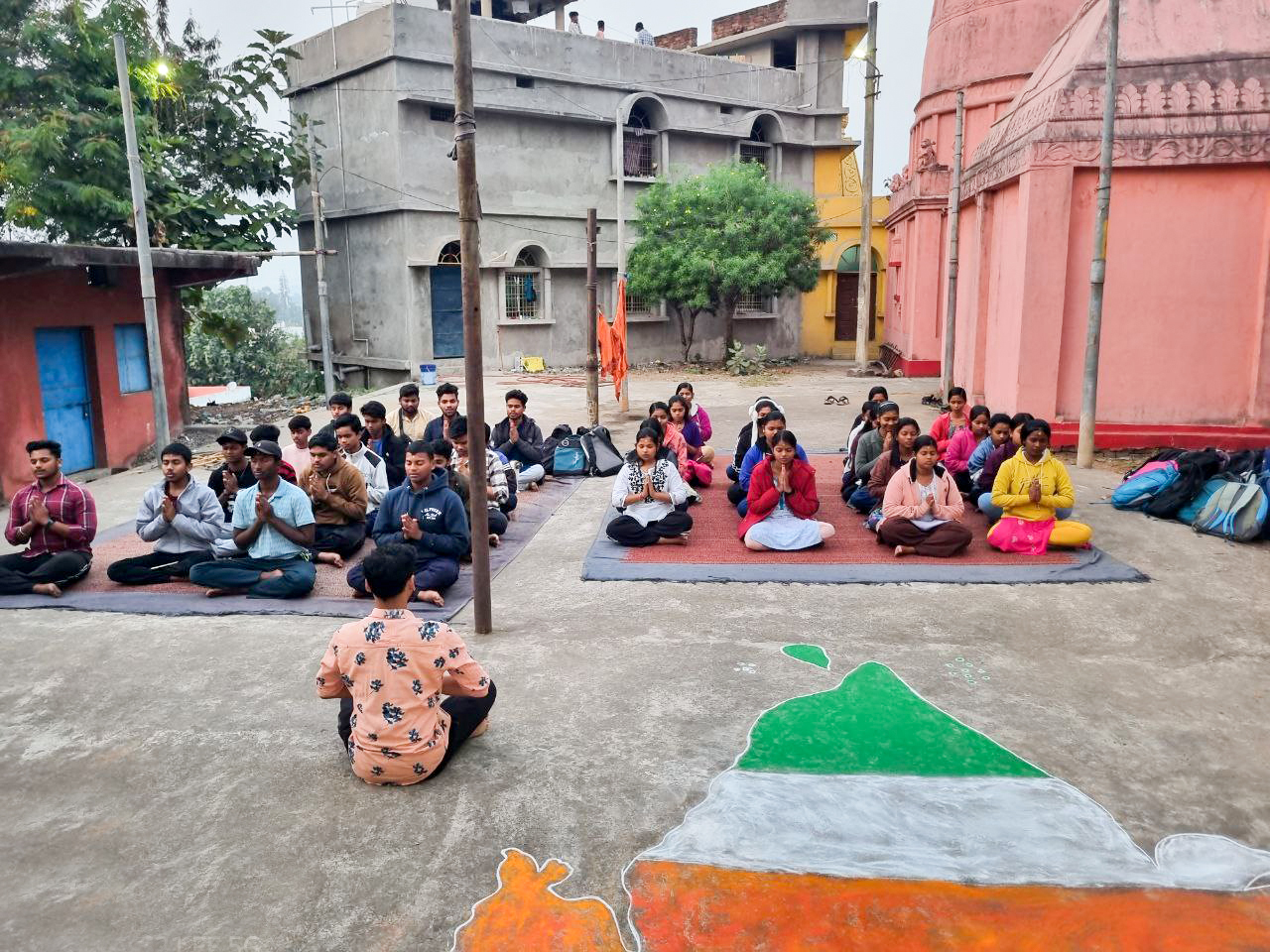
Vivekananda Kendra Students Praying for World Peace and Prosperity

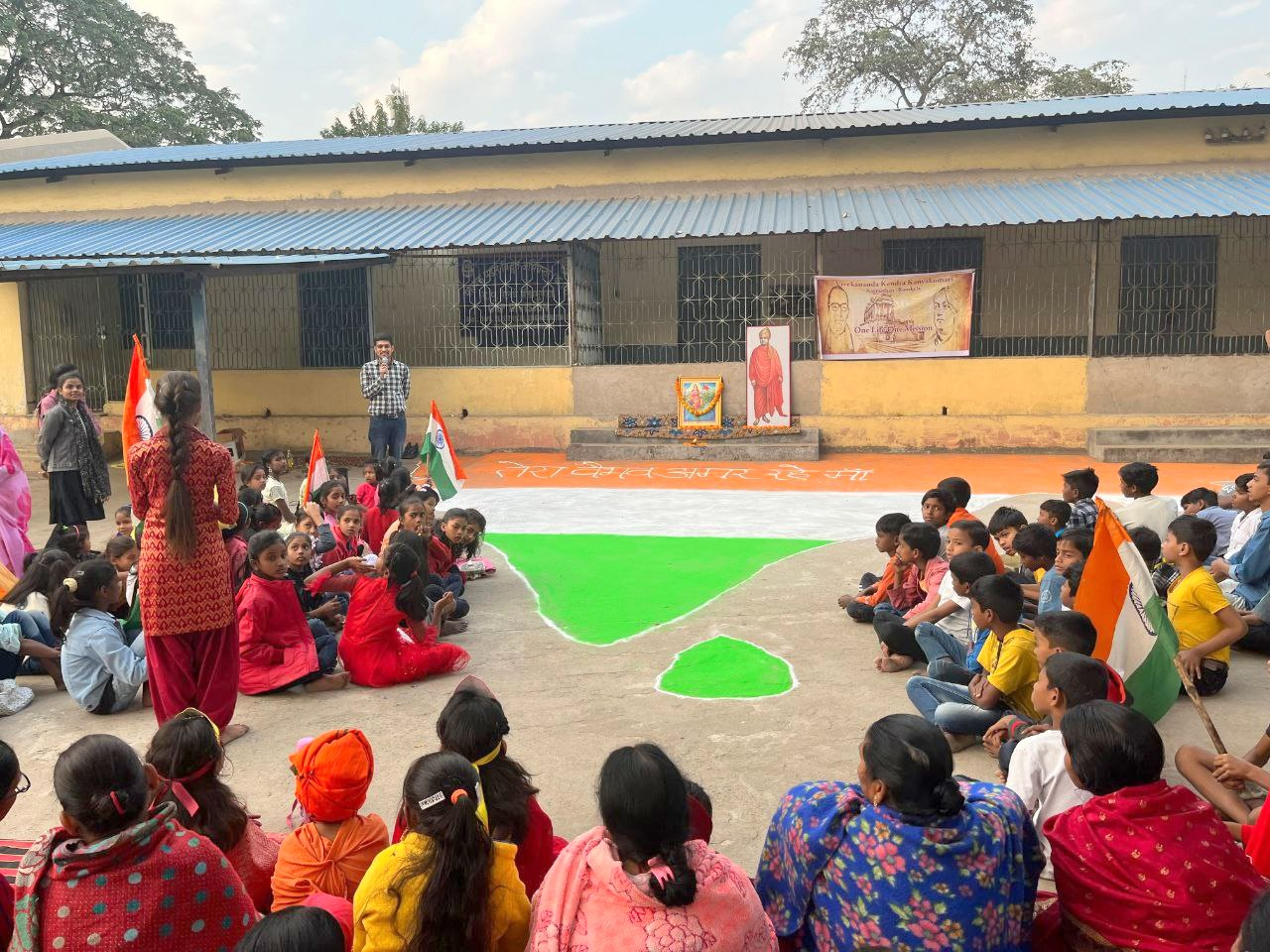
Vivekananda Kendra Students Performing Bharat Mata Pooja

== See also ==
- Eknath Ranade
