= Eknath Ranade =

Indian social activist and leader of the RSS (1914–1982)

Eknath Ramakrishna Ranade
- Born: 19 November 1914; Timtala, Central Provinces and Berar, British India
- Died: 22 August 1982 (aged 67); Madras, Tamil Nadu, India
- Education: Dr. Hari Singh Gour University
- Known for: Indian Social and Spiritual Reformer

Eknath Ramakrishna Ranade (Marathi: [ekᵊn̪at̪ʰ ɾɑmɐkɾuʂɳə ɾäɳäɖe]; 19 November 1914 – 22 August 1982) was an Indian social activist. He joined the Rashtriya Swayamsevak Sangh (RSS) while still in school and served as a general secretary from 1956 to 1962.

Ranade was deeply influenced by the teachings of Swami Vivekananda and compiled a book of his writings. He played a significant role in the construction of the Vivekananda Rock Memorial and the Vivekananda Kendra in Kanyakumari, Tamil Nadu.

== Early life and education ==
Ranade was born on 19 November 1914 in Timtala, located in the Amravati district, in the once-British Indian state of Maharashtra. In 1920, his family relocated to Nagpur, and he completed his early education at Pradanavispura School.

In 1932, he completed his education at the New English High School in Nagpur.

Subsequently, he earned a Master of Arts degree with honours in Philosophy, followed by a Bachelor of Laws from Sagar University in Jabalpur in 1945.

== Role in Rashtriya Swayamsevak Sangh ==
Ranade held key roles within the Rashtriya Swayamsevak Sangh (RSS), a Hindu nationalist volunteer organization, where he served as an activist, ideologue, and leader.

During his school years, Ranade was deeply influenced by K. B. Hedgewar, the founding figure of the Rashtriya Swayamsevak Sangh. Ranade joined the organization as a Swayamsevak (volunteer) in 1926. After working for the RSS in Nagpur, Ranade was appointed as a Pranth Pracharak (provincial organizer) in Mahakoshal, Madhya Pradesh in 1938.

Following the assassination of Mahatma Gandhi and the subsequent ban of the RSS, Ranade went underground to lead organizational efforts, earning the moniker of the Underground Sarsanghchalak. At the same time, the RSS launched a satyagraha under the leadership of M. S. Golwalkar to lift the ban. After Golwalkar's arrest, Ranade led the satyagraha and participated in secret negotiations with Sardar Patel, the nation's Home Minister.

As a condition for rescinding the RSS ban, Patel insisted that the RSS should be organized with a written constitution.

Ranade formed a constitution in association with fellow RSS members Prabhakar Balwant Dani and Madhukar Dattatraya Deoras, but it did not meet government expectations. As a result, it was redrafted to include clauses such as allegiance to the Indian Constitution and Flag, shunning violence, only enrolling minors in the movement with the permission of their parents, and setting procedures for the election of Sarsanghchalak, among other things. The government accepted the re-drafted constitution in June 1949. The ban imposed on the RSS was revoked on 11 July 1949.

In 1950, he worked as a Kshetra Pracharak for Poorvanchal Kshetra, comprising Bengal, Odisha, and Assam. In Calcutta, he established a Vastuhara Sahayata Samiti (lit. 'Committee to Help the Dispossessed') to aid refugees from Pakistan following the Partition of India. In 1953, Ranade became the Akhil Bharatiya Prachar Pramukh (lit. 'All-India Propagation Chief'). From 1956 to 1962, Ranade served as RSS's general secretary. During this period, he tried to refocus the RSS on character-building rather than pursuing a more activist stance in coordination with affiliated organizations. In 1962, he was selected as All-India Baudhik Pramukh of the RSS.

During the 1963–72 period, Ranade served as the organizing secretary for the construction of the Vivekananda Rock Memorial.

In 1972, Ranade founded the Vivekananda Kendra, centered at Kanyakumari, as a Hindu spiritual organisation based on the principles of "Renunciation and Service".

The Kendra is a "lay service organization" without a guru or propagation of a "guru culture", though it was influenced by the teachings of Vivekananda. It has 206 branches in various parts of India. He did not endorse the status of an "avatar-hood" (god incarnate) to Kendra. He neither promoted himself nor Vivekananda to the status of worship at the center but promoted the use of Omkara as its guiding principle. He believed that by adopting Omkara as guru, all gurus in India would be honoured. Ranade became the President of the Vivekananda Kendra in 1978 after serving as its general secretary.

== Vivekananda Memorial and Kendra ==
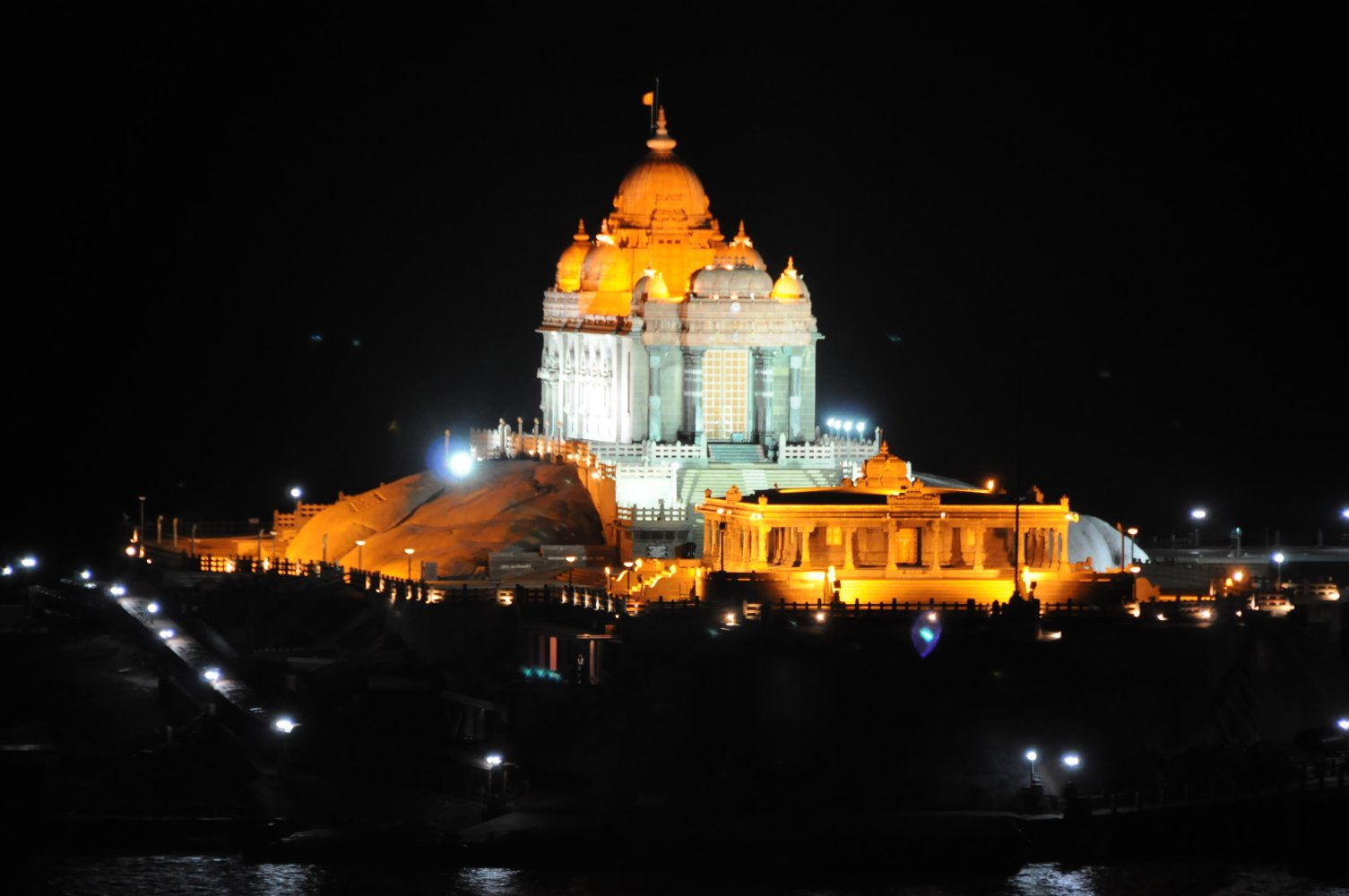
Ranade was the organising secretary of Vivekananda Rock Memorial committee.

The teachings of Vivekananda deeply influenced Ranade. In 1963, during the centenary year of his birth, he published a selection of Vivekananda's writing under the title Rousing Call to Hindu Nation as a personal tribute. The same year, Ranade conceived the idea of building a monument in honour of Vivekananda at the mid-sea rock location near Kanyakumari, where Vivekananda had meditated for three days in December 1892.

After receiving positive responses to the idea from RSS chief M. S. Golwalkar and others, Ranade established the Vivekananda Rock Memorial Organising Committee and became its organizing secretary. Various committee branches were established across the country (with Bharatiya Janata Party leader L. K. Advani serving as the organizing secretary of the Delhi branch) to build support and later raise funds for the memorial.

After the proposal was initially declined by Humayun Kabir, then serving as Minister of Education and Culture, Ranade gained support from over 300 members of the Indian Parliament. His efforts ultimately led to the project's approval from then Prime Minister Indira Gandhi. Ranade also succeeded in securing the endorsements for the project from various parts of the political and spiritual community, including sections traditionally in opposition to the RSS.

After the project was approved, Ranade led volunteers to raise funds for the construction of the Vivekananda Rock Memorial from donors across the country and encouraged every citizen to donate at least one rupee, as part of the Jan-Bhagidaari (People's Participation) scheme.

== Death and legacy ==
Ranade died due to a heart attack on 22 August 1982 in Madras. He was cremated the following day at Vivekanandapuram in Kanyakumari. Following his death, Organiser magazine honoured him with the title of Karmayogi—a master and devoted follower of Karma Yoga.

That same year, Vivekananda Kendra produced a documentary titled Eknathji: One Life – One Mission, chronicling the life and legacy of Ranade.

== Publications ==
Ranade's notable publications include:

- Swami Vivekananda's Rousing Call to Hindu Nation
- The Sadhana of Service (1985)
- The Story of Vivekananda Rock Memorial
- The Kendra Unfolds.

== See also ==
- Vivekanand Rock Memorial
- Alasinga Perumal
