= Madhukar =

Madhukar is a given name and surname. Notable people with the name include:

== Given name ==
- Madhukar Rao Bhagwat (born 1949 or 1950), Indian activist
- Madhukar Narhar Chandurkar (1926–2004), Indian Judge
- Madhukar Dattatraya Deoras (1915–1996), Leader of the Indian RSS
- Madhukar C. Dhas (born 1949), Indian-American singer, songwriter and performer
- Madhukar Keshav Dhavalikar (1930–2018), Indian historian and archaeologist
- Madhukar Vasudev Dhond (1914–2007), Indian literary and art critic
- Madhukar Dhumal (born 1960), Indian Shehnai player, composer and musician
- Madhukar Dighe (1920–2014), Indian politician
- Madhukar Dattatreya Hatakananglekar (1927–2015), Marathi literary critic
- Madhukar Hiralal Kania (1927–2016), Indian judge
- Madhukar Katre (1927–2009), Indian politician and trade unionist
- Madhukar Keche (1932-1993), Marathi writer
- Madhukar Kukde (fl. 1995), Indian politician
- Madhukar Krishna Naik (1926–2014), Indian scholar of Indian literature in English
- Madhukar Pai (fl. 2008), Indian health academic
- Madhukar Parekh (fl. 1971), Indian entrepreneur
- Madhukar Pichad (fl. 1980), Indian politician, social worker and former cabinet minister
- Madhukar Shamsher Rana (1941–2019), Nepalese economist
- Madhukar Sarpotdar (1936-2010), Indian politician
- Madhukar Sathe (born 1934), Indian cricketer
- Madhukar Toradmal (1932–2017), Marathi actor, writer, professor and translator

== Surname ==
- C. V. Madhukar (born 1968), Indian banker
- Hemant Madhukar (born 1977), Indian film director and writer
- Kamla Mishra Madhukar (fl. 1967–1996), Indian politician
- Reena Madhukar (fl. 2009), Indian actress
