= Sewa International =

Nonprofit organization

- Formation: 1991
- Type: Non-profit organisation
- Purpose: Humanitarian disaster-relief non-profit
- Headquarters: New Delhi, India
- Region served: Worldwide

Sewa International (from Sanskrit sewa, "service") is the name of the network of Hindu-faith based humanitarian and disaster-relief non profit organisations active in roughly twenty countries including the United States, the United Kingdom, India, Canada, Australia, Trinidad and Tobago, and Kenya. The national chapter has disaster relief, rehabilitation and community-development work as their mission.

Few advocacy groups have described Sewa International to have its origins to Sewa Bharati, the domestic volunteer-service wing of Rashtriya Swayamsevak Sangh (RSS). However Sewa International's own U.S. leadership has claimed that the organisation grew out of a small working group of volunteers in Atlanta.

== History ==
In 1989, Sewa Bharati was founded in India by Madhukar Deoras, the third sarsangchalak (chief) of the RSS, to give structure to charitable and social-service activities of RSS and affiliated-organisations' volunteers. In 1993, Sewa International took its shape. However, according to US chapter's own description "the movement" that became Sewa International actually started in the UK in 1991.

In 1997, Sewa International was formally established. In 2003, Sewa International was registered as a 501(c)(3) non profit in the United States, describing itself as a part of the broader movement that originated in India in 1989. Houston has been one of the most active and biggest of the U.S. chapters. Sewa International has carried out relief work for Hurricane Katrina in 2005, Indian Ocean tsunami in 2004, Hurricane Ike in 2008 and flooding in Guyana among others.

As of 2025–26, the organization describes itself as being active in approximately 20 countries with 43 U.S. chapters.

== Programs and Activities ==
Sewa International has been engaged in disaster relief, rehabilitation, community development, healthcare access in India and other international development projects.

In 2001 Sewa International UK chapter raised funds for Gujarat earthquake relief and then transferred them to Sewa Bharati in India for distribution. In the first two weeks of 2017 Hurricane Harvey volunteers logged over 23,100 hours and raised $300,000 towards $1 million goal. Over the course of the next year the organization raised more than $2 million for recovery including a $500,000 award from the American Red Cross and $397,000 grant from the Greater Houston Community Foundation for case management services. In 2025 Texas Hill Country flash floods saw 200+ Sewa volunteers coordinating with Texas Division of Emergency Management and Volunteer Organizations Active in Disaster. The organization says this response led it to commission a dedicated Disaster Response Vehicle as a model for other chapters.

In 2026 Venezuela earthquakes saw Sewa International's Trinidad and Tobago chapter launch a fundraising campaign with local supermarkets chains in July 2026.

=== COVID-19 pandemic response ===
Sewa's U.S. chapter's distributed masks, hot meals, ran helplines and raised over $1million for relief funds. Arun Kankani-then president received a "Love Takes Action" community service award and a $50,000 grant from the New York Life Foundation.

Meanwhile, it launched "Help India Defeat COVID-19". A final self-report in 2021 declared $45 million from 140,000 donors (roughly) which the organization says the platform Benevity ranked among the top 10 charities for employer-matched giving that year. Twitter co-founder Jack Dorsey also contributed $2.5 million to the campaign. The organisation has gotten 100% scores from Charity Navigator- the top nonprofit rating agency- for "financial health" and "accountability and transparency".
