= Bharat Durga Mandir =

Temple dedicated to Bharat Durga

- भारतदुर्गा मंदिर

Religion
- Affiliation: Hinduism
- District: Nagpur
- Deity: Bharat Durga
- Status: Under construction

Location
- Location: Premises of the National Cancer Institute, Nagpur
- State: Maharashtra
- Country: India

Architecture
- Founder: Mohan Bhagwat
- Established: 24 April 2026

Bharat Durga Mandir (Devanagari: भारतदुर्गा मंदिर) is a proposed temple in the Nagpur district of the Maharashtra state in India. It is located at the premises of the National Cancer Institute in Nagpur. The foundation stone of the temple was laid down by the RSS chief Mohan Bhagwat on 24 April 2026. The inauguration of the foundation stone of the temple was done in the presence of the Maharashtra chief minister Devendra Fadnavis, union minister Nitin Gadkari, several Sandhu saints and other dignitaries. The temple is also called as Bharat Durga Shakti Sthal Mandir.
