= K. S. Sudarshan =

Leader of the Indian RSS (1931–2012)

5th Sarsanghchalak of the Rashtriya Swayamsevak Sangh
- In office 10 March 2000 – 21 March 2009
- Preceded by: Rajendra Singh
- Succeeded by: Mohan Bhagwat

Personal details
- Born: Kuppahalli Sitaramayya Sudarshan; 18 June 1931 Raipur, Central Provinces and Berar, British India (present day Chhattisgarh, India)
- Died: 15 September 2012 (aged 81) Raipur, Chhattisgarh, India
- Education: Bachelor of Engineering
- Alma mater: Jabalpur Engineering College
- Occupation: Engineer; Political activist

Kuppahalli Sitaramayya Sudarshan (18 June 1931 – 15 September 2012) was an Indian political activist and the fifth Sarsanghachalak (Supreme Leader) of the Rashtriya Swayamsevak Sangh (RSS), a right-wing Hindutva paramilitary organisation, from 2000 to 2009.

== Biography ==
Sudarshan was born in Kannada Brahmin family in Raipur, Central Provinces and Berar, British India. He received his Bachelor of Engineering in Telecommunications (Honours) from Jabalpur Engineering College (formerly named as Government Engineering College) in Jabalpur. His parents hailed from Kuppahalli village, Mandya district, in the Kingdom of Mysore, a princely state.

He was only nine years old when he first attended an RSS shakha. In 1954, he was appointed as a pracharak (propagator), with his initial posting in Raigarh district, then part of Madhya Pradesh (now located in Chhattisgarh). In 1964, he became the prant pracharak of the RSS for Madhya Pradesh. Five years later, in 1969, he was appointed convener of the All-India Organisations' Heads. This was followed by an assignment in north-eastern India in 1977. In 1979, he assumed leadership of the Bauddhik Cell, an ideological and intellectual wing of the RSS. In 1990, he was appointed Joint General Secretary of the organisation.

Sudarshan became Sarsanghachalak of the RSS on 11 March 2000. He succeeded Rajendra Singh, who had stepped down on health grounds.

In his acceptance speech, Sudarshan recounted being personally selected to lead the RSS in the Madhya Bharat region. He stated that although he was initially reluctant to assume the responsibility, the then RSS Sarsanghachalak M. S. Golwalkar played a key role in persuading him to accept the position.

A hardliner, many of his statements drew sharp criticism from both the Bharatiya Janata Party (BJP) and Dalits across India. He frequently clashed with the government of Atal Bihari Vajpayee. He stepped down as Sarsanghachalak on 21 March 2009, due to poor health, with Mohan Bhagwat succeeding him.

He struggled with dementia in his later years, at one time having gone missing in Mysore. He died on 15 September 2012, due to a heart attack. He was cremated in Nagpur.

== Ideology and views ==
Sudarshan deeply opposed the Constitution of India, stating "Throw away the outdated Indian Constitution which speaks of British legacy." He once also stated "This constitution does not reflect the basic ethos of this nation."

Sudarshan viewed India as a Hindu nation, asserting, "India by definition is Hindu. The culture of this country is Hindu. Because Hindus form the backbone of this nation." He further emphasised his belief by stating, "It is the ancient-most nation in the world." Sudarshan also regarded all Indians, irrespective of their religion, as inherently Hindu, claiming, "Their [Muslims and Christians] forefathers were Hindu. And the blood flowing in their veins is also, and the blood of their forefathers is Hindu."

He was a vocal critic of the government led by Vajpayee, the first prime minister of India from the BJP, who headed a coalition administration under the National Democratic Alliance (NDA). He perceived Vajpayee as having made comparatively limited contributions to governance, compared to his predecessors such as Indira Gandhi and P. V. Narasimha Rao. Additionally, he expressed frustration with L. K. Advani, whom he regarded as having failed to influence the Vajpayee government towards a more overtly ideological orientation. Statements suggesting that both Vajpayee and Advani step aside and let a younger leadership take charge of the BJP created a rift within the Sangh Parivar.

Preceded by Rajendra Singh	Sarsanghchalak; 2000–2009	Succeeded by Mohan Bhagawat
