= Madhukar Rao Bhagwat =

Indian activist

Madhukar Rao Bhagwat (1916-2001) was one of the earliest Swayamsevak of the Rashtriya Swayamsevak Sangh (RSS). He first started as a Pracharak of Gujarat and later became President of the Chandrapur district and Gujarat’s regional promoter of RSS. He was close to past Sarsanghchalaks including K. B. Hedgewar and M. S. Golwalkar, and is the father of present RSS Sarsanghchalak Mohan Bhagwat.

== Influence ==
He was the primary influence on the early life of politicians including Deputy Prime Minister of India L. K. Advani.

He played a pivotal role in shaping Narendra Modi’s ideological foundation and leadership approach. Modi first met Bhagwat at the age of 20 and later stayed with him in Nagpur during his third-year RSS training. Bhagwat’s dedication to the RSS, his organizational skills, and his ability to inspire young swayamsevaks deeply influenced Modi.

Bhagwat’s perseverance in expanding the RSS in Gujarat, even during challenging times like the 1948 ban, served as a model for Modi’s own resilience in politics. Modi also adopted Bhagwat’s emphasis on grassroots organization, discipline, and nationalism, which later became central to his leadership style. Bhagwat’s mentorship significantly shaped Modi’s early years, strengthening his ideological commitment and strategic approach in governance. He was deeply connected to Hinduism.
