= Dattatreya Hosabale =

General Secretary of Rashtriya Swayamsevaka Sangha (RSS)

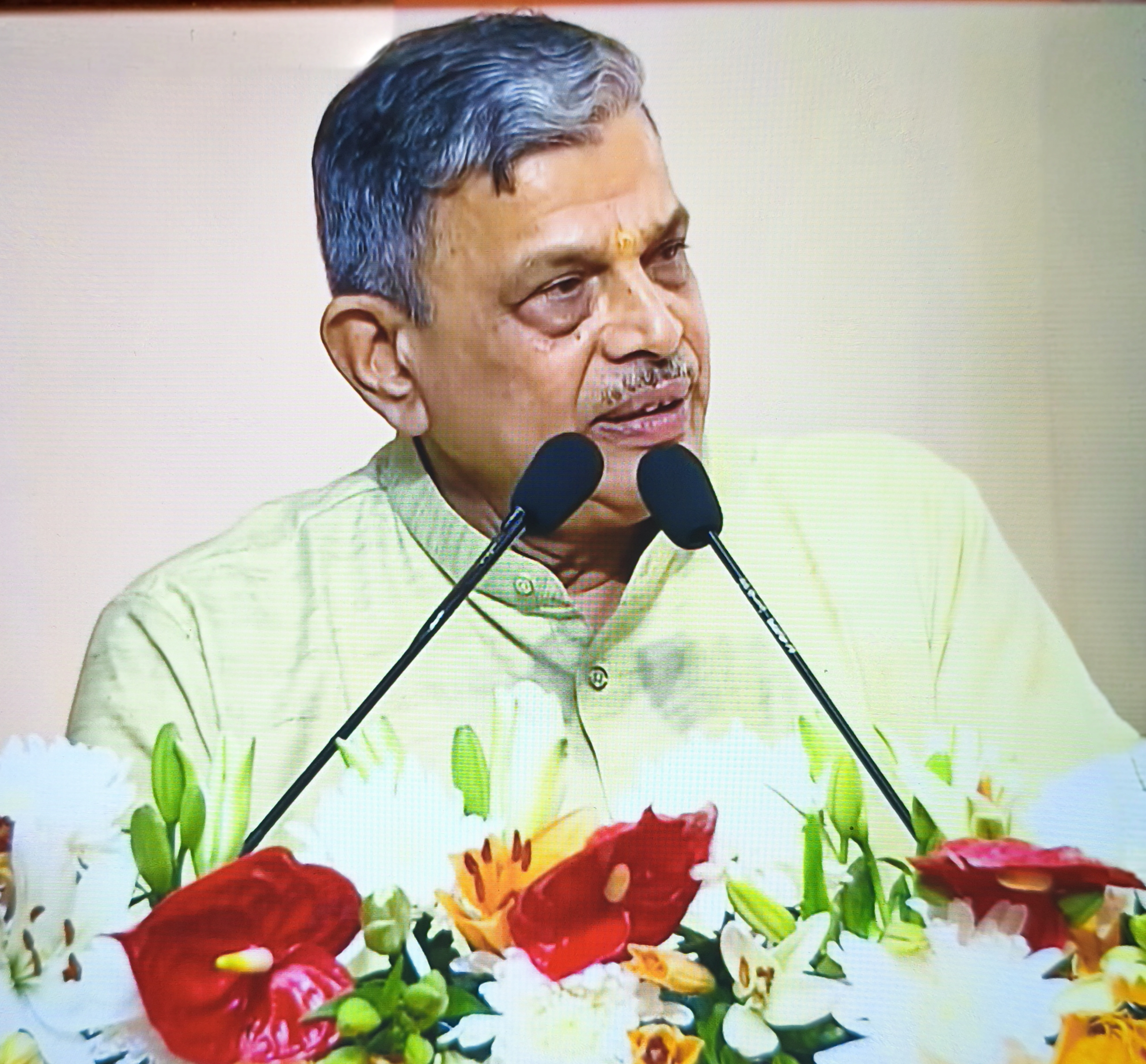
- Dattatreya Hosabale in 2025

Sarkaryavah of the Rashtriya Swayamsevak Sangh
- Incumbent
- Assumed office 20 March 2021
- Preceded by: Suresh Joshi

Personal details
- Born: 1 December 1954 (age 71) Shimoga, Mysuru State (present–day Karnataka), India
- Occupation: Sarakaryavaha, RSS

Dattatreya Hosabale (born 1 December 1954) is the current Sarkaryavah (General Secretary) of the Rashtriya Swayamsevak Sangh (RSS), a Hindutva paramilitary organisation, since 2021. He had previously served as the Sangathan Mantri (General Secretary) of the Akhil Bharatiya Vidyarthi Parishad (ABVP), a student wing of the RSS.

== Early life and student politics ==
Dattatreya Hosabale was born on 1 December 1954, in Shimoga, Mysore State. His family was deeply affiliated with the Rashtriya Swayamsevak Sangh (RSS).

Hosabale joined the RSS in 1968, before joining the Akhil Bharatiya Vidyarthi Parishad (ABVP) in 1972. During the Emergency, he protested against prime minister Indira Gandhi. He was subsequently detained for over a year under the Maintenance of Internal Security Act. In 1978, he became Pracharak of the ABVP. He pursued his undergraduate education from the National College, Bengaluru and his postgraduate education from the University of Mysore.

== Rise within the Sangh ==
In 1992, Hosabale was made the Sangathan Mantri (General Secretary) of the ABVP. In 2009, Hosabale was made one of the four Sah-Sarkaryavahs (Joint General Secretary) of the RSS, under the leadership of Sarkaryavah (General Secretary) Suresh Joshi, as the latter had succeeded Mohan Bhagwat in the post.

Hosabale became the Sarkaryavah of the RSS on 20 March 2021, largely due to his close relations with prime minister Narendra Modi and home minister Amit Shah. A major reason for his elevation was because of his willingness to use the RSS machinery for electoral purposes. He was re-elected to the post in 2024.

== Ideology and views ==
=== Homosexuality ===
In March 2016, while joint secretary of the RSS, Hosable said that homosexuality should not remain a criminal offence under Section 377 of the Indian Penal Code "as long as it does not affect the lives of others in society", adding that sexual preferences were private and personal and that the RSS had no view on that matter. The remark came weeks after the Supreme Court agreed to re-examine its 2013 ruling restoring the law. He said tweeted that gay marriage should be not permitted, and the approach should be "no criminalisation".

=== "Love Jihad" ===
Shortly after he became the Sarkaryavah of the RSS, Hosabale supported the enactment on laws against love jihad, stating, "“The use of fraudulent methods to lure girls for marriage, (religious) conversion, any kind of misuse or taking them to other countries has to be condemned and opposed,” Hosabale told reporters. “Some states have even come forward to make laws against this and RSS supports this.” When inquired over the terminology of 'love jihad' he said that the term was brought into use by the High courts of Kerala and Karnataka, and the practice has been confirmed by them. He added that there is no question of religion in it.

=== Religious conversion ===
Hosabale has claimed that religious conversions and immigration by "infiltrators from Bangladesh and other countries" are reducing the population of Hindus and causing an "imbalance." He has called for strict anti-conversion laws and population control.

=== Constitution ===
In June 2025, Hosabale advocated for the removal of the words "socialist" and "secular" from the preamble of the Indian Constitution.

=== Caste ===
In 2026, Hosable described caste-based discrimination and untouchability as a "blot" on Hindu society. He said that casteism and untouchability could not be ended by laws or sermons alone but required a change in individual behaviour, beginning within people's own homes, and that birth-based discrimination was not part of Hindu culture. He cited the Ramayana episode where Lord Rama accepts berries offered by Shabari and questioned the practice of discrimination in the name of caste.
