= Mohan R. Wani =

Indian cell biologist and immunologist (1965–2024)

- Born: 1965; Maharashtra, India
- Died: 14 April 2024 (aged 59); Pune, India
- Citizenship: Indian
- Education: Nagpur Veterinary College; Dr. Panjabrao Deshmukh Krishi Vidyapeeth; University of London
- Known for: Studies on Stem cells
- Awards: 2006 B. M. Birla Science Prize; 2009 N-BIOS Prize
- Scientific career
- Fields: Bone and cartilage cell biology
- Workplaces: National Centre for Cell Science; Savitribai Phule Pune University

Mohan Ramachandra Wani (1965 – 14 April 2024) was an Indian cell biologist, immunologist and a scientist at the National Centre for Cell Science. Known for his studies in the fields of bone and cartilage cell biology, osteoimmunology, and regenerative medicine, Wani was an elected fellow of the National Academy of Sciences, India and an elected member of Guha Research Conference. The Department of Biotechnology of the Government of India awarded him the National Bioscience Award for Career Development, one of the highest Indian science awards, for his contributions to biosciences in 2009.

== Biography ==
Born in 1965 in the Indian state of Maharashtra, Mohan Wani graduated in veterinary science from Nagpur Veterinary College and earned his master's degree from Dr. Panjabrao Deshmukh Krishi Vidyapeeth (PDKV). His doctoral studies were at the University of London on a Commonwealth Fellowship and after securing a PhD, he returned to India to join the National Centre for Cell Science (NCCS) of Savitribai Phule Pune University. At NCCS, he held the position of a Grade F scientist at the Venture Center Outreach Center and was a part of the research groups on Cell Organization and Function, Pathogenesis and Cellular Response as well as Stem Cells and Regeneration. He resided at the University Campus in Ganeshkkind, Pune in Maharashtra.

Wani's research focus was in the fields of bone and cartilage cell biology, osteoimmunology, arthritis, stem cell science and regenerative medicine. He was known to have worked extensively on recombinant mouse IL-3 and developed mouse models of rheumatoid arthritis in humans. His studies have been documented by way of a number of articles (Note: Please see Selected bibliography section) and ResearchGate, an online repository of scientific articles has listed 50 of them. He was a member of the Task Force on Stem Cell Research and Regenerative Medicine of the Department of Biotechnology of the Government of India and delivered guest lectures on the subject. He also served as a member of the editorial board of the Journal of Animal Science of the Laboratory Animal Scientists' Association (India). Wani died on 14 April 2024, at the age of 59.

== Awards and honors ==
Wani received the B. M. Birla Science Prize of the B. M. Birla Science Centre in 2004 and the Prof B. K. Bachhawat International Travel Grant for Young Scientists of the Christian Medical College in 2006. The Department of Biotechnology (DBT) of the Government of India awarded him the National Bioscience Award for Career Development, one of the highest Indian science awards in 2009. He became an elected fellow of the National Academy of Sciences, India in 2011. He was also an elected member of Guha Research Conference.

== Selected bibliography ==
- Khapli, Shruti M.; Mangashetti, Latha S.; Yogesha, S. D.; Wani, Mohan R. (1 July 2003). "IL-3 Acts Directly on Osteoclast Precursors and Irreversibly Inhibits Receptor Activator of NF-κB Ligand-Induced Osteoclast Differentiation by Diverting the Cells to Macrophage Lineage". The Journal of Immunology. 171 (1): 142–151. doi:10.4049/jimmunol.171.1.142. ISSN 0022-1767. PMID 12816992.
- Yogesha, S. D.; Khapli, Shruti M.; Wani, Mohan R. (25 March 2005). "Interleukin-3 and Granulocyte-Macrophage Colony-stimulating Factor Inhibits Tumor Necrosis Factor (TNF)-α-induced Osteoclast Differentiation by Down-regulation of Expression of TNF Receptors 1 and 2". Journal of Biological Chemistry. 280 (12): 11759–11769. doi:10.1074/jbc.m410828200. ISSN 0021-9258. PMID 15653694.
- Srivastava, Rupesh K.; Tomar, Geetanjali B.; Barhanpurkar, Amruta P.; Gupta, Navita; Pote, Satish T.; Mishra, Gyan C.; Wani, Mohan R. (15 February 2011). "IL-3 Attenuates Collagen-Induced Arthritis by Modulating the Development of Foxp3+ Regulatory T Cells". The Journal of Immunology. 186 (4): 2262–2272. doi:10.4049/jimmunol.1002691. ISSN 0022-1767. PMID 21242512.

== See also ==
- Interleukin 3
- Granulocyte
