= Mohan Bhagwat =

Leader of RSS (born 1950)

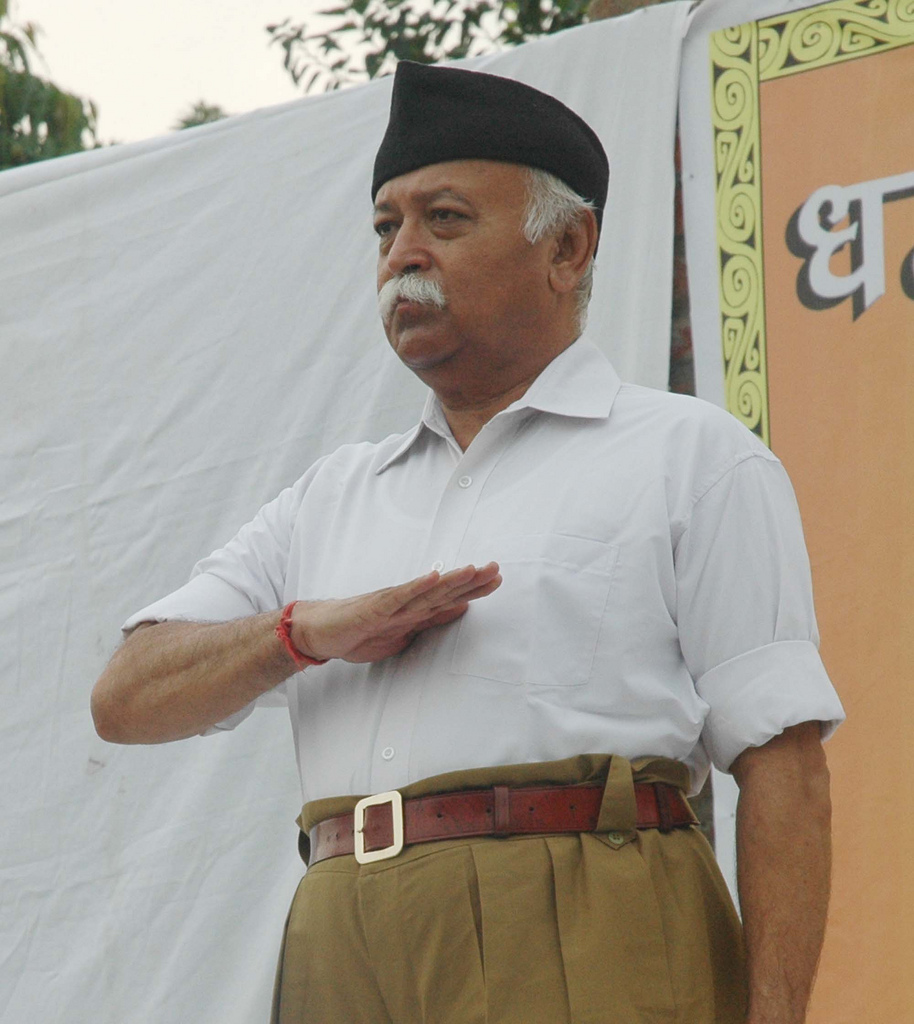
- Bhagwat at an RSS event

6th Sarsanghchalak of the Rashtriya Swayamsevak Sangh
- Incumbent
- Assumed office 21 March 2009
- Preceded by: K. S. Sudarshan

Sarkaryavah of the Rashtriya Swayamsevak Sangh
- In office c. 2000 – 21 March 2009
- Preceded by: H. V. Seshadri
- Succeeded by: Suresh Joshi

Personal details
- Born: 11 September 1950 (age 76) Chandrapur, Madhya Pradesh (later Maharashtra, India
- Relations: Madhukar Rao Bhagwat (father); Malati (mother)
- Education: Nagpur Veterinary College (B.V.Sc.)
- Occupation: Sarsanghchalak, Rashtriya Swayamsevak Sangh

Mohan Madhukar Bhagwat (IPA: [moːɦən mədʱukəɾ bʱaːɡʋət̪]; born 11 September 1950) is an Indian activist who became the sixth Sarsanghchalak (Supreme Leader) of the Rashtriya Swayamsevak Sangh (RSS), a right-wing Hindutva paramilitary organisation, in 2009.

== Early life ==
Bhagwat was born in a Marathi Karhade Brahmin family in Chandrapur, then in the state of undivided Madhya Pradesh in what became Maharashtra. He comes from a family of RSS activists. His father Madhukar Rao Bhagwat was the Karyavah (secretary) for the Chandrapur zone and later a Prant Pracharak (provincial promoter) for Gujarat. His mother Malati was a member of the RSS Women's Wing.

Bhagwat completed his schooling from Lokmanya Tilak Vidyalaya and then the first year of his B.Sc. from the Janata College in Chandrapur. He graduated in Veterinary Sciences and animal husbandry from Government Veterinary College. He dropped out of his postgraduate course in Veterinary Sciences and became a Pracharak (full-time promoter/worker) of the RSS towards the end of 1975.

== Political career ==
After working underground during the Emergency, Bhagwat became the Pracharak of Akola in Maharashtra in 1977 and rose within the organisation responsible for Nagpur and Vidarbha regions.

Following the tenure of H. V. Seshadri as the Sarkaryavah (General Secretary), Bhagwat held the office from 2000 to 2009. Bhagwat was chosen as the Sarsanghchalak (Supreme Leader) of the RSS on 21 March 2009. He is one of the youngest leaders to head the Rashtriya Swayamsevak Sangh after K. B. Hedgewar and M. S. Golwalkar.

In June 2017, Bhagwat became the first RSS supreme leader to be officially invited to the Rashtrapati Bhawan by then president Pranab Mukherjee. In September 2018, Mohan Bhagwat presided over a three-day session at Vigyan Bhawan in Delhi as part of outreach to a wider public, where he said that RSS has discarded some parts of M. S. Golwalkar's Bunch of Thoughts which were no longer relevant to the current circumstances.

In August 2026, an event in New York City featuring Bhagwat prompted protests, condemnation from mayor Zohran Mamdani, and a call from the United States Commission on International Religious Freedom for sanctions against the RSS.

== Ideology and views ==
In a rally in Madhya Pradesh in February 2017, Bhagwat said "Everyone born in the country is a Hindu – of these some are idol-worshipers and some are not. Even Muslims are Hindus by nationality, they are Muslims by faith only." Some months later, Bhagwat reaffirmed this, stating that Hinduism was the only true religion in the world, and that all other religions were merely sects that had originated from Hinduism. Bhagwat said he believes in love jihad, an Islamophobic conspiracy theory promoted by supporters of Hindutva, which alleges that Muslim men target Hindu women through means such as seduction, deception, kidnapping, and marriage, as part of a "demographic war" and a broader global conspiracy.

In 2019, he stated that the Sangh is not confined to any singular ideology or ideologue. He asserted that while the core principle of the RSS is the belief that India is a Hindu Rashtra, a concept considered non-negotiable by the organisation, it should not be categorised under any specific ideological framework, including that articulated in M. S. Golwalkar’s Bunch of Thoughts.

In November 2021, Mohan Bhagwat said he opposed the 1947 Partition of India and supported the reunification of the Indian subcontinent. He stated, "The only solution to the pain of Partition lies in undoing it," thereby advocating for the reversal of the territorial division that occurred in 1947.

In January 2025, Bhagwat said that India got its "true independence" with consecration of Ram Temple in Ayodhya, on the site of the five-century-old Babri Mosque which had been demolished in 1992.

== Activities Abroad ==
In 2026, Mohan Bhagwat visited New York City and held an event at Madison Square Garden. The event was criticized by Zohran Mamdani, mayor of NYC, and protested by Hindu and human rights groups. Bhagwat attended an associated interfaith gathering, and Muslim and Christian leaders later said they had been deceived into attending.

== Awards and honors ==
In 2017, Maharashtra Animal and Fishery Sciences University in Nagpur gave Mohan Bhagwat an honorary Doctor of Science degree.

In 2022, the National Academy of Veterinary Sciences bestowed the Honorary Fellowship on Dr. Mohan Bhagwat among 4 others.

== Bibliography ==
- Yashaswi Bharat. Prabhat Prakashan, 2021

Political offices
Preceded by K. S. Sudarshan	Sarsanghchalak; 21 March 2009–present	Succeeded by Incumbent
