= Yash =

Yash may refer to:

- Yash (film), a 1996 Indian Bollywood musical film
- Yash (name), including a list of people with that name
- Yash (actor), Yash Gowda (born 1986), Indian Kannada-language actor

== See also ==
- Yashaswi, also Yashasvi or Yeshaswi, a name
- Yashmak, a Turkish veil or niqāb
