= Seva Bharati =

Indian voluntary social service organization

Rashtriya Seva Bharati
- Founded: 1989
- Founder: Balasaheb Deoras
- Type: Community service
- Location: India
- Region served: Healthcare, education
- Parent organization: Rashtriya Swayamsevak Sangh
- Affiliations: Sangh Parivar

A European Union MP talking to children at a child labor rehabilitation center run by Seva Bharati.

Rashtriya Seva Bharati (Seva Bharati) is an Indian non-governmental organization (NGO) that coordinates community service projects in areas such as healthcare and education.

== Organisation ==
Seva Bharati is affiliated with the Rashtriya Swayamsevak Sangh (RSS) as well as the official community service umbrella of allied organisations.

The Akhil Bharatiya Saha Seva Pramukh (All India Joint Service Chief) of the RSS guides the organisation, which is also represented in the Akhil Bharatiya Pratinidhi Sabha, a decision-making body of the Sangh Parivar.

== Health ==
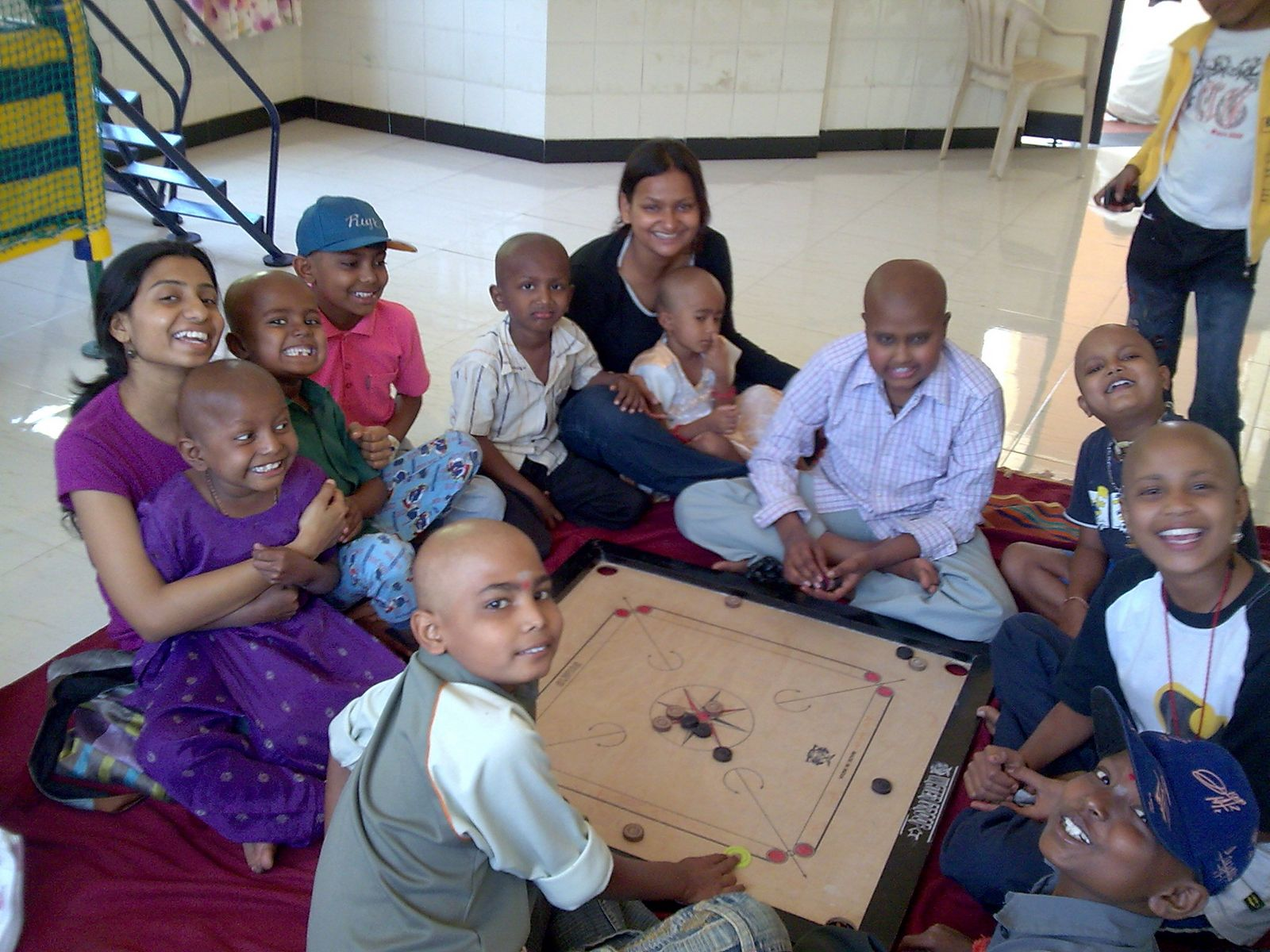
Volunteers with the children with cancer at Kidwai hospital, Bangalore

According to its organisational report, Seva Bharati operates over 5,000 healthcare centres spread across India, including 4,200 rural healthcare centres, 960 mobile clinics, 480 urban resident clinics, 200 counselling centres, 6,500 ambulances, and 7 leprosy medication and rehabilitation centres. Furthermore, it operates 450 blood banks, alongside over 300 blood donation centres which are mobilised during emergencies. Additionally, Seva Bharati provides free and subsidised medicines to patients in need.

According to media reports, the organisation operates on a limited budget and provides affordable medicines to patients. There are an estimated 234 medicine collection and redistribution centres across India.

Rashtriya Seva Bharati has collaborated with several premier technological institutions to modernise India's health infrastructure.

In partnership with the Birla Institute of Technology and Science, Pilani, Seva Bharati has established telemedicine centres to deliver healthcare services across distances using telecommunication. Using the internet and the software "Remedy Kit," developed by the institute, patients' vital health information, including pulse rate, heartbeat, blood pressure, and ECG, can be transferred over using the broadband link from Seva Bharti to Medical Centre, Bits-pilani.

Free healthcare camps are organised in slums and economically impoverished areas with the assistance of hospitals, where hundreds of patients undergo medical examinations, including being examined for cardiac and diabetic ailments. In these camps, teams of technicians, conduct charge-free electrocardiography (ECG), echocardiography, and blood glucose monitoring. Apart from check-ups, dietitians also advise patients on healthy diets, physical exercises, and medicines.

Medicines are distributed free of cost, and counseling on psychiatric ailments is also provided. Seva Bharati also organises naturopathy and other wellness camps for the general public, with the organisation's reports indicating regular attendance at these camps.

=== AIDS awareness ===
Amongst a wide range of activities, Seva Bharati conducts AIDS awareness programs targeting lorry drivers, taxi drivers, dhaba owners, and the youth. Hundreds of participants attend these sessions, which cover topics such as "General Health and Hygiene", "Sexually transmitted infection Symptoms and Modes of Transmission", "HIV/AIDS Symptoms and Modes of Transmission," and "Safe Sex." Exhibitions are also organised, and literature is distributed to raise awareness of the disease and its prevention.

Moreover, the organisation regularly organises health awareness drives, similar to the ones on World Heart Day.

=== During the swine flu epidemic ===
The volunteers of the RSS coordinated with officials of various organisations, including the National Institute of Virology (NIV), the Pune Municipal Corporation (PMC), and the Indian Medical Association, to organise an awareness campaign against swine flu. The volunteers assisted the governmental authorities and ordinary citizens in tackling the flu.

The team of RSS workers, which included medical professionals, assisted the staff of the screening centres. They distributed leaflets across numerous housing societies, intending to reach over 1,000 societies in this way.

== Empowering children with different disabilities ==
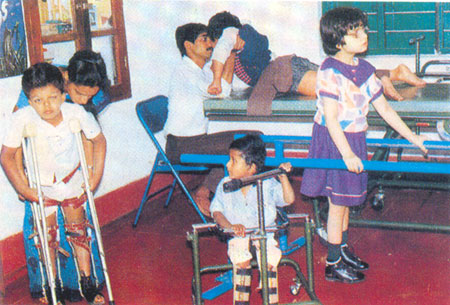
Children at a center for special needs in Bangalore

Seva Bharati operates numerous schools, rehabilitation and recreation centres for children and adults with disabilities and special needs. The organisation reports that it has 179 such centres across India, including special schools, hostels, and recreation centres.

It also organises awareness days on the subject of the needs of children with special needs. Special meetings for people with disabilities held by the organisation serve as a platform for them to interact with specialists and others associated with them. Paediatricians, gynaecologists, audiologists, ophthalmologists, and other specialists participate in such camps.

=== Activities for the visually impaired ===
Seva Bharati and allied organisations operate several eye banks that regularly conduct eye donation camps. Among others, they have provided ocular prosthesis or visual prosthesis for hundreds of blind or partially sighted individuals.

The organisation, in collaboration with other ophthalmological hospitals, runs eye care initiatives for the indigent citizens. These initiatives have covered thousands of slum children and aim at eradicating blindness and eye diseases in children. In one of the initiatives to provide free paediatric ophthalmological care to slum children, held in association with the Narayana Nethralaya in Bengaluru, over 1,010 slum children underwent eye examinations.

Consequently, 200 children were diagnosed with ophthalmological disorders, with some of the conditions detected including corneal disorders (18), squint (11), retinal diseases (9), eyelid issues (16), and cataracts (3). All of these children, who required ophthalmic surgery or noninvasive eye treatment, received the charge-free treatment at Narayana Nethralaya, with over 143 children undergoing various eye surgeries.

The project's target was to provide eye examinations for 10,000 children from slums by the end of 2009. In the last two camps, a team of doctors, paramedical workers, and volunteers from different non-governmental organisations examined and treated over 2,400 children and even operated those requiring surgery – free of cost. Camps are also held in which corneal transplantation is performed on hundreds of patients, curing their eye ailments and enabling them to regain their eyesight. During the 2025 Mahakumbh in Prayagraj, the organization collaborated with the Saksham Foundation to operate "Netra Kumbh," a major free eye care camp that provided eye examinations, spectacles, and medicines to pilgrims over a six-week period.

== Education ==
Seva Bharati runs hostels for children from economically underprivileged backgrounds, including those in tribal and rural areas across the country.

The organisation reports more than 10,000 educational projects in India, including hostels for boys and girls, primary‑education centres in rural areas and slums, adult and informal‑education centres for street children, and single‑teacher schools in remote parts of the country. It also helps students from remote tribal areas to enrol in schools in different parts of the country and sponsors their educational and other needs. It conducts camps for children that teach folk songs and dance, arts and crafts, and painting to encourage creativity.

The organisation has run many literacy initiatives for adults and children. A project in the slums of Delhi aims to make the city fully literate. As of 2024, Sewa Bharati had established 1,250 Ekal Vidyalayas (single-teacher schools) in the Kashmir Valley, representing a significant expansion of its informal education networks in the region.

== Empowerment of women ==
British Deputy High Commissioner Stuart Innes visiting a Seva Bharati rehabilitation centre for child labour, Telangana

Seva Bharati runs centres that provide vocational training to economically underprivileged women. It trains women in making handicrafts and decorative items, and helps to market these products. Over the years, many girls trained by Seva Bharati have developed handicrafts as a cottage industry, particularly in the north-eastern states of India. Seva Bharati also conducts camps and organises exhibitions of handicrafts produced at such camps, and supports the marketing of these items. Participants are trained in fabric painting, hand stitching, pot painting, glass painting, jute work, flower making, cane and bamboo craft, and pith and banana fibre craft. The handicrafts are sold across India.

Seva Bharati reports that it operates 1,404 such training projects across India, including centres that teach computers, tailoring, shorthand, stitching, sweater making, typing, carpentry, and nursing, as well as arts, handicrafts, and recreational activities. These training programmes aim to help participants find jobs and earn a livelihood.

Seva Bharati also runs initiatives to raise awareness among women regarding socio-economic programmes and health. The programmes cover minor ailments, health, hygiene and nutrition, environment, pregnancy, and women’s rights, as well as prevention of addiction.

=== Advocacy for domestic workers ===
Seva Bharati advocates for women working as domestic help in cities who face exploitation. It has addressed issues such as wage deprivation and abuse, representing these concerns to governmental bodies. It has also coordinated with governmental agencies to rescue girls from abuse.

== Relief and rehabilitation during natural calamities ==
=== Following the 2001 Gujarat Earthquake ===
As many as 25,000 volunteers, including 600 doctors, from Seva Bharati worked to rescue and rehabilitate victims of the 2001 Gujarat earthquake. Nearly 10,000 operations were performed, and over 19,000 patients were treated for injuries and other ailments. Additionally, the organisation sent large amounts of relief material to quake-affected victims from various parts of the country.

Following the earthquake, approximately 35,000 RSS and Seva Bharati volunteers participated in initial rescue operations across Gujarat. They assisted in locating survivors and recovering bodies in affected areas such as Anjar and Kachchh. Media outlets, including India Today, noted the prominent role of the organization's volunteers in the non-official relief efforts.

=== Following the 2004 tsunami ===
In the aftermath of the 2004 Indian Ocean earthquake and tsunami, the southern coasts of India were also among the areas struck by the tsunami waves. To assist the inhabitants of the affected areas, thousands of volunteers affiliated with Seva Bharati engaged in relief work. They cooperated with several Indian humanitarian organizations, including Ramakrishna Math in Tamil Nadu, Nair Service Society, Sree Narayana Dharma Paripalana Yogam, Mata Amritanandamayi Math (in Kerala), and Janakshema Samiti in Andhra Pradesh. They have set up relief camps in tsunami‑affected districts of Tamil Nadu, Kerala, Andhra Pradesh, and the Andaman and Nicobar Islands. Volunteers distributed food packets, organised teams of doctors, and performed cremations for thousands of victims.

In Tamil Nadu, Seva Bharati provided food and shelter to displaced individuals on the first day of the disaster. Medical relief was made available in 208 locations across nine districts. Volunteers assisted in retrieving 2,469 bodies by 2 January, and participated in further rescue operations.

After the tsunami, Seva Bharati and allied organisations conducted surveys of affected areas and supported rehabilitation of the worst‑hit villages, including assistance to rebuild homes and basic infrastructure. It also conducted counselling sessions, especially for children, to help address trauma following the calamity.

=== During the 2009 South India floods ===
Floods affected the southern states of Karnataka and Andhra Pradesh.

In the first phase of relief operations, volunteers distributed over 100,000 food packets collected from neighbouring villages and districts in the interior rural areas of Kurnool, Mahbubnagar, and Nalgonda districts.

Since links to Kurnool had been cut off, material was brought in from Anantapur, Kadapa, and Nellore in Andhra Pradesh, and Raichur in Karnataka. Relief camps were set up in Kurnool at Saraswati Sishu Mandir and G. Pulla Reddy Engineering College. Volunteers from Adoni cleaned the Raghavendra Swamy temple in Mantralayam, cleared the carcasses of cattle and other animals, and handed them to the police.

In Hyderabad, 2,000 volunteers went around the city collecting money, food, and other materials needed for the flood‑affected. Two donation collection centres were set up at the state headquarters of the RSS and the Keshav Memorial School. Each day, four truckloads of food and two truckloads of other essentials were dispatched to flood‑affected areas, and 200 city volunteers were engaged in sanitation work there.

In the second phase of relief operations, the organisation surveyed affected areas of Mahbubnagar district and found that 58 villages were severely damaged and 16,000 families were devastated. It supplied kits to 5,000 families to help them; each kit consisted of kitchen utensils, food grains, and other daily‑use materials.

In the Kurnool district, 250–300 villages remained underwater, hampering the survey. In the third and final phase, the organisation planned to rehabilitate affected people and reconstruct destroyed villages.

=== Following the 2013 Uttarakhand Floods ===
Following the June 2013 floods in Uttarakhand, 5,000 Seva Bharathi and RSS volunteers assisted the local population and the Indian Armed Forces with relief operations, providing aid to pilgrims and locals. From the beginning of their aid (16 June), 20 truckloads of relief material were delivered to flood-affected areas from Dehradun.

RSS Sewa Vibhag surveying the area and assessing the loss of life property, 1.Badrinath-Hemkund Sahib, 2. Kedarnath, 3. Gangotri-Yamunotri. Approx. 200 villages were worst affected in the floods, and some of them were completely washed away.

=== During floods in Chennai (2015) ===
Following the 2015 floods in Chennai, approximately 5900 Volunteers from Seva Bharati participated in rescue and relief work in flood-affected areas. According to a press note, the relief work was divided into 15 departments, including medical, rescue, distribution of relief materials, counselling, preparation and distribution of food (breakfast, lunch, and dinner), coordinating, etc.

Around 1.2 million food packets, medicines, dress materials, and water were distributed. Seva Bharati volunteers also assisted the Indian Army in various rescue operations.

=== 2018 Kerala floods ===
During the Kerala floods in 2018, Seva Bharati organised relief camps across flood-affected districts, providing food, shelter, and medical services with support from volunteers and donors.

350 Seva Bharati units and 5,000 volunteers participated in relief operations. They distributed 350,000 food packets, organised ten blood-donation camps within a week, and held 20 medical camps in the Kuttanadu region of Alappuzha district. Forty Seva Bharati ambulances operated in various areas.

In each district, collection centres were set up to receive donations of clothing, food grains, drinking water, and other essentials, which were then transported to relief sites. State-level Seva Bharati officials monitored activities in every district.

=== Recent relief operations (2024–2025) ===
In 2024, the organisation participated in disaster relief across multiple states, including rescue efforts and supply distribution following the July 2024 landslides in Wayanad, Kerala, and floods in Assam and Himachal Pradesh. These efforts continued into 2025, with volunteers providing dry rations, medicine, and temporary housing during the August 2025 floods in Punjab and cloudbursts in Jammu and Kashmir and Dharali village in Uttarakhand.

== Other activities ==
=== Drinking water ===
It has several schemes that provide drinking water to the remote parts of India, mostly those facing water scarcity. Places that face severe water shortages are supplied with water through tankers at subsidised rates or for free. Free food distribution is also conducted in hospitals for ailing poor patients. Additionally, the organization distributes warm clothing and sweaters to underprivileged children to cope with the chilling winters. Under the aegis of Seva Bharathi, a water conservation forum, Jala Bharathi has been started. Jala Bharathi organises seminars and training programs on water conservation and rainwater harvesting.

=== Environment awareness ===
The organisation conducts environmental awareness programs among the general public. Such awareness campaigns were met with favorable reception.

A pledge to shun environmentally hazardous disposable plastic items was taken by the residents of Jakkacombai Badaga hamlet in a remote part of Kotagiri, a small village on the tip of the Nilgiri Mountains.

=== Activities for senior citizens ===
Seva Bharati has a day-care centre named 'Aasare' for senior citizens who face constant neglect from their families and society.

=== Volunteer activities ===
Seva Bharati serves as a platform for volunteers who help manage large community events. The volunteers have helped with crowd management, maintaining order, and providing essential services to pilgrims in centres that are frequented by a large number of people, such as the Sabarimala temple in the South Indian state of Kerala. They set up medical camps and provide basic amenities such as drinking water.

The organisation's help is regularly sought by Governmental agencies to maintain order during festivals. Seva Bharati organises blood donation camps where volunteers and youth are encouraged to donate blood.

== Allegations ==
=== Ideological agenda and discrimination allegations ===
As an affiliate of the Rashtriya Swayamsevak Sangh (RSS), Seva Bharati has faced allegations that its social welfare and disaster relief programs are utilized to advance the RSS's Hindutva political ideology and consolidate Hindu communities. An Outlook report stated that critics and secular organizations have accused the organization of prioritizing relief materials for predominantly Hindu areas and neglecting minority Muslim and Christian communities during natural calamities, such as following the 2001 Gujarat earthquake.

=== Misuse of funds allegations ===
In 2004, the UK-based South Asia Watch rights group Awaaz published a report alleging that international funds collected by Sewa International for disaster relief were channelled to its Indian counterpart Seva Bharati, were diverted to establish sectarian schools, spread ideological propaganda, and fuel inter-communal tensions. The report claimed that funds raised for victims of the 1999 Odisha cyclone and the 2001 Gujarat earthquake were channeled to further the RSS's political objectives.

=== Child trafficking allegations ===
In June 2015, investigations by the Assam State Commission for the Protection of Child Rights (ASCPCR) and subsequent media reports in 2016 alleged that individuals connected to Seva Bharati and the Rashtra Sevika Samiti were involved in the trafficking of 31 tribal girls from Assam. The girls, aged three to eleven, were reportedly transported to Gujarat and Punjab under the pretext of providing them with education, but allegedly in violation of the Juvenile Justice Act and without the required permissions from local Child Welfare Committees. Critics alleged the relocation was part of the RSS's Ghar Wapsi (homecoming) program intended to assimilate tribal populations into mainstream Hinduism.
