= Yash (name) =

Yash (यश्) is a given name found in India, from the Sanskrit word which means success, splendor, majesty, luxury, rich, eminence, and fame.

Notable people with the name include:

- Yash (actor), born Naveen Kumar Gowda, Indian actor, known for KGF film series
- Yash A Patnaik, Indian producer
- Yash Birla, chairman of the Indian conglomerate Yash Birla Group
- Yash Chopra, Hindi film director, producer, founder of Yash Raj Films
- Yash Dasgupta, Indian Hindi & Bengali film actor
- Yash Gera, Indian actor
- Yash Ghai, Kenyan academic in constitutional law
- Yash Gupta, Indian cricketer
- Yash Johar, Hindi film producer
- Yash Kumar, Nepali musical artist
- Yash Kumarr, Bhojpuri actor
- Yash Mistry, Indian child actor
- Yash Pal, Indian scientist and educator
- Yash Pandit, Indian actor
- Yash Sinha, Indian actor
- Yash Soni, Indian actor
- Yash Tandon, Ugandan policymaker and political activist
- Yash Tonk, Indian actor

== See also ==
- Yash (disambiguation)
