= List of members of the Rashtriya Swayamsevak Sangh =

The Rashtriya Swayamsevak Sangh (RSS) is a right-wing Hindutva paramilitary organisation. Formed in 1925, the RSS is widely regarded as the ideological parent of the Bharatiya Janata Party (BJP), India's ruling political party. Though the organisation does not have records of its membership, it is estimated to have around 4 million members. The following is a list of major members of the RSS.

== Political leaders ==
=== Bharatiya Janata Party politicians ===
- Atal Bihari Vajpayee — Prime Minister of India (1998–2004)
- L. K. Advani — Deputy Prime Minister of India (2002–2004)
- Murli Manohar Joshi — Member of Parliament, Lok Sabha, Member of Parliament, Rajya Sabha
- Narendra Modi — Prime Minister of India (2014–present)
- Rajnath Singh — Minister of Defence (2019–present)
- Ram Nath Kovind — President of India (2017–2022)
- Venkaiah Naidu — Vice President of India (2017–2022)
- Nitin Gadkari — Minister of Road Transport and Highways (2014–present)
- Manohar Parrikar — Chief Minister of Goa (2000–2005)
- Amit Shah — Minister of Home Affairs (2019–present)
- Vijay Rupani — Chief Minister of Gujarat (2016–2021)
- Devendra Fadnavis — Chief Minister of Maharashtra (2014–2019)
- Shankersinh Vaghela — Chief Minister of Gujarat (1996–1997)
- Keshubhai Patel — Chief Minister of Gujarat (1995; 1998–2001)
- Pramod Mahajan — Minister of Communications and Information Technology (2001–2003)
- Gopinath Munde — Member of Parliament, Lok Sabha (2009–2014)
- Biplab Kumar Deb — Chief Minister of Tripura (2018–2022)
- Manoharlal Khattar — Chief Minister of Haryana (2014–present)
- Dilip Ghosh — Member of Parliament, Lok Sabha (2019–2024)
- B. S. Yediyurappa — Chief Minister of Karnataka (2019–2021)
- Ram Madhav — National General Secretary of the Bharatiya Janata Party (2014–present).
- Jai Ram Thakur - Chief Minister of Himachal Pradesh (2017–2022)
- Suresh Bhardwaj - Himachal Pradesh Cabinet Minister (2017–2022)
- Naresh Bansal — Member of Parliament, Rajya Sabha
- Kirit Parmar — Mayor of Ahmedabad
- G. Kishan Reddy — Union Cabinet Minister (2021–present)
- Bandi Sanjay Kumar — BJP national general secretary (2023–present)

=== Other party leaders ===
- Deendayal Upadhyaya— former president of Bharatiya Jana Sangh from 1967–1968.

== See also ==
- List of leaders of the Rashtriya Swayamsevak Sangh
