= Gopal Mukund Huddar =

Indian anti-colonial activist and anti-fascist soldier (1902–1981)

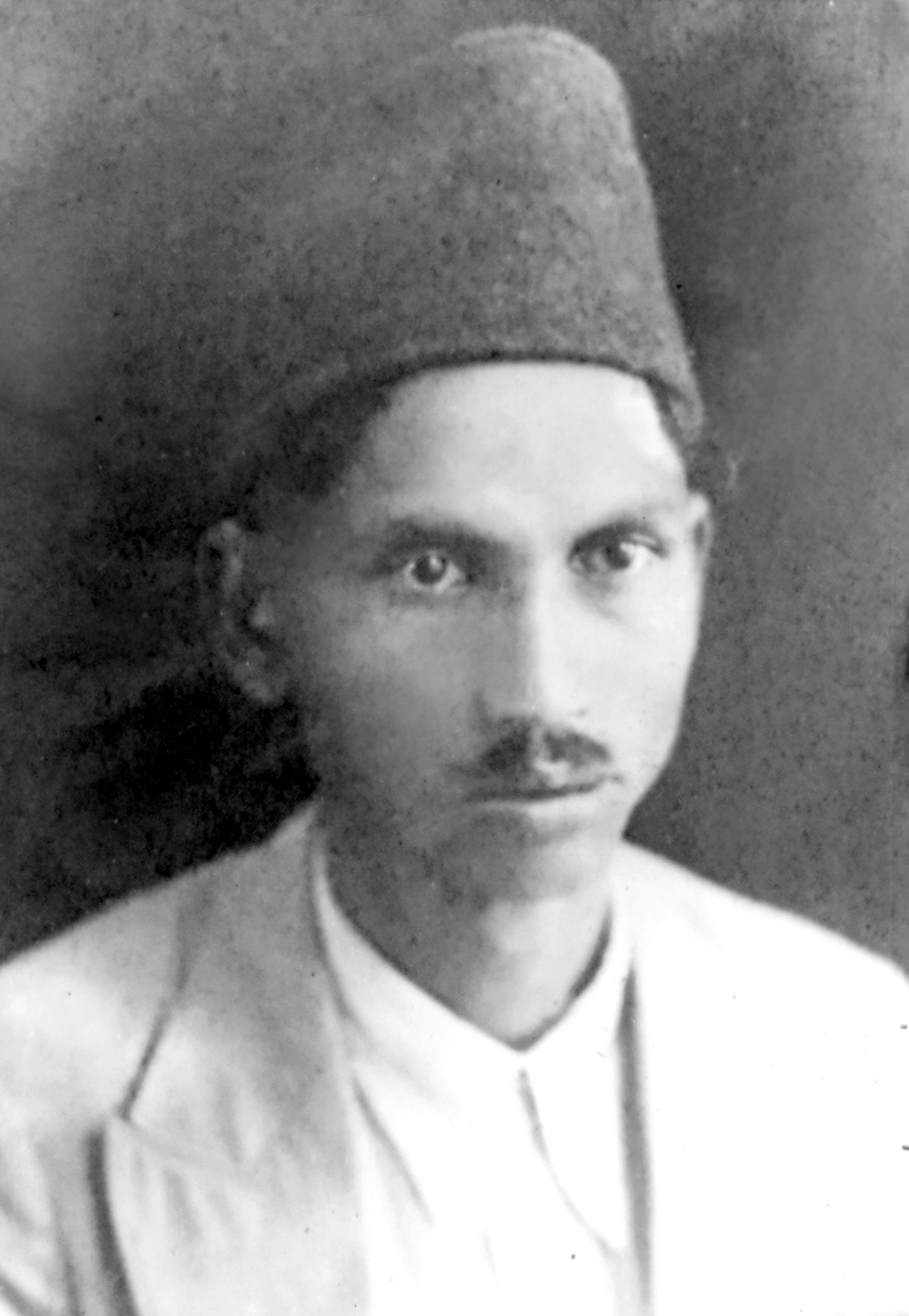
- Huddar in 1936

1st Sarkaryavah of the Rashtriya Swayamsevak Sangh
- In office 1926/1928–1931
- Preceded by: Position established

Personal details
- Born: 17 June 1902 Mandla, Central Provinces, British India
- Died: 1981 (aged 78–79)
- Party: Communist Party of India (1938/1940–1952)
- Spouse: Manorama
- Education: Morris College (BA)

Military service
- Allegiance: Spanish Republic
- Branch/service: International Brigades
- Years of service: 1937–1938
- Unit: "Abraham Lincoln" XV International Brigade
- Battles/wars: Spanish Civil War; Battle of Gandesa

Gopal Mukund Huddar (17 June 1902 – 1981), also known as Balaji Huddar, was an Indian anti-colonial activist and anti-fascist soldier. A leader of the Hindutva paramilitary organisation Rashtriya Swayamsevak Sangh (RSS) in the 1920s, he later fought in the Spanish Civil War as a soldier of the International Brigades.

Born in Mandla and raised in Nagpur, Huddar graduated from Morris College in 1924. He was a founding member of the RSS, serving as its first sarkaryavah (transl. General Secretary). He was also actively involved with the Hindu Mahasabha, a far-right Hindutva political party. Dissatisfied by the RSS's lack of involvement with the Indian independence movement, he conducted an armed robbery in an attempt to raise funds for revolutionary activities, and was subsequently imprisoned. Upon travelling to London to study journalism, exposure to left-wing and anti-fascist circles led him to volunteer to fight in the Spanish Civil War against the Nationalist forces led by Francisco Franco. He was captured in the Battle of Gandesa and imprisoned in a concentration camp before being released in a prisoner of war swap.

Following his return to India, he repeatedly called for the RSS to engage in the Indian independence movement. This led the leadership of the organisation, particularly its sarsanghchalak (transl. Supreme Leader) K. B. Hedgewar, to increasingly distance itself from him. Huddar later joined the Communist Party of India (CPI) where he regularly gave lectures on dialectical and historical materialism. He eventually left the party and turned to spiritualism, though he remained sympathetic towards communist movements.

== Early life ==
Gopal Mukund Huddar was born on 17 June 1902 in Mandla, Central Provinces, British India, to a Brahmin family. He had a brother named Shridhar Narayan Huddar. When he was four years old, Gopal was brought to Nagpur and adopted by a Brahmin widow named Udhoji. In 1920, he assumed leadership in a students' union. In 1924, he graduated with a Bachelor of Arts degree from Morris College, known today as Vasantrao Naik Government Institute of Arts and Social Sciences. Huddar's wife was named Manorama.

== Early politics ==
A founding member of the Rashtriya Swayamsevak Sangh (RSS), a Hindutva paramilitary organisation established in 1925, Huddar was one of the 26 individuals involved in choosing its name. He was also actively involved in the activities of the Hindu Mahasabha, a far-right Hindutva political party. The protégé of K. B. Hedgewar, the founder and first sarsanghchalak (transl. Supreme Leader) of the RSS, Huddar was appointed by his mentor as the organisation's first sarkaryavah (transl. General Secretary) in 1926 or 1928. Hedgewar originally intended for Huddar to succeed him as the next sarsanghchalak. Huddar was also viewed highly favourably by B. S. Moonje, a leader of the Hindu Mahasabha and a foundational figure in the RSS.

According to the scholar Dhirendra K. Jha, Huddar had a "radiant energy" that produced an "impression of absolute reliability", and was known for delivering speeches which "awoke enthusiasm and delight in the listener". His speeches were particularly admired by Hedgewar, who made a point of attending them whenever possible. After missing one such speech in August 1929, Hedgewar wrote to his associates expressing his regret, adding, "No matter how many times you listen to him, his speeches are so delightful that you feel like listening to them again and again."

Dissatisfied with the lack of engagement of the RSS with the Indian independence movement, Huddar decided to pursue clandestine revolutionary activities independently of the organisation. To fund such activities, he conducted an armed robbery in Balaghat, Central Provinces and Berar, in 1931. The act was condemned by Hedgewar, and Huddar resigned as sarkaryavah in protest. Huddar was tried and imprisoned for five years, resulting in the loss of his job as a teacher at a girls' school. He was released on 1 November 1935. By the time he was released, he had been sidelined within the RSS and had become inactive in the organisation, though he seemingly did not resign. Following a period of unemployment, he began working for Sawadhan (transl. Warning), a journal edited by his friend Ramchandra Balaji Maokar, a local leader of the Hindu Mahasabha. Huddar sought to build a militant anti-imperial mass movement.

== Spanish Civil War ==
In September 1936, encouraged and financially supported by his friends, Huddar travelled to London to study journalism. While in London, he became increasingly influenced by the left's international support for the Republican cause in the Spanish Civil War and its struggle against the Nationalist forces led by Francisco Franco. He attended rallies and meetings addressed by progressive and communist speakers; the latter were particularly influential for Huddar. As a result, he decided to volunteer to fight against fascism in Spain. By 5 October 1937, he had left London.

=== Relationship with the RSS ===
In the period leading up to his departure for the Spanish Civil War, Huddar remained in regular correspondence with Hedgewar. (Note: In a letter sent to Huddar on 11 March 1937, Hedgewar wrote, "I received your letter dated February 4 on February 20. Your letter made me elated but simultaneously I became sad to know that we won't be able to meet for one year. But whatever it takes, we have to wait till then. [...] The work of the Sangh is going well. It is true that my health is not as good as it should be. [...] But I will remember your suggestion that I should take care of my health, and I will definitely do efforts to that end.") On 1 October 1937, a few days before leaving London, Huddar wrote to the new editor of Sawadhan, W. W. Fadnavis, detailing his plan to resume working for the RSS upon his eventual return to India. Along with the letter, he enclosed a message addressed to RSS members, urging them to extend the organisation's political movement across Asia. According to Jha, "Huddar's conversion into an enthusiastic supporter of the fight against fascism was quick and smooth. The ease with which he crossed from one worldview to another betrays the fact that he had not properly understood the world he had grown in." Jha further states, "Huddar's association with communists in London had influenced him but it had not shaped him yet." Huddar seemed unaware of the contradiction between his support for the Spanish Republican cause and his continued support for the RSS.

=== Combat and imprisonment ===
Huddar arrived in Albacete, Spain, on 17 October 1937, where he enlisted in the International Brigades. To conceal his identity, he adopted the nom de guerre "John Smith", presenting himself as British. (Note: The use of noms de guerre was widespread in the Spanish Civil War because many countries, including the United Kingdom which ruled India, had banned volunteering for the International Brigades. The Non-Intervention Agreement made volunteering illegal in February 1937. Under British law, volunteering was criminalised by the Foreign Enlistment Act 1870.) He joined the XV International Brigade, commonly referred to as the Abraham Lincoln Brigade, and was assigned to its British contingent, formally named the Saklatvala Battalion in honour of Indian communist Shapurji Saklatvala. To distinguish himself from other soldiers named John Smith, Huddar later adopted the nom de guerre "John Smith Irakian". (Note: He claimed to be from Iraq; in reality, he had never even been to Iraq.) On 11 February 1938, Huddar went to Tarazona for military training and subsequently served as an infantry instructor. On 3 April 1938, while taking part in the Battle of Gandesa, Huddar, alongside other Brigade members, was captured by Franco's forces and imprisoned in San Pedro de Cardeña, which was used as a concentration camp during the civil war; during his imprisonment, Huddar often engaged in palm reading with his fellow inmates. By late 1938, amid public pressure on the British government to secure the release of British citizens held by Franco's forces, a team was dispatched to arrange a prisoner of war swap, leading to Huddar's release.

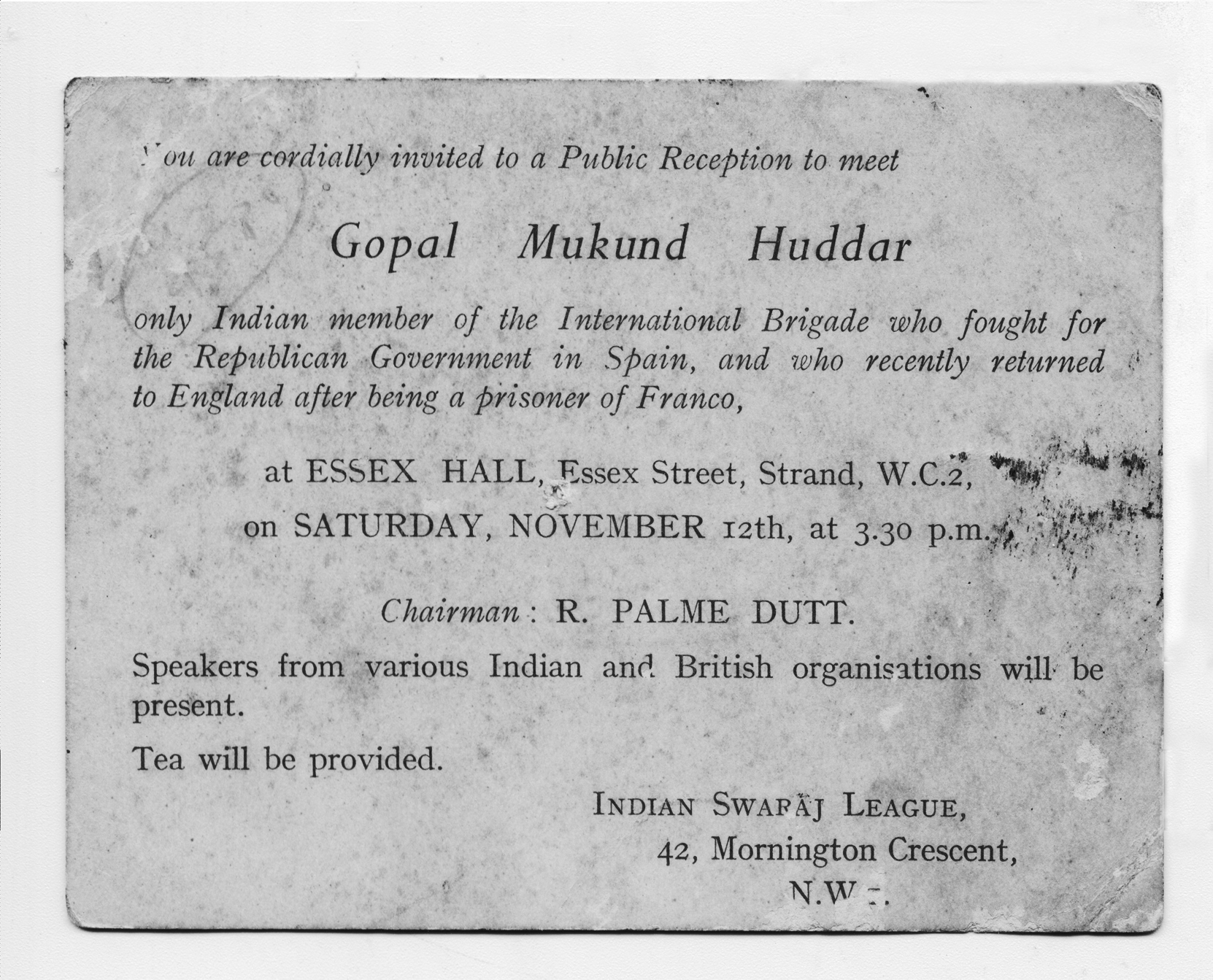
On 12 November 1938, a few days after his release from San Pedro de Cardeña, Huddar was accorded a public reception in London by the Indian Swaraj League, chaired by R. Palme Dutt, a leader of the Communist Party of Great Britain. (Note: Although he was highlighted as the sole Indian member of the International Brigades, he was in fact one of several Indian volunteers, including writer Mulk Raj Anand.)

By the time of his release from San Pedro de Cardeña, Huddar had abandoned many of his earlier views and had come to espouse a worldview entirely different from that of the RSS. Nevertheless, he remained deferential towards Hedgewar.

=== Return to India ===
Huddar returned to India on 18 December 1938. Arriving in Bombay (now Mumbai), he addressed a rally organised by several Bombay trade unions and the Bombay Congress Socialist Party, where he spoke:

The honour you have done me is really the honour to the cause of democracy and freedom which Spanish workers and peasants are defending with their lives. [...] The fight for democracy is in India just as it is in Spain. The very same British Imperialism which helps Franco and Mussolini in their attempt to destroy Spain is holding us down. We have to fight against it. We have to build the unity of the workers, peasants and the middle classes just as the Spanish people have done.

== Later politics ==
=== Estrangement from the RSS ===
A few days after his return to India, Huddar had a meeting with Hedgewar. By then, Huddar was, as Jha states, "no longer blind to the motivations that fuelled the RSS or naïve about the mechanisms by which it sought to achieve its objectives." However, he remained convinced that he could persuade Hedgewar to align the RSS, an organisation which actively collaborated with the British Raj and played no role in the Indian independence movement, with the anti-colonial cause. Hedgewar, who had become increasingly obedient to the colonial government during Huddar's absence, grew alienated by his suggestions. According to Huddar, "My words fell on deaf ears and all my efforts to woo the Sarsanghchalak came to naught." Following the meeting, the two became increasingly distant.

On 7 July 1939, Huddar visited Hedgewar in Deolali as an emissary of the anti-colonial nationalist Subhas Chandra Bose, who had contacted him in Bombay in an effort to involve the RSS in the anti-colonial movement. Accompanied by Shah, an associate of Bose, Huddar found Hedgewar apparently in good health, talking with young RSS members. Huddar conveyed Bose's wish to meet him, as Shah waited outside; Hedgewar declined, claiming to be too ill to talk to Bose or even to Shah. Huddar later recalled that as he left, the RSS members returned and laughter resumed. (Note: In later years, RSS authors, such as Rakesh Sinha, have propagated an opposite version of the exchange, where Hedgewar never refused the call to join the anti-colonial movement. Furthermore, Sinha incorrectly identifies the location of the incident, stating that it occurred in Nagpur. According to Jha, such a counter-narrative serves as a "clear case of myth-making", in alignment with the RSS's desire to retroactively associate itself with the Indian independence movement.) Huddar's estrangement from the RSS led Hedgewar to develop a growing interest in M. S. Golwalkar, who later succeeded him as the second sarsanghchalak.

=== Communist Party of India and spiritualism ===
Huddar became a member of the Communist Party of India (CPI) in December 1938 or 1940. During his time as a member of the CPI, he became associated with the young A. B. Bardhan, who would go on to become the general secretary of the party. Huddar worked for the cause of the peasants and labourers in the countryside around Nagpur, and regularly gave lectures on dialectical and historical materialism. He left the party in 1952, after which he gradually distanced himself from political activities. According to Bardhan, this retreat was due to his declining health as well as a move towards spiritualism. Nevertheless, Huddar remained sympathetic to communist movements.

According to the scholar Govind Purushottam Deshpande, Huddar criticised the RSS's understanding of Hinduism; he sought to move it away from a theology-based conception. Huddar's understanding of Hinduism was based on traditions and cultural practices rather than religiosity and dharma.

== Death and legacy ==
Huddar died in 1981. Within his political circle, he was also known as Balaji Huddar; Balaji is another name for Venkateswara, a Hindu deity. He has since been largely forgotten, but his birth centenary in 2002 saw a small Nagpur-based journal, Marathi Gramsevak, publish a tribute written by Bardhan.
