= 2026 New York City RSS controversy =

On August 10, 2026, the Hindu group American Hindus for Engagement and Dialogue (AHEAD) Forum announced the Universal Oneness Celebration (UOC) for August 29, 2026, in New York, featuring Rashtriya Swayamsevak Sangh (RSS) chief Mohan Bhagwat. The event took place on August 29, in Madison Square Garden, where Mohan Bhagwat held a speech, presenting Vasudhaiva Kutumbakam ("The World Is One Family"). The event was met by widespread criticism and protests.

== Controversy ==
RSS is widely considered to be a extremist paramilitary group, adopting the far-right Hindutva ideology. The group, which primarily operates in India, has carried out terrorist attacks against Islamic places of worship as well as Christians, and engaged in forced conversions.

NYC Mayor Zohran Mamdani publicly criticized the group, describing them as "exclusionary". When asked about the UOC event at a press conference, Mamdani said "I don't support the rally, but I don't know if the city has any jurisdiction on canceling a private event." He has criticized the Indian government in the past, describing Narendra Modi as a "war criminal" for his role in the 2002 Gujarat violence, and writing to jailed Indian student activist Umar Khalid, who has been imprisoned since 2020 without trial.

Ajit Sahi, the director of public affairs for the Indian American Muslim Council (IAMC), stated that affiliates of the RSS group have participated in anti-Muslim and anti-Christian violence and attacks on places of worship, and that one of "America's most prominent venues is conferring legitimacy on the leader of an organization associated with severe religious persecution and violence".

The US Commission on International Religious Freedom (USCIRF) urged sanctions against the RSS and requested that the US government not support diplomatic relations with RSS members, describing them as an "umbrella organization whose sub-groups have perpetrated attacks on religious minorities, including Christians and Muslims".

Other NYC council members such as Shahana Hanif, Lincoln Restler, and Julie Won as well as former NYC Comptroller Brad Lander have voiced support, calling for the event's cancellation, and visa revocations for Bhagwat.

=== Interfaith press conference ===
The IAMC alongside 61 other allied organizations held a press conference in on August 25, 2026 in front of New York City Hall, to protest against the upcoming UOC event featuring Mohan Bhagwat. It was held under the banner "No Platform for Hate", and included a coalition of Muslim, Hindu, Sikh, Christian, and Dalit organisations. Japneet Singh from Sikh Coalition of New York attended the conference, saying that the protest is "not against Hinduism but Hindu nationalism". Kshipra Uke of the Dalit Solidarity Forum also denounced Bhagwat for failing to take action against the rapists of Bilkis Bano after they were released from jail. Sunita Viswanath from Hindus for Human Rights also condemned the event, distancing her faith from the RSS and Hindutva ideology.

A Muslim community organizer from South Carolina who attended the press conference expressed skepticism on Bhagwat's ideas of unity, saying that he speaks "about unity, but it’s in stark contrast with the bloody reality faced by minorities in India."

== See also ==
- Bajrang Dal
- Human rights in India
