= Suresh Joshi (RSS) =

Indian politician

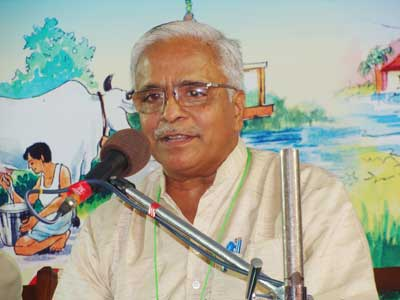

Sarkaryavah of the Rashtriya Swayamsevak Sangh
- In office c. March 2009 – 20 March 2021
- Preceded by: Mohan Bhagwat
- Succeeded by: Dattatreya Hosabale

Personal details
- Born: Suresh Joshi; 28 November 1947 (age 78) Indore, Indore State, India

Suresh Joshi (born 28 November 1947) is a prominent member of the Rashtriya Swayamsevak Sangh (RSS), a right-wing Hindutva paramilitary organisation. He was the Sarkaryavah (General Secretary) of the RSS from 2009 to 2021.

== Early life ==
Joshi was born on 28 November 1947 in Indore. He got his early education at Indore, however, he moved to Thane for higher studies and earned his bachelor's degree in arts. He got associated with RSS at a very early age.

== Association with RSS ==
Joshi became Pracharak of RSS in 1975. He has served as Sah-sarakaryavah (Additional General Secretary) and Akhil Bharatiya Seva Pramukh. He was elected as Sarkaryavah (General Secretary) of RSS in March 2009. He stepped down in 2021 for health reasons and was replaced by Dattatreya Hosabale as Sara-Kaaryavaaha.

== Views ==
Joshi is strongly opposed to Christian proselytism in India, claiming that Christian missionaries are exploiting poor and ignorant Hindus to convert them, although he said that he is not opposed to individuals changing faith out of the free will.
