= Rajendra Singh (RSS) =

Leader of the Indian RSS (1922–2003)

4th Sarsanghchalak of the Rashtriya Swayamsevak Sangh
- In office 11 March 1994 – 10 March 2000
- Preceded by: Madhukar Dattatraya Deoras
- Succeeded by: K. S. Sudarshan

Personal details
- Born: Rajendra Singh; 29 January 1922 Banail, United Provinces, British India
- Died: 14 July 2003 (aged 81) Pune, Maharashtra, India
- Education: BSc, MSc, PhD
- Alma mater: University of Allahabad
- Occupation: Phsysicist, political activist

Rajendra Singh (Rajju Bhaiya) (29 January 1922 – 14 July 2003), was the fourth Sarsanghchalak (Supreme Leader) of the Rashtriya Swayamsevak Sangh (RSS), a right-wing Hindutva paramilitary organisation. He was supreme leader of that organisation between 1994 and 2000. A physicist by profession, he was a professor and head of the Department of Physics at the University of Allahabad but left the post and joined the RSS full-time in 1966.

== Early life ==
Rajendra Singh was born on 29 January 1922, in the village of Banail, located in the Bulandshahr district, United Provinces. He was born into a Tomar Rajput family, to parents Jwala Devi and Balbir Pratap Singh. His father was an engineer in the Shahjahanpur.

Rajendra Singh completed his matriculation in Unnao. He subsequently attended the Modern School in New Delhi for a brief period before transferring to St. Joseph's College in Nainital. He later pursued higher education at the University of Allahabad, where he earned BSc, MSc, and PhD degrees.

== Academic career ==
Singh was acknowledged as an exceptionally brilliant student by C. V. Raman, the Indian physicist and Nobel Prize-winner, when he was his examiner in MSc. He also offered Singh a fellowship for advanced research in nuclear physics.

He joined Allahabad University after majoring in Physics to teach spectroscopy. He taught at the university for several years, where later he was appointed head of the Department of Physics. Singh was also considered an expert in nuclear physics which was very rare those days in India. He was a very popular teacher of the subject, using simple and clear concepts.

== Association with the RSS ==
Singh was active in the Quit India Movement of 1942 and it was during this time that he came in contact with the RSS. The Sangh influenced his life thereafter. He resigned from his university post in 1966 and offered full-time services to the RSS as a pracharak.

Beginning in Uttar Pradesh, Singh progressed to be the Sarkaryavaha (General Secretary) in the 1980s. On 11 March 1994, Madhukar Dattatraya Deoras, the third Sarsanghchalak of the RSS, became the first head of the organisation to step down voluntarily, citing health reasons. He appointed Singh as his successor. While in Uttar Pradesh, Singh worked with Lal Bahadur Shastri, Chandra Shekhar and V. P. Singh.

In 1998, Indian politics underwent a significant shift when the Bharatiya Janata Party (BJP), closely affiliated with the RSS, emerged as the largest party in the Indian parliament. The BJP led the National Democratic Alliance (NDA) coalition government, with Atal Bihari Vajpayee serving as prime minister. This marked the first instance of a central government in India being explicitly associated with the ideology of Hindutva. However, the Vajpayee government's inability to implement key ideological objectives of the Sangh–primarily due to the constraints of coalition politics and Vajpayee’s moderate stance—led to dissatisfaction and criticism from the organisation.

He gave up the post of Sarsanghchalak on account of his failing health in February 2000 and nominated K. S. Sudarshan as his successor.

== Ideology and views ==
Singh once remarked "Official documents refer to the [sic] 'composite culture', but ours is certainly not a composite culture. Culture is not wearing of clothes or speaking languages. In a very fundamental sense, this country has a unique cultural oneness. No country, if it has to survive, can have compartments. All this shows that changes are needed in the Constitution. A constitution more suited to the ethos and genius of this country should be adopted in the future".

In 1988, Singh praised Nathuram Godse, the assassin of Mahatma Gandhi, for his commitment to the concept of Akhand Bharat, stating "His intentions were good but he used wrong methods". However, in 1997, in a rally in which Vajpayee was present, Singh called Gandhi "among the sons of Bharat Mata", adding "He is held in reverence by the society though not decorated by the government with Bharat Ratna", in an attempt to win support from Gandhi loyalists in the Indian electorate.

In 1999, Singh attacked liberals and progressives as a "class of bastards which tries to implant an alien culture in our land".

== Death ==
Singh died on 14 July 2003 at Kaushik Ashram in Pune, Maharashtra, where he had been residing following his retirement. The following day, he was cremated at the Vaikunth Crematorium in Pune. His funeral was attended by prominent figures such as his successor, Sarsanghchalak K. S. Sudarshan, alongside senior BJP leaders including then prime minister Vajpayee, then deputy prime minister L. K. Advani, and then vice president Bhairon Singh Shekhawat.

Preceded by Madhukar Dattatraya Deoras	Sarsanghchalak of the RSS; 1994 – 2000	Succeeded by K. S. Sudarshan
