= Akhil Bharatiya Pratinidhi Sabha =

Akhil Bharatiya Pratinidhi Sabha (ABPS; transl. All India General Body or All India Representative Committee/Council; also referred to as the RSS Pratinidhi Sabha) is the highest decision making or apex policy making body of the Rashtriya Swayamsevak Sangh (RSS), a right-wing Hindutva paramilitary organisation.

The constitution and the roles of the ABPS are outlined in Article 15 of the Constitution of the RSS. The elected members of the ABPS elect the Sarkaryavaha (equivalent to the general secretary, executive head). As per the constitution the ABPS "shall meet at least once a year" and "shall review the work and lay down the policy and programme of the Sangh".

== Resolutions ==
ABPS resolutions depict RSS thinking. They are only passed until and unless there is complete unanimity.

Resolutions passed by the ABPS cover all topics that affect Indian society:

- Nehru-Noon Pact (1959)
- Nehru-Chou En-lai parleys (1960)
- Statement Bharat's Policy vis-à-vis Chinese Aggression (1962)
- Making R.S.S. a Scape-goat (1974)
- Jammu and Kashmir (1990)
- The Cauvery Row: The Way Out (1992)
- Call for Swadeshi (1992)
- Call for Social Harmony (1994)
- National Security (1996)
- On explosive north-eastern situation (1997)
- Ram Janmabhoomi (2001)
- Demolition of Buddha Statues in Bamiyan (2001)
- Cow Protection (2001)
- Priority of Agriculture (2003)
- Preserving Economic Interests and Sovereignty of the Country (2007)
