= Shamsul Islam (author) =

Indian author, academic

- Born: 1947 (age 78–79)
- Education: Delhi University
- Occupations: author, academic, and activist

Shamsul Islam is an Indian author, academic, and activist known for his work on the intersection of religion, politics, and history in India. He is a retired professor of political science from the University of Delhi, where he taught from 1973 to 2013. He has been particularly vocal about the rise of communalism and the distortion of historical narratives, especially in the context of Hindu-Muslim relations in India. His work often critiques the ideological underpinnings of the Hindu nationalist movement, particularly its attempts to rewrite Indian history in a way that marginalises minority communities.

== Early life and education ==
He was born in 1948 in India. He pursued his higher education at the University of Delhi, where he later became a professor of political science. His academic journey and early life experiences influenced his critical perspectives on political and social issues in India.

== Career ==
Shamsul Islam taught political science at the University of Delhi from 1973 to 2013. During his tenure, he became known for his critical stance against Hindutva, religious bigotry, and the persecution of women, Dalits, and minorities. His work spans various forms of writing, including books, articles, and street plays.

He has been actively involved in street theatre, founding one of India's oldest and most active street theatre groups, Nishant. He has performed in over 6,000 street plays across various countries, addressing issues like caste persecution, gender bias, and religious intolerance.

== Literary contribution ==
Below is a list of some of his notable literary works:

- Religious Dimensions of Indian Nationalism: A Study of RSS
- Savarkar myths and Facts
- Know the RSS: Based on Rashtriya Swayamsevak Sangh's Documents
- Cultural Nationalism: The RSS' Agenda
- Indian Freedom Struggle and RSS
- Golwalkar’s We or Our Nationhood Defined: A Critique
- Hindutva and Fascism
- Savarkar, Sita Ram Goel, and the Swadeshi Fascists
- Muslim Against Partition: Revisiting the Legacy of Azad, Ansari, and Chhotani
- Communal Rage in Secular India
- RSS School Texts and the Murder of Mahatma Gandhi
- Democracy versus Communalism: Right-Wing Politics in India
- RSS and Modi: An Untold Story
- Hindu Nationalism and the Indian Constitution
- The Muslim Nationalism Myth: Causes and Consequences
