= Madhukar Krishna Naik =

Madhukar Krishna Naik (7 January 1926 – 2014) was an Indian scholar of Indian literature in English. He died in 2014.

== Selected publications ==
- W. Somerset Maugham: A Study in Conflict. University of Oklahoma Press, Norman, 1960.
- Raja Rao. Twayne Publishers, New York, 1972.
- Mulk Raj Anand. Arnold-Heinemann, New Delhi, 1973.
- Mighty Voices: Studies in T. S. Eliot. Arnold-Heinemann, New Delhi, 1980.
- A History of Indian English Literature. Sahitya Akademi, New Delhi, 1982. Revised edition 1989.
- The Ironic Vision: A Study of R. S. Narayan. Sterling Publishers, New Delhi, 1983.
- Dimensions of Indian English Literature. Sterling Publishers, New Delhi, 1984, 1985.
- Studies in Indian English Literature. Sterling Publishers, New Delhi, 1987.
- Mirror on the Wall: Images of Indian and the Englishman in Anglo-Indian Fiction. Sterling Publishers, New Delhi, 1991.
- The Englishman and India: Two Lectures on Anglo-Indian Fiction. Karnatak University, Dharwad, 1995.
- Twentieth Century Indian English Fiction. Pencraft International, New Delhi, 2004.
- Indian English Poetry: From the Beginnings upto 2000. Pencraft International, New Delhi, 2006.
- Indian English Literature: 1980-2000. Pencraft International, New Delhi, 2001. (With Shyainala A. Narayan)
- Imperial Embrace: Studies in Anglo-Indian Fiction. Abhinav Publishers, New Delhi, 2008.
