= Madhukar Keche =

Marathi writer

- Madhukar Baburao Keche
- Born: January 14, 1932; Wardha, Maharashtra, India
- Died: March 25, 1993 (aged 61)
- Occupations: Poet, Fine Essayist
- Writing career
- Notable works: Rashtrasant Tukadoji Maharaj, Shri Sant Gadge Maharaj, Warhadi Mandali

Madhukar Keche (1932 - 1993) was a Marathi writer from Maharashtra, India. He was resident of Amravati but traveled all over Maharashtra. He was also a well known poet.

== Works ==
- Biographies Rashtrasant Tukadoji Maharaj and Shri Sant Gadge Maharaj
- A collection of biographical sketches Warhadi Mandali
- Poems Dindi Geli Pudhe
- Travelogue Majhi Kahi Gawe
- Novel Moti Jyanchya Poti
- Collection of short stories Akhar Angan
- Travel travelling 'Gandhi Parisar' Musings in the Gandhi Ashram Sewagram.

A Phd thesis on his work is also published.
