= Vasantrao Naik Government Institute of Arts and Social Sciences =

Educational institute in Nagpur, India

- Former names: Morris college
- Type: Public college
- Established: c. 1885 (141 years ago)
- Accreditation: NAAC Re-Accredited 'B++' Grade, CGPA 2.91
- Affiliations: Rashtrasant Tukadoji Maharaj Nagpur University
- Director: Manohar Kumbhare
- Academic staff: 50
- Students: 1,691
- Location: Nagpur, Maharashtra, India
- Campus: 22 acres (8.9 ha); Urban
- Website: www.vngiassnagpur.org

Vasantrao Naik Government Institute of Arts and Social Sciences, established in 1885 as Morris college, is one of the oldest general degree colleges in Nagpur, Maharashtra, India. It takes its name from the former Chief Minister of Maharashtra, the late Vasantrao Naik, who was an alumnus of the college. It is affiliated to Rashtrasant Tukadoji Maharaj Nagpur University.

== History ==
Although Nagpur was capital of Central Provinces, there was no college there in 1882, when, under the leadership of Sir Bipin Krishna Bose, Mukund Balkrishna Buti, Madhao Rao Gangadhar Chitanavis and others, the Committee of the Neill City High School of Nagpur took the initiative, and collected the sum of Rs 19,000 and started a college at Nagpur in memory of Sir John Morris. Later they formed The Nagpur Morris College Association, and they approached the Chief Commissioner of the Central Provinces to established a college, which was eventually established in June 1885.

VNGIASS was affiliated to Calcutta University until 1904, and later to Allahabad University. In 1923 it was one of six colleges affiliated to Nagpur University

After hundred years of existence, the college was renamed as Vasantrao Naik Government Institute of Arts and Social Sciences, by Chief Minister Sudhakarrao Naik, in 1985. This was in honour of Shri Vasantrao Naik, his uncle, who served the longest tenure as the Chief Minister of Maharashtra.

== Academics ==
The college is recognized by the University Grants Commission (UGC).

== Notable alumni ==
Notable alumni from the college include:

- Gopal Mukund Huddar (1902–1981), Indian anti-colonial activist and soldier
- Vasantrao Naik (1913–1979), former chief minister of Maharashtra (1963–1975)
