= List of leaders of the Rashtriya Swayamsevak Sangh =

The article lists the leaders of the Rashtriya Swayamsevak Sangh (RSS). The RSS is an Indian Hindutva paramilitary organisation, which is widely regarded as the ideological parent of the Bharatiya Janata Party (BJP), India's ruling political party. In the 21st century, it is the world's largest far-right organisation by membership.

== Sarsanghchalak ==
Sarsanghchalak of the Rashtriya Swayamsevak Sangh
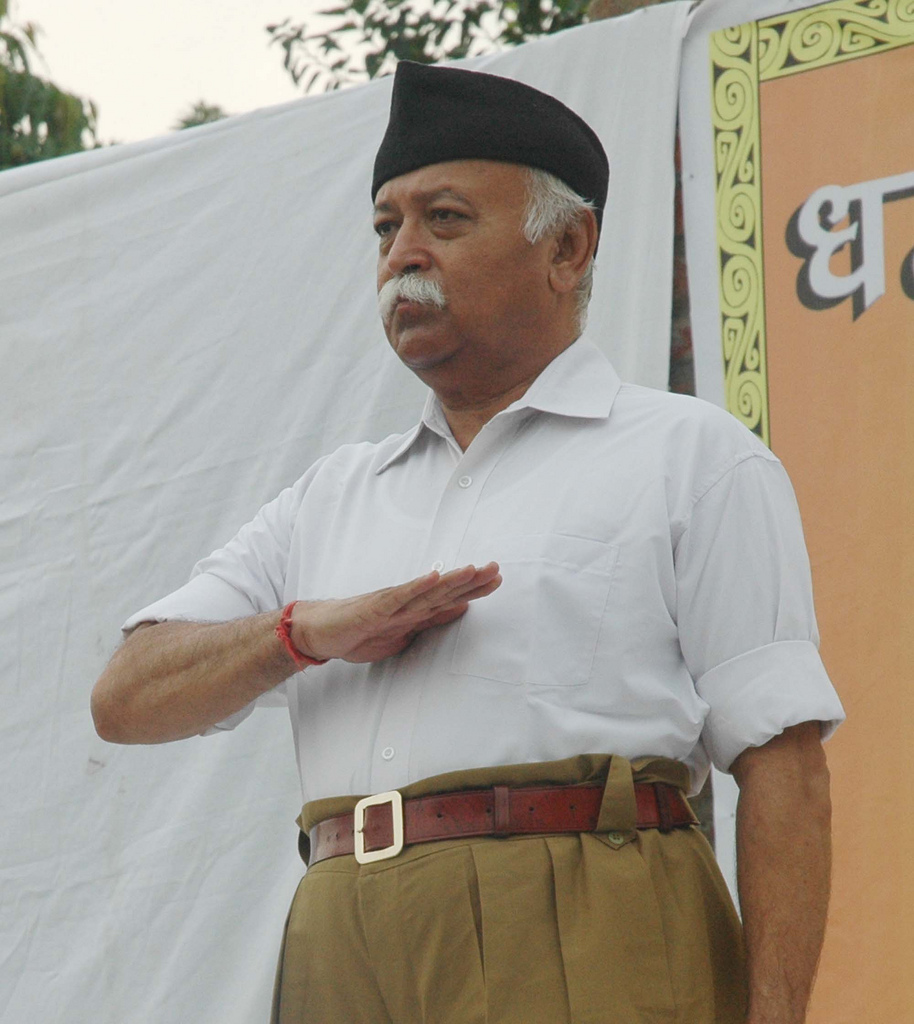
- Incumbent; Mohan Bhagwat since 21 March 2009
- Rashtriya Swayamsevak Sangh
- Type: Supreme leader of a paramilitary organisation
- Member of: Sangh Parivar
- Appointer: Outgoing Sarsanghchalak
- Term length: No term limit
- Formation: 27 September 1925
- First holder: K. B. Hedgewar

The sarsanghchalak (transl. Supreme Leader) serves as the leader of the RSS. The position is decided, through nomination, by the predecessor. Since the formation of the RSS in 1925, six individuals have served as the sarsanghchalak. K. B. Hedgewar, the founder of the RSS, also served as its first sarsanghchalak. The sixth and current sarsanghchalak of the organisation is Mohan Bhagwat.

=== List of officeholders ===
No.	Portrait	Name (Birth–Death)	Term of office			Ref.
No.	Portrait	Name (Birth–Death)	Took office	Left office	Time in office	Ref.
1		K. B. Hedgewar (1889–1940)	27 September 1925	21 June 1940	14 years, 268 days	
2		M. S. Golwalkar (1906–1973)	21 June 1940	5 June 1973	32 years, 349 days	
3		Madhukar Dattatraya Deoras (1915–1996)	5 June 1973	11 March 1994	20 years, 279 days	
4		Rajendra Singh (1922–2003)	11 March 1994	10 March 2000	5 years, 365 days	
5		K. S. Sudarshan (1931–2012)	10 March 2000	21 March 2009	9 years, 11 days	
6		Mohan Bhagwat (born 1950)	21 March 2009	Incumbent	17 years, 185 days	

== Sarkaryavah ==
Sarkaryavah of the Rashtriya Swayamsevak Sangh
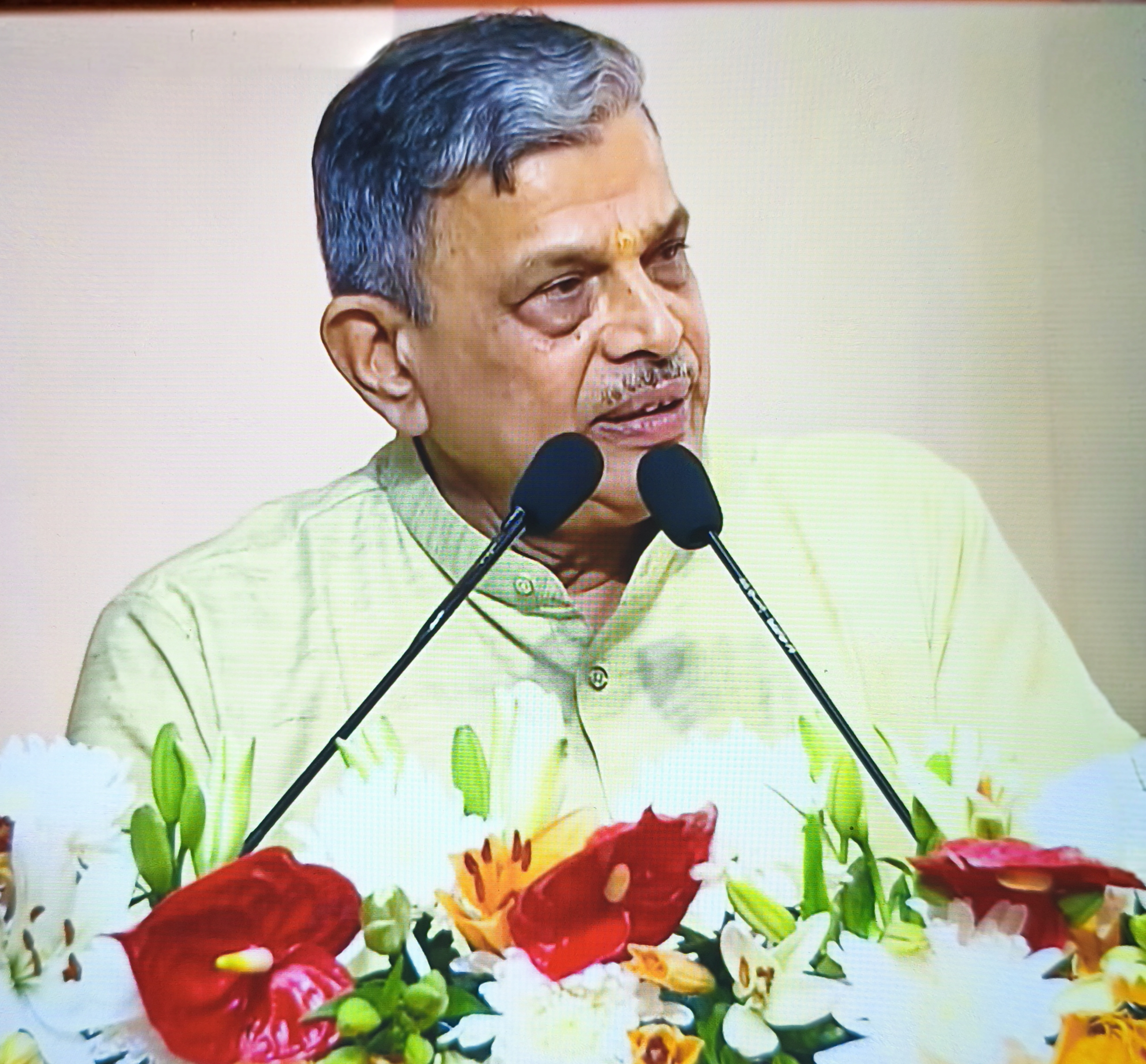
- Incumbent; Dattatreya Hosabale since 20 March 2021
- Rashtriya Swayamsevak Sangh
- Type: General secretary of a paramilitary organisation
- Member of: Sangh Parivar
- Appointer: Elected by members of the Akhil Bharatiya Pratinidhi Sabha
- Term length: No term limit
- Formation: 1926 or 1928
- First holder: Gopal Mukund Huddar

The sarkaryavah (transl. General Secretary) serves as the operational head of the RSS. The position is elected by members of the Akhil Bharatiya Pratinidhi Sabha, in elections that occur once every three years. Gopal Mukund Huddar served as the first sarkaryavah of the organisation. Dattatreya Hosabale is the current sarkaryavah, who has been serving since 2021.

=== List of officeholders ===
No.	Portrait	Name (Birth–Death)	Term of office			Ref.
No.	Portrait	Name (Birth–Death)	Took office	Left office	Time in office	Ref.
1		Gopal Mukund Huddar (1902–1981)	1926/1928	1931	c. 5 years/c. 3 years	
–		M. S. Golwalkar (1906–1973)	13 August 1939	21 June 1940	313 days	
–		H. V. Seshadri (1926–2005)	1987	2000	c. 13 years	
–		Mohan Bhagwat (born 1950)	2000	21 March 2009	c. 9 years	
–		Suresh Joshi (born 1947)	21 March 2009	20 March 2021	11 years, 364 days	
–		Dattatreya Hosabale (born 1954)	20 March 2021	Incumbent	5 years, 185 days	

== See also ==
- List of members of the Rashtriya Swayamsevak Sangh
- List of national presidents of the Bharatiya Janata Party
