= Yashaswi =

Given name common in Southeast Asia

Yashasvi is a Sanskrit word means eternal success or fame for eternity. It can be used as either a noun or a verb. It can also be spelt as Yashashwi, Yashaswi, Yashswi, Yashaswi or Yeshaswi.

== Name ==
Naming a boy Yashaswi generally means wishing him to be victorious or glorious or famous or successful. It is not gender neutral. People with the name are mainly Hindu. The name Yashaswi belongs to Rashi Vrushik (Scorpio) and Nakshatra. It is common in Karnataka, Uttar Pradesh as well as other states occupied by Hindu population. Yashaswi is also used by Nepalese.

== Etymology ==
Yashaswi has its origination from the Sanskrit word Yashaswin. The word was used frequently in blessings as "Yashaswi Bhava" during Vedic times by rishis and sages to bless kings.
