= M. S. Golwalkar =

2nd head of Rashtriya Swayamsevak Sangh (1906–1973)

Madhav Sadashivrao Golwalkar
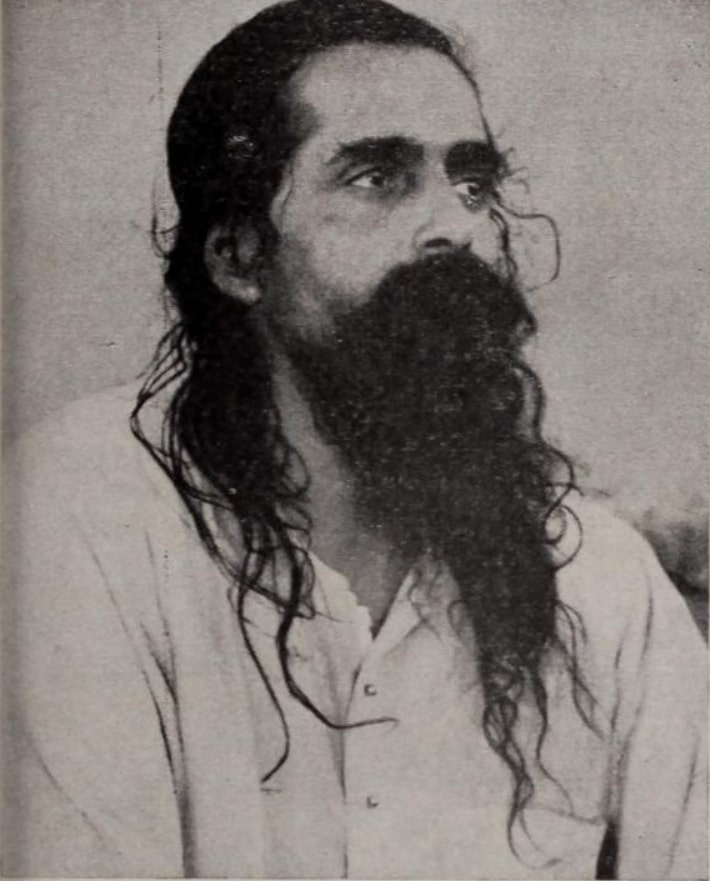
- Golwalkar in 1949

2nd Sarsanghchalak of the Rashtriya Swayamsevak Sangh
- In office 21 June 1940 – 5 June 1973
- Preceded by: K. B. Hedgewar
- Succeeded by: Madhukar Dattatraya Deoras

Sarkaryavah of the Rashtriya Swayamsevak Sangh
- In office 13 August 1939 – 21 June 1940

Personal details
- Born: Madhav Sadashivrao Golwalkar; 19 February 1906 Ramtek, Central Provinces and Berar, British India
- Died: 5 June 1973 (aged 67) Nagpur, Maharashtra, India
- Education: BSc, MSc, LL.B.
- Alma mater: Hislop College; Banaras Hindu University
- Occupation: Lawyer; Political activist

Madhav Sadashivrao Golwalkar (19 February 1906 – 5 June 1973) was an Indian politician who served as the second Sarsanghchalak ("Supreme Leader") of the Rashtriya Swayamsevak Sangh (RSS), a right-wing Hindutva paramilitary organisation. Golwalkar is considered one of the most influential and prominent figures among the RSS by his followers. He was the first person to put forward the concept of the Hindu Rashtra (Hindu Nation) theocratic state, which is believed to have evolved into the concept of the Akhand Bharat. Golwalkar was one of the earliest prominent Hindu nationalist thinkers in India. Golwalkar authored the book We or Our Nationhood Defined (1939). Bunch of Thoughts (1960) is a compilation of his speeches.

== Early life ==
Golwalkar was born to Sadashivrao and Lakshmibai Golwalkar in a Marathi Karhade Brahmin family at Ramtek, near Nagpur in British India's Central Provinces and Berar. His family was prosperous and supported him in his studies and activities. Sadashivrao, a former clerk in the Posts and Telegraphs Department became a teacher in the Central Provinces and Berar and ended his career as headmaster of a high school. Golwalkar was the only surviving son of nine children. Since his father was frequently transferred around the country, he was transferred to many schools. Golwalkar was apolitical as a student. As an adolescent, he developed a deep interest in religion and spiritual meditation.

In 1922, Golwalkar was enrolled by his parents in the Intermediate of Science programme at Fergusson College in Poona. However, he was compelled to withdraw due to a newly imposed regulation by the Bombay Presidency, which restricted admission in provincial institutions to local students. This regulation was rescinded a few months later, but Golwalkar did not return to Fergusson. Instead, he chose to continue his studies at Hislop College in Nagpur, a missionary-run institution. While his strict father had intended for him to pursue a career in medicine following his intermediate studies, Golwalkar sought a means of freedom from his family. His decision to study at Hislop was, in part, an effort to distance himself from his household. He lived under the guardianship of his uncle, Balkrishna Raikar, when in Nagpur. However, he struggled academically at Hislop. He was also reportedly incensed at the open advocacy of Christianity and the disparagement of Hinduism; much of his concern for the defense of Hinduism is traceable to this experience.

After passing from Hislop College, a pressurised Golwalkar applied for admission in a medical college in Lucknow, but he could not succeed. He subsequently moved to the Benaras Hindu University (BHU) in Benaras, a decision prompted and facilitated by Raikar. He received a Bachelor of Science degree in 1927, and a master's degree in biology in 1929. He was influenced by Madan Mohan Malaviya, a nationalist leader and the founder of the university.

Although Golwalkar attended meetings and was esteemed by its members, there is no indication that Golwalkar took a keen interest in the Rashtriya Swayamsevak Sangh (RSS). In 1931, Golwalkar met K. B. Hedgewar, the founder and Sarsanghchalak (Supreme Leader) of the RSS, who was visiting Benares. After returning to Nagpur, Hedgewar exerted great influence on Golwalkar. According to RSS sources, Hedgewar encouraged him to pursue a law degree because it would give him the reputation required of an RSS leader. In 1934, Hedgewar made him Karyavah (Secretary) of the main Nagpur branch. After he began practicing law, Hedgewar tasked him with the management of the Akola Officers' Training Camp.

In October 1936, Golwalkar abandoned his law practice and RSS work for the Sargachi Ramakrishna Mission ashram in West Bengal to renounce the world and become a sanyasi. He became a disciple of Akhandananda, who was himself a disciple of Ramakrishna and brother monk of Vivekananda.

On 13 January 1937, Golwalkar reportedly received his diksha but left the ashram soon afterwards. He returned to Nagpur in a state of depression and indecision to seek Hedgewar's advice after his guru died in 1937, and Hedgewar convinced him that his obligation to society could best be fulfilled by working for the RSS.

== RSS leadership ==
After Golwalkar rejoined the RSS, Hedgewar began grooming him for leadership and he was placed in charge of the All-India Officers' Training Camp from 1937 to 1939. Although he had only ever been a lab assistant, Golwalkar presented himself as a professor, in an attempt to enhance popular admiration and glorify his personality. His acquaintances and followers referred to him as "Guruji" (meaning "Teacher"), largely due to his image as a former professor and intellectual.

Golwalkar's abilities (managing complex details of the large camp, public speaking, reading, and writing) were appreciated. In 1938, he was asked to translate G. D. Savarkar's 1934 Marathi language Rashtra Mimansa (Nationalism) into Hindi and English. The resulting book, We or Our Nationhood Defined, was published in Golwalkar's name and regarded as a systematic treatment of RSS ideology; the claim that it was an abridged translation was only made by Golwalkar in a 1963 speech. (Note: D. R. Goyal, RSS (1979, pp. 80–81): According to Keer"s report, "Golwalkar... said that the book We which was read by the RSS was the abridgement done by him (Golwalkar) of the work Rashtra Mimansa of Babarao Savarkar. He added that he had translated Babarao Savarkar's book into Hindi and handed it over to a certain man. He said that it was most befitting on his part to acknowledge publicly the debt of gratitude.") However, a comparative analysis of Marathi language Rashtra Mimansa and We or Our Nationhood Defined shows that the latter was indeed not a translation, but only text inspired by the former. Specifically, the pro-Nazi ideas were Golwalkar's own.

Hedgewar made Golwalkar the general secretary (sarkaryavah, the second-most-important position in the RSS) on 13 August 1939. According to Golwalkar, a day before his death on 21 June 1940, Hedgewar gave him a sheet of paper asking him to be the RSS leader. On 3 July, five state-level sanghchalak (directors) in Nagpur announced Hedgewar's decision.

Golwalkar's choice was said to have stunned the RSS volunteers as Hedgewar had passed over several senior activists. Golwalkar's background, training, and interests made him an unlikely successor, and Madhukar Dattatraya Deoras said that several RSS leaders were skeptical about Golwalkar's ability as a sarsanghchalak. In retrospect, Hedgewar's grooming (including encouragement to obtain a law degree and the authorship of We or Our Nationhood Defined), is seen as key to Golwalkar's later success. One reason for his choice is that he was thought likely to maintain RSS independence, otherwise liable to be regarded as a youth front of the Hindu Mahasabha.

As the leader of the RSS for more than 30 years, Golwalkar made it one of the strongest religious-political organisations in India; its membership expanded from 100,000 to over one million, and it branched out into the political, social, religious, educational, and labour fields through 50 front organisations. The RSS extended to foreign countries, where Hindus were recruited into organisations such as the Bharatiya Swayamsevak Sangh or the Hindu Swayamsevak Sangh. There was a subtle yet important shift in the RSS worldview. One of Golwalkar's major innovations was an anti-communist, anti-socialist ideology, with the slogan "Not socialism but Hinduism". According to D. R. Goyal, the RSS' anti-Marxist tinge made it popular with the wealthy sections of society who generously supported it.

The RSS expanded into Jammu and Kashmir in 1940, when Balraj Madhok was sent as a pracharak to Jammu with Prem Nath Dogra as director. A shakha was founded in Srinagar in 1944, and Golwalkar visited the city in 1946.

=== Reorientation ===
Golwalkar's religiosity and apparent disinterest in politics convinced some RSS members that the organisation was no longer relevant to the nationalist struggle. It remained separate from the Indian independence movement, and connections with the Hindu Mahasabha were severed. The RSS membership in the Marathi-speaking districts of Bombay became disillusioned and the Bombay sanghchalak, K. B. Limaye, resigned. Several swayamsevaks defected and formed the Hindu Rashtra Dal in 1943, with an agenda of a paramilitary struggle against British rule; Nathuram Godse (Gandhi's assassin) was a leader of that group.

However, Golwalkar moved quickly to consolidate his position. He created a network of prant pracharaks (provincial organisers), who would report to him rather than to the sanghchalaks. Golwalkar recruited local Congress leaders to preside over RSS functions, demonstrating the organisation's independence from the Hindu Mahasabha. The RSS continued to expand during the Second World War, especially in North India and present-day Pakistan. Many new members were religious, small-scale entrepreneurs interested in consolidating their caste positions with the RSS' Hindu symbols.

Organisation policy during the war years was influenced by potential threats to Hinduism, with the RSS expected to be prepared to defend Hindu interests in the event of a possible Japanese invasion. It also expected a renewed Hindu-Muslim struggle after the war. Golwalkar did not want to give the British colonial government an excuse to ban the RSS. He complied with all governmental instructions, disbanding the RSS military department and avoiding the Quit India movement. The British acknowledged that "the organisation scrupulously kept itself within the law, and refrained from taking part in the disturbances that broke out in August, 1942". In a speech given in June 1942, Golwalkar stated, "Sangh does not want to blame anybody else for the present degraded state of the [Indian] society. When the people start blaming others, then there is basically weakness in them. It is futile to blame the strong for the injustice done to the weak… Sangh does not want to waste its invaluable time in abusing or criticising others. If we know that large fish eat the smaller ones, it is outright madness to blame the big fish. Law of nature, whether good or bad, is true all the time. This rule does not change by terming it unjust".

Golwalkar appeared ideologically opposed to an anti-British struggle. As per Shamsul Islam and Ram Puniyani, the RSS pledged to defend India's freedom by defending religion and culture, and there was "no mention of the departure of the British".

He called the conflation of anti-Britishism with patriotism and nationalism a 'Reactionary View', which would have disastrous effects upon the entire course of the freedom struggle. Golwalkar acknowledged that his attitude confused people (including many swayamsevaks in the RSS), leading them to distrust the Sangh.

At the peak of the freedom struggle Golwalkar had famously uttered:

"Hindus, don't waste your energy fighting the British. Save your energy to fight our internal enemies that are Muslims, Christians, and Communists."

=== Ban and arrest ===
When Mahatma Gandhi was assassinated in January 1948 by Nathuram Godse, there was widespread apprehension that the RSS was involved. Golwalkar and 20,000 swayamsevaks were arrested on 4 February, and the RSS was banned for "promoting violence and subversion". Godse said that he acted on his initiative, and no official connection between the RSS and Gandhi's assassination has ever been made. However, Nathuram Godse's brother Gopal Godse—also accused in the assassination plot—said that Nathuram never left the RSS, and his statement was designed to protect the RSS and Golwalkar (who were in deep trouble after the assassination). Golwalkar was released on 5 August, after the six-month statutory limit expired.

The RSS ban continued, and Golwalkar tried to negotiate with Home Minister Vallabhbhai Patel about having it lifted. The mass arrests, violence against members, and the ban by an independent Indian government of what was understood as a patriotic organisation was a shock to the RSS membership.

Patel asked the RSS to join the Congress, but Golwalkar declined. Patel then demanded, as a precondition, that the RSS adopt a written constitution. Golwalkar responded by beginning a satyagraha on 9 December 1948, and, along with 60,000 RSS volunteers, courted arrest. In Golwalkar's absence, the RSS leaders Eknath Ranade, Bhaiyaji Dani, and Balasaheb Deoras suspended the satyagraha in January 1949 and, in collaboration with liberal leader T. R. Venkatarama Sastri, wrote an RSS constitution. After Patel approved the constitution, the ban was lifted on 11 July 1949. The government of India stated that the decision to lift the ban had been made given Golwalkar's promise of loyalty to the Constitution of India and the acceptance of India's national flag explicitly in the RSS constitution.

=== Sangh Parivar ===
Organisations founded and supported by RSS volunteers became collectively known as Sangh Parivar.

== Writings and ideology ==
Golwalkar is known to have propagated Dharmic teachings. A book based on extracts of his writings, titled Guruji: Vision and Mission, includes a chapter titled "Hindu—the Son of this Motherland", which claims that 'Bhartiya' includes only those who have followed faiths rooted in pluralism, and that Indic faith followers represent this in India since it accepts all approaches towards spirituality. In another chapter, titled "Our Identity and Nationality", he wrote, "All the elements required to develop as a great nation are present in this Hindu society in their entirety. This is why we say that in this nation of Bharat, the living principles of the Hindu society are the living systems of this nation. In short, this is 'Hindu Nation'."

Some of Golwalkar's ideas differed from those of the RSS. For example, in his book We or Our Nationhood Defined, published in 1939, he compares the creation of a Hindu culture propagating the concept of acceptance of a shared Hindu heritage.

Golwalkar always believed that casteism served a great purpose in critical times. He called Manu (traditionally ascribed as the writer of Manusmriti) the first, greatest, and the wisest lawgiver of mankind.

According to Ramachandra Guha's book Makers of Modern India, Golwalkar saw Muslims, Christians, and communists as the biggest threats to the creation of a Hindu state. Golwalkar has been "criticised" for "similarities in ideas" with those of the Nazis, particularly by Hindutva adversaries and critics alike. For instance, Golwalkar's book We or Our Nationhood Defined, published in 1939, includes the following quote:

To keep up the purity of the nation and its culture, Germany shocked the world by her purging the country of Semitic races – the Jews. National pride at its highest has been manifested here. Germany has also shown how well-nigh impossible it is for races and cultures, having differences going to the root, to be assimilated into one united whole, a good lesson for us in Hindustan to learn and profit by.

However, Golwalkar "cooperated" with the British in World War II in their war against Adolf Hitler and Nazism, and the Axis powers, and was supportive of the Jews, showing admiration and sympathy for them.

Golwalkar believed that "foreign races", particularly Muslims and Christians, must either merge with the "Hindu race" or fully subordinate themselves in a "Hindu nation".

From this standpoint, sanctioned by the experience of shrewd old nations, the foreign races in Hindusthan must either adopt the Hindu culture and language, must learn to respect and hold in reverence Hindu religion, must entertain no idea but those of the glorification of the Hindu race and culture, i.e., of the Hindu nation and must lose their separate existence to merge in the Hindu race, or may stay in the country, wholly subordinated to the Hindu Nation, claiming nothing, deserving no privileges, far less any preferential treatment—not even citizen's rights. There is, at least should be, no other course for them to adopt. We are an old nation; let us deal as old nations ought to and do deal, with the foreign races, who have chosen to live in our country.

— M. S. Golwalkar

== Legacy ==
In 2020, the Central Government's motion to rename the second campus of Rajiv Gandhi Centre for Biotechnology after Golwalkar led to controversy in Kerala. Shashi Tharoor, in a series of tweets, asked whether the center should "memorialise a bigoted Hitler-admirer who in a 1966 speech to VHP asserted the supremacy of religion over science." Communist Party of India (Marxist) opposed this move and Kerala Chief Minister Pinarayi Vijayan has sent a letter to the central government requesting it to reconsider its decision to name the second campus of Rajiv Gandhi Centre for Biotechnology (RGCB), coming up in Thiruvananthapuram, after M. S. Golwalkar.

== See also ==
- Indigenous Aryans
- Vinayak Damodar Savarkar
- Gopal Mukund Huddar

Preceded by K. B. Hedgewar	Sarsanghchalak of the RSS; 1940–1973	Succeeded by Madhukar Dattatraya Deoras
