= Madhukar Dattatraya Deoras =

Leader of the Indian RSS (1915–1996)

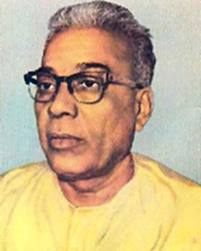

3rd Sarsanghchalak of the Rashtriya Swayamsevak Sangh
- In office 5 June 1973 – 11 March 1994
- Preceded by: M. S. Golwalkar
- Succeeded by: Rajendra Singh

Personal details
- Born: 11 December 1915 Nagpur, Central Provinces and Berar, British India
- Died: 17 June 1996 (aged 80) Pune, Maharashtra, India
- Education: LL.B.
- Alma mater: Nagpur University
- Occupation: Lawyer; social worker

Madhukar Dattatraya Deoras (Note: The surname is alternatively spelled 'Devaras' or 'Devras'.) (11 December 1915 – 17 June 1996), also known as Balasaheb Deoras, was the third Sarsanghchalak (Supreme Leader) of the Rashtriya Swayamsevak Sangh (RSS), a right-wing Hindutva paramilitary organisation.

== Biography ==
Madhukar Dattatraya "Balasaheb Deoras" Deoras was born in a Telugu Deshastha Rigvedi Brahmin family on 11 December 1915 in Nagpur, located in British India's Central Provinces and Berar. He was the eighth child of Dattatreya Krishnarao Deoras and Parvati-bai; the ninth child, his younger brother Bhaurao Deoras (Murlidhar alias Bhaurao), also became a pracharak (propagator) of the RSS. During Deoras's tenure as RSS supreme leader, Bhaurao Deoras played a key role in the organisation in North India. Deoras was a student at New English High School. He graduated from Morris College in Nagpur in 1938 and obtained his LLB degree at the College of Law, Nagpur University. Inspired by Dr. K. B. Hedgewar, he was associated with the RSS from its inception and decided to dedicate his life to its goals.

He was the first pracharak sent to Bengal, and he returned to the movement's headquarters to direct the publication of Tarun Bharat, a Marathi daily, and Yugadharma, a Hindi daily. The Deoras brothers advocated for a more politically and socially interventionist role for the RSS to be more activistic, diverging from the insular stance maintained by then-Sarsanghachalak M. S. Golwalkar. Disillusioned with Golwalkar’s inward-looking leadership, the brothers distanced themselves from the organisation between 1953 and 1957. Despite this period of estrangement, they remained informally connected to the RSS network. In 1957, at Golwalkar’s behest, they rejoined the organisation’s ranks. Deoras’s ascent within the RSS continued, and in 1965 he was appointed Sarkaryavah (General Secretary). During the same year he addressed the annual meeting of the Bharatiya Jana Sangh (BJS), the RSS’s political affiliate and precursor to the Bharatiya Janata Party (BJP). Following Golwalkar’s death in 1973, Deoras succeeded him as the third Sarsanghachalak of the RSS. Deoras chose to involve RSS more deeply in social activism than any other past RSS Sarsanghachalak. His tenure marked a shift towards greater engagement with political and social movements, including efforts to broaden the RSS’s base. In 1974, Deoras directed the RSS to actively support the "JP Movement", a broad-based opposition to the authoritarian policies of prime minister Indira Gandhi, led by veteran socialist Jayaprakash Narayan. There are also accounts and records, contested by RSS representatives, suggesting that during the Emergency (1975–1977), while imprisoned in Yerwada Jail, Deoras wrote several apology letters to Gandhi and offered support for her Twenty-Point Programme, a socio-economic initiative launched during the Emergency, in a plea for the lifting of the ban on the RSS.

In the aftermath of The Emergency, and the subsequent lifting of the ban on the RSS, Deoras initiated outreach efforts towards minority communities, including meetings with Christian and Muslim leaders. In a resolution passed by the RSS's national assembly, the organisation urged "all citizens in general and R.S.S. Swayamsevaks in particular to further expedite this process of mutual contact by participation in each other’s social functions", in a strategic moves aimed at rehabilitating the RSS’s public image, which had been tarnished by its perceived complicity in the anti-democratic currents of the Emergency era. The outreach coincided with a period of renewed political optimism and democratic resurgence in Indian public life, following the fall of Gandhi's authoritarian regime. Under Deoras's leadership, intensified its activist orientation and launched concerted efforts to dramatically expand both the scale and social breadth of its recruitment. This strategic shift was mirrored in the organisation’s propaganda and cultural production. RSS literature during this period became notably more accessible, employing simplified articulations of Hindutva ideology. These were disseminated through popular and mass-friendly formats, comic books, illustrated posters, postcards, inland letter cards, and other forms of vernacular media, designed to appeal to a broad and often semi-literate audience. The vocabulary of the RSS also evolved to reflect this populist turn. The term “the masses” began to feature prominently. Deoras also founded the Swadeshi Jagran Manch (lit. 'Nationalist Awareness Forum') in 1993, against economic liberalization by the P. V. Narasimha Rao government in 1991.

Deoras remained Sarsanghachalak of the RSS until 11 March 1994, when he formally stepped down due to deteriorating health. Deoras’s health continued to decline, culminating in his death on 17 June 1996. Deoras lived long enough to witness a major milestone for the Sangh Parivar: the election of Atal Bihari Vajpayee as prime minister in 1996. Vajpayee, a long-time member of the RSS and a leading figure in its political affiliate, the Bharatiya Janata Party, became the first individual with overt ideological ties to Hindutva to assume the country’s highest executive office. However, Vajpayee’s dependence on coalition partners, combined with his moderatism, generated intense dissent among hardliners within the Sangh Parivar.

== Views of Deoras ==
Deoras echoed Savarkar by stating: "We do believe in the one-culture and one-nation Hindu rashtra. But our definition of Hindu is not limited to any particular kind of faith. Our definition of Hindu includes those who believe in the one-culture and one-nation theory of this country. They can all form part of the Hindu-rashtra. So by Hindu we do not mean any particular type of faith. We use the word Hindu in a broader sense." According to Deoras, even though Mahatma Gandhi appeased Muslims, the Muslims never accepted him as one of their own. He said on 9 November 1985, that the main purpose of the RSS is Hindu unity and that the organization believes all citizens of India should have a 'Hindu culture'.

In one of the most important speeches delivered in the history of RSS from the platform of Vasant Vyakhyanmala (Spring Lecture Series), Deoras denounced the practice of untouchability in May 1974 in Pune, and appealed to the RSS volunteers to work towards its removal from the Hindu society. Deoras declared: "If untouchability is not wrong, nothing in the world is wrong." However, when prime minister V. P. Singh implemented the Mandal Commission Report in 1990, drastically increasing reservations for lower-caste Hindus, in a form of affirmative action, the RSS, under Deoras, accused him of dividing Hindu society. In 1987, Deoras said, "We are not anti-Congress. Our founder leader was a Congressman. Our organisation is opposed only to the Congress policy of appeasing the minorities."

== Bibliography ==
- Social Equality and Hindu Consolidation Balasaheb Deoras (Lecture). Vasant Vyakhyanamala Issue 11. Jagran Prakashan. 1974.
- Rouse, the Power of Good. Jagran Prakashan. 1975.
- Balasaheb Deoras with Delhi Newsmen in the Press Club of India, March 12, 1979. Suruchi Sahitya. 1979.
- RSS Marches on: The Path of National Truth. Publication Issue 15. Jagran Prakashan. 1979.
- RSS: A Force for Social Change Balasaheb Deoras. Publication Issue 24. Jagran Prakashan. 1981.
- Sri Balasaheb Deoras Answers Questions. Sahitya Sindhu. 1984.
- Punjab, Problem and Its Solution Balasaheb Deoras. Suruchi Prakashan. 1984.
- Hindū Saṅgaṭhana aura Sattāvādī Rājanīti [Hindu Organizations and Authoritarian Politics]. Jagriti Prakashan. 1997.
- Samajik Samrasta aur Hindutva Balasaheb Deoras [Social Harmony and Hindutva]. Suruchi Prakashan. 2016. ISBN 9789384414702.
