= Nagpur Veterinary College =

- नागपूर पशुवैद्यकीय महाविद्यालय
- Type: Government
- Established: 1958; 68 years ago
- Affiliations: Maharashtra Animal and Fishery Sciences University
- Dean: Dr. J. P. Korde
- Academic staff: 268
- Undergraduates: 80 (per year)
- Postgraduates: 30 (per year)
- Location: Nagpur, Maharashtra, India; 21°09′57″N 79°02′54″E
- Acronym: NVC
- Website: www.nvcnagpur.net.in

Nagpur Veterinary College is a veterinary college in Nagpur, central India that was established in 1958 with the sole objective of producing graduates in veterinary sciences and animal husbandry to cater the needs of Vidarbha and Marathwada regions of Maharashtra.

== Overview ==
The initial intake capacity of the college was 45. After the transfer of this college to the Dr. Panjabrao Deshmukh Krishi Vidyapeeth, Akola (Agriculture University) as its constituent college in 1969, the intake capacity was increased to 65 and then to 100 with further reduction to 80 seats and subsequently it was reduced to 61. During this period post graduate courses were started in nine subjects with intake capacity of two seats per subject. This college w.e.f. year 2001/2002 has been transferred to Maharashtra Animal and Fishery Sciences University.

Every year about 10 to 15 students of this institute are selected for post-graduate admissions in other colleges in the country under ICAR programme. Nowadays, students are inclined to enter in biomedical research in countries like USA and Europe. College bears huge alumni formed by graduate students, vets and scientist working in USA known by AANUNVC (Alumni association of Nagpur Veterinary College in the USA).

== History ==
In 2005 college has opened Competitive Examination Study Centre through which students are made acquaint with the latest developments in different fields. The Placement Cell has also been established recently to guide and assist the graduates and post-graduates of the institutes for search of jobs and avenues for their further career development.

The Nagpur Veterinary College, Nagpur has affiliations with Indian Council of Agriculture Research, State Agricultural University, State Animal Husbandry Department, Maharashtra Veterinary Council, Veterinary Council of India, New Delhi and State Veterinary Universities.
