= Bharatiya Janata Party – Sikkim =

Sikkim affiliate of the Bharatiya Janata Party

Bharatiya Janata Party – Sikkim भारतीय जनता पार्टी – सिक्किम བྷ་ར་ཏི་ཡ་ ཇ་ན་ཏ་ ཚོགས་པ། - འབྲས་ལྗོངས
- Abbreviation: BJP
- Leader: N.K. Subba (Former MLA from Maneybong–Dentam Assembly constituency)
- President: D.R.Thapa (Former MLA from Upper Burtuk Assembly constituency)
- Founder: Atal Bihari Vajpayee; Lal Krishna Advani; Murli Manohar Joshi; Nanaji Deshmukh; K. R. Malkani; Sikandar Bakht; Vijay Kumar Malhotra; Vijaya Raje Scindia; Bhairon Singh Shekhawat; Shanta Kumar; Ram Jethmalani; Jagannathrao Joshi
- Founded: 6 April 1980 (46 years ago)
- Split from: Janata Party
- Preceded by: Bharatiya Jana Sangh (1951–1977); Janata Party (1977–1980)
- Headquarters: BJP State Office, Golitar, Singtam, District Pakyong, Sikkim
- Newspaper: Kamal Sandesh
- Youth wing: Bharatiya Janata Yuva Morcha
- Women's wing: BJP Mahila Morcha
- Labour wing: Bharatiya Mazdoor Sangh
- Peasant's wing: Bharatiya Kisan Sangh
- Ideology: Integral humanism; Social conservatism; Economic nationalism; Hindu nationalism; Cultural nationalism Faction Buddhism
- International affiliation: International Democrat Union; Asia Pacific Democrat Union
- Colours: Saffron
- Alliance: National Democratic Alliance; North East Democratic Alliance
- Seats in Rajya Sabha: 1 / 1 (as of 2024)
- Seats in Lok Sabha: 0 / 1 (as of 2024)
- Seats in Sikkim Legislative Assembly: 0 / 32 (as of 2024)

Election symbol
- Lotus

Party flag

Website
- www.bjp.org/sikkim

The Bharatiya Janata Party – Sikkim (pronounced [bʱaːɾ(ə)ˈtiːjə dʒən(ə)ˈtaː ˈpaːrʈiː]; lit. 'Indian People's Party'), or simply BJP Sikkim (BJP), is the state unit of the Bharatiya Janata Party of the Sikkim. Its head office is situated at Panchsheel, New Market Gangtok-737 101, Sikkim, India. The current president of BJP Sikkim is Shri Dilli Ram Thapa (DR Thapa).

== Lok Sabha election history ==
Sikkim Lok Sabha constituency
Year	Candidate	Seats won	Change in seats	National Result
2024	Dinesh Chandra Nepal	0	0	Government
2019	Laten Tshering Sherpa	0	0	Government
2014	Nar Bahadur Khatiwada	0	0	Government
2009	Padam Br. Chettri	0	new	Opposition
2004	Not contested			Opposition
1999	Not contested			Government
1998	Not contested			Government
1996	Not contested			Government, later Opposition
1991	Not contested			Opposition
1989	Not contested			Opposition
1984	Not contested			Opposition

== Rajya Sabha Members ==
No.	Name	Term start	Term end	Term
1.	Dorjee Tshering Lepcha	24-Feb-2024	23-Feb-2030	1

== State election history ==
Year	Election	Seats won	Change of Seats	Popular votes	Vote%	Change of Vote%	Outcome
1994	5th Assembly (Sikkim)	0 / 32	new	274	0.16%	new	None
1999	6th Assembly (Sikkim)	0 / 32	Steady				None
2004	7th Assembly (Sikkim)	0 / 32	Steady	667	0.34%		None
2009	8th Assembly (Sikkim)	0 / 32	Steady	1,966	0.78%	--	None
2014	9th Assembly (Sikkim)	0 / 32	Steady	2,208	0.7%	Steady	Outside support to SDF
2019	10th Assembly (Sikkim)	0 / 32	Steady	5,700	1.62%	▲0.92%	Allied Government with SKM
2024	11th Assembly (Sikkim)	0 / 32	Steady	19,956	5.18%	▲3.56%	Allied Government with SKM

== See also ==
- Bharatiya Janata Party
- Bharatiya Janata Party – Arunachal Pradesh
- Bharatiya Janata Party – Assam
- Bharatiya Janata Party – Nagaland
- Bharatiya Janata Party – Manipur
- Bharatiya Janata Party – Mizoram
- Bharatiya Janata Party – Meghalaya
- Bharatiya Janata Party – Tripura
- Bharatiya Janata Party – West Bengal
- Bharatiya Janata Party – Bihar
- Bharatiya Janata Party – Jharkhand
- Bharatiya Janata Party – Odisha
- National Democratic Alliance
- North East Democratic Alliance
- Sikkim Krantikari Morcha
