= List of state presidents of the Bharatiya Janata Party =

Current State presidents in BJP

This is a list of state presidents of the Bharatiya Janata Party. As per the BJP's internal constitution, national president of the party appoints state presidents.

== State-wise party presidents ==
State Unit	Name	Portrait	Took office	Appointed by	Ref.
Andhra Pradesh	P. V. N. Madhav		1 July 2025 (1 year, 107 days)	J. P. Nadda	
Arunachal Pradesh	Kaling Moyong		18 January 2025 (1 year, 271 days)	J. P. Nadda	
Assam	Dilip Saikia		17 January 2025 (1 year, 272 days)	J. P. Nadda	
Bihar	Sanjay Saraogi		15 December 2025 (305 days)	J. P. Nadda	
Chhattisgarh	Kiran Singh Deo		21 December 2023 (2 years, 299 days)	J. P. Nadda	
Goa	Damodar Naik		18 January 2025 (1 year, 271 days)	J. P. Nadda	
Gujarat	Jagdish Vishwakarma		4 October 2025 (1 year, 12 days)	J. P. Nadda	
Haryana	Archana Gupta		29 May 2026 (140 days)	Nitin Nabin	
Himachal Pradesh	Rajeev Bindal		23 April 2023 (3 years, 176 days)	J. P. Nadda	
Jharkhand	Aditya Sahu		14 January 2026 (275 days)	J. P. Nadda	
Karnataka	B. Y. Vijayendra		10 November 2023 (2 years, 340 days)	J. P. Nadda	
Kerala	Rajeev Chandrasekhar		24 March 2025 (1 year, 206 days)	J. P. Nadda	
Madhya Pradesh	Hemant Khandelwal		2 July 2025 (1 year, 106 days)	J. P. Nadda	
Maharashtra	Ravindra Chavan		2 July 2025 (1 year, 106 days)	J. P. Nadda	
Manipur	Adhikarimayum Sharda Devi		26 June 2021 (5 years, 112 days)	J. P. Nadda	
Meghalaya	Rikman Momin		25 September 2023 (3 years, 21 days)	J. P. Nadda	
Mizoram	K. Beichhua		30 June 2025 (1 year, 108 days)	J. P. Nadda	
Nagaland	Benjamin Yepthomi		25 September 2023 (3 years, 21 days)	J. P. Nadda	
Odisha	Manmohan Samal		23 March 2023 (3 years, 207 days)	J. P. Nadda	
Punjab	Kewal Singh Dhillon		29 May 2026 (140 days)	Nitin Nabin	
Rajasthan	Madan Rathore		26 July 2024 (2 years, 82 days)	J. P. Nadda	
Sikkim	Dilli Ram Thapa		4 February 2023 (3 years, 254 days)	J. P. Nadda	
Tamil Nadu	Nainar Nagendran		13 April 2025 (1 year, 186 days)	J. P. Nadda	
Telangana	N. Ramchander Rao		1 July 2025 (1 year, 107 days)	J. P. Nadda	
Tripura	Abhishek Debroy		29 May 2026 (140 days)	Nitin Nabin	
Uttar Pradesh	Pankaj Chaudhary		14 December 2025 (306 days)	J. P. Nadda	
Uttarakhand	Mahendra Bhatt		30 July 2022 (4 years, 78 days)	J. P. Nadda	
West Bengal	Samik Bhattacharya		3 July 2025 (1 year, 105 days)	J. P. Nadda	

== Union territory-wise party presidents ==
Territorial unit	Portrait	Name	Took office	Appointed by	Ref.
Andaman and Nicobar Islands		Anil Kumar Tiwari	1 July 2025 (1 year, 107 days)	J. P. Nadda	
Chandigarh		Jatinder Pal Malhotra	13 October 2023 (3 years, 3 days)	J. P. Nadda	
Dadra and Nagar Haveli and Daman and Diu		Mahesh Agaria	6 July 2025 (1 year, 102 days)	J. P. Nadda	
Delhi		Harsh Malhotra	29 May 2026 (140 days)	Nitin Nabin	
Jammu and Kashmir		Sat Paul Sharma	3 November 2024 (1 year, 347 days)	J. P. Nadda	
Ladakh		Tashi Gyalson Khachu	3 July 2025 (1 year, 105 days)	J. P. Nadda	
Lakshadweep		K. N. Kasmikoya	9 January 2022 (4 years, 280 days)	J. P. Nadda	
Puducherry		V. P. Ramalingam	30 June 2025 (1 year, 108 days)	J. P. Nadda	

== See also ==
- List of national presidents of the Bharatiya Janata Party
- List of state presidents of the Indian National Congress
- List of chief ministers from the Bharatiya Janata Party
- List of Rajya Sabha members from the Bharatiya Janata Party
