= Bharatiya Janata Party – Assam =

Assam affiliate of the Bharatiya Janata Party

- Abbreviation: BJP
- Leader: Himanta Biswa Sarma
- President: Dilip Saikia
- General Secretary: Pallab Lochan Das, Diplu Ranjan Sarma, Rituparna Barua, Anup Barman,
- Founder: Atal Bihari Vajpayee; Lal Krishna Advani; Murli Manohar Joshi; Nanaji Deshmukh; K. R. Malkani; Sikandar Bakht; Vijay Kumar Malhotra; Vijaya Raje Scindia; Bhairon Singh Shekhawat; Shanta Kumar; Ram Jethmalani; Jagannathrao Joshi
- Founded: 6 April 1980 (46 years ago)
- Split from: Janata Party
- Preceded by: Bharatiya Jana Sangh (1951–1977); Janata Party (1977–1980)
- Headquarters: 'Atal Bihari Vajpayee Bhawan' Near Hengrabari L.P. School Hengrabari, Guwahati - 781 036 Assam, India
- Newspaper: Kamal Sandesh
- Youth wing: Bharatiya Janata Yuva Morcha
- Women's wing: BJP Mahila Morcha
- Labour wing: Bharatiya Mazdoor Sangh
- Peasant's wing: Bharatiya Kisan Sangh
- Ideology: Hindutva; Assamese nationalism; National conservatism; Economic liberalism; Right-wing populism; Anti-immigration
- Political position: Far-right
- Colours: Saffron
- Slogan: Eight States. One Force.
- Alliance: National Democratic Alliance; North East Democratic Alliance
- Seats in Rajya Sabha: 4 / 7
- Seats in Lok Sabha: 10 / 14
- Seats in Assam Legislative Assembly: 82 / 126

Election symbol
- Lotus

Party flag

Website
- assam.bjp.org

The Bharatiya Janata Party – Assam (BJP - Assam) is the state unit of the Bharatiya Janata Party of the Assam. Its head office is situated at the 'Atal Bihari Vajpayee Bhawan' Near Hengrabari L.P. School Hengrabari, Guwahati-781 036, Assam, India. The current president of BJP Assam is Dilip Saikia.

In 2016, BJP formed government at Assam state for the first time under the leadership of Sarbananda Sonowal. It is still a ruling party and had two Chief Ministers till date: Sarbananda Sonowal from 2016 to 2021 and Himanta Biswa Sarma from 2021–present.

== Electoral performance ==
=== Lok Sabha election ===
Year	Seats won	+/-	Outcome
1991	2 / 14	▲2	Opposition
1996	1 / 14	▼1	Government, later Opposition
1998	1 / 14	Steady	Government
1999	2 / 14	▲1	Government
2004	2 / 14	Steady	Opposition
2009	5 / 14	▲3	Opposition
2014	7 / 14	▲2	Government
2019	9 / 14	▲2	Government
2024	9 / 14	Steady	Government

=== Legislative Assembly election ===
Year	Seats won	+/-	Voteshare (%)	+/- (%)	Outcome
1991	10 / 126	Steady	6.55%	Steady	Opposition
1996	4 / 126	▼6	10.41%	▲3.86%	Opposition
2001	8 / 126	▲4	9.35%	▼1.06%	Opposition
2006	10 / 126	▲2	11.98%	▲2.63%	Opposition
2011	0 / 126	▼10	11.47%	▼0.51%	Opposition
2016	60 / 126	▲55	29.5%	▲18.03%	Government
2021	60 / 126	Steady	33.21%	▲3.70%	Government
2026	82 / 126	▲22	37.81%	▲4.6%	Government

== Leadership ==
=== Chief ministers ===
#	Portrait	Name	Constituency	Term of office			Assembly
1		Sarbananda Sonowal	Majuli	24 May 2016	10 May 2021	4 years, 351 days	14th
2		Himanta Biswa Sarma	Jalukbari	10 May 2021	Incumbent	5 years, 183 days	15th and 16th

=== Presidents ===
#	Portrait	Name	Term of office		
1		Umanath Sarma	1980	1983	3 years
2		Lakheswar Gohain	1983	1985	2 years
3		Chakreswar Saikia	1985	1987	2 years
4		Jogeswar Mahanta	1987	1989	2 years
5		Prabin Baruah	1989	1995	6 years
6		Indramoni Bora	1995	1997	2 years
7		Narayan Chandra Borkataky			
8		Rajen Gohain			
(6)		Indramoni Bora	19-Oct-2003	2006	3 years
9		Ramen Deka	2006	2010	4 years
10		Ranjit Dutta	2010	2012	2 years
11		Sarbananda Sonowal	9-Nov-2012	16-Aug-2014	1 year, 280 days
12		Siddhartha Bhattacharya	16-Aug-2014	21-Nov-2015	1 year, 97 days
13		Sarbananda Sonowal	21-Nov-2015	16-Dec-2016	1 year, 25 days
14		Ranjeet Kumar Dass	16-Dec-2016	26-Jun-2021	4 years, 192 days
15		Bhabesh Kalita	26-Jun-2021	16-Jan-2025	3 years, 204 days
16		Dilip Saikia	16-Jan-2025	present	1 year, 297 days

== See also ==
- Asom Gana Parishad
- United People's Party Liberal
- Bodoland People's Front
- National Democratic Alliance
- North East Democratic Alliance
- Bharatiya Janata Party
- Meghalaya Democratic Alliance
- People's Democratic Alliance, Nagaland
- Bharatiya Janata Party – Gujarat
- Bharatiya Janata Party – Uttar Pradesh
- Bharatiya Janata Party – Madhya Pradesh
- State units of the Bharatiya Janata Party
