= Organisation of the Bharatiya Janata Party =

Structure of Bharatiya Janata Party

The organisation of the Bharatiya Janata Party is based upon the Constitution of the Bharatiya Janata Party. The organisation is strictly hierarchical, with the president being the highest authority in the party. The party is considered to be a cadre-based party that draws from the Hindutva-based ideology of its parent organisation, the Rashtriya Swayamsevak Sangh.

As of 2019, it is the country's largest political party in terms of representation in the national parliament and state assemblies and is the world's largest party in terms of primary membership.

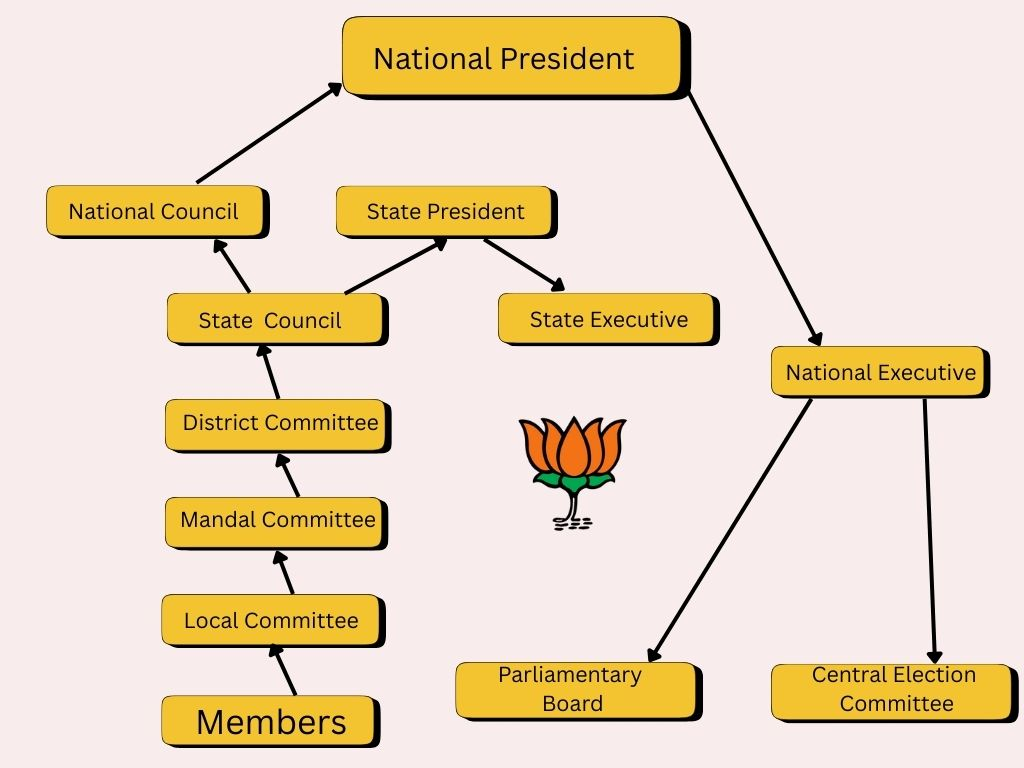
Organisational Structure of the Bharatiya Janata Party

== Parent organisation ==
BJP also draws its membership from the organisation of the Sangh Parivar.

== Departments ==
The BJP on the national level has several publicly known internal departments, such as:

- Good Governance
- Policy Research
- Media
- Media Relations
- Training
- Political Feedback and Response
- National Programs and Meetings
- Documentation and Library
- Sahayog and Disaster Relief Service
- President Office Tours and Programs
- Publicity Literature
- Coordination of Trusts
- Election Management
- Election Commission
- Legal Affairs
- Party Journals and Publications
- IT, Website and Social Media Management
- Foreign Affairs

The BJP does not publicly release more information about these departments aside from their respective heads.

== National level ==
=== National President ===
The organisation of the BJP is strictly hierarchical, with the president being the highest authority in the party. According to the party's constitution, the president is elected by an electoral college consisting of the National Council and the State Councils. Until 2012, the BJP constitution mandated that any qualified member could be national or state president for a single three-year term. This was amended to a maximum of two consecutive terms.

=== National Executive ===
The National Executive of Bharatiya Janata Party is the presidium and chief executive body of the Bharatiya Janata Party setting the overall strategic direction of the party and policy development. It is composed of members appointed by the BJP president and can have as many as 120 members.

Below the president is the National Executive of the Bharatiya Janata Party, which contains a variable number of senior leaders from across the country appointed by the President of the party. It is the higher decision-making body of the party. It consists of several office holders of the party, including up to seven vice-presidents, up to five general secretaries, one general secretary (organisation), one treasurer and up to seven secretaries who work directly with the president.

The National Executive has the authority to interpret the Articles and Rules of the party constitution. The Executive can also amend, alter and add to the party constitution which is subject to rectification by the following Plenary Session or Special Session of National Council. The National Executive also oversees the internal elections to the President and the National Council and appoints a returning officer for conducting the triennial election of the party.

An identical structure, with a State Executive Committee led by a State President, exists at the state level.

=== Parliamentary Board ===
The Parliamentary Board is the governing body of the BJP which takes day-to-day decisions on behalf of the National Executive. The National Executive sets up a Parliamentary Board consisting of Party President and ten other members. The Parliamentary Board supervises the activities of the parliamentary and legislative groups of the Party. It guides and regulates all the organisational units under the National Executive.

S.No	Member
1.	Nitin Nabin
2.	Narendra Modi
3.	Rajnath Singh
4.	Amit Shah
5.	Jagat Prakash Nadda
6.	B. S. Yediyurappa
7.	Sarbananda Sonowal
8.	K. Laxman
9.	Iqbal Singh Lalpura
10.	Sudha Yadav
11.	Satyanarayan Jatiya
12.	B. L. Santhosh

=== Central Election Committee ===
The Central Election Committee, is also set up by the National Executive, and consist of the 11 members of the Parliamentary Board and 8 other members (Note: Currently the Central Election Committee has only 4 members other than the 11 members of the Parliamentary Board) elected by the National Executive. The role of the CEC is to select candidates for all Legislative and Parliamentary elections throughout India.

S.No	Member
1.	Nitin Nabin
2.	Narendra Modi
3.	Rajnath Singh
4.	Amit Shah
5.	Jagat Prakash Nadda
6.	B. S. Yediyurappa
7.	Sarbananda Sonowal
8.	K. Laxman
9.	Iqbal Singh Lalpura
10.	Sudha Yadav
11.	Satyanarayan Jatiya
12.	B. L. Santhosh
13.	Bhupender Yadav
14.	Devendra Fadnavis
15.	Vanathi Srinivasan

=== National Council ===
The National Council is the highest policy making body of the party. It is also responsible for rectification of any amendment, alteration and addition to the party constitution by National Executive in the following Plenary Session or Special Session. The National Council along with the State Council also elects the President every three year. The National Council consists of members that are elected by the State Councils, 10% of the parliamentary party, former national Presidents, leaders of state legislative assemblies and state legislative councils, members nominated by the national president, all members of the National Executive, presidents of Morchas and Cells.

== State level ==
This is a list of the official state and territorial units of the Bharatiya Janata Party.

State/UT	Unit	Seats in Lok Sabha	Seats in Rajya Sabha	Seats in State Legislative Assemblies	Seats in State Legislative Councils
India	BJP National Council	240 / 543 (1 Vacant)	Elected 113 / 233 (1 Vacant) Nominated 5 / 12	1,656 / 4,126	165 / 426
State Units of the Bharatiya Janata Party
Andhra Pradesh	BJP Andhra Pradesh	3 / 25	2 / 11	8 / 175	Elected 2 / 50 Nominated 0 / 8
Arunachal Pradesh	BJP Arunachal Pradesh	2 / 2	1 / 1	46 / 60	
Assam	BJP Assam	9 / 14	4 / 7	82 / 126	
Bihar	BJP Bihar	12 / 40	7 / 16	89 / 243	Elected 18 / 63 Nominated 6 / 12
Chhattisgarh	BJP Chhattisgarh	10 / 11	2 / 5	54 / 90	
Goa	BJP Goa	1 / 2	1 / 1	27 / 40	
Gujarat	BJP Gujarat	25 / 26	11 / 11	162 / 182	
Haryana	BJP Haryana	5 / 10	3 / 5	48 / 90	
Himachal Pradesh	BJP Himachal Pradesh	4 / 4	2 / 3	28 / 68	
Jharkhand	BJP Jharkhand	8 / 14	3 / 6	21 / 81	
Karnataka	BJP Karnataka	17 / 28	5 / 12	63 / 224	Elected 26 / 64 Nominated 3 / 11
Kerala	BJP Kerala	1 / 20	0 / 9	3 / 140	
Madhya Pradesh	BJP Madhya Pradesh	29 / 29	9 / 11	166 / 230	
Maharashtra	BJP Maharashtra	9 / 48	8 / 19	131 / 288	Elected 19 / 66 Nominated 3 / 12
Manipur	BJP Manipur	0 / 2	1 / 1	37 / 60	
Meghalaya	BJP Meghalaya	0 / 2	0 / 1	2 / 60	
Mizoram	BJP Mizoram	0 / 1	0 / 1	2 / 40	
Nagaland	BJP Nagaland	0 / 1	1 / 1	11 / 60	
Odisha	BJP Odisha	20 / 21	4 / 10	79 / 147	
Punjab	BJP Punjab	0 / 13	6 / 7	2 / 117	
Rajasthan	BJP Rajasthan.	14 / 25	5 / 10	119 / 200	
Sikkim	BJP Sikkim	0 / 1	1 / 1	0 / 32	
Tamil Nadu	BJP Tamil Nadu	0 / 39	0 / 18	1 / 234	
Telangana	BJP Telangana	8 / 17	0 / 7	8 / 119	Elected 3 / 34 Nominated 0 / 6
Tripura	BJP Tripura	2 / 2	1 / 1	32 / 60	
Uttar Pradesh	BJP Uttar Pradesh	33 / 80	24 / 31	258 / 403	Elected 71 / 90 Nominated 8 / 10
Uttarakhand	BJP Uttarakhand	5 / 5	3 / 3	47 / 70	
West Bengal	BJP West Bengal	12 / 42	3 / 16	207 / 294	
Territorial Units of the Bharatiya Janata Party
Andaman and Nicobar Islands	BJP Andaman and Nicobar	1 / 1			
Chandigarh	BJP Chandigarh	0 / 1			
Dadra and Nagar Haveli and Daman and Diu	BJP Dadra and Nagar Haveli and Daman and Diu	1 / 2			
Delhi	BJP Delhi	7 / 7	1 / 3	48 / 70	
Jammu and Kashmir	BJP Jammu and Kashmir	2 / 5	1 / 4	29 / 90	
Ladakh	BJP Ladakh	0 / 1			
Lakshadweep	BJP Lakshadweep	0 / 1			
Puducherry	BJP Puducherry	0 / 1	1 / 1	Elected 4 / 30 Nominated 3 / 3	

=== District Committee ===
District Committee is an important grassroots level organisation of BJP with one President, Six Vice President and Four General Secretary and Six Secretaries. The District Committee has Other members also.

=== Mandal Committee ===
The Mandal Committee of BJP has one president with two general secretary and four secretaries

== Morchas ==
List of morchas (frontal wings) of the Bharatiya Janata Party
Morcha	President	Details
Mahila Morcha	Rupkumari Choudhary	Women's wing of the Bharatiya Janata Party.
Yuva Morcha	Hemang Joshi	Youth wing of the Bharatiya Janata Party.
Kisan Sangh	Bansilal Gurjar	Farmer wing of the Bharatiya Janata Party.
Mazdoor Sangh	Hiranmay Pandya	Labour wing of the Bharatiya Janata Party.
SC Morcha	Shivesh Kumar	Scheduled Caste wing of the Bharatiya Janata Party.
ST Morcha	Manna Lal Rawat	Scheduled Tribe wing of the Bharatiya Janata Party.
OBC Morcha	Amarpal Maurya	Other Backward Classes wing of the Bharatiya Janata Party.
Kunwar Basit Ali	Jamal Siddiqui	Minority wing of the Bharatiya Janata Party.
IT Cell	Deepak Mhaskey	Social media and digital outreach wing of the Bharatiya Janata Party.

=== International ===
Overseas Friends of BJP The Overseas Friends of BJP are various voluntary organisations operating in foreign countries under the foreign affairs department of the Bharatiya Janata Party. These organisations were first launched in 1991 and have since promoted the party and its governments abroad. They are present in over 25 countries including the United States, United Kingdom, Canada, and Israel, organising campaigns and outreach activities in support of the party.

== Membership ==
Any Indian citizen of the age of 18 years or above can become a member of the Party, provided that he is not a member of any other political party. The term of membership will ordinarily be of 6 years. As of 2019, it is the world's largest political party in terms of primary membership.

=== Membership oath ===
I believe in Integral Humanism which is the basic philosophy of the Bharatiya Janata Party. I am committed to Nationalism and National Integration, Democracy, Gandhian Socialism, Positive Secularism, (Sarva Dharma Sama Bhava) and value-based politics. I subscribe to the concept of a secular state and nation not based on religion. I firmly believe that this task can be achieved by peaceful means alone. I do not observe or recognize untouchability in any shape or form. I am not a member of any other political party. I undertake to abide by the Constitution, Rules and Discipline of the Party.

— Bharatiya Janata Party membership oath

== See also ==
- Sangh Parivar
- List of national presidents of the Bharatiya Janata Party
- Leader of the Bharatiya Janata Party in the Parliament of India
- List of state presidents of the Bharatiya Janata Party
- Pradesh Congress Committee
