= Bharatiya Janata Party – Mizoram =

Mizoram affiliate of the Bharatiya Janata Party

- Abbreviation: BJP
- President: K. Beichhua
- Founder: Atal Bihari Vajpayee; Lal Krishna Advani; Murli Manohar Joshi; Nanaji Deshmukh; K. R. Malkani; Sikandar Bakht; Vijay Kumar Malhotra; Vijaya Raje Scindia; Bhairon Singh Shekhawat; Shanta Kumar; Ram Jethmalani; Jagannathrao Joshi
- Founded: 6 April 1980 (46 years ago)
- Split from: Janata Party
- Preceded by: Bharatiya Jana Sangh (1951–1977); Janata Party (1977–1980)
- Headquarters: Venghlui, T/82, Aizawl-796 001, Mizoram, India
- Newspaper: Kamal Sandesh
- Youth wing: Bharatiya Janata Yuva Morcha
- Women's wing: BJP Mahila Morcha
- Labour wing: Bharatiya Mazdoor Sangh
- Peasant's wing: Bharatiya Kisan Sangh
- Ideology: Integral humanism; Social conservatism; Economic nationalism Majority Secularism Cultural nationalism Faction Buddhist rights (Chakma) Hindu rights
- Colours: Saffron
- Alliance: National Level; National Democratic Alliance; Regional level North East Democratic Alliance
- Seats in Rajya Sabha: 0 / 1
- Seats in Lok Sabha: 0 / 1
- Seats in Mizoram Legislative Assembly: 2 / 40

Election symbol
- Lotus

Party flag

Website
- www.bjp.org/mizoram

The Bharatiya Janata Party – Mizoram (pronounced [bʱaːɾ(ə)ˈtiːjə dʒən(ə)ˈtaː ˈpaːrʈiː]; lit. 'Indian People's Party'), or simply, BJP Mizoram (BJP), is the state unit of the Bharatiya Janata Party of the Mizoram. Its head office is situated at the Venghlui, T/82, Aizawl-796 001, Mizoram, India.

== In General Election ==
In General Elections
Year	Party leader	Photo	Seats won	Change in seats	Result
2024	Vanlalhmuaka		0	0	Government
2019	Nirupam Chakma		0	0	Government
2014			0	0	Government
2009			0	0	Opposition
2004	Supported to MNF				Opposition
1999			0	0	Government
1998	P. L. Chhuma		0	0	Government
1996	Supported to MNF				Government, later Opposition
1991	Supported to MNF				Opposition
1989	Supported to MNF				Opposition
1984	Supported to MNF				Opposition

== In State Election ==
Year	Election	Seats won	Change of Seats	Popular votes	Vote%	Change of Vote%	Result
1993	3rd Assembly (Mizoram)	0 / 40	new	10,004	3.11%	new	None
1998	4th Assembly (Mizoram)	0 / 40	0	8,448	2.50%	▼0.61%	None
2003	5th Assembly (Mizoram)	0 / 40	0	7,823	1.87	▼0.63%	None
2008	6th Assembly (Mizoram)	0 / 40	0			▼	None
2013	7th Assembly (Mizoram)	0 / 40	0	2,139	0.87	▼	None
2018	8th Assembly (Mizoram)	1 / 40	▲1	51,087	8.09%	▲7.6%	Allied Government with MNF, later Alliance broken at state level.
2023	9th Assembly (Mizoram)	2 / 40	▲1	35,524	5.06%	▼3.03%	Others

== In Local elections ==
=== Municipal corporation election results ===
Year	Municipal Corporation	Seats contested	Seats won	Change in seats	Percentage of votes	Vote swing
Mizoram
2026	Aizawl	11	0 / 19	0		
2021	Aizawl	9	0 / 19	0		
2015	Aizawl	15(along with ZNP)	0 / 19			

=== Autonomous District Council election ===
Year	Autonomous District Council	Seats contested	Seats won	Change in seats	Percentage of votes	Vote swing	Government
Kamalanagar
2023	Chakma Autonomous District Council	20	5 / 20				Opposition, later government
2018	Chakma Autonomous District Council	20	5 / 20				Opposition, later government again opposition
Lawngtlai
2025	Lai Autonomous District Council	10	2 / 25	▲1			Others
2020	Lai Autonomous District Council	17	1 / 25	▲1			Government
2015	Lai Autonomous District Council		0 / 25				None.
Siaha
2022	Mara Autonomous District Council	24	12 / 25	▲12			Opposition, later government.
2017	Mara Autonomous District Council		0 / 25				None.

== See also ==
- Buddha Dhan Chakma
- Bharatiya Janata Party
- National Democratic Alliance
- North East Democratic Alliance
- Mizo National Front
- Zoram People's Movement
- Organisation of the Bharatiya Janata Party
