= Bharatiya Janata Party – Nagaland =

Nagaland affiliate of the Bharatiya Janata Party

- Abbreviation: BJP
- Leader: Yanthungo Patton (Deputy Chief Minister of Nagaland)
- President: Benjamin Yepthomi
- General Secretary: Sunep C Jamir and Manai konyak
- Treasurer: Kamal Jain
- Founder: Atal Bihari Vajpayee; Lal Krishna Advani; Murli Manohar Joshi; Nanaji Deshmukh; K. R. Malkani; Sikandar Bakht; Vijay Kumar Malhotra; Vijaya Raje Scindia; Bhairon Singh Shekhawat; Shanta Kumar; Ram Jethmalani; Jagannathrao Joshi
- Founded: 6 April 1980 (46 years ago)
- Split from: Janata Party
- Preceded by: Bharatiya Jana Sangh (1951–1977); Janata Party (1977–1980)
- Headquarters: 1st Floor, Aiko Building, Opp. Town Hall, Bank Colony, Dimapur, 797112, Nagaland, India
- Newspaper: Kamal Sandesh
- Youth wing: Bharatiya Janata Yuva Morcha
- Women's wing: BJP Mahila Morcha
- Labour wing: Bharatiya Mazdoor Sangh
- Peasant's wing: Bharatiya Kisan Sangh
- Ideology: Integral humanism; Secularism; Social conservatism; Economic nationalism Majority; Cultural nationalism
- Colours: Saffron
- Alliance: National level National Democratic Alliance; NorthEast Region; North East Democratic Alliance; Nagaland; United Democratic Alliance
- Seats in Rajya Sabha: 1 / 1 (as of 2022)
- Seats in Lok Sabha: 0 / 1 (as of 2022)
- Seats in Nagaland Legislative Assembly Seats in Nagaland Urban Local Bodies: 12 / 60 (as of 2022) 25 / 278 (as of 2024)

Election symbol
- Lotus

Party flag

Website
- www.bjp.org/nagaland-state-office

The Bharatiya Janata Party – Nagaland (pronounced [bʱaːɾ(ə)ˈtiːjə dʒən(ə)ˈtaː ˈpaːrʈiː]; lit. 'Indian People's Party'), or simply BJP Nagaland (BJP), is the state unit of the Bharatiya Janata Party of Nagaland. Its state head office is located at H.No. 235, Upper Agri, Kohima, Nagaland, India. The current president of BJP Nagaland is Benjamin Yepthomi.

== Rajya Sabha members ==
Name	Photo	Date of appointment	Date of retirement
S. Phangnon Konyak		03/04/2022	02/04/2028

== In General Election ==
In General Elections
Year	Party leader	Seats contested	Seats won	Change in seats	Result
2024	Not contested but supported to NDPP				Government
2019	Not contested but supported to NDPP				Government
2014	Not contested but supported to NPF				Government
2009	Not contested but supported to NPF				Opposition
2004	Not contested but supported to NPF				Opposition
1999		1	0	0	Government
1998	Not contested				Government
1996	Not contested				Government, later Opposition
1991		1	0	0	Opposition
1989	Not contested				Opposition
1984	Not contested				Opposition

== In State Election ==
Year	Election	Seats won	Change of Seats	Popular votes	Vote%	Change of Vote%	Result
1993	8th Assembly (Nagaland)	0 / 60	new	3,755	0.51%	new	None
1998	9th Assembly (Nagaland)	Not contested					
2003	10th Assembly (Nagaland)	7 / 60	▲7	96,658	11.98%	-	Allied Government with NPF
2008	11th Assembly (Nagaland)	2 / 60	▼5	96,658	8.27%	▼2.61%	Allied Government with NPF
2013	12th Assembly (Nagaland)	1 / 60	▼1	19,121	1.8%	▼3.6%	Allied Government with NPF
2018	13th Assembly (Nagaland)	12 / 60	▲11	153,864	15.3%	▲13.5%	Allied Government with NDPP and NPF
2023	14th Assembly (Nagaland)	12 / 60	Steady	215,336	18.81%	▲3.51%	Allied Government with NDPP, later NPF

== List of Deputy Chief Ministers ==
No	Portrait	Name	Constituency	Term of office			Assembly	Chief minister
1		Yanthungo Patton	Tyüi	13 December 2023	Incumbent	8 years, 143 days		Neiphiu Rio

== See also ==
- Bharatiya Janata Party
- National Democratic Alliance
- North East Democratic Alliance
- Naga People's Front
- Nationalist Democratic Progressive Party
- United Democratic Alliance
