= Bharatiya Janata Party – Manipur =

Manipur affiliate of the Bharatiya Janata Party

Bharatiya Janata Party – Manipur ꯚꯥꯔꯇꯤꯌ ꯖꯅꯇꯥ ꯄꯥꯔꯇꯤ – ꯃꯅꯤꯄꯨꯔꯗꯥ ꯂꯩꯕꯥ
- Abbreviation: BJP
- Leader: Yumnam Khemchand Singh (Chief minister)
- President: Adhikarimayum Sharda Devi
- General Secretary: Shri Abhay kumar Giri
- Founder: Atal Bihari Vajpayee; Lal Krishna Advani; Murli Manohar Joshi; Nanaji Deshmukh; K. R. Malkani; Sikandar Bakht; Vijay Kumar Malhotra; Vijaya Raje Scindia; Bhairon Singh Shekhawat; Shanta Kumar; Ram Jethmalani; Jagannathrao Joshi
- Founded: 6 April 1980 (46 years ago)
- Split from: Janata Party
- Preceded by: Bharatiya Jana Sangh (1951–1977); Janata Party (1977–1980)
- Headquarters: Nitaipai Chuthak, Keishamthong, Imphal, Manipur, 795004
- Newspaper: Kamal Sandesh
- Youth wing: Bharatiya Janata Yuva Morcha
- Women's wing: BJP Mahila Morcha
- Labour wing: Bharatiya Mazdoor Sangh
- Peasant's wing: Bharatiya Kisan Sangh
- Ideology: Integral humanism; Social conservatism; Economic nationalism; Hindu nationalism; Cultural nationalism; Faction: Ethnocentrism
- Colours: Saffron
- Alliance: National Democratic Alliance; North East Democratic Alliance
- Seats in Rajya Sabha: 1 / 1
- Seats in Lok Sabha: 0 / 2
- Seats in Manipur Legislative Assembly: 37 / 60

Election symbol
- Lotus

Party flag

Website
- www.bjp.org/manipur

The Bharatiya Janata Party – Manipur (pronounced [bʱaːɾ(ə)ˈtiːjə dʒən(ə)ˈtaː ˈpaːrʈiː]; lit. 'Indian People's Party'), or simply BJP Manipur (BJP), is the state unit of the Bharatiya Janata Party of the Manipur. Its head office is situated at Nitaipai Chuthak, Keishamthong, Imphal, Manipur, 795004, India. The current president of BJP Manipur is Adhikarimayum Sharda Devi.

== Electoral performance ==
=== Lok Sabha Election ===
Year	Seats won	+/-	Outcome
1999	1 / 2	–	Government
2004	0 / 2	▼1	Opposition
2009	0 / 2	–	Opposition
2014	0 / 2	–	Government
2019	1 / 2	▲1	Government
2024	0 / 2	▼1	Government

=== Legislative Assembly Election ===
Year	Seats won	+/-	Voteshare (%)	+/- (%)	Outcome
1984	0 / 60	New	0.71%	New	None
1995	1 / 60	▲1	3.28%	▲2.57%	Opposition
2000	6 / 60	▲5	11.28%	▲8%	Opposition
2002	4 / 60	▼2	9.55%	▼1.73%	Opposition
2007	0 / 60	▼4	0.85%	▼8.7%	None
2012	0 / 60	0	2.1%	▲1.25%	None
2017	21 / 60	▲21	36.3%	▲34.2%	Government
2022	32 / 60	▲11	37.83%	▲2.73%	Government

== Leadership ==
=== Chief ministers ===
No.	Portrait	Name	Constituency	Term of office			Assembly
1		N. Biren Singh	Heignang	15 March 2017	20 March 2022	7 years, 335 days	12th
1		N. Biren Singh	Heignang	21 March 2022	13 February 2025	7 years, 335 days	13th
2		Y. Khemchand Singh		4 February 2026	Incumbent	248 days	13th

=== Rajya Sabha members ===
No	Name	Constituency	From	To
1	Leishemba Sanajaoba	Manipur	22/06/2020	21/06/2026
2	Adhikarimayum Sharda Devi	Manipur	22/06/2026	21/06/2032

=== Lok Sabha members 2019 ===
No	Name	Constituency	Votes
1	Rajkumar Ranjan Singh	Inner Manipur	2,63,632

== See also ==
- Bharatiya Janata Party
- National Democratic Alliance
- North East Democratic Alliance
- National People's Party
- Naga People's Front
- Kuki People's Alliance
