= Bharatiya Janata Party – Meghalaya =

Meghalaya affiliate of the Bharatiya Janata Party

- Abbreviation: BJP
- Leader: Sanbor Shullai
- President: Rikman Momin
- Founder: Atal Bihari Vajpayee; Lal Krishna Advani; Murli Manohar Joshi; Nanaji Deshmukh; K. R. Malkani; Sikandar Bakht; Vijay Kumar Malhotra; Vijaya Raje Scindia; Bhairon Singh Shekhawat; Shanta Kumar; Ram Jethmalani; Jagannathrao Joshi
- Founded: 6 April 1980 (46 years ago)
- Split from: Janata Party
- Preceded by: Bharatiya Jana Sangh (1951–1977); Janata Party (1977–1980)
- Headquarters: 3rd Floor, Opp.Passport Seva Kendra Lower Lachumiere, Shillong-793 001, Meghalaya
- Newspaper: Kamal Sandesh
- Youth wing: Bharatiya Janata Yuva Morcha
- Women's wing: BJP Mahila Morcha
- Labour wing: Bharatiya Mazdoor Sangh
- Peasant's wing: Bharatiya Kisan Sangh
- Ideology: Hindutva; National conservatism; Hindu nationalism; Neoliberalism
- Colours: Saffron
- Alliance: National level National Democratic Alliance; Regional level North East Democratic Alliance; State level Meghalaya Democratic Alliance
- Seats in Rajya Sabha: 0 / 1 (as of 2023)
- Seats in Lok Sabha: 0 / 2 (as of 2023)
- Seats in Meghalaya Legislative Assembly: 10 / 60 (as of 2023)

Election symbol
- Lotus

Party flag

Website
- www.bjp.org/meghalaya

The Bharatiya Janata Party – Meghalaya (pronounced [bʱaːɾ(ə)ˈtiːjə dʒən(ə)ˈtaː ˈpaːrʈiː]; lit. 'Indian People's Party'), or simply BJP Meghalaya (BJP), is the state unit of the Bharatiya Janata Party of Meghalaya. Its head office is situated at the 3rd Floor, Opp.Passport Seva Kendra Lower Lachumiere, Shillong-793 001, Meghalaya India. The current president of BJP Meghalaya is Rikman Momin.

== In General Election ==
In General Elections
Year	Party leader	Photo	Seats won	Change in seats	Result
2024			0	0	Government
2019	Sanbor Shullai		0	0	Government
2014	Shibun Lyngdoh		0	0	Government
2009			0	0	Opposition
2004			0	0	Opposition
1999			0	0	Government
1998			0	0	Government
1996			0	0	Government, later Opposition
1991			0	0	Opposition
1989			0	0	Opposition
1984			0	new	Opposition

== In State Election ==
Year	Election	Seats won	Change of Seats	Popular votes	Vote%	Change of Vote%	Result
1993	4th Assembly (Meghalaya)	0 / 60	new	29,948	3.68%	new	None
1998	5th Assembly (Meghalaya)	3 / 60	▲3	41,924	5.01%	▲1.33%	Opposition
2003	7th Assembly (Meghalaya)	2 / 60	▼1	48,932	5.42%	▲0.41%	Opposition
2008	8th Assembly (Meghalaya)	1 / 60	▼1	29,465	2.71%	▼2.71%	Opposition
2013	9th Assembly (Meghalaya)	0 / 60	▼1	16,752	1.27%	▼1.44%	None
2018	10th Assembly (Meghalaya)	2 / 60	▲2	152,162	9.6%	▲8.33%	Allied Government MDA
2023	11th Assembly (Meghalaya)	2 / 60	Steady	173,042	9.30%	▼0.30%	Allied Government MDA

== In Local Elections ==
=== Autonomous District Council election ===
Year	Autonomous District Council	Seats contested	Seats won	Change in seats	Percentage of votes	Vote swing	Government
Garo Hills
2021	Garo Hills	21	2 / 29	▲1			Allied government of MDA
2015	Garo Hills	6	1 / 29				Allied government of NEDA
Jaintia Hills
2021	Jaintia Hills		0 / 29	0			MDA Government of BJP Allies.
2015	Jaintia Hills		0 / 29				NEDA Government of BJP Allies.
Khasi Hills
2021	Kashi Hills		0 / 29	0			MDA Government of BJP Allies.
2015	Khasi Hills		0 / 29				

== See also ==
- Bharatiya Janata Party
- National Democratic Alliance
- North East Democratic Alliance
- Meghalaya Democratic Alliance
- National People's Party
- United Democratic Party
- People's Democratic Front
- Hill State People's Democratic Party
- Organisation of the Bharatiya Janata Party
