= Bharatiya Janata Party – Haryana =

Political party in north-west India

- Leader: Nayab Singh Saini (Chief Minister)
- President: Dr Archana Gupta
- General Secretary: Phanindra Nath Sharma
- Founder: Atal Bihari Vajpayee; Lal Krishna Advani; Murli Manohar Joshi; Nanaji Deshmukh; K. R. Malkani; Sikandar Bakht; Vijay Kumar Malhotra; Vijaya Raje Scindia; Bhairon Singh Shekhawat; Shanta Kumar; Ram Jethmalani; Jagannathrao Joshi
- Founded: 6 April 1980 (46 years ago)
- Headquarters: 30, H.U.D.A. Complex, Rohtak, Haryana
- Colours: Saffron
- Seats in Rajya Sabha: 4 / 5
- Seats in Lok Sabha: 5 / 10
- Seats in Haryana Legislative Assembly: 48 / 90

Election symbol
- Lotus

Party flag

Website
- www.bjpharyana.org

Bharatiya Janata Party – Haryana (or BJP Haryana) is a state unit of the Bharatiya Janata Party in Haryana. Nayab Singh Saini is the current president of the BJP, Haryana. Manohar Lal Khattar became the BJP's first Chief Minister of Haryana after his swearing-in ceremony on 26 October 2014. On 27 October 2019, Khattar was sworn in as the chief minister for the second time, after making an alliance with Dushyant Chautala's Jannayak Janta Party after the 2019 Haryana Legislative Assembly election.

In the 2024 Haryana Legislative Assembly election, the Bharatiya Janata Party (BJP) secured another decisive victory, winning 48 seats and achieving a clear majority. This marks the party's third consecutive triumph in Haryana, led by Nayab Singh Saini.

== Bhajpa Ki Baat ==
Bharatiya Janata Party – Haryana
- Editor: Pawan Pandit
- Country: India
- Based in: Haryana, India
- Language: Hindi; English
- Website: www.bhajpakibaat.org

Bhajpa Ki Baat is a predominantly Indian political news website and magazine. It is the official magazine of the Bharatiya Janata Party. Its first edition was published on 1 October 2000 from the state unit office under the editorial board of Rattan Lal Kataria, Manohar Lal Khattar & O. P. Dhankar. Pawan Pandit is currently serving as the editor-in-chief from 2020.

=== First editorial board ===
Years	Name	portrait
2000–2003	Rattan Lal Kataria	
2000–2010	Manohar Lal Khattar	
2002–2003	O. P. Dhankar	

== Electoral history ==
=== Lok Sabha election ===
Year	Seats won	+/-	Outcome
1980	0 / 10	steady	Opposition
1984	0 / 10	steady	Opposition
1989	0 / 10	steady	Outside support to National Front
1991	0 / 10	steady	Opposition
1996	4 / 10	▲4	Government, later Opposition
1998	1 / 10	▼3	Government
1999	5 / 10	▲4	Government
2004	1 / 10	▼4	Opposition
2009	0 / 10	▼1	Opposition
2014	7 / 10	▲7	Government
2019	10 / 10	▲3	Government
2024	5 / 10	▼5	Government

=== Legislative Assembly election ===
Year	Seats won	Seats contested	+/-	Voteshare (%)	+/- (%)	Outcome
1982	6 / 90	24	▲6	7.67%	▲7.67%	Opposition
1987	16 / 90	20	▲10	10.08%	▲2.41%	Government
1991	2 / 90	89	▼14	9.43%	▼0.65%	Opposition
1996	11 / 90	25	▲9	8.88%	▼0.55%	Government
2000	6 / 90	29	▼5	8.94%	▲0.06%	Opposition
2005	2 / 90	90	▼4	10.36%	▲1.42%	Opposition
2009	4 / 90	90	▲2	9.04%	▲1.32%	Opposition
2014	47 / 90	90	▲43	33.20%	▲24.16%	Government
2019	40 / 90	90	▼7	36.49%	▲3.29%	Government
2024	48 / 90	89	▲8	39.94%	▲3.45%	Government

== Leadership ==
=== Chief Minister ===
#	Portrait	Name	Constituency	Term of Office		Tenure	Assembly
1		Manohar Lal Khattar	Karnal	26 October 2014	27 October 2019	9 years, 138 days	13th
1		Manohar Lal Khattar	Karnal	27 October 2019	12 March 2024	9 years, 138 days	14th
2		Nayab Singh Saini	Karnal	12 March 2024	17 October 2024	2 years, 212 days	14th
2		Nayab Singh Saini	Ladwa	17 October 2024	Incumbent	2 years, 212 days	15th

=== President ===
#	Portrait	Name	Period		
1		Kamla Verma	1980	1983	3 years
2		Suraj Bhan	1984	1985	1 year
3		Mangal Sein	1986	1990	4 years
4		Ram Bilas Sharma	1990	1993	3 years
5		Ramesh Joshi	1994	1998	4 years
6		Om Prakash Grover	1998	2000	2 years
7		Rattan Lal Kataria	2000	2003	3 years
8		Ganeshi Lal	30 October 2003	19 November 2006	3 years, 20 days
9		Atme Prakash Manchanda	19 November 2006	9 July 2009	2 years, 232 days
10		Krishan Pal Gurjar	9 July 2009	5 January 2013	3 years, 180 days
(4)		Ram Bilas Sharma	5 January 2013	26 November 2014	1 year, 325 days
11		Subhash Barala	26 November 2014	19 July 2020	5 years, 236 days
12		Om Prakash Dhankar	19 July 2020	28 October 2023	3 years, 101 days
13		Nayab Singh Saini	28 October 2023	9 July 2024	255 days
14.		Mohan Lal Badoli	9 July 2024	28 May 2026	1 year, 323 days
15.		Dr. Archana Gupta	29 May 2026	Incumbent	134 days

== See also ==
- Bharatiya Janata Party – Gujarat
- Bharatiya Janata Party – Uttar Pradesh
- Bharatiya Janata Party – Madhya Pradesh
- State units of the Bharatiya Janata Party
- Bharatiya Janata Yuva Morcha, The youth wing of the BJP
