= Bharatiya Janata Party – Uttar Pradesh =

Uttar Pradesh affiliate of the Bharatiya Janata Party

Bharatiya Janata Party – Uttar Pradesh भारतीय जनता पार्टी - उत्तर प्रदेश
- Abbreviation: BJP
- Leader: Yogi Adityanath (Chief Minister)
- President: Pankaj Chaudhary
- General Secretary: Dharam Pal Singh
- Founder: Atal Bihari Vajpayee; Lal Krishna Advani; Murli Manohar Joshi; Nanaji Deshmukh; K. R. Malkani; Sikandar Bakht; Vijay Kumar Malhotra; Vijaya Raje Scindia; Bhairon Singh Shekhawat; Shanta Kumar; Ram Jethmalani; Jagannathrao Joshi
- Founded: 6 April 1980 (46 years ago)
- Headquarters: BJP Bhawan, 7, Vidhan Sabha Marg, Lucknow - 226 001, Uttar Pradesh
- Newspaper: Kamal Sandesh
- Youth wing: Bharatiya Janata Yuva Morcha
- Women's wing: BJP Mahila Morcha
- Ideology: Conservatism (Indian); Neoliberalism; Hindutva; Hindu nationalism; Right-wing populism
- Political position: Right-wing to far-right (Note: Sources:)
- Colours: Saffron
- ECI status: National Party
- Alliance: National Democratic Alliance
- Seats in Rajya Sabha: 25 / 31
- Seats in Lok Sabha: 33 / 80
- Seats in Uttar Pradesh Legislative Council: 79 / 100
- Seats in Uttar Pradesh Legislative Assembly: 258 / 403

Election symbol
- Lotus

Party flag
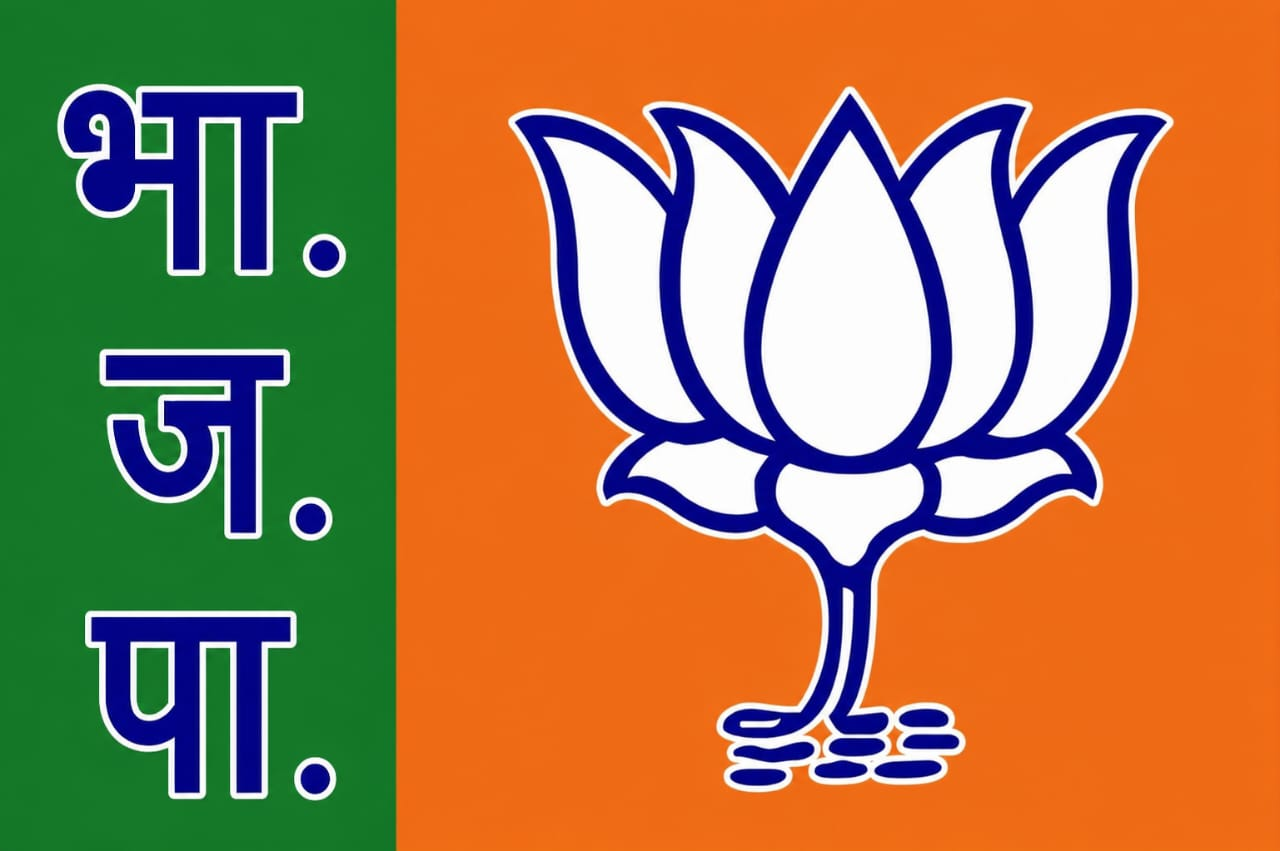
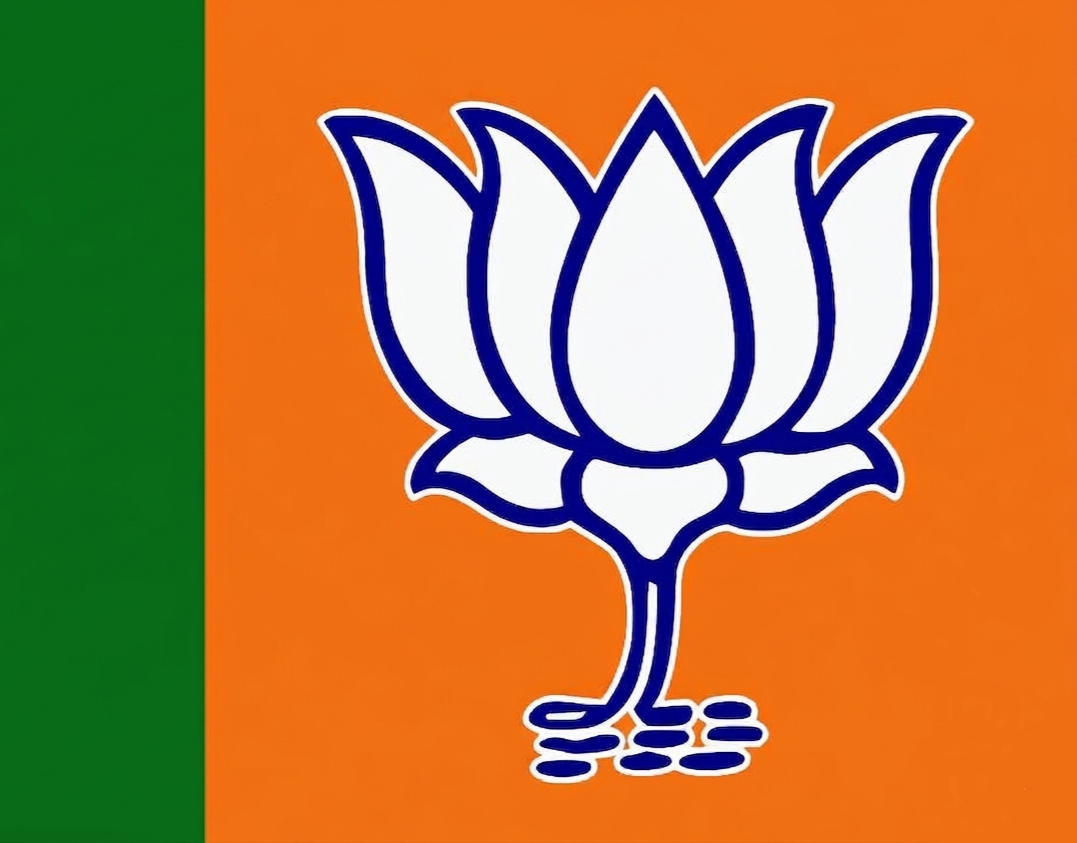

Website
- up.bjp.org

Bharatiya Janata Party – Uttar Pradesh, or, (BJP Uttar Pradesh) is the affiliate of Bharatiya Janata Party in the Indian state of Uttar Pradesh. Its head office is situated at the BJP Bhavan, 7, Vidhan Sabha Marg, Lucknow.

== Electoral history ==
=== Lok Sabha election ===
Year	Seats won	+/-	Outcome
Bharatiya Jana Sangh
1952	0 / 86	–	Opposition
1957	1 / 86	▲1	Opposition
1962	7 / 86	▲6	Opposition
1967	12 / 85	▲5	Opposition
1971	4 / 85	▼8	Opposition
Bharatiya Janata Party
1980	0 / 85	–	Opposition
1984	0 / 85	–	Opposition
1989	8 / 85	▲8	Outside support to JD
1991	51 / 85	▲43	Opposition
1996	52 / 85	▲1	Government, later Opposition
1998	59 / 85	▲7	Government
1999	29 / 85	▼30	Government
2004	10 / 80	▼19	Opposition
2009	10 / 80	–	Opposition
2014	71 / 80	▲61	Government
2019	62 / 80	▼9	Government
2024	33 / 80	▼29	Government

=== Vidhan Sabha election ===
Year	Seats won	+/-	Voteshare (%)	+/- (%)	Outcome
Bharatiya Jana Sangh
1952	2 / 430	▲2	6.45%	–	Opposition
1957	17 / 430	▲15	9.84%	▲3.39%	Opposition
1962	49 / 430	▲32	16.64%	▲6.80%	Opposition
1967	98 / 425	▲49	21.67%	▲5.03%	Opposition, later Government
1969	49 / 425	▼49	17.93%	▼3.74%	Opposition, later Government
1974	61 / 425	▲12	17.12%	▼0.81%	Opposition
Bharatiya Janata Party
1980	11 / 425	▲11	10.76%	–	Opposition
1985	16 / 425	▲5	9.83%	▼0.93%	Opposition
1989	57 / 425	▲41	11.61%	▲1.78%	Outside support to JD
1991	221 / 425	▲164	31.45%	▲19.84%	Government
1993	177 / 425	▼44	33.30%	▲1.85%	Opposition
1996	174 / 425	▼3	32.52%	▼0.48%	Government
2002	88 / 403	▼86	20.08%	▼12.44%	Government, later Opposition
2007	51 / 403	▼37	16.97%	▼3.11%	Opposition
2012	47 / 403	▼4	15%	▼1.97%	Opposition
2017	312 / 403	▲265	39.67%	▲24.67%	Government
2022	255 / 403	▼57	41.3%	▲1.63%	Government

== Leadership ==
=== List of BJP Chief Minister of Uttar Pradesh ===
S.No.	Portrait	Name (born /death)	Constituency	Term in office			Assembly
S.No.	Portrait	Name (born /death)	Constituency	Assumed office	Left office	Time in office	Assembly
BJP Chief Minister of Uttar Pradesh
1		Kalyan Singh (Born 5 Jan 1932 – Died 21 Aug 2021)	Atrauli	24 June 1991	6 December 1992	3 years, 217 days	11th
1		Kalyan Singh (Born 5 Jan 1932 – Died 21 Aug 2021)	Atrauli	21 September 1997	12 November 1999	3 years, 217 days	13th
2		Ram Prakash Gupta (Born 26 Oct 1923 – Died 1 May 2004)	MLC	12 November 1999	28 October 2000	351 days	13th
3		Rajnath Singh (Born 10 July 1951)	Haidergarh	28 October 2000	8 March 2002	1 year, 131 days	13th
4		Yogi Adityanath (Born 5 June 1972)	MLC	19 March 2017	25 March 2022	9 years, 152 days	17th
4		Yogi Adityanath (Born 5 June 1972)	Gorakhpur Urban	25 March 2022	Incumbent	9 years, 152 days	18th

=== List of deputy chief ministers of Uttar Pradesh ===
S.No.	Portrait	Name (born /death)	Constituency	Term in office			Assembly	Chief Ministers
S.No.	Portrait	Name (born /death)	Constituency	Assumed office	Left office	Time in office	Assembly	Chief Ministers
BJP Deputy Chief Ministers of Uttar Pradesh
1		Dinesh Sharma (Born 12 January 1964)	MLC	19 March 2017	25 March 2022	5 years, 6 days	17th	Yogi Adityanath
1		Keshav Prasad Maurya (Born 7 May 1969)	MLC	19 March 2017	25 March 2022	9 years, 152 days	17th	Yogi Adityanath
1		Keshav Prasad Maurya (Born 7 May 1969)	MLC	25 March 2022	Incumbent	9 years, 152 days	18th	Yogi Adityanath
2		Brajesh Pathak (Born 25 June 1964)	Lucknow Cantonment	25 March 2022	Incumbent	4 years, 146 days	18th	Yogi Adityanath

=== Leader of the Opposition in Uttar Pradesh Legislative Assembly ===
S.No.	Portrait	Name (born /death)	Constituency	Term in office			Assembly	Chief Ministers
S.No.	Portrait	Name (born /death)	Constituency	Assumed office	Left office	Time in office	Assembly	Chief Ministers
Leader of the Opposition in Uttar Pradesh Legislative Assembly
1		Kalyan Singh (Born 5 Jan 1932 – Died 21 Aug 2021)	Atrauli	4 July 1993	12 June 1995	1 year, 343 days	12th	Mulayam Singh Yadav
2		Lalji TandonKalyan Singh (Born 12 Apr 1935 – Died 21 Jul 2020)	Lucknow West	7 September 2003	13 May 2007	3 years, 248 days	14th	Mulayam Singh Yadav

=== List of State President of Bharatiya Janata Party – Uttar Pradesh ===
S.No.	Portrait	Name (born /death)	Term in office		
S.No.	Portrait	Name (born /death)	Assumed office	Left office	Time in office
President Bharatiya Janata Party – Uttar Pradesh
1		Madhav Prasad Tripathi (Born 12 Sep 1917 – Died 1985)	1980	1984	4 years
2		Kalyan Singh (Born 5 Jan 1932 – Died 21 Aug 2021)	1984	1990	6 years
3		Rajendra Kumar Gupta (Born 7 Jul 1936 – Died 7 Jan 2003)	1990	1991	1 year
4		Kalraj Mishra (Born 1 July 1941)	1991	1997	6 years
4		Kalraj Mishra (Born 1 July 1941)	17 August 2000	24 June 2002	1 year, 311 days
5		Rajnath Singh (Born 10 July 1951)	25 March 1997	3 January 2000	2 years, 284 days
6		Om Prakash Singh (Born 6 February 1946)	3 January 2000	17 August 2000	227 days
7		Vinay Katiyar (Born 11 November 1954)	24 June 2002	18 July 2004	2 years, 24 days
8		Keshari Nath Tripathi (Born 10 Nov 1934 - Died 8 Jan 2023)	18 July 2004	3 September 2007	3 years, 47 days
9		Ramapati Ram Tripathi (Born 14 November 1950)	3 September 2007	12 May 2010	2 years, 251 days
10		Surya Pratap Shahi (Born 23 December 1952)	12 May 2010	13 April 2012	1 year, 337 days
11		Laxmikant Bajpai (Born 20 July 1951)	13 April 2012	8 April 2016	3 years, 361 days
12		Keshav Prasad Maurya (Born 7 May 1969)	8 April 2016	31 August 2017	1 year, 145 days
13		Mahendra Nath Pandey (Born 15 October 1957)	31 August 2017	16 July 2019	1 year, 319 days
14		Swatantra Dev Singh (Born 13 February 1964)	16 July 2019	25 August 2022	3 years, 40 days
15	Bhupendra Singh	Bhupendra Chaudhary (Born 30 June 1968)	25 August 2022	14 December 2025	3 years, 111 days
16		Pankaj Chaudhary (Born 20 November 1964)	14 December 2025	incumbent	247 days

== See also ==
- Bharatiya Janata Party – Gujarat
- Bharatiya Janata Party – Assam
- Bharatiya Janata Party – Madhya Pradesh
- Organisation of the Bharatiya Janata Party
- Bharatiya Janata Party – Kerala
- Apna Dal (Sonelal)
- NISHAD Party
