= Bharatiya Janata Party – Delhi =

Delhi affiliate of the Bharatiya Janata Party

Bharatiya Janata Party – Delhi भारतीय जनता पार्टी – दिल्ली
- Abbreviation: BJP
- President: Harsh Malhotra
- Chairman: Rekha Gupta (Chief Minister)
- Founder: Atal Bihari Vajpayee; Lal Krishna Advani; Murli Manohar Joshi; Nanaji Deshmukh; K. R. Malkani; Sikandar Bakht; Vijay Kumar Malhotra; Vijaya Raje Scindia; Bhairon Singh Shekhawat; Shanta Kumar; Ram Jethmalani; Jagannathrao Joshi
- Founded: 6 April 1980 (46 years ago)
- Split from: Janata Party
- Preceded by: Bharatiya Jana Sangh (1951–1977); Janata Party (1977–1980)
- Headquarters: 14, Pandit Pant Marg New Delhi - 110001 Delhi
- Labour wing: Bharatiya Mazdoor Sangh
- Peasant's wing: Bharatiya Kisan Sangh
- Colours: Saffron
- Alliance: National Democratic Alliance
- Seats in Rajya Sabha: 1 / 3
- Seats in Lok Sabha: 7 / 7
- Seats in Delhi Legislative Assembly: 48 / 70
- Seats in Municipal Corporation of Delhi: 122 / 250

Election symbol
- Lotus

Party flag

Website
- www.bjp.org/delhi

The Bharatiya Janata Party – Delhi ( BJP - Delhi) is the state unit of the Bharatiya Janata Party in Delhi. Its head office is situated at 14, Pandit Pant Marg New Delhi - 110001 Delhi. The Current President of BJP Delhi is Harsh Malhotra.

== Electoral Performance ==
=== Lok Sabha Election ===
Year	Seats won	+/-	Outcome
Bharatiya Jana Sangh
1967	6 / 7	–	Opposition
Bharatiya Janata Party
1989	4 / 7	–	Government, later Opposition
1991	5 / 7	▲1	Opposition
1996	5 / 7	–	Government, later Opposition
1998	6 / 7	▲1	Government
1999	7 / 7	▲1	Government
2004	1 / 7	▼6	Opposition
2009	0 / 7	▼1	Opposition
2014	7 / 7	▲7	Government
2019	7 / 7	–	Government
2024	7 / 7	–	Government

=== Legislative Assembly Election ===
Year	Seats contested	Seats won	+/-	Votes	Voteshare (%)	+/- (%)	Outcome
Bharatiya Jana Sangh
1952	31	5 / 48	–	1,14,207	21.89%	New	Opposition
Bharatiya Janata Party
1993	70	49 / 70	–	15,20,675	47.82%	New	Government
1998	67	15 / 70	▼34	13,90,689	34.02%	▼13.8%	Opposition
2003	70	20 / 70	▲5	15,89,323	35.22%	▲1.2%	Opposition
2008	69	23 / 70	▲3	22,44,629	36.34%	▲1.12%	Opposition
2013	68	32 / 70	▲9	26,04,100	33.07%	▼3.27%	Opposition
2015	69	3 / 70	▼29	28,90,485	32.2%	▼0.87%	Opposition
2020	67	8 / 70	▲5	35,75,529	38.51%	▲6.31%	Opposition
2025	68	48 / 70	▲40	43,23,110	45.56%	▲7.05%	Government

== Leadership ==
=== Chief Minister ===
No	Portrait	Name	Constituency	Term of Office		Tenure	Assembly
1		Madan Lal Khurana	Moti Nagar	2 December 1993	26 February 1996	2 years, 86 days	1st
2		Sahib Singh Verma	Shalimar Bagh	26 February 1996	12 October 1998	2 years, 228 days	1st
3		Sushma Swaraj	Not Contested	12 October 1998	3 December 1998	52 days	1st
4		Rekha Gupta	Shalimar Bagh	20 February 2025	Incumbent	1 year, 232 days	8th

=== Leaders of the Opposition ===
No	Portrait	Name	Constituency	Term			Assembly	Chief Minister(s)
1		Madan Lal Khurana	Moti Nagar	1998	2003	5 years	2nd	Sheila Dikshit
2		Jagdish Mukhi	Janakpuri	2003	2008	5 years	3rd	Sheila Dikshit
3		Vijay Kumar Malhotra	Greater Kailash	2008	2013	5 years	4th	Sheila Dikshit
4		Harsh Vardhan	Krishna Nagar	2 December 2013	16 May 2014	165 days	5th	Arvind Kejriwal
5		Vijender Gupta	Rohini	16 April 2015	11 February 2020	4 years, 301 days	6th	Arvind Kejriwal
6		Ramvir Singh Bidhuri	Badarpur	24 February 2020	4 June 2024	4 years, 101 days	7th	Arvind Kejriwal; Atishi Marlena
(5)		Vijender Gupta	Rohini	4 August 2024	8 February 2025	188 days	7th	Arvind Kejriwal; Atishi Marlena

=== State President List ===
#	Portrait	Name	Tenure			Ref
1		Vijay Kumar Malhotra	1980	1984	4 years	
2		Kidar Nath Sahani	1984	1988	4 years	
3		Madan Lal Khurana	1988	1991	3 years	
4		Om Prakash Kohli	1991	1995	4 years	
(2)		Kidar Nath Sahani	30-Jun-1995	30-Jun-1998	3 years, 0 days	
5		Mange Ram Garg	30-Jun-1998	12-Jul-2002	4 years, 12 days	
(3)		Madan Lal Khurana	12-Jul-2002	19-Dec-2003	1 year, 160 days	
6		Harsh Vardhan	19-Dec-2003	7-Jan-2009	5 years, 19 days	
(4)		Om Prakash Kohli	7-Jan-2009	15-May-2010	1 year, 128 days	
7		Vijender Gupta	15-May-2010	15-Feb-2013	2 years, 276 days	
8		Vijay Goel	15-Feb-2013	19-Feb-2014	1 year, 4 days	
(6)		Harsh Vardhan	19-Feb-2014	8-Jul-2014	139 days	
9		Satish Upadhyay	8-Jul-2014	30-Nov-2016	2 years, 145 days	
10		Manoj Tiwari	30-Nov-2016	2-Jun-2020	3 years, 185 days	
11		Adesh Gupta	2-Jun-2020	23-Mar-2023	2 years, 294 days	
12		Virendra Sachdeva	23-Mar-2023	28-May-2026	3 years, 201 days	
13		Harsh Malhotra	28-May-2026	Incumbent	135 days	

== See also ==
- Bharatiya Janata Party
- National Democratic Alliance
- Delhi Legislative Assembly
- Municipal Corporation of Delhi
