= Integral humanism =

Integral Humanism may refer to:

- Integral humanism (Maritain), an aspect of Catholic social teaching originally advocated in 1936 by French philosopher Jacques Maritain as "Integral Christian Humanism", a forerunner of Christian democracy
- Integral humanism (Hindu nationalism), the political philosophy practised by the Bharatiya Janata Party and the former Bharatiya Jana Sangh of India, originally drafted by Deendayal Upadhyaya in 1965
