= Central Election Committee =

Central Election Committee may refer to:

- Central Election Committee of the Bharatiya Janata Party
- Central Election Committee of the Indian National Congress
- Central Elections Committee, a government agency in Israel
