= BJPS =

BJPS may refer to:

- Brebeuf Jesuit Preparatory School
- British Journal for the Philosophy of Science
- British Journal of Political Science
- Brazilian Journal of Probability and Statistics
- Bharatiya Janata Party – Sikkim, state unit of the Bharatiya Janata Party (Indian People's Party) in Sikkim

== See also ==
- BJP (disambiguation)
