= Mica Mazdoor Sangh =

Trade union in India

Mica Mazdoor Sangh, a trade union of mica mine labourers in the Gudur minesfields in Andhra Pradesh, India. MMS is affiliated to Bharatiya Mazdoor Sangh. MMS claims a membership of 1500 out of a total of 7000 workers.

Source: PUCL
