= Bharatiya Janata Party – Gujarat =

Gujarat affiliate of the Bharatiya Janata Party

- Abbreviation: BJP
- Leader: Bhupendrabhai Patel (Chief Minister)
- President: Jagdish Vishwakarma
- General Secretary: Ratnakarji (Organisation)
- Founder: Atal Bihari Vajpayee; Lal Krishna Advani; Murli Manohar Joshi; Nanaji Deshmukh; K. R. Malkani; Sikandar Bakht; Vijay Kumar Malhotra; Vijaya Raje Scindia; Bhairon Singh Shekhawat; Shanta Kumar; Ram Jethmalani; Jagannathrao Joshi
- Founded: 6 April 1980 (46 years ago)
- Headquarters: Opp. Preksha Vishwa Bharti, Koba Circle-Gandhinagar Road Koba, Gandhinagar, Gujarat 382007
- Colours: Saffron
- Seats in Rajya Sabha: 11 / 11
- Seats in Lok Sabha: 25 / 26
- Seats in Gujarat Legislative Assembly: 162 / 182

Election symbol
- Lotus

Party flag

Website
- bjpgujarat.org

Bharatiya Janata Party – Gujarat (BJP Gujarat) is the state unit of the Bharatiya Janata Party that operates in Gujarat. Jagdish Vishwakarma currently serves as state president of the party. The leader of the party is Bhupendrabhai R Patel, the incumbent chief minister of Gujarat. The head office of the party is located in Gandhinagar, Gujarat.

== Electoral history ==
=== Lok Sabha election ===
Year	Seats won	+/-	Outcome
Bharatiya Jana Sangh
1962	0 / 22	Steady	Opposition
1967	0 / 24	Steady	Opposition
1971	0 / 24	Steady	Opposition
Bharatiya Janata Party
1980	0 / 26	Steady	Opposition
1984	1 / 26	▲1	Opposition
1989	12 / 26	▲11	Outside support to JD
1991	20 / 26	▲8	Opposition
1996	16 / 26	▼4	Government, later Opposition
1998	19 / 26	▲3	Government
1999	20 / 26	▲1	Government
2004	14 / 26	▼6	Opposition
2009	15 / 26	▲1	Opposition
2014	26 / 26	▲11	Government
2019	26 / 26	Steady	Government
2024	25 / 26	▼1	Government

=== Vidhan Sabha election ===
Year	Seats won	+/-	Voteshare (%)	+/- (%)	Outcome
Bharatiya Jana Sangh
1962	0 / 154	Steady	1.34%	▲1.34%	Opposition
1967	1 / 168	▲1	1.88%	▲0.54%	Opposition
1972	3 / 168	▲2	9.29%	▲7.41%	Opposition
1975	18 / 182	▲15	8.82%	▼0.47%	Government
Bharatiya Janata Party
1980	9 / 182	▲5	14.02%	▲14.02%	Opposition
1985	11 / 182	▲2	14.96%	▲0.94%	Opposition
1990	67 / 182	▲56	26.69%	▲11.73%	Government, later Opposition
1995	121 / 182	▲54	42.51%	▲15.82	Government
1998	117 / 182	▼4	44.81%	▲2.3%	Government
2002	127 / 182	▲10	49.85%	▲5.04%	Government
2007	117 / 182	▼10	49.12%	▼0.73%	Government
2012	115 / 182	▼2	47.85%	▼1.27%	Government
2017	99 / 182	▼16	49.05%	▲1.2%	Government
2022	156 / 182	▲57	52.50%	▲3.45%	Government

== Leadership ==
=== Chief Ministers ===
Following is the list of the chief ministers of Gujarat from Bhartiya Janta Party

#	Portrait	Name	Constituency	Term of Office			Assembly
1		Keshubhai Patel	Visavadar	14 March 1995	21 October 1995	4 years, 73 days	9th
1		Keshubhai Patel	Visavadar	4 March 1998	7 October 2001	4 years, 73 days	10th
2		Suresh Mehta	Mandvi	21 October 1995	19 September 1996	334 days	9th
3		Narendra Modi	Rajkot West	7 October 2001	22 December 2002	12 years, 227 days	10th
3		Narendra Modi	Maninagar	22 December 2002	23 December 2007	12 years, 227 days	11th
3		Narendra Modi	Maninagar	23 December 2007	20 December 2012	12 years, 227 days	12th
3		Narendra Modi	Maninagar	20 December 2012	22 May 2014	12 years, 227 days	13th
4		Anandiben Patel	Ghatlodia	22 May 2014	7 August 2016	2 years, 77 days	13th
5		Vijay Rupani	Rajkot West	7 August 2016	26 December 2017	5 years, 37 days	13th
5		Vijay Rupani	Rajkot West	26 December 2017	13 September 2021	5 years, 37 days	14th
6		Bhupendrabhai Patel	Ghatlodia	13 September 2021	12 December 2022	4 years, 268 days	14th
6		Bhupendrabhai Patel	Ghatlodia	12 December 2022	Incumbent	4 years, 268 days	15th

=== Deputy Chief Ministers ===
Following is the list of the deputy chief ministers of Gujarat from Bhartiya Janta Party

#	Portrait	Name	Constituency	Term of Office			Assembly	Chief Minister
1		Keshubhai Patel	Visavadar	4 March 1990	25 October 1990	235 days	8th	Chimanbhai Patel
2		Nitinbhai Patel	Mahesana	7 August 2016	26 December 2017	5 years, 37 days	13th	Vijay Rupani
2		Nitinbhai Patel	Mahesana	26 December 2017	13 September 2021	5 years, 37 days	14th	Vijay Rupani
3		Harsh Sanghavi	Majura	17 October 2025	incumbent	234 days	15th	Bhupendrabhai Patel

== President ==
Following is the list of the presidents of Gujarat from Bhartiya Janta Party

#	Portrait	Name	Term of Office		
1					
2		A. K. Patel	1982	1985	3 years
3		Kashiram Rana	1985	1987	2 years
(3)		Kashiram Rana	1993	1996	3 years
		Vajubhai Vala	1996	1998	2 years
		Rajendrasinh Rana	1998	2005	7 years
		Vajubhai Vala	29 May 2005	26 October 2006	1 year, 150 days
		Parshottam Rupala	26 October 2006	1 February 2010	3 years, 98 days
		R. C. Faldu	1 February 2010	19 February 2016	6 years, 18 days
		Vijay Rupani	19 February 2016	10 August 2016	173 days
		Jitu Vaghani	10 August 2016	20 July 2020	3 years, 345 days
		C. R. Patil	20 July 2020	4 October 2025	5 years, 76 days
		Jagdish Vishwakarma	4 October 2025	present	247 days

== See also ==
- Bharatiya Janata Party
- Bharatiya Janata Party – Kerala
- National Democratic Alliance
- Bharatiya Jana Sangh
