= Adhikarimayum Sharda Devi =

Indian politician and teacher

Member of Parliament, Rajya Sabha
- Incumbent
- Assumed office 22 June 2026
- Preceded by: Leishemba Sanajaoba
- Constituency: Manipur

President of the Bharatiya Janata Party, Manipur
- Incumbent
- Assumed office 26 June 2021
- National President: JP Nadda; Nitin Nabin

Personal details
- Party: Bharatiya Janata Party
- Occupation: Teacher

Adhikarimayum Sharda Devi is an Indian politician and teacher from Manipur who served as National Vice President of Bharatiya Janata Party from 2014 to 2016 and currently serving as the State President of Bharatiya Janta Party of Manipur. She is the first woman President of Bharatiya Janata Party Manipur.

Adhikarimayum Sharda Devi won the Rajya Sabha seat from the Manipur unopposed and took oath on 29 June 2026.
