= Dattopant Thengadi =

Indian Social Activist

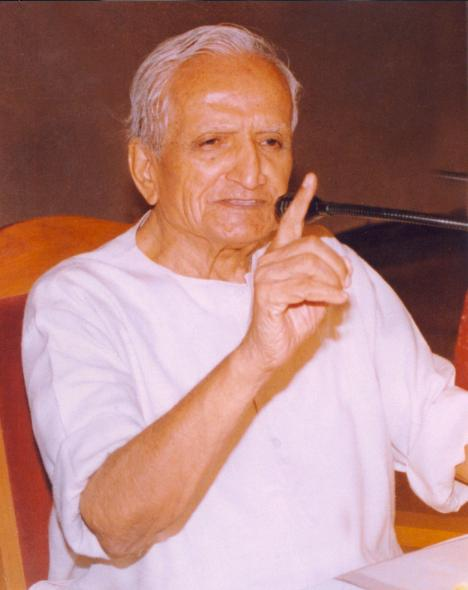
- Born: Dattatrye Bapurao Thengadi; 10 November 1920; Arvi town, Wardha District, Maharashtra, British India
- Died: 14 October 2004 (aged 83); Pune, Maharashtra, Republic of India
- Education: Morris College
- Organization(s): Rashtriya Swayamsevak Sangh; All India Congress Committee; Communist Party of India
- Known for: Bharatiya Mazdoor Sangh; Akhil Bharatiya Adhivakta Parishad; Bharatiya Kisan Sangh
- Parent(s): Bapurao Dajeebaa Thengadi (father); Shrimati Janaki Devi (mother)
- Awards: Awarded the Padma Bhushan, but he declined to accept it.
- Website: https://dbthengadi.in/

Dattopant Bapurao Thengadi, (Marathi: दत्तोपंत ठेंगडी, 10 November 1920 – 14 October 2004) was an Indian Hindu nationalist, trade union leader associated with Bharatiya Mazdoor Sangh, Akhil Bharatiya Adhivakta Parishad and the Bharatiya Kisan Sangh. He was born in Arvi, Wardha, Maharashtra.

Thengadi was a full-time Rashtriya Swayamsevak Sangh pracharak until his death on 14 October 2004. He was awarded the Padma Bhushan, but refused to accept it.

== Early history ==
Dattatreya Bapurao Thengadi was born in Arvi, Wardha, Maharashtra on 10 November 1920. He studied law at Law College in Nagpur. He finished his post-graduation from Morris College and LLB from Law College in Nagpur. He was a lawyer as well as a philosopher, and displayed an early talent for administration. At the age of 15, he served as president of the "Vanar Sena" as well as the Municipal High School student union at Arvi. He became a full-time pracharak in 1942.

He worked as organizing secretary of the Indian National Trade Union Congress (INTUC) from 1950–51, and was associated with the Postal & Railway Workers Union. He was organising secretary of the Bharatiya Jana Sangh for Madhya Pradesh (1952–53) and South India (1956–57).

He was influenced by Madhavrao Sadashivrao Golwalkar. Some of his other influences are Babasaheb Ambedkar and Deendayal Upadhyaya.

== Organisations ==
Thengadi founded Bharatiya Mazdoor Sangh (1955), Bharatiya Kisan Sangh (1979), Samajik Samarasata Manch, Swadeshi Jagaran Manch, Sarva Panth Samadar Manch, and Paryavaran Manch. He was also a co-founder of Akhil Bharatiya Vidyarthi Parishad, Akhil Bharatiya Adhivakta Parishad (1992), Akhil Bharatiya Grahak Panchayat and Bharatiya Vichara Kendra.

== Parliament ==
Thengadi was a member of the Rajya Sabha from Bharatiya Jana Sangh for two terms during 1964–76, also serving as its vice-chairman in 1968–70. He organized protests during the anti-Emergency movement in 1975.

== Works ==
The following is a list of the book authored by him :

- The Third Way
- Modernization without Westernization
- What Sustains Sangh?
- Our National Renaissance
- The Perspective
- Global Economic System- A Hindu view
- Marx and Deen Dayal- Two Approaches

== Death ==
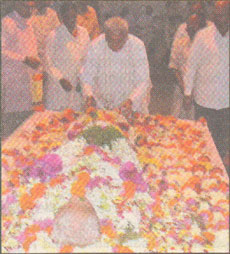
Ashok Singhal giving tribute to Dattopant Thengadi.

Thengadi died on 14 October 2004 due to brain hemorrhage.
