= BJP (disambiguation) =

The BJP is the Bharatiya Janata Party, India's ruling political party.

BJP may also refer to:

- Bangladesh Jatiya Party, a Bangladeshi political party
- Bence Jones protein, a biomolecule
- British Journal of Photography, a photography magazine
- Tangga language (ISO 639 code: bjp), spoken in Papua New Guinea
- BJP!, a slogan of MMA fighter Jiří Procházka
- Pradhan Mantri Bharatiya Janaushadhi Pariyojana, (PM BJP), a public welfare scheme in India
- Vijayapura railway station, station code BJP

== See also ==
- BJPS (disambiguation)
