= Mahatma Gandhi Chitrakoot Gramodaya Vishwavidyalaya =

University at Madhya Pradesh, India

- महात्मा गांधी चित्रकूट ग्रामोदय विश्वविद्यालय
- Other names: MGCGV, Chitrakoot Gramodaya University
- Former name: Chitrakoot Gramodaya Vishwavidyalaya
- Type: Public
- Established: 1991; 35 years ago
- Founder: Nanaji Deshmukh
- Accreditation: NAAC (Grade 'A++')
- Academic affiliations: UGC, ICAR
- Chancellor: Governor of Madhya Pradesh
- Vice-Chancellor: Prof. Alok Chaube
- Location: Chitrakoot, Madhya Pradesh, India; 25.148°N 80.855°E
- Campus: 231 Acre; Rural
- Website: gramodayachitrakoot.ac.in

Mahatma Gandhi Chitrakoot Gramodaya Vishwavidyalaya (MGCGV), formerly Chitrakoot Gramodaya Vishwavidhayalay and Mahatma Gandhi Gramodaya Vishwavidyalaya, is a first rural state university located at Chitrakoot, Madhya Pradesh, India. It was established in 1991.

== History ==
The university was established in 1991 by Nanaji Deshmukh as Chitrakoot Gramodaya Vishwavidhayalay under The Chitrakoot Gramodaya Vishwavidhayalay Adhiniyam, 1991. The name was changed to Mahatma Gandhi Gramodaya Vishwavidyalaya in 1995 through The Chitrakoot Gramodaya Vishwavidyalaya (Sanshodhan) Adhiniyam, 1995, naming the university after Mahatma Gandhi. Finally, it received its current name in 1997 under The Mahatma Gandhi Gramodaya Vishwavidyalaya (Sanshodhan) Adhiniyam, 1997 which restored the name Chitrakoot to the title of the university.

== Faculties and departments ==
The university is divided into five faculties and 16 departments:

- Faculty of Agriculture
  - Department of Crop Sciences
  - Department of Natural Resource Management
  - Department of Technology Transfer
- Faculty of Arts
  - Department of People's Education and Mass Communication
  - Department of Fine Arts
  - Department of Humanities Social Sciences
  - Department of Hindi
  - Department of Sanskrit
- Faculty of Rural Development and Business Management
  - Department of Rural Development
  - Department of Business Management
- Faculty of Science and Environment
  - Department of Physical Science
  - Department of Biological Science
  - Department of Energy and Environment
- Faculty of Engineering and Technology
  - Department of Electronics and Communication Engineering
  - Department of Food and Agriculture Engineering
  - Department of Rural Engineering
