= Indramoni Bora =

Indian politician (1938–2019)

Indramoni Bora (19 February 1937 – 28 December 2019) was a veteran Indian politician, Member of Parliament and President of Bharatiya Janata Party in Assam.

He was born to Senior Advocate and freedom fighter K.R. Bora and Mrs. Nalini Bora, the 7th out of their 8 children. His eldest sister Amaya was the wife of former Assam Chief Minister Bimala Prasad Chaliha.

An alumnus of the Cotton University, he was both an orator and a footballer throughout his academic life. He was considered to be a selfless, principled man.

He followed his father's footsteps into public service, became the flag bearer of Bhartiya Janata Party in Assam and worked in close association with former Prime Minister Atal Bihari Vajpayee and veteran politicians Lal Krishna Advani, Murli Manohar Joshi, Rajmata Shrimati Vijaya Raje Scindia all of whom frequently visited his ancestral home in Guwahati, Assam. He was the BJP President of Assam for several years and Member of Parliament from 2001 to 2007, after which he retired from active politics.

He is survived by his wife Aditi Bora, two daughters, two sons-in-law, his only son, daughter-in-law and grandchildren.

His demise was deeply mourned by the people of Assam. Several veteran politicians from across the country paid their last respects at his funeral. He was cremated with full State Honours at Navagraha Crematorium in Guwahati, Assam.
