= Dilip Saikia =

Indian politician (born 1973)

Member of Parliament, Lok Sabha
- Incumbent
- Assumed office 23 May 2019
- Preceded by: Ramen Deka
- Constituency: Darrang-Udalguri, Assam

President of Bharatiya Janata Party, Assam
- Incumbent
- Assumed office 17 January 2025
- President: J. P. Nadda; Nitin Nabin
- Preceded by: Bhabesh Kalita

National General Secretary of the Bharatiya Janata Party
- In office September 2020 – 2023

Personal details
- Born: 1 September 1973 (age 53) Purna Kamdev, Assam, India
- Party: Bharatiya Janata Party (since 2002)
- Spouse: Niju Barman Saikia (m. 2007)
- Children: 2
- Parent: Prabin Saikia (father)
- Education: Gauhati Commerce College (Gauhati University)
- Occupation: Politician

Dilip Saikia (born 1 September 1973) is an Indian politician serving as a Member of Lok Sabha from Darrang–Udalguri. He is also the Member of Panel of Chairpersons of the 18th Lok Sabha since 2024. He has served as the president of BJP Assam since 2025.

== Biography ==
Dilip Saika has been President of the Bharatiya Janata Party (BJP), Assam state unit since 2025. He was elected to the Lok Sabha, the lower house of the Parliament of India, from Mangaldoi in Assam in the 2019 Indian general election as a member of the BJP. He was the national general secretary of BJP. He is a former state Secretary and state organising secretary of Akhil Bharatiya Vidyarthi Parishad ABVP Assam Pradesh.
