= BJP Mahila Morcha =

Affiliate organization of the Bharatiya Janata Party (BJP)

- President: Rupkumari Choudhary
- Headquarters: New Delhi
- Newspaper: Kamal Sandesh
- Ideology: Integral humanism; Conservatism; Hindu Nationalism

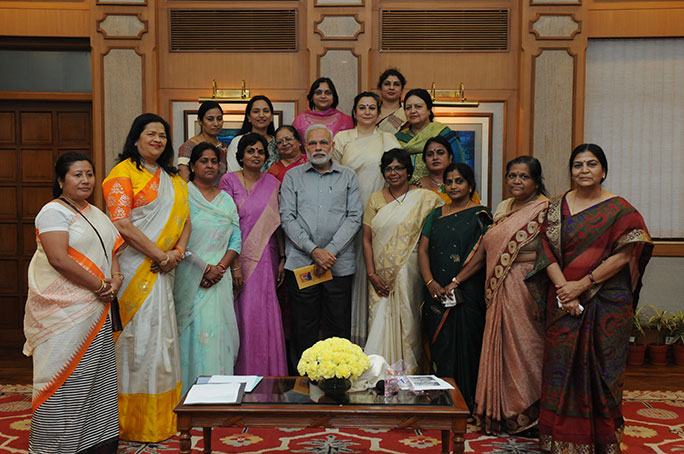
Mahila Morcha office bearers meet of Prime Minister Narendra Modi in 2015

Mahila Morcha (IPA: Mahilā Mōrcā, transl. Women's Front), is the women's wing of the Bharatiya Janata Party (BJP). Rupkumari Choudhary, MP from Mahasamund Lok Sabha constituency is the current president of Mahila Morcha.

== List of presidents ==
The list of Mahila Morcha presidents from 1980 to present is given here:

- Raja Mataji (1980—1985)
- Mridula Sinha (1985—1991)
- Jayawanti Ben Mehta (1991—1995)
- Mridula Sinha (1995 —1998)
- Maya Singh (1998—2000)
- Surama Padhy (2000—2002)
- Kanta Tai Nalawade (2002—2004)
- Karuna Shukla (2004—2007)
- Kiran Maheshwari (2007—2010)
- Smriti Irani (24 June 2010—24 April 2013)
- Saroj Pandey (24 April 2013—21 August 2014)
- Vijaya Rahatkar (21 August 2014—28 October 2020)
- Vanathi Srinivasan (28 October 2020—16 August 2026)
- Rupkumari Choudhary (17 August 2026—present)

== Campaigns ==
In September 2019, the Mahila Morcha used the Durga Puja festival in a campaign to spread the BJP party's message to women particularly on Article 370 and the National Register of Citizens (NRC).

== See also ==
- Rupkumari Choudhary, President of Mahila Morcha
- Bharatiya Janata Party, The parent political party
- Bharatiya Janata Yuva Morcha, the youth wing of BJP
- All India Mahila Congress, comparable women's wing of opposition party
