= Integral humanism (Hindu nationalism) =

Political program adopted in 1965 as the official doctrine of the Jan Sangh

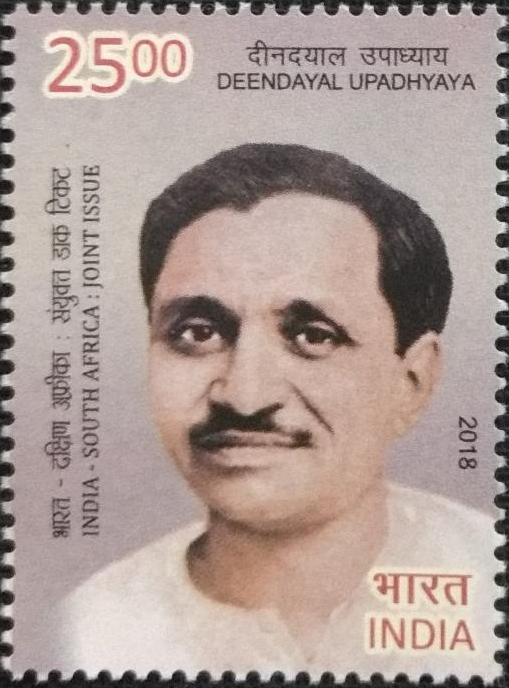
Deendayal Upadhyay portrayed in a postage stamp in 2018.

Integral humanism was a set of concepts drafted by Deendayal Upadhyaya as a political program and adopted in 1965 as the official doctrine of the Jan Sangh and later the Bharatiya Janata Party (BJP). The doctrine is also interpreted as a "universal brotherhood", an earlier Freemasonic and in turn Theosophical concept. Upadhyaya borrowed the Gandhian principles such as sarvodaya (progress of all), swadeshi (domestic), and Gram Swaraj (village self rule) and these principles were appropriated selectively to give more importance to cultural-national values. These values were based on an individual's undisputed subservience to nation as a corporate entity.

The creation and adoption of these concepts helped to suit the major discourses in the Indian political arena of 1960s and 1970s. This highlighted efforts to portray the Jan Sangh and Hindu nationalist movement as a high profile right fringe of the Indian political mainstream. A major change here in compared to Golwalkar's works was the use of the word "Bhartiya" which Richard Fox had translated as "Hindian", combination of Hindu Indian. Due to the official secularism in politics, it had become impossible to invoke explicit reference to "Hindu" and the usage of the word Bhartiya allowed to circumvent this political reality.

Upadhyaya considered that it was of utmost importance for India to develop an indigenous economic model with the human being at center stage. Integral Humanism was adopted as Jan Sangh's political doctrine and its new openness to other opposition forces made it possible for the Hindu nationalist movement to have an alliance in the early 1970s with the prominent Gandhian Sarvodaya movement going on under the leadership of J. P. Narayan. This was considered as the first major public breakthrough for the Hindu nationalist movement.

== Philosophy ==
According to Deendayal Upadhyaya, the primary concern in India should be to develop an indigenous development model that has human beings as its core focus.

It is opposed to both western capitalist individualism and Marxist socialism, though welcoming to western science. It seeks a middle ground between capitalism and socialism, evaluating both systems on their respective merits, while being critical of their excesses and alienness.

=== Four objectives of humankind ===
Humankind, according to Upadhyaya, had four hierarchically organised attributes of body, mind, intellect and soul which corresponded to the four universal objectives of dharma (moral duties), artha (wealth), kama (desire or satisfaction), and moksha (total liberation or 'salvation'). While none could be ignored, dharma is the 'basic', and moksha the 'ultimate' objective of humankind and society. He claimed that the problem with both capitalist and socialist ideologies is that they only consider the needs of body and mind, and were hence based on the materialist objectives of desire and wealth.

=== Rejection of individualism ===
Upadhyaya rejected social systems in which individualism 'reigned supreme'. He also rejected communism in which individualism was 'crushed' as part of a 'large heartless machine'. Society, according to Upadhyaya, rather than arising from a social contract between individuals, was fully born at its inception itself as a natural living organism with a definitive 'national soul' or 'ethos' and its needs of the social organism paralleled those of the individual.

== Origins ==
=== Advaita Vedanta ===
Upadhyaya was of the opinion that Integral Humanism followed the tradition of Advaita developed by Adi Shankara. Nondualism represented the unifying principle of every object in the universe, and of which humankind was a part. This, claimed Upadhyaya, was the essence and contribution of Indian culture.

=== Mahatma Gandhi ===
Integral humanism is almost an exact paraphrase of Mahatma Gandhi's vision of a future India. Both seek a distinctive path for India, both reject the materialism of socialism and capitalism alike, both reject the individualism of modern society in favour of a holistic, varna-dharma based community, both insist upon an infusion of religious and moral values in politics, and both seek a culturally authentic mode of modernisation that preserves Hindu values.

Integral humanism contains visions organised around two themes: morality in politics and swadeshi, and small-scale industrialisation in economies, all Gandhian in their general thematic but distinctly Hindu nationalist. These notions revolve around the basic themes of harmony, primacy of cultural-national values, and discipline.

== Contrast with Nehruvian economic policies ==
Upadhyaya rejects Nehruvian economic policies and industrialisation on the grounds that they were borrowed uncritically from the West, in disregard of the cultural and spiritual heritage of the country. There is a need, according to Upadhyaya, to strike a balance between Indian and Western thinking in light of the dynamic nature of Indian society and the cultural heritage of the country. The Nehruvian model of economic development, emphasising the increase of material wealth through rapid industrialisation, promoted consumerism in Indian society. Not only has this ideology of development created social disparities and regional imbalances in economic growth, but it has failed to alleviate poverty in the country. The philosophy of integral humanism, like Gandhism, opposes unbridled consumerism, since such an ideology is alien to Indian culture. This traditional culture stresses putting guardrails on one's desires and advocates spiritual contentment rather than ruthless pursuit of material wealth.

== See also ==
- Integral humanism (Maritain)
- Integralism
- Traditionalist conservatism
- Hindu nationalism
- Hindutva

== Sources ==
- Gosling, David (2001). Religion and ecology in India and southeast Asia. London New York: Routledge. ISBN 0-415-24030-1.
- Hansen, Thomas (1999). The Saffron Wave: Democracy and Hindu nationalism in modern India. NJ: Princeton University Press. ISBN 9780691006710. Archived from the original on 4 September 2009. Alt URL
- Bhatt, Chetan (2001). Hindu nationalism origins, ideologies, and modern myths. Oxford New York: Berg. ISBN 1-85973-343-3.
- Nanda, Meera (2003). Prophets facing backward: postmodern critiques of science and Hindu nationalism in India. New Brunswick, N.J: Rutgers University Press. ISBN 0-8135-3357-0.
- Malik, Yogendra (1994). Hindu nationalists in India : the rise of the Bharatiya Janata Party. Boulder: Westview Press. ISBN 0-8133-8810-4.
- Téatreault, Mary; Denemark, Robert A. (2004). Gods, guns, and globalization : religious radicalism and international political economy. Boulder, Colo: Lynne Rienner Publishers. ISBN 1-58826-253-7.
- Marty, Martin (1993). Fundamentalisms and the state : remaking polities, economies, and militance. Chicago: University of Chicago Press. ISBN 978-0-226-50884-9.
- Koertge, Noretta (2005). Scientific values and civic virtues. Oxford New York: Oxford University Press. ISBN 978-0-19-517224-9.
