= Bharatiya Kisan Sangh =

Indian farmers' organization

- Abbreviation: BKS
- Formation: 4 March 1979 (47 years ago)
- Legal status: Active
- Headquarters: New Delhi, India
- Region served: India
- Parent organization: Rashtriya Swayamsevak Sangh
- Website: bharatiyakisansangh.org

The Bharatiya Kisan Sangh (BKS) (English: Indian Farmers' Union) is an organisation that is a subsidiary of the Rashtriya Swayamsevak Sangh (RSS), a Hindutva organisation, and a member of the Sangh Parivar. The BKS was founded by Dattopant Thengadi in 1978. As of 2000, RSS claimed that the BKS had a quarter of a million members, organised in 11,000 villages and 301 districts across the country. The organisation is dominated by members of the landed gentry.

== History ==
=== Beginnings ===
The first chapter of the BKS to be formed was its Rajasthan branch, founded on 13 March 1978. The all India organisation of the BKS was announced by Dattopant Thengadi on 4 March 1979 at the first All India Conference of BKS in Kota. The 650 delegates at the 1979 conference had been handpicked by Thengadi, who travelled across the country to meet with farmers' representatives. The launch of the BKS was preceded by earlier efforts of RSS to organise the peasantry. In the 1960s, RSS had organised farmers in the Vidarbha region, and again in 1972 in Uttar Pradesh. The RSS effort to build an agrarian front, parallel to Bharatiya Mazdoor Sangh trade union movement, had however failed to attract major mass support.

=== 1980s ===
On 26 February 1981 the BKS held a mass rally at the Andhra Pradesh Legislative Assembly in Hyderabad, the first major farmers' mobilisation after the Green Revolution. The organising of peasants in areas of Andhra Pradesh such as Karimnagar district, Nizamabad district and Warangal district led to tensions with the dominant Naxal movement in the area, and in February 1984 BKS Karimnagar District Secretary Gopal Reddy and Ramchander Rao (a RSS Tehsil-level organiser) were killed in Jagityal. In July 1985 BKS organised a mass rally at the Rajasthan Legislative Assembly, a protest movement that forced the state government to lower electricity prices.

In 1986–1987 BKS led a mass movement in Gujarat, culminating in a violent gherao of the Gujarat Legislative Assembly in March 1987. The campaign began in October 1986, following two years of drought in the state. On 1 January 1987 a mass rally of 400,000 people was held in Vijaypur. The movement culminated in the gherao of the Legislative Assembly, at which police fire killed four demonstrators at the 19 March 1987 gherao, and one police officer was killed by the demonstrators. The BKS leadership was arrested and the organisation declared an indefinite state-wide bandh following the clashes. The 1986–1987 Gujarat movement was marked by a competition between BKS (based mainly in northern Gujarat, with some influence in central Gujarat) and the Khedut Samaj and Kisan Sanghatana (based in south Gujarat). Whilst the movement had a larger charter of demands, its key demand was the lowering of electricity prices for farmers. BJP supported the BKS agitation, as means of countering the influence of Sharad Joshi in the state.

=== Later history ===
With its base among wealthier farmers, BKS supported the privatisation of inputs and increased mechanisation of agriculture in the 1990s. In Gujarat BKS became primarily dominated by cotton farmers, an export-oriented cash crop.

BKS held its sixth national conference in Hastinapur in 1999, addressed by RSS sarsanghchalak Rajendra Singh. At the time, Kunvarji Bhai Jadhav, was the BKS president. Anand Prakash Singhal, elder brother of VHP head Ashok Singhal and a US-educated agriculturist, played a significant role in the BKS. He was instrumental in India obtaining the patent for cow urine.

== Political line ==
BKS describes itself as an apolitical organisation, and its by-laws indicate that the BKS banner is ochre colour (rather than the nearly identical saffron colour of the RSS banner). The organisation describes itself as an organisation 'by farmers, for farmers', promoting agricultural self-reliance. Organisers of BKS are generally RSS members or sympathisers, its leader is largely pro-Bharatiya Janata Party. The motto of the organisation, in Sanskrit, is 'Krishi Mit Krishaswa' ('Do farming yourself'), taken from the Rigveda. The organisation opposes Genetic engineering crops in oilseed production.

Whilst politically close to BJP, its relations with the party hasn't always been uncomplicated. When Narendra Modi, as Chief Minister of Gujarat, increased electricity prices in 2003 the BKS launched a protest movement against the BJP government, with a 50,000 strong protest in Gandhinagar. The BJP responded by evicting the BKS from its state headquarters at the Members of Legislative Assembly quarters. The RSS intervened, trying to reconcile BKS and BJP in the state. But in Gujarat BKS refused to support BJP in the 2004 Indian general election. In 2007, the BKS showed resentment with the ruling Bharatiya Janata Party (BJP) government in Gujarat. Dissatisfied with the prevailing cotton prices, it led to farmers' agitation in Saurashtra.

In September 2020, the BKS also protested against the agriculture bills passed by the Parliament and asked for modifications to the bill.
