= Kamal Sandesh =

Indian political magazine

- Kamal Sandesh English Cover, 16–31 March 2020
- Editor: Shiv Shakti Bakshi
- Frequency: Monthly
- Publisher: Mookerjee Smruti Nyas
- Founded: 1998
- Country: India
- Based in: Delhi
- Language: Hindi; English
- Website: www.kamalsandesh.org

Kamal Sandesh is an Indian magazine which was launched in 1998. It is the national mouthpiece of the Bharatiya Janata Party. Shiv Shakti Bakshi is the editor of Kamal Sandesh.

== See also ==
- Saamana, a Marathi-language newspaper published in Maharashtra
