= Bharatiya Mazdoor Sangh =

Trade union in India

- Bharatiya Mazdoor Sangh flag
- Abbreviation: BMS
- Founded: 23 July 1955 (71 years ago)
- Founder: Dattopant Thengadi
- Type: Trade Union
- Legal status: Active
- Headquarters: Sir Sobha Singh Buildings, Garstin Bastion Road, New Delhi, India
- Members: 6,215,797 (2002)
- National President (Present): Hiranmany Pandya
- National General Secretary (Present): Ravindra Himte
- Key people: Saji Narayanan C K, Surendra Kumar Pandey, Virjesh Upadhyay, B Surendran, Durairaj, Hari Prasad G, Malla Jagadish Rao
- Parent organization: Rashtriya Swayamsevak Sangh (RSS)
- Website: www.bms.org.in

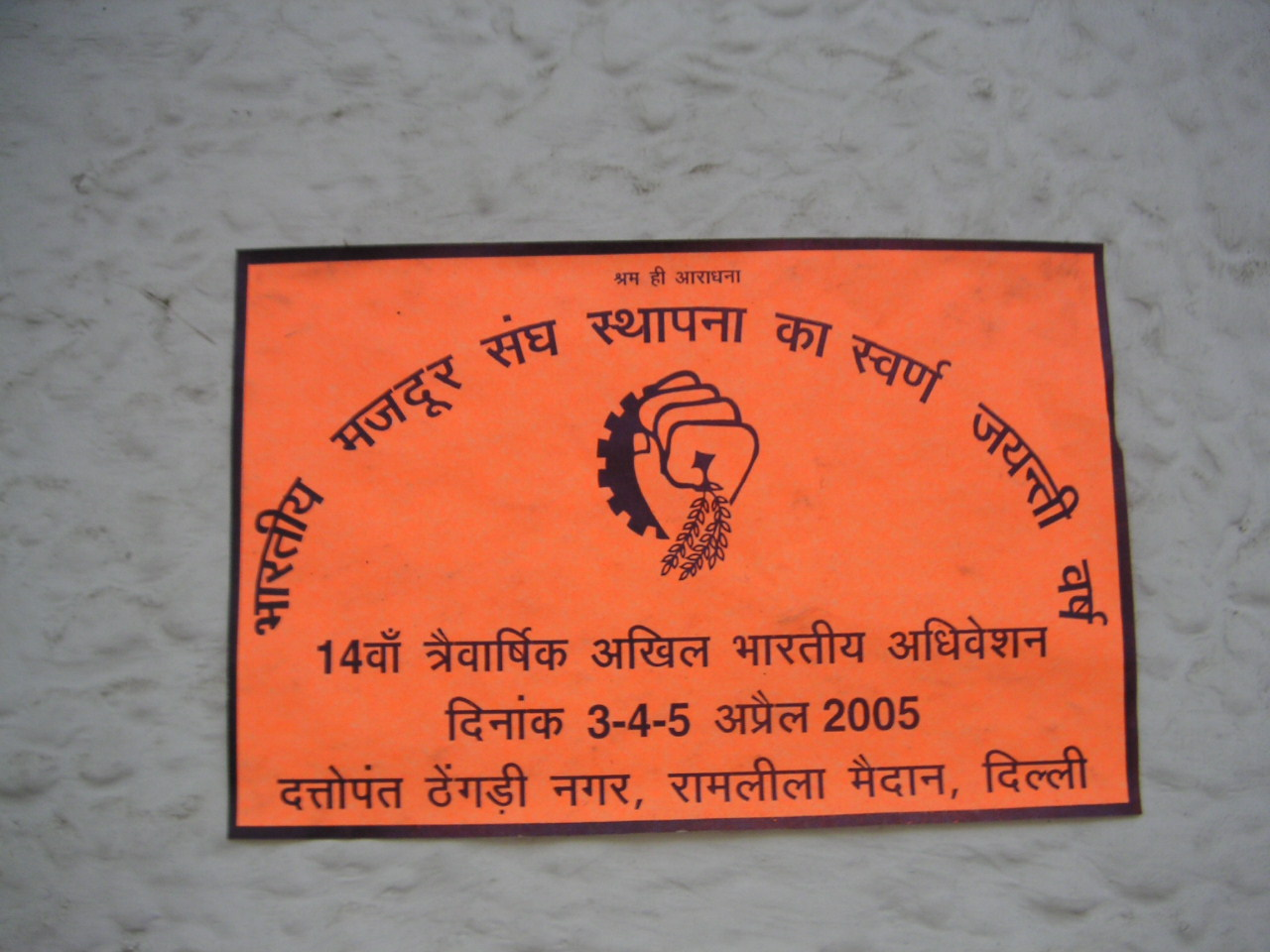
BMS sticker

The Bharatiya Mazdoor Sangh (BMS) (translation: Indian Workers' Union) is a trade union in India. It was founded by Dattopant Thengadi on 23 July 1955. It is the labour wing of the Rashtriya Swayamsevak Sangh, a right-wing Hindutva paramilitary organisation, and forms a part of the Sangh Parivar, a collective of Hindutva organisations. The BMS is not affiliated to any International Trade Union Confederation.

The BMS itself claims to have more than 10 million members. According to provisional statistics from the Ministry of Labour, the BMS had a membership of 6,215,797 in 2002. The BMS protested against the neoliberal policies of the Narasimha Rao Government, the Deve Gowda Government, and the Gujral Government. During the tenure of the NDA Government also which had “friends” of BMS in it, BMS had to oppose the anti-labour policies. During the second Modi Government, it called for a nationwide movement on 10 June 2020 to protest against the privatisation of public-sector undertakings (PSUs).

== History ==
The BMS has its origins in the Bharatiya Jan Sangh (BJS), which established its labour wing at its all-India session in Jodhpur in January 1955. In July 1955, its founding conference formally declared it to be the labour front of the Jan Sangh. Subsequently it credited its formation to RSS instead. It was considered to be a reaction to the organizations with leftist ideologies as well as with "imported ideologies such as communism and capitalism" that dominated post-independent India

For the first 12 years it functioned without a formal organizational structure. But it continued to establish state units and trained cadre of young workers. In 1967, a national executive was elected for the first time.

The Sino-Indian War of 1962 lent momentum to the anti-communist messaging and the 1965 Indo-Pakistan war further benefited their politics. This provided an indirect boost to both Jan Sangh and BMS.

In 1974, BMS joined the all-India general strike to support Jayaprakash Narayan's movement against the Indira Gandhi government. BMS General Secretary Dattopant Thengdi resigned the union post to serve as secretary of Narayan's Lok Sangharsh Samiti. Many BMS functionaries with RSS links were jailed, following a ban on RSS. Although it was a setback at that time, it generated a larger base for the organization in subsequent years.

== Ideology ==
BMS has three slogans, "Nationalise the labour, labourise the industry and industrialise the nation". It rejects the Marxist and socialist trade unionism, and the class-conflict framework of such organizations. It frames all citizens to be as an interconnected parts of a single national body whose interests cannot be mutually opposed. Its philosophy includes "Integral Humanism", given by Deendayal Upadhyaya, Samajik Samrasta and Dharma.

=== Swadeshi economics ===
BMS advocates for "Swadeshi economics" as an alternative to what it characteristically considers to be an externally imposed developmental model. The organization called "New Economic Policy" and "New Industrial Policy" as "second war of economic independence". It opposed the conditions laid by the International Monetary Fund and the World Bank arguing that it infringed national sovereignty.

BMS promotes use of "Swadeshi" products and pushes for the development of indigenous technologies. It states that it is not opposed to technological advancement in general, but argues it to prioritise technology suited to India's condition, beneficial to traditional artisans and crafters.
