= Jagannathrao Joshi =

Indian politician (1920–1991)

Jagannathrao Joshi (23 June 1920 – 15 July 1991) was an Indian politician and a senior leader of the Bharatiya Jana Sangh (BJS) and Bharatiya Janata Party (BJP).

He was born at Nargund, Karnataka on 23 June 1920. He completed his matriculation from Nutan Marathi Vidyalaya in Pune and graduation in English Hons from Sir Parshurambhau College. Inspired by the ideology of the Rashtriya Swayamsevak Sangh, he began his political career with the Jana Sangh in Pune.

Joshi was elected to the Lok Sabha twice from Madhya Pradesh as Jana Sangh member, in 1967 (from Bhopal) and 1971 (from Shajapur). He was stood in 1976 Lok Sabha Speaker election, but lost. Later, he served as a member of the Rajya Sabha from 1978 to 1984. He was BJP's candidate from Pune in 1984 Lok Sabha elections.

He actively participated in the Goa Liberation Movement. His contribution to building the BJS and BJP in Karnataka earned him the epithet "Karnataka Kesari" (Lion of Karnataka). He spoke and delivered political speeches in various languages, such as Hindi, English, Kannada and Marathi, all of which he was fluent in.

Joshi died on 15 July 1991 at the age of 71.

A Government Primary School at Sanquelim in Goa is named in his honour.
