= Nanaji Deshmukh =

Indian social reformer (1916–2010)

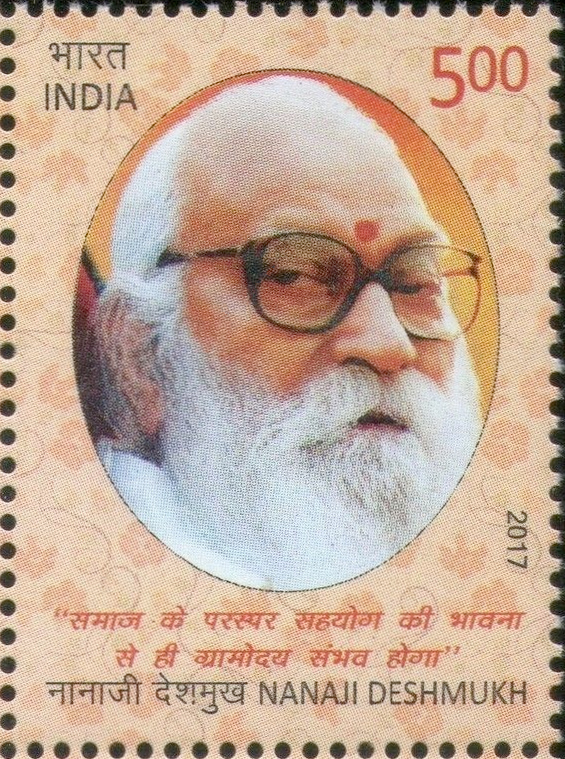
- Deshmukh on a 2017 stamp of India

Member of Parliament, Rajya Sabha
- In office 22 November 1999 – 21 November 2005
- Constituency: Nominated

Member of Parliament, Lok Sabha
- In office 1977–1980
- Preceded by: Chandra Bhal Mani Tiwari
- Succeeded by: Chandra Bhal Mani Tiwari
- Constituency: Balrampur, Uttar Pradesh

Personal details
- Born: Chandikadas Amritrao Deshmukh; 11 October 1916 Kadoli, Hyderabad State, British India (present-day Maharashtra, India)
- Died: 27 February 2010 (aged 93) Chitrakoot, Madhya Pradesh, India
- Party: Bharatiya Jana Sangh
- Education: Birla Institute of Technology and Science, Pilani
- Awards: Bharat Ratna (January 2019); Padma Vibhushan (1999)

Chandikadas Amritrao Deshmukh (11 October 1916 – 27 February 2010), better known as Nanaji Deshmukh, was an Indian social activist and politician. He worked in the fields of education, health, and rural self-reliance. He was posthumously awarded the Bharat Ratna, India's highest civilian award in 2019 by the Government of India. He was a leader of the Bharatiya Jana Sangh (BJS), the precursor to the Bharatiya Janata Party (BJP), alongside being a member of the Rashtriya Swayamsevak Sangh (RSS), a right-wing Hindutva paramilitary organisation.

== Early life ==
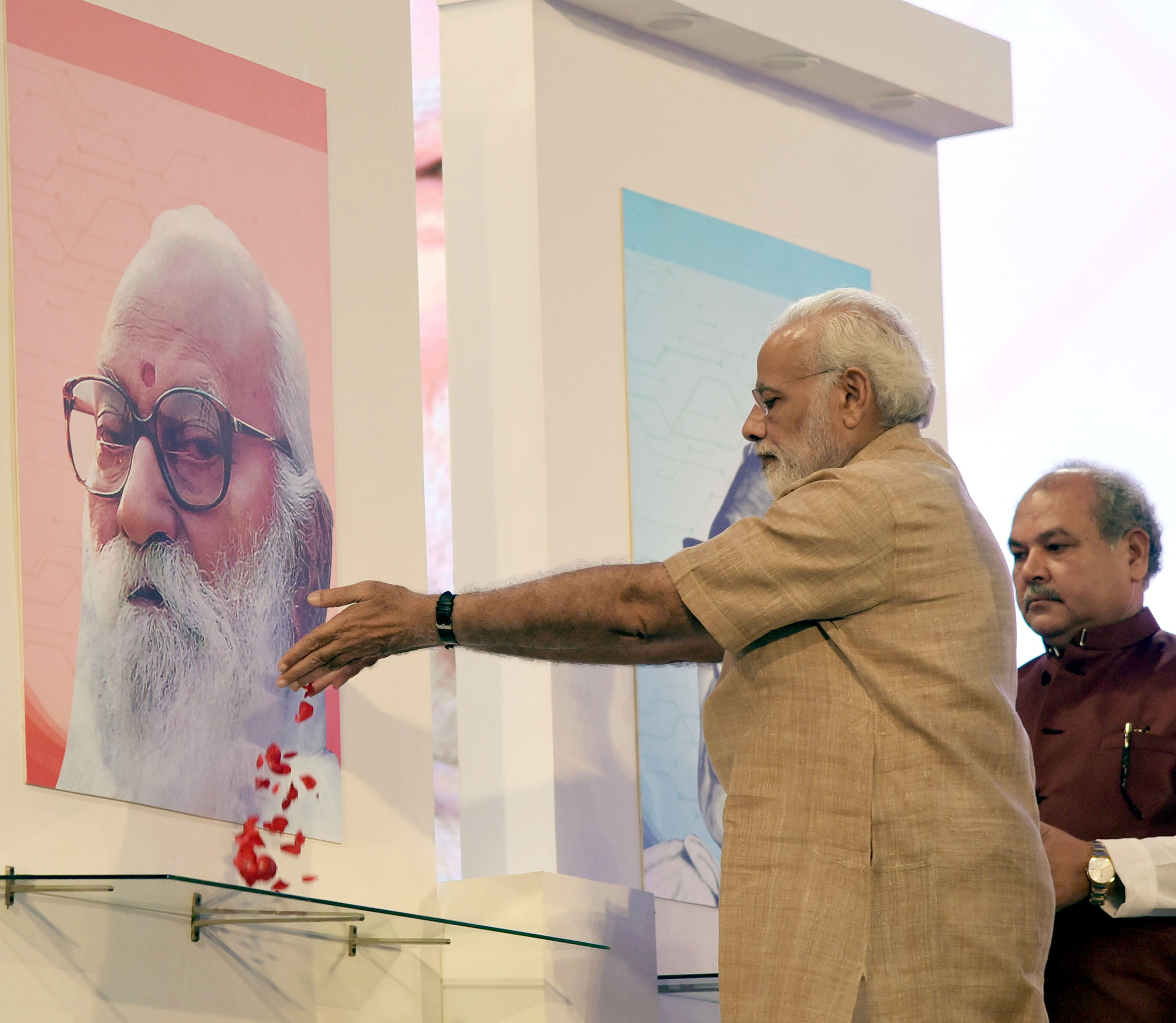
Prime minister Narendra Modi paying floral tributes to Deshmukh on the birth centenary celebrations, at IARI, New Delhi on 11 October 2017

Nanaji was born on 11 October 1916 into a Marathi family in Parbhani district, Hyderabad State, British India. He worked as a vegetable seller to raise money for his education.

He went to high school in Sikar, where he attained a scholarship. He studied in Birla College. As a child, he was inspired by Bal Gangadhar Tilak.

Then RSS chief M. S. Golwalkar sent him to Gorakhpur as Pracharak (full-time functionary). He rose to be the Saha Prant Pracharak of the whole of Uttar Pradesh.

== RSS volunteer ==
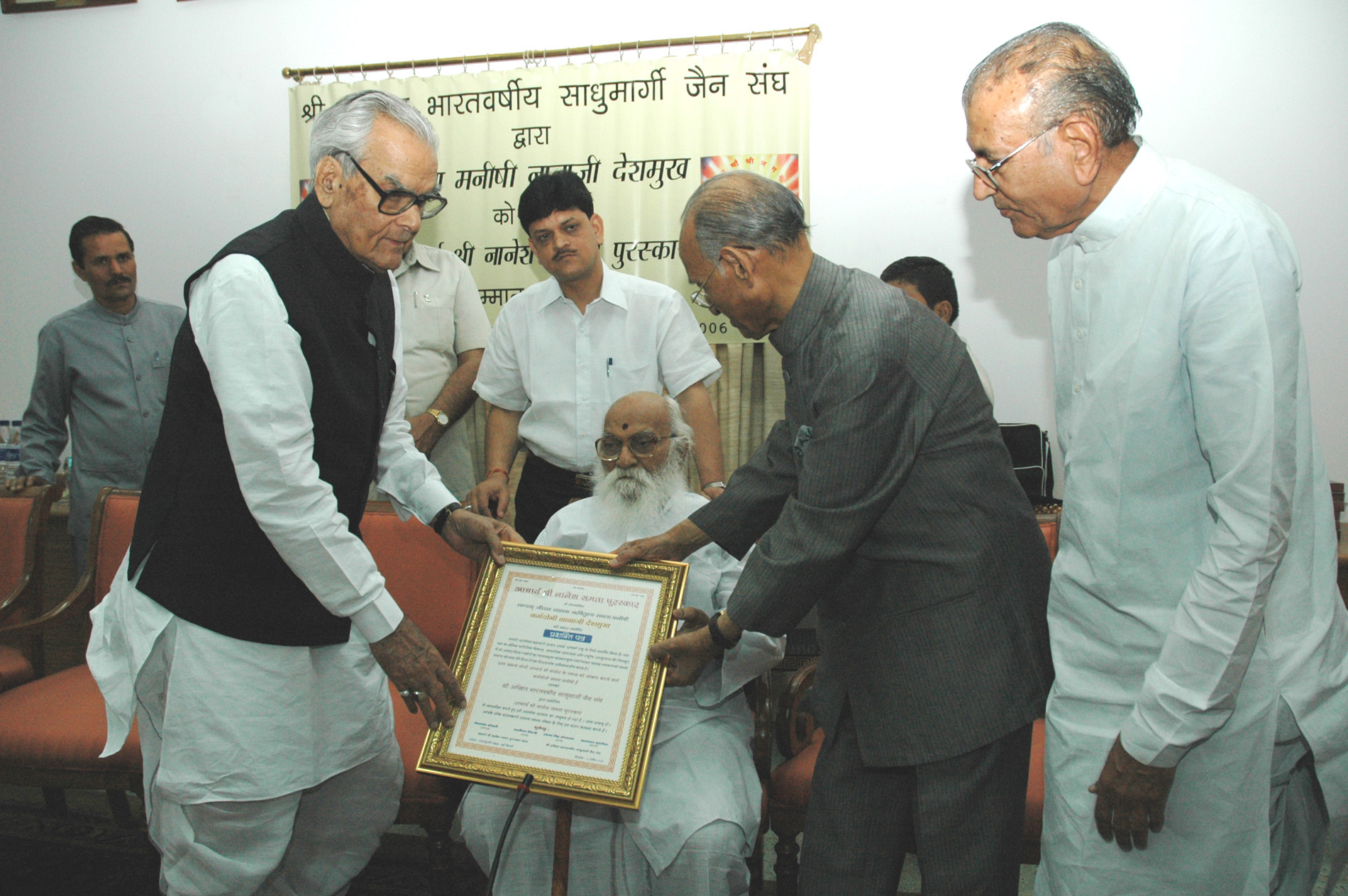
The Vice President, Bhairon Singh Shekhawat presenting Shri Nanesh Samata Puraskar to Shri Nanaji Deshmukh, in New Delhi on 8 April 2006.

Deshmukh's family had always had been in close contact with K. B. Hedgewar, the founder of the RSS and an activist for Hindutva, a Hindu nationalist ideology.

In 1940, after Hedgewar's death, Deshmukh joined the RSS. He was sent to Uttar Pradesh as a Pracharak. At Agra, he met Deendayal Upadhyaya, the leader of the BJS. Later, he had to stay in a Dharmashala but had to keep on changing Dharmashalas as no one was allowed to stay there for more than three days consecutively. Ultimately, he was given shelter by Baba Raghav Das, reportedly on condition that he would cook meals for him.

Within three years, almost 250 Sangh Shakhas commenced in and around Gorakhpur. He established India's first Vidya Bharati, the educational wing of the RSS, in Gorakhpur in 1950.

When in 1947, the RSS decided to launch two journals (Rashtradharma and Panchjanya) as well as a newspaper, Swadesh, Deshmukh was given the role of the managing director.

Following the assassination of Mahatma Gandhi in 1948 by Nathuram Godse, the organisation faced significant political backlash, culminating in a government-imposed ban. In response to this political crackdown, the organisation adopted a more covert approach to continue disseminating its ideological materials. Deshmukh emerged as a key figure during this period, playing a central role in orchestrating underground publication efforts.

== Political life ==
When the ban on the RSS was lifted and the BJS came into being, Deshmukh was asked by Golwalkar to take charge of the party in Uttar Pradesh as a general secretary.

Deshmukh's groundwork was a great help in strengthening the BJS at the grassroots. His relations with Ram Manohar Lohia helped bring the BJS closer to other socialist parties in the country. Lohia and Deshmukh's association led to the first non-Congress coalition government in Uttar Pradesh after the 1967 state elections.

Later, Morarji Desai, who became the prime minister heading the Janata Party government offered him the Cabinet portfolio of Industry, but Deshmukh declined the offer. Deshmukh had won in the 1977 election held after revocation of the Emergency with a comfortable margin from the Balrampur Lok Sabha constituency of Uttar Pradesh.

He was nominated to the Rajya Sabha by the NDA coalition government, under prime minister Atal Bihari Vajpayee, in 1999.

== Social work ==
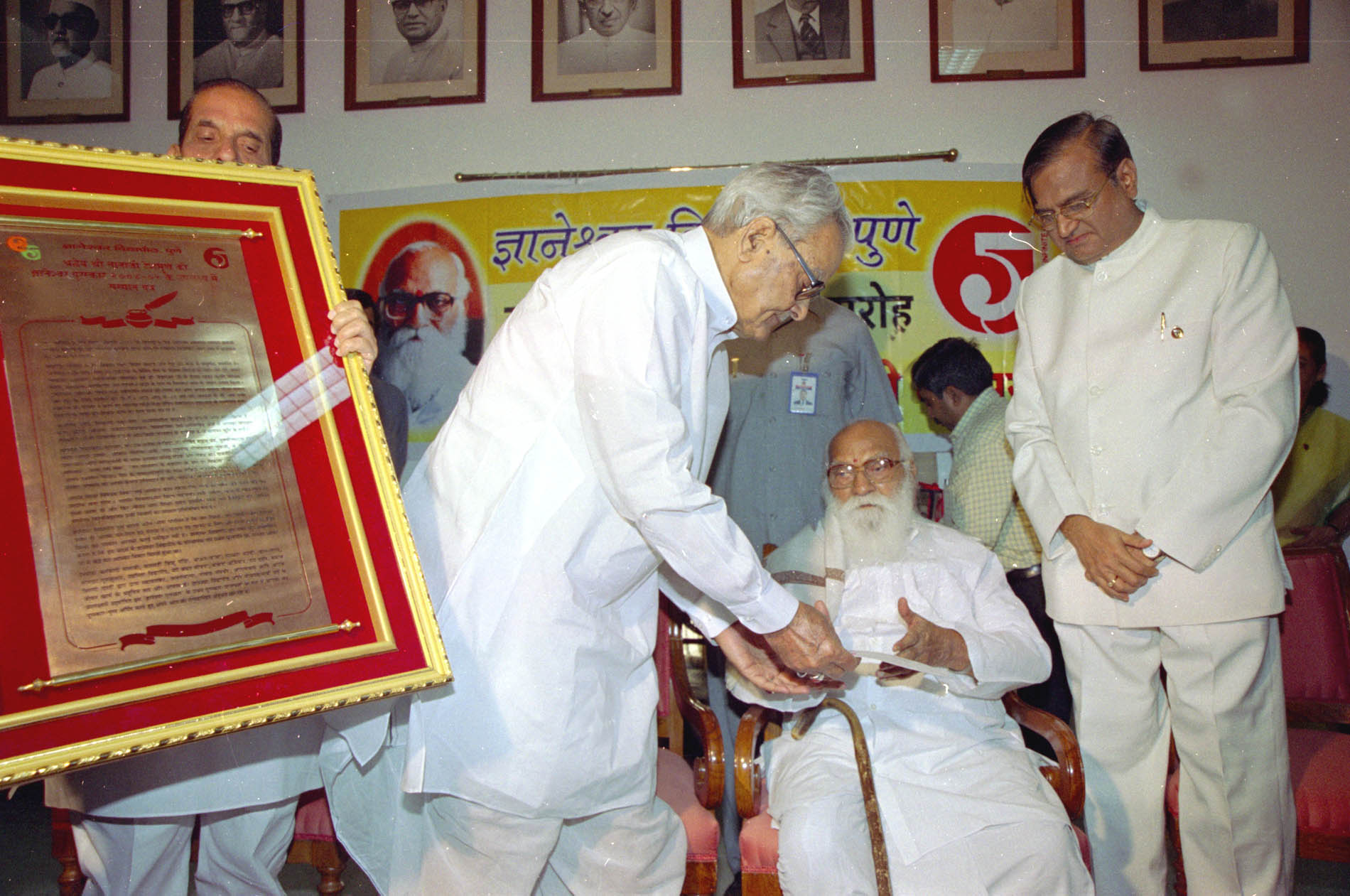
The Vice President Shri Bhairon Singh Shekhawat conferring the 'Dnyaneswar Award' to noted & veteran social worker Shri Nanaji Deshmukh, in New Delhi on 1 June 2005.

Following his retirement from active political life, Nanaji Deshmukh dedicated himself to the work of the Deendayal Research Institute, an organisation he had founded in 1969.

He did work towards the anti-poverty and minimum needs programme. Other areas of his work were agriculture and cottage industry, rural health and rural education. Deshmukh assumed chairmanship of the institute after leaving politics and devoted all his time to building up the institute. He was also instrumental in carrying out social restructuring programme in over 500 villages of both Uttar Pradesh and Madhya Pradesh states of India.

He also established Chitrakoot Gramoday Vishwavidyalaya in Chitrakoot, India's first rural University, and served as its Chancellor.

== Awards and recognition ==
Deshmukh was awarded India's second highest civilian award, the Padma Vibhushan, in 1999, by Vajpayee's BJP government. In 2019, he was posthumously awarded India's highest civilian award, the Bharat Ratna, by Narendra Modi's BJP government.

== Death ==
Deshmukh died on 27 February 2010 in the premises of Mahatma Gandhi Chitrakoot Gramodaya Vishwavidyalaya that he established. He was unwell for some time due to old age and had refused to be taken to Delhi for treatment. He bequeathed his body to the Dadhichi Dehdaan Sanstha of New Delhi, and so his body was sent to the All India Institutes of Medical Sciences for medical research.

== See also ==
- Vidya Bharati
- Indian nationalism
- Deendayal Upadhyaya
- Vinayak Damodar Savarkar
- L. K. Advani
- Balraj Madhok
- Rashtriya Swayamsevak Sangh
