= Sikander Bakht =

Indian politician (1918–2004)

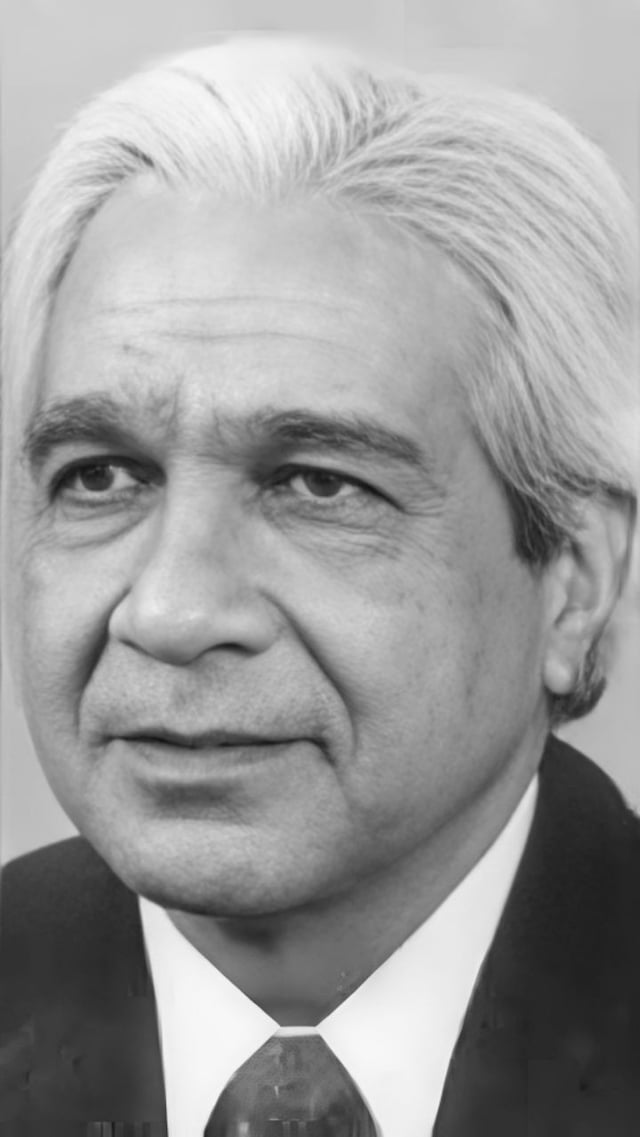

Minister of External Affairs
- In office 21 May 1996 – 1 June 1996
- Preceded by: Pranab Mukherjee
- Succeeded by: I. K. Gujral

Leader of the Opposition in Rajya Sabha
- In office 7 July 1992 – 21 May 1996
- Preceded by: S. Jaipal Reddy
- Succeeded by: Shankarrao Chavan
- In office 1 June 1996 – 19 March 1998
- Preceded by: Shankarrao Chavan
- Succeeded by: Dr. Manmohan Singh

Member of the Indian Parliament for Chandni Chowk
- In office 1977–1980
- Preceded by: Subhadra Joshi
- Succeeded by: Bhiku Ram Jain

15th Governor of Kerala
- In office 18 April 2002 - 23 February 2004

Minister of Commerce and Industry
- In office 19 March 1998 – 13 October 1999
- Preceded by: Murasoli Maran
- Succeeded by: Murasoli Maran

Minister of Housing Affairs
- In office 21 May 1996 – 1 June 1996
- Preceded by: P. V. Narasimha Rao
- Succeeded by: M. Arunachalam

Personal details
- Born: 24 August 1918 Delhi, British India
- Died: 23 February 2004 (aged 85) Thiruvananthapuram, Kerala, India
- Party: Bharatiya Janata Party (after 1980)
- Other political affiliations: JP (1977–1980); Congress (O) (1969–1977); INC (before 1969)
- Children: 2
- Education: Zakir Husain College Delhi University

Sikander Bakht (24 August 1918 – 23 February 2004) was an Indian politician. He served as Vice President of the BJP, served as its leader in the Rajya Sabha and was a cabinet minister in the NDA government headed by Atal Bihari Vajpayee. He also served as 15th governor of Kerala from 2002 until his death. In 2000, he was awarded Padma Vibhushan, the second highest civilian honour of the Government of India.

== Early life ==
Sikander Bakht was born to a Muslim family born in Delhi on August 24, 1918. His father was Nafiz Mohamed Yusuf, a tobacconist, and his mother N Begum Yusuf. He attended the Anglo Arabic Senior Secondary School, Delhi and completed his Bachelor of Science from the Anglo-Arabic College (now known as Zakir Husain College) in Delhi. During his school and college days he was a hockey player and represented Delhi University and Delhi in various tournaments. He also played and captained the Independents Hockey Club.

== Career ==
By 1945, Bakht was a clerk in Supply Department of the Government of India. He did social work with Jamiat Ulema-e-Hind. Then he became personal secretary to Chief Minister Chaudhary Prakash. He was part of Shanti Dal, a socialist wing of Congress, and Friends of New Kashmir Committee. He was initiated into politics by Subhadra Joshi. In 1952, Bakht was elected to the Municipal Corporation of Delhi as a Congress candidate. Around this time, he was accused by Organiser of being a commander in Muslim League's National Guards, misappropriation of properties of refugee and having an affair with Subhadra Joshi.

In 1968, he was elected as the Chairman of Delhi Electric Supply Undertaking. In 1969 the Congress party split and Bakht stayed with Congress (O). Bakht was then elected to The Metropolitan Council of Delhi as a Congress (O) candidate. On 25 June 1975, Emergency was declared by Prime Minister Indira Gandhi, Bakht along with other opposition leaders was imprisoned on 25 June 1975. He was lodged in the Rohtak Jail until his release in December 1976. Prime Minister Indira Gandhi ordered General Elections in March 1977. As soon as the opposition leaders were released, they merged all opposition parties to form Janata Party and Bakht became a leader in Janata Party.

In March 1977, Bakht was elected to the Lok Sabha as a Janata Party candidate, from Chandni Chowk defeating Subhadra Joshi. The election turnout was 82.98% and Bakht got 71.91% of the vote. Morarji Desai was appointed prime minister and he appointed Bakht as a Cabinet Minister for Works, Housing, Supply and Rehabilitation. He served in this capacity till July 1979.

In 1980, the Janta Party split and Bakht opted to be with the Bharatiya Janata Party (BJP). He was inspired by his mother who years earlier argued him to join Jan Sangh after witnessing its grassroot zeal. He became good friends with Atal Bihari Vajpayee during Emergency. He was appointed General Secretary of BJP. He was a part of three-member committee consisting of him, Sunder Singh Bhandari and Ram Jethmalani that drafted the party's constitution. In 1984 he was made the Vice President of BJP. He lost two elections from Chandni Chowk as BJP candidate.

In 1990, Bakht was elected to the Rajya Sabha from Madhya Pradesh. In 1992 he became the Leader of Opposition in the Rajya Sabha. In 1993, in the aftermath of Ayodhya incident, Bakht was arrested. On 10 April 1996 he was reelected from Madhya Pradesh to the Rajya Sabha.

In May 1996, during the first Atal Bihari Vajpayee Ministry, Bakht was initially offered Minister of Urban Affairs but he wasn't happy with it. He felt that that the hard-liners in the party didn't want to give him a important position and thus didn't attend the office. One week later, he was offered Minister of External Affairs. He was in the position for only one week as Vajpayee government collapsed. Bakht became the Leader of the Opposition in the Rajya Sabha once again.

In 1997, he had disagreements with other BJP leaders over who is to be Party President of BJP and rules regarding it. He believed that there should be only one term and that term should be of five years. His suggestions were not implemented. He was initially interested in becoming Party President but later nominated Sunder Singh Bhandari. He also called for abolishment of BJP's Minority Cell.

In 1998, Vajpayee was again appointed prime minister and Bakht was appointed Industry Minister, a post he held until 2002. His open defiance of the BJP norms during Vajpayee's election as leader of the National Democratic Alliance led to him being sidelined. In addition, he was appointed the Leader of the House in Rajya Sabha. Murli Manohar Joshi tried to replace Bakht as the Leader but his plan thwarted by Advani-Vajpayee. He lost his seat to Maya Singh, a BJP spokesperson. After serving an entire term as Industry Minister, Bakht retired from active politics on 9 April 2002 and few days later was appointed the Governor of Kerala. He was the first BJP leader ever to be appointed the governor of Kerala and was the oldest Governor of Kerela. He was highly popular and served in this post until his death.

== Personal life ==
In 1952, he was married to Raj Sharma, a Hindu Brahmin refugee woman. Their marriage however was opposed by Sharma's father who filed an injunction to stop the wedding and gained support from Hindu-right organizations like Hindu Mahasabha. This led to protests, riots and attacks on Qureshi community of Delhi. Due to this, at least 1 person died and 17 others were wounded while 11 Hindus were arrested. They had two sons - Anil Bakht and Sunil Bakht. Anil is married to a Kashmiri Pandit and Sunil to a Sikh.

== Awards ==
In 2000, Bakht was awarded the Padma Vibhushan. This is the second highest Indian civilian award. It is speculated that the award was given to appease Bakht as he was critical of his exclusion from important government positions. The four other persons from the BJP who have been awarded the Padma Vibhushan are Atal Bihari Vajpayee, Lal Krishna Advani, Sushma Swaraj and Arun Jaitley. Atal Bihari Vajpayee and Lal Krishna Advani have since been awarded the Bharat Ratna, the highest civilian award of India.

== Death ==
Bakht died at Medical College Hospital, Thiruvananthapuram on 23 February 2004, from complications of intestinal surgery. He was the first Governor of Kerala who died in office. State government declared seven-day mourning and one-day holiday. He was replaced two days later by Karnataka governor T. N. Chaturvedi. There was concern, particularly among BJP members, that Bakht might have died because of medical negligence, but nothing was proven. Chief Minister A. K. Antony, at the time of Sikander Bakht's death, had to give into popular demand to order an inquiry to examine if there was any lapse on part of doctors or any other motive.

The President of India, A. P. J. Abdul Kalam, said "In his death we have lost a prominent public personality and a statesman." Prime Minister Vajpayee said "Mr. Bakht was a freedom-fighter. He struggled for democracy and the nationalist cause with courage and conviction. He rendered distinguished service as a member of my Cabinet for sometime."

RSS Sarsanghchalak, K. S. Sudarshan, described him in the Organiser as "an upright man of principles who had an affable temperament and endeared himself to all those who came in contact with him."

BJP's silver jubilee celebration book, Political Resolutions, 1980-2005, was dedicated to “the memory of Shri Sikandar Bakht”.

In 2011, Nawab Road in Bara Hindu Rao area near Sadar Bazar was renamed Sikandar Bakht Road. In 2021, BJP held pan-India events to mark Bakht's birth anniversary.

== See also ==
- Arif Beg
- Farooq Khan
- Sikander Bakht's interview

Preceded by Pranab Mukherjee	Minister for External Affairs of India; 1996–1996	Succeeded by Inder Kumar Gujral
