= Vijay Kumar Malhotra =

Indian politician (1931–2025)

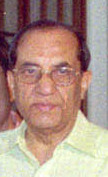

Leader of Opposition Delhi Legislative Assembly
- In office 2008–2013
- Preceded by: Madan Lal Khurana
- Succeeded by: Harsh Vardhan
- Constituency: Greater Kailash, New Delhi

President of Indian Olympic Association (Acting)
- In office 26 April 2011 – 5 December 2012
- Preceded by: Suresh Kalmadi
- Succeeded by: Abhay Singh Chautala

Leader of the Opposition in Delhi Metropolitan Council
- In office 1972–1977
- Preceded by: Shiv Charan Gupta
- Succeeded by: Dharam Dass Shastri

Personal details
- Born: 3 December 1931 Lahore, Punjab, British India (Present-day Lahore, Punjab, Pakistan)
- Died: 30 September 2025 (aged 93) New Delhi, India
- Party: BJP
- Spouse: Krishna Malhotra
- Children: 2
- Website: vkmalhotra
- As of 16 September, 2006

Vijay Kumar Malhotra (3 December 1931 – 30 September 2025) was an Indian politician and a sport administrator. He belonged to the Bharatiya Janata Party.

Malhotra was born in Lahore city of Punjab Province in British India, which is now in Pakistan. He was the 4th out of the seven children of Kaviraj Khazan Chand. He represented Delhi Sadar and South Delhi constituencies in the National Capital Territory of Delhi in the 9th Lok Sabha and the 14th Lok Sabha respectively. In 2026, Malhotra was posthumously awarded the Padma Bhushan, India's third highest civilian honour.

== Career ==
Malhotra had a long active career in politics; Chief Executive Councillor of Delhi's Metropolitan Council (Chief Minister equivalent, 1967), President of the Janata Party, Delhi (1977) and BJP, Delhi (1980–84). Along with Mr Kidar Nath Sahani and Madan Lal Khurana, Malhotra was credited with keeping BJP afloat in Delhi for many years.

His biggest political victory was defeating the former Prime Minister of India Manmohan Singh in the 1999 Indian general election by a huge margin. Malhotra was a 5-time MP and 2-time MLA from Delhi, over the past 45 years, making him one of BJP's senior-most figures in the capital.

In the 2004 Indian general election, Malhotra was the only BJP candidate to win his seat in Delhi, with the Congress winning the other 6 seats. Malhotra enjoyed a spotless and clean image throughout his distinguished career, and even at the age of 82, despite not being offered a post by the Narendra Modi government, he offered to become BJP's election campaign chairman for Delhi and led the party to a whitewash victory, securing all 7 seats.

Malhotra was also an educationist. He held a Doctorate in Hindi Literature. Besides politics and social work, Malhotra was also involved with the administration of the chess and archery clubs in Delhi.

=== Sports administration ===
Malhotra was the Senior Vice-President of the Indian Olympic Association and the acting President of the IOA since 27 April 2011, after Suresh Kalmadi was arrested by the CBI in connection with the alleged irregularities in awarding contracts for the 2010 Commonwealth Games.

He was also the president of the General Association of National Sports Federations and the president of the Archery Association of India since last 44 years. He was also associated with the organisation of the 2010 Commonwealth Games held in New Delhi.

In October 2015, Malhotra was named as the Chairman of the All Indian Council of Sports (AICS), and was given the rank of a minister of state.

== Chief ministerial candidate ==
On 26 September 2008 the BJP announced that Malhotra would be party's chief ministerial candidate in the election to Delhi Assembly in 2008.

While Malhotra easily won his Greater Kailash constituency, the BJP failed to dislodge the Sheila Dikshit government. Only days after election results were revealed, Malhotra was in attendance in the Lok Sabha, fuelling speculation that he intended to continue in Parliament, instead of serving in the Delhi Legislative Assembly. However he resigned as Member of Parliament and retained his seat of an MLA in Delhi and would serve as Leader of opposition.

== Death ==
Malhotra died at AIIMS Delhi on 30 September 2025, at the age of 93.

Lok Sabha
Preceded by Shashi Bhushan	Member of Parliament for South Delhi; 1977 - 1980	Succeeded by Charanjit Singh Atwal
Preceded by Jagdish Tytler	Member of Parliament for Delhi Sadar; 1989 - 1991	Succeeded by Jagdish Tytler
Preceded by Sushma Swaraj	Member of Parliament for South Delhi; 1999 - 2009	Succeeded by Ramesh Kumar
Civic offices
Preceded by Suresh Kalmadi	Acting President of Indian Olympic Association; 2011–2012	Succeeded by Abhay Singh Chautala
