= Bhai Mahavir =

Indian politician

- Dr. Bhai Mahavir

12th Governor of Madhya Pradesh
- In office 22 April 1998 – 7 May 2003
- Chief Minister: Digvijaya Singh
- Preceded by: Mohammad Shafi Qureshi
- Succeeded by: Ram Prakash Gupta

Personal details
- Born: 30 October 1921 Lahore, Punjab, British India
- Died: 3 December 2016 (aged 94) New Delhi, India
- Party: Bharatiya Janata Party
- Spouse: Krishna Kumari
- Children: 2 (One : Pratibha Sharma)
- Parent: Bhai Parmanand (father)
- Education: University of Delhi

Bhai Mahavir (30 October 1922 – 3 December 2016) was an Indian politician who was governor of the Indian state of Madhya Pradesh between April 1998 and March 2003. He was a pracharak of the Rashtriya Swayamsevak Sangh (RSS) and served as a leader of the Bharatiya Jana Sangh and Bharatiya Janata Party. He has authored many books and had served two terms prior to his governorship as a member of the Rajya Sabha. He had an M.A. and Ph.D. in economics and studied law (LLB) from the University of Delhi.

== Life and career ==
Bhai Mahavir was the son of Bhai Parmanand, a Mohyal (Saraswat Brahmin), member of Arya Samaj and a leader of the Hindu Mahasabha. He grew up with an Arya Samaj background and went to study at the Dayanand Anglo-Vedic College in Lahore. His ancestors were famous martyrs of Sikhism i.e. Bhai Matidas and Bhai Satidas.

Mahavir joined the RSS in 1938, in a shakha established by Raja Bhau Paturkar in Lahore. He became a pracharak in 1942, and worked in that capacity in Jalandhar for 2 years. Between 1944 and 1947 he was the Secretary of RSS in Lahore. After the partition, he settled down in Jalandhar and worked as a lecturer. He moved to Delhi in 1956, working as a lecturer in the Panjab University College established for the Panjabi refugees.

Towards the end of 1950, Shyama Prasad Mookerjee gathered in Delhi a core group of activists to form a new political party, the future Bharatiya Jana Sangh. Bhai Mahavir was among this group, along with Vasantrao Oak and Balraj Madhok, all RSS Pracharaks. The three of them founded the Panjab-Delhi branch of the Jana Sangh in Jalandhar on 27 May 1951, which later became part of the nationwide `Bharatiya' Jana Sangh established on 21 October. Mahavir was named a General Secretary of the nationwide party. He served in that capacity for one year, succeeded by Deendayal Upadhyaya in 1952. He continued on the Working Committee of the Jana Sangh, along with several other RSS leaders who controlled the policy line of Jana Sangh. After the death of Mookerjee in 1953, the RSS members of the Working Committee forced out the next elected President Mauli Chandra Sharma, in effect taking full control of the Jana Sangh.

Mahavir continued in senior positions in the Jana Sangh and later in Bharatiya Janata Party. He was elected to the Rajya Sabha during 1968-74 and 1978–84. In 1998, he was appointed the Governor of Madhya Pradesh and served a full term till 2003.

== Personal life ==
Bhai Mahavir had two daughters and three grandchildren. He was married to Krishna Kumari who died in New Delhi on 14 December 2012. Bhai Mahavir died at his home in Delhi on 3 December 2016.
