= Satyapriya Banerjee =

Indian politician and trade unionist

Satyapriya Banerjee (born 25 August 1893, d. 1957) was an Indian politician and trade unionist. He founded Marxist Forward Bloc in 1953.

== Early years ==
Banerjee went to Berlin for studies, and obtained Bachelor of Arts and Bachelor of Laws degrees. In 1920 he founded the Samaj Sevak Sangh. In 1928 he became the founding secretary of the All Bengal Youth Association.

== Struggle for Independence ==
Banerjee served as secretary of the Bengal Provincial Congress Committee. Working closely with Subhas Chandra Bose, he left the Indian National Congress along with Bose and founded the All India Forward Bloc (in which Banerjee became secretary). Banerjee was a member of the Bengal Legislative Assembly between 1937 and 1945, and a member of the Central Legislative Assembly 1946–1947. During the Partition Banerjee was active in the United Central Refugee Council.

== Trade unionist ==
Banerjee served as president of the Bengal Provincial Trade Union Congress and vice-president of the All India Trade Union Congress.

== Bowbazar election ==
Banerjee stood as a candidate in Bowbazar in the 1952 West Bengal Legislative Assembly election. His candidature was supported by different left parties. Banerjee was defeated by the Congress candidate Bidhan Chandra Roy. Roy obtained 13,910 votes, whilst Banerjee got 9,799 votes (41.33%). The day following the elections, riots broke out.

== Split in the Forward Bloc ==
He was elected to the Rajya Sabha in the same year, and remained in that post until 1956. Inside the party, Banerjee was a prominent member of the left-wing tendency. The party was torn on the issue of cooperation with the Communist Party of India. The conflict escalated during the by-election in Calcutta South East Lok Sabha constituency (called after the death of incumbent Syama Prasad Mookerjee). Banerjee's group supported the Communist Party Sadhan Gupta candidate rather than the official Forward Bloc candidate. Banerjee was expelled from the party, along with Amar Bose and Suhurit Chaudhury, by the Working Committee of the All India Forward Bloc. At the time Banerjee was the sole national parliamentarian of the party. Banerjee and the other expellees founded the Marxist Forward Bloc in April 1954.
