= Pandit Deendayal Upadhyay Indoor Stadium =

Indoor stadium in Surat, Gujarat, India

- Indoor Stadium
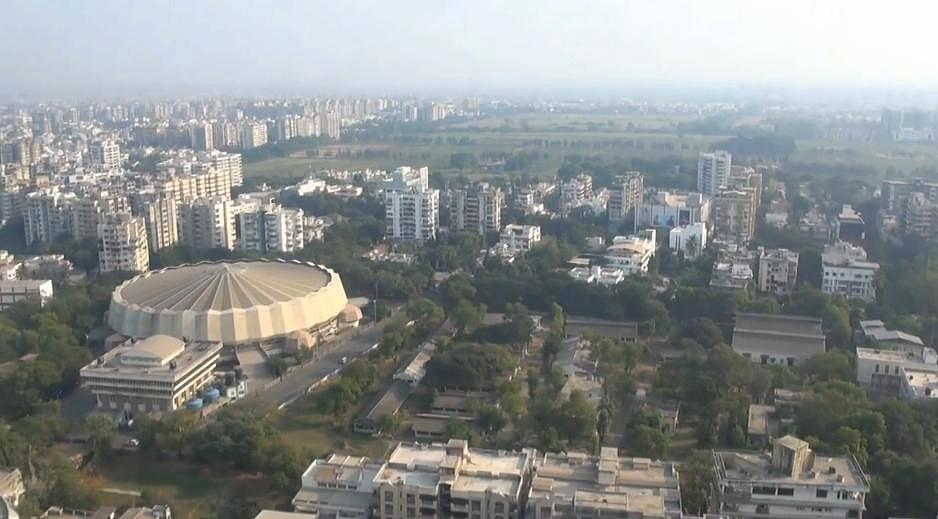
- Pandit DinDayal Upadhyay Indoor Stadium, Surat
- Interactive map of Pandit Deendayal Upadhyay Indoor Stadium
- Location: Ghod Dod Road, Surat
- Coordinates: 21.1767°N 72.8011°E
- Owner: Surat Municipal Corporation
- Operator: Surat Municipal Corporation
- Capacity: 7,000

Construction
- Opened: 1998
- Cost: ₹ 21 crores

Pandit Deendayal Upadhyay Indoor Stadium is located at Ghod Dod Road, Surat, Gujarat, India. It was built by Surat Municipal Corporation in 1998 at the cost of ₹ 21 crores. Named after the veteran Jana Sangh leader, Deendayal Upadhyaya, it was the first Indoor Sports Complex to be constructed in Western India.

== See also ==
- List of tourist attractions in Surat
