= 1953 Calcutta South East by-election =

Calcutta South East seat in the Lok Sabha by-election, 1953
Candidate	Sadhan Gupta	Radhabinod Pal
Party	CPI	INC
Popular vote	58,211	36,319
Percentage	58.20%	36.31%

In 1953, a by-election was held for the Calcutta South East seat in the Lok Sabha (Lower House of the Parliament of India). The by-election was called after the death of the incumbent parliamentarian from Calcutta South East, Syama Prasad Mukherjee. The election saw the internationally renowned barrister Radhabinod Pal defeated by a young communist barrister Sadhan Gupta.

== Background ==
In the 1951–1952 Indian parliamentary election, the Calcutta South East seat had been won by the Bharatiya Jan Sangh leader Syama Prasad Mukherjee. But, a by-election was called in 1953 to fill the vacancy after Mukherjee died. Mukherjee, a right-wing nationalist hardliner on the Kashmir conflict, had been detained in June 1953 whilst trying to enter Kashmir. Whilst detained, he suffered a heart attack and died. Due to the dramatic circumstances of Mukherjee's death and the complexity of the Calcutta politics (whilst the constituency was seen as a Congress stronghold it had also elected a Bharatiya Jan Sabha MP as well as communist members of the West Bengal Legislative Assembly), the by-poll caught attention in national politics.

== Candidates ==
Four candidates contested the by-poll, all fielded by national political parties.

=== Indian National Congress ===
Ahead of the by-poll, the Indian National Congress contacted Radhabinod Pal to convince him to stand as their candidate. Notably Pal had been a long-time associate of Mukherjee and sharp critic of the Congress Party. Reportedly, Pal initially rejected the offer but was later convinced. Pal's conditions for accepting the candidacy included a promise that Pal neither would have to campaign for himself in any major extent nor spend any money of his own on the campaign. Pal, who was a prominent jurist, served in the International Military Tribunal for the Far East and was in Japan between 26 September and 7 November 1953. Considering Pal's recognition as a jurist, the newspaper Ananda Bazaar Patrika expected that Pal would emerge victorious in the by-poll.

=== Communist Party of India ===
Pal's main challenger was another barrister. Whilst Pal was a senior jurist with international recognition, his opponent was a young lawyer linked to the labour movement. Sadhan Gupta had positioned himself in the legal community through the 1945 case "Emperor vs Shibnath Banerjee" and represented many persons affected by preventive detentions. Gupta, who was blind, stood on a Communist Party of India ticket. His father was a member of the West Bengal Legislative Assembly at the time, representing the Indian National Congress.

The CPI election campaign highlighted Pal's sudden shift in political affiliation, reminding voters that Pal used to be an opponent of the Congress government.

=== Bharatiya Jan Sangh ===
Mukherjee's party fielded Jasho Prakash Mitter as its candidate. A Bengali Hindu refugee from the Partition of India, Mitter was a prominent barrister in Calcutta. He had represented the British Crown in the 1930s Meerut Conspiracy Case. He had also defended accused at the Red Fort trial. At the time of the by-poll Mitter was the president of the Council for the Protection of the Rights of Minorities, a body with links to the Hindu Mahasabha. The organisation called for carving out a separate territory for Hindus in East Pakistan and was organising a paramilitary body amongst Hindu refugees.

=== Forward Bloc (Marxist Group) ===
Another party in the fray was the Forward Bloc (Marxist Group). The FB(MG) candidate Bhupal Bose was supported by sectors of the non-communist left. Bose was a veteran revolutionary leader and former prisoner at the Andaman jail. However, within the FB(MG) there was a sector (including leaders such as Satyapriya Banerjee, Amar Bose, Suhrid Mallick Chowdhury and Ram Chatterjee) that argued in favour of support to the CPI candidate. During the election campaign they worked for the CPI candidate rather than the one nominated by the FB(MG). The by-poll provoked a split in the party as the Working Committee of the party expelled the pro-communist group. The expelled group later formed the Marxist Forward Bloc in April the following year.

== Results ==
The vote was held on 22 November 1953. A by-election was held on the same day in another West Bengal Lok Sabha seat, Nabadwip. The result from the Calcutta South East by-poll was published on 27 November 1953. Gupta won the election, having received 58,211 votes (58.21%). Pal finished in second place with 36,319 votes (36.31%), J.P. Mitter of Bharatiya Jan Sangh obtained 5,431 votes (5.43%) and Bhupal Bose of the Forward Bloc (Marxist Group) got 5,415 votes (5.41%). Bose and Mitter forfeited their deposits.
