= Upadhaya =

Upadhaya is a surname. Notable people with the surname include:

- Dip Kumar Upadhaya, Nepali politician
- Priyankar Upadhaya, Indian activist
- Deendayal Upadhyaya
