= Mauli Chandra Sharma =

Indian politician

President of the Bharatiya Jana Sangh
- In office 1952–1954
- Preceded by: Syama Prasad Mookerjee
- Succeeded by: Prem Nath Dogra

Personal details
- Born: Delhi, British India
- Party: Indian National Congress, Bharatiya Jana Sangh
- Parent: Deen Dayal Sharma (father)
- Education: Hindu College
- Profession: Lawyer; Politician

Mauli Chandra Sharma (M. C. Sharma) was a senior Indian politician, originally of the Indian National Congress. He was a founding member of the Bharatiya Jana Sangh, the political arm of the Rashtriya Swayamsevak Sangh (RSS), a far-right Hindutva paramilitary organisation. He served as the party's Vice-President and President, before being forced out by the RSS in 1954.

== Life and early career ==
M. C. Sharma is the son of Pandit Deen Dayal Sharma, a sanathanist Sanskrit scholar, promoter of the Hindu Mahasabha in the 1920s and an associate of Madan Mohan Malaviya. Mauli Chandra grew up in Delhi and attended the Hindu College. He went on to study law, but gave that up in 1923 to join political activity.

Sharma had been a member of the Indian National Congress up to the time of independence. He worked as the Chief Minister of a princely state and as the Secretary to the Chancellor of the Chamber of Princes. He attended the Round Table Conference in London in 1930 and 1931 as a member of the States delegation.

After 1947, he was active in the politics of Delhi and the surrounding areas. He had close ties with the Delhi unit of the Rashtriya Swayamsevak Sangh (RSS), including its pracharak Vasantrao Oak. He was impressed with the work of the RSS in rehabilitating the refugees of the Partition. When RSS was banned after the assassination of Mahatma Gandhi, he organised a civil rights group, Janadhikar Samiti, to campaign for lifting the ban. He was arrested for this activism under the Public Safety Act. He later acted as a mediator between the Home Minister Vallabhbhai Patel and the RSS chief M. S. Golwalkar to help reach an agreement on the constitution of the RSS.

== Bharatiya Jana Sangh ==
Towards the end of 1950, Shyama Prasad Mookerjee gathered in Delhi a core group of activists including M. C. Sharma for forming a new political party, the future Bharatiya Jana Sangh. Several other members of the core group were RSS pracharaks. Sharma played an active part in forming the Punjab-Delhi branch of Jana Sangh on 27 May 1951, which later became part of the nationwide `Bharatiya' Jana Sangh. He was named as a General Secretary of the nation-wide party, with the RSS pracharak Bhai Mahavir being the other General Secretary. This indicated an equitable sharing of influence in the Jana Sangh by the Hindu traditionalist politicians and the Hindutva RSS.

Jana Sangh had been formed on the eve of the first General Elections of 1951-52. The party won only 3 seats in the Lok Sabha, including that of Mookerjee. Sharma contested for the Lok Sabha seat from Outer Delhi, but lost. He secured 74,077 votes or 16 percent of the votes cast.

When Mookerjee died in June 1953, Sharma was appointed as the Acting President of the Jana Sangh. By this time, Deendayal Upadhyaya, another RSS pracharak from Uttar Pradesh was the General Secretary of the party, and had firm control of its RSS faction, enjoying the full confidence of the RSS chief M. S. Golwalkar. Sharma found his position weak even within the party's central office. There were discussions to merge Jana Sangh with the Hindu Mahasabha and Ram Rajya Parishad to form a single party representing the Hindu interests. A statement of Sharma calling the Hindu Mahasabha a 'communal body' is said to have broken off the negotiations. However, according to N. C. Chatterjee, the President of the Hindu Mahasabha, V. D. Savarkar blocked the merger proposals because he disliked Golwalkar and expected that the combined organisation would be dominated by the RSS.

Balraj Madhok, a member of the RSS faction in the Working Committee, warned in the RSS magazine Organiser that whoever became the next President of Jana Sangh would need to secure the "willing cooperation" of the RSS swayamsevaks in the Party. Being the Acting President, Sharma was a natural candidate for the Presidency. However, at the party's second plenary session in Bombay in 1953, Sharma was told upon his arrival that the RSS headquarters at Nagpur had decided in favour of another person and he was asked to stand down. Some party leaders threatened to take the matter to the open meeting, forcing the RSS faction to relent. Sharma was then given a full slate of the Working Committee members that he was asked to appoint, which also became a matter of contention. Despite his resistance, the eventual composition of the Working Committee was heavily weighted in favour of the RSS faction, including such RSS leaders as Bhai Mahavir, Jagannathrao Joshi, Nanaji Deshmukh, Atal Bihari Vajpayee, Balraj Madhok, Bhairon Singh Shekhawat and Sunder Singh Bhandari. Vasanthrao Oke, who was also an RSS pracharak, was not in the original list because he was seen by the RSS leadership to have become too close to the politicians. He was included upon Sharma's insistence.

Sharma and Oke made efforts to recruit party workers and also to raise funds from business to finance the expansion of the Party. These efforts were thwarted by the RSS faction because they saw it as an effort to reduce the party's dependence on the RSS. At the Indore session of the Central General Council in August, Sharma's Presidential address emphasised the principles laid down in the Party constitution, namely, "secular nationalism and unflinching faith in democracy." However, a fuss was raised that he was too uncritical of the Government. A delegate from Punjab brought forward a resolution condemning the interference of the RSS in party affairs, and it was decided to refer it to a further session of the Council.

However, Upadhyaya as the General Secretary refused to a call a second meeting of the Council and maintained that the decision belonged to the Working Committee, not the President. In response, Sharma resigned. According to Andersen and Damle, he anticipate the purge of the non-RSS party workers and tried to avert it. In a statement to The Statesman, Sharma stated that differences of opinion regarding interference by the RSS had been persistent for over a year. He confided that Shyama Prasad Mookerjee was "seriously perturbed" by the demands of the RSS leaders in the appointment of office-bearers, nomination of candidates and matters of policy. "A vigorous and calculated drive was launched to turn the Jana Sangh into a convenient handle of the RSS. Orders were issued from their headquarters through their emissaries and the Jana Sangh was expected to carry them out. Many workers and groups all over the country resented this and the Delhi State Jana Sangh as a body refused to comply."

Sharma hoped that his resignation and revelations about interference by the RSS would rally the party members. He also expected a meeting of the General Council to be called as it alone had the constitutional power to accept his resignation. However, the Working Committee accepted his resignation on its own and appointed Bapu Saheb Sohni, the RSS sanghchalak from Berar, as the Acting President. The Working Committee condemned what it described as Sharma's attempt "to abuse the Jana Sangh forum to try to run down the RSS." It called his actions undemocratic and unfair to the members of the Working Committee. Sharma was expelled from the party and the Delhi unit that backed him was summarily dissolved. Organiser informed its readers that Sharma suffered from "insufferable self-aggrandisement" and he was hardly the man to lead the great and growing organisation of the Jana Sangh.

Subsequently, Sharma rejoined the Congress Party. The Delhi unit officials formed a new party called the National Democratic Front, which lasted till 1957.

In a 1974 interview, Sharma clarified that he and his supporters were in sympathy of the basic aims of the RSS and that he greatly admired the work of the RSS in its efforts to strengthen the Hindu community. The main concerns were about the RSS domination of the Jana Sangh. He, like Mookerjee, wanted Jana Sangh to remain open to other influences and to use them for further growth. The young RSS organisers, on the other hand, were intent upon making the Jana Sangh more centralised and more disciplined, very much in the image of the RSS itself.

== Reactions ==
A. G. Noorani noted that in the succeeding years, Jana Sangh and its successor, Bharatiya Janata Party, forced out two more elected Presidents, Balraj Madhok in 1973 and L. K. Advani in 2005, at the bidding of the RSS. Rakesh Sinha, Delhi University sociologist sympathetic to the RSS, stated that M. C. Sharma interpreted the organisation and ideology according to his political convenience and nursed "ambitions of disengaging the party from the RSS." According to him, "those who believe that RSS or Hindutva is a stumbling block to the growth of the BJP have misconceived the RSS worldview." Journalist Kingshuk Nag remarked that it was the end of the legacy of Shyama Prasad Mookerjee in Jana Sangh, after which the RSS took full control.
