= St. Xavier's High School, Surat =

St. Xavier's Up-High School, Surat
- Ghod Dod Road, Athwa, Surat; Gujarat 395001, India

Information
- Type: Jesuit, Catholic
- Motto: ज्ञानं ज्ञानवतामहम्
- Established: 1963
- School board: GSEB
- Grades: 1-12
- Language: English; Gujarati
- Houses: Sardar (yellow); Subhash (red); Tagore (green); Tilak (blue)
- Colour
- Song: Xavier's Anthem

St Xavier's Up-High School is a Co-education institution. English–Gujarati medium school, grades one through twelve, opened in 1963 and run by the Society of Jesus. in Surat, Gujarat, India.

== History ==
The school was established in Nanpura in 1963. The first principal was Fr. Valentine, S.J. Later, the school moved to its current location on Ghod Dod Road, with another building which houses an auditorium and also has a lift for Standard 9th to 12th.

== Ethos ==
The school concentrates on the all round development of a student. For this, students are given ample opportunities in sports as well as scholastic activities. The students are expected to expand their talent horizons. The school's patron is St. Francis Xavier.

== Academic Curriculum ==
The school follows GSEB curriculum which is the state board of The Government of Gujarat. It has classes from kindergarten to class 10 in both English and Gujarati medium. It uses continuous and comprehensive evaluation. It also has classes 11 and 12 in both science and commerce streams, the latter only in English medium. The school was judged the best school in Surat district.

The school has four houses named for former Indian national leaders: Sardar; Subhash; Tagore; and Tilak. All student except the kindergarten students are a part of any one of the above houses.

== Student Council ==
The school maintains an active student council headed by the Head Boy who is assisted by assistant head boy. In each class, there are four captains belonging to each house which lead their respective houses in sports events. The RSP(s) are supposed to maintain discipline in class. Like the captains, there are four RSP(s) in each house.

== Facilities ==
The school has a physics laboratory, chemistry laboratory, biology laboratory, computer laboratories and an English Language Lab and Extramarks SmartClass. The school has a well-stocked library and two large halls. The school has a very large campus complete with a large playground. It has a cricket ground with pitches, a football ground, basketball courts and a tennis court. Other sports include table tennis and skating. The school grounds have three pavilions namely Fr. Joachim More S.J. pavilion, Fr. Ornellas Coutinho S.J. pavilion and Fr. Ovelil S.J. pavilion.

== School Activities ==
Annual Day: The annual day is the highlight of the school year. Many cultural programs such as dances, skits, singing are performed by students from all classes.

Sports Day: The sports day is generally held in December. It is a gala event consisting of many sports competitions. There is a march past performed by the members of the student council. Students compete on behalf of their houses. There is intense competition between the houses. The feats of house members in the events are awarded points. The school with the most points wins the house cup.

Voyage: It is an inter-school event in which schools from within the city as well as abroad participate. The competitions include General Knowledge quiz, spelling quiz, musical band competition, poster making competition, classical dance competition, debate and elocution. The winning school is awarded the Voyage Trophy.

Summer Coaching Camp: It is held during the summer vacation. The students, irrespective of their schools are coached for sports like Cricket, Football, Tennis, Karate, Table tennis, Skating and Basketball.

Teacher's Day: It is held on 5 September. There is a cultural program and the senior students are made teachers for a day.

Leadership Day: The new student council takes charge on this day. It is held at the beginning of the school year.

== Golden Jubilee Celebration ==
The 2012–13 academic year was celebrated as the golden jubilee year as the school had completed 50 years of establishment. Many cultural events were held. Every student was given a souvenir highlighting the school's journey. Dr. A.P.J Abdul Kalam, the 11th President of India, was invited to deliver the Golden Jubilee Commemorative Speech. A huge event took place at the indoor stadium where Dr. A.P.J Abdul Kalam was invited.

== Notable alumni ==
- Freddy Daruwala
- Ankur Vikal

== See also ==
- List of Jesuit sites
