= Prem Nath Dogra =

Indian politician

President of the Bharatiya Jana Sangh
- In office 1955–1956
- Preceded by: Mauli Chandra Sharma
- Succeeded by: Debaprasad Ghosh

Prem Nath Dogra (24 October 1884 – 21 March 1972) was a politician from Jammu and Kashmir who worked against the autonomous status granted to the state in Article 370 of the Indian constitution. In 1947, he was instrumental in forming the Jammu Praja Parishad party along with Balraj Madhok, which served as a local political arm of the Rashtriya Swayamsevak Sangh (RSS), a right-wing Hindutva paramilitary organisation. Dogra was later elected as the president of Bharatiya Jana Sangh in 1955 for a brief period.

== Early life ==
Prem Nath Dogra was born on October 24, 1884, in Smailpur, Jammu, as the only child of Pandit Anant Ram, in a Dogra Brahmin family. Dogra spent his early life in Lahore for his academics. He graduated with a BA in 1908.

== Jammu Praja Parishad ==
As president of the Jammu and Kashmir Praja Parishad in 1949, Dogra was arrested along with hundreds of members of the party for demanding for the abolition of the flag of Jammu and Kashmir, and the adoption of the Indian flag in the region. He was arrested again on 26 November 1952, during a demonstration against the hoisting of both the state and the national flag in Jammu. The arrest, alongside further developments, led to the Praja Parishad agitation spreading to other parts of Jammu and Kashmir.

== See also ==
- Ikkjutt Jammu
- Jammu and Kashmir Workers Party
- Bharatiya Janata Party
- Syama Prasad Mukherjee
- Girdhari Lal Dogra
