= Organiser (magazine) =

Hindutva Magazine

- Managing editor: Arun Kumar Goyal
- Current editor: Prafulla Ketkar
- Former editors: A. R. Nair; K. R. Malkani; L. K. Advani; V. P. Bhatia; Seshadri Chari
- Categories: News, Politics, Science, Sport, History
- Frequency: Weekly
- Circulation: 50,000
- Publisher: Bharat Prakashan Delhi Limited
- First issue: 1947; 79 years ago
- Country: India
- Based in: 2322, Sanskriti Bhavan, Laxmi Narain Street, Paharganj, New Delhi
- Language: English
- Website: organiser.org

Organiser is a mouthpiece of the Rashtriya Swayamsevak Sangh (RSS), a right-wing Hindutva paramilitary organisation. It was launched as a newspaper in 1947 in the weeks before the Partition of India. The newspaper has been edited by A. R. Nair, K. R. Malkani, L. K. Advani, V. P. Bhatia, Seshadri Chari, among others. It has promoted disinformation on many occasions.

== History ==
After the Second World War, the leadership of the Rashtriya Swayamsevak Sangh (RSS) contemplated how to communicate its views quickly to the growing membership of the organisation. Its theoretical underpinnings established by the founder K. B. Hedgewar discouraged publicity and mass communication. He preferred informal communication of verbal messages carried by RSS pracharaks (full-time workers). However, in the run-up to Indian independence, the "activist pracharaks"–those that favoured more wide-ranging activities for the RSS than societal organisation—argued that the RSS needed to publicise its position on the Partition, on the goals of independent India and on how Hindus should respond to communal tension. After discussion, the RSS leaders consented to the establishment of trusts that could publish newspapers and journals sympathetic to the RSS. Consequently, in late 1946, the swayamsevaks (volunteer members) in the Punjab and Delhi region sold shares for the Bharat Prakashan Trust and raised Rs. 400,000.

The Bharat Prakashan Trust started publishing the Organiser as a weekly starting on 3 July 1947, roughly a month after the British announcement to grant independence and partition the country. The initial issues of Organiser focused on the impending partition of India and called for resistance to such proposals.

The 1948 ban of the RSS following the assassination of Mahatma Gandhi and the press attacks on the RSS strengthened the `activist' members calling for a network of newspapers. In subsequent years, further newspapers were started in vernacular languages, including Panchjanya and Rashtra Shakti, and a news wire service Hindusthan Samachar.

'Activist' members of the RSS worked for the Organiser and other newspapers of the RSS. They were also the most regular contributors to the Organiser, writing on a wide range of social and policy issues where the RSS had a point of view.

- In 1949, it argued for political participation by the RSS.
- In 1952, Organiser opposed Federalism and separate provincial governments. It also opposed the linguistic reorganisation of the states.
- It opposed the Hindu Code Bill.
- It announced the formation of the Sangh Parivar organisations such as the Vishva Hindu Parishad and the Akhil Bharatiya Vidyarthi Parishad, and explained their rationale. It also printed regular news reports regarding their activities.
- In 1954, it supported the RSS faction in the Bharatiya Jana Sangh and denounced the president Mauli Chandra Sharma.
- In 1980, it denounced the Janata Party leadership over the dual membership issue and warned it that it would lose support both inside and outside the party.
- In 1983, it took the Bharatiya Janata Party to task for its alleged failure to attract "mass support," while it was able to attract non-Hindus.
- In 1990, it denounced the Mandal Commission recommendation of reservations.
- In 1998, it contemplated the form of the national government, whether it should be parliamentary, presidential, or some other form.
- It denounced multinationals, the World Bank loans and the economic liberalisation.
- It campaigned against the NCERT textbooks that went against Hindu nationalist views.
- In 1997, it covered the reconversion of tribal Christians.
- It consistently paints the Dalit leader B. R. Ambedkar as a Hindu nationalist, an anti-Muslim and an opponent of the Congress party.
- It expresses outrage about the perceived injustices to Hindus.

== Current status ==
In February 2013, media reports indicated that the RSS had dismissed the editors of the Organiser as well as Panchjanya for having taken a pro-Narendra Modi stand ahead of the RSS's endorsement of him as the Prime Ministerial candidate, and while they extended no support for the BJP President Nitin Gadkari. Vijay Kumar, the Managing Director of Bharat Prakashan took temporary charge as the editor of Organiser. In July, Prafull Ketkar, a political scientist from the BRD Arts and Commerce College for Women in Nashik, was appointed as the editor.

Multiple controversial articles have since appeared in the magazine, most notorious of which being an article calling Kerala a "Godless country." The article invited widespread condemnation including a censure by the Press Council of India. The publication of an interview of the RSS chief Mohan Bhagwat in the run-up to the Bihar polls is said to have embarrassed the BJP government and contributed to the defeat of the party in the polls. In January 2016, the RSS has appointed Jagadish Upasane, a former journalist with India Today and a director in the Bharat Prakashan Trust, as a "group editor" with full control over the editorial content of both Organiser and Panchjanya.

== Disinformation ==
The Organiser has promoted disinformation on many occasions. Sify found Organiser to have spread misleading information about Kerala state in 2015. In 2020, Janta Ka Reporter found Organiser to have spread fake news with the claim that a hungry minor girl was lured and raped in Tamil Nadu.

== See also ==
- Panchjanya (magazine)
- Fake news in India
- Hindutva
