= Calcutta South East Lok Sabha constituency =

Former Constituency of the Indian parliament in West Bengal

Coordinates: 22°34′22″N 88°21′50″E

Calcutta South East
- Former Lok Sabha constituency

Constituency details
- Country: India
- Region: East India
- State: West Bengal
- Established: 1951
- Abolished: 1957
- Total electors: 381,486
- Reservation: None

Calcutta South East was a constituency of the Lok Sabha (Lower House of the Parliament of India), located in the city of Calcutta, West Bengal. It was used in the parliamentary election of 1951–1952 as well as in a 1953 by-election. The constituency elected a single member of the Lok Sabha. As of 1952, the constituency had 381,486 eligible voters.

== Political dynamics ==
At the time, south-east Calcutta was viewed as the political nerve-centre of Calcutta, a city known for its vivid political life. Calcutta South-East had a predominantly middle class character. Whilst most of the assembly segments of Calcutta South East elected Indian National Congress legislators in the 1952 West Bengal Legislative Assembly election, the constituency was politically diverse. With a Bharatiya Jan Sangh MP, there was also a significant communist presence (at least two communist legislators elected from the area). The area of the constituency belonged to the areas that had elected Sarat Chandra Bose (Netaji Subash Chandra Bose's brother) against a Congress candidate.

== 1952 election ==
In the first elections after the independence of India, four candidates were in the fray in Calcutta South East: Mriganka Mohan Sur of the Indian National Congress, Dr. Syama Prasad Mukherjee of the Bharatiya Jan Sangh, Sadhan Gupta of the Communist Party of India and Satya Ranjan Bakshi of the Forward Bloc-National Synthesis. The result for the Calcutta South East seat was announced on 3 February 1952. Mukherjee won the seat with 65,026 votes (44.97%), Sur got 44,044 (30.46%), Gupta 32,168 (22.24%) and Bakshi 3,376 (2.33%).

== 1953 by-election ==
Mukherjee, a right-wing nationalist hardliner on the Kashmir conflict, had been detained in June 1953 whilst trying to enter Kashmir. Whilst detained he suffered a heart attack and died. A by-election was called in fill the vacancy created by Mukherjee's death. Due to the dramatic circumstances of Mukherjee's death and the complexity of the Calcutta politics (whilst the constituency was seen as a Congress stronghold it had also elected a Bharatiya Jan Sangh MP as well as communist members of the West Bengal Legislative Assembly) the by-poll caught attention in national politics.

The by-election was won by Gupta (CPI) with 58,211 votes (58.21%), Radhabinod Pal finished in second place with 36,319 votes (36.31%), J.P. Mitter (BJS) 5,431 (5.43%) and Bhupal Bose of the Forward Bloc (Marxist Group) got 5,415 votes (5.41%).

The constituency was abolished ahead of the 1957 parliamentary election. Sadhan Gupta contested and won the new Calcutta East constituency.
