= Syama Prasad Mookerjee: Life and Times =

- Author: Tathagata Roy
- Subject: Biography of Shyama Prasad Mukherjee
- Publisher: Popular Prakashan (2012), Penguin Random House
- Pages: 488
- ISBN: 9789377305178

Syama Prasad Mookerjee: Life and Times is a 2012 biographical book on Shyama Prasad Mukherjee, written by Tathagata Roy and originally published by Popular Prakashan. It was republished by Penguin Random House in 2018.

== About ==
The book is about the life and times of Shyama Prasad Mukherjee, an Indian politician, a Hindu Mahasabha leader, and the Bhartiya Jan Sangh founder. The author Tathagata Roy is a former educationist and politician belonging to the Bharatiya Janata Party as well as a former governor of Tripura. The book was originally published by Popular Prakashan in 2012 but it did not gain traction. It was republished by Penguin Random House again in 2018. This biography covers his life, ideas, along with contribution to India's political journey.

== Reception ==
A Hindustan Times review mentioned that the book has "a chronology of Mookerjee’s life." It also added that the book highlights Mukherjee's role in the 1943 Bengal Famine and his deep love for Bengal. However, it criticised the book for attacks on Nehru and the Congress, and it attributes to "Roy’s mind and not that of Mookerjee." Also, "the biographer’s own prejudices and political inclinations" come as the biggest problem in understanding Mookerjee's mind.

Indian economist Bibek Debroy wrote in his review for the Open that Roy's book is a "good book" on Shyama Prasad Mukherjee. Abhimanyu Kumar, writing for The Deccan Chronicle, noted that Roy "he holds no prisoners" and the book "is a hagiography couched as history."
