= Priyankar =

Priyankar is both a given name and a surname. Notable people with the name include:

- Atulya Priyankar (born 1986), Indian cricketer
- Priyankar Mukherjee (born 1985), Indian cricketer
- Priyankar Upadhaya (fl. 1992), Indian activist
