= Shaskiya Laghu Udyog Vikas Mahamandal =

Union Government company in India

- Type: Union Government Company
- Industry: Skill development, Paramedical education
- Founded: March 28, 2018; 8 years ago
- Headquarters: Nagpur, Maharashtra, India
- Key people: Yuvraj Fulji Ahire (CEO)
- Parent: Ministry of MSME, Government of India
- Website: www.gsidc.org.in

Shaskiya Laghu Udyog Vikas Mahamandal (GSIDC) is a Union Government Company under the Ministry of Micro, Small and Medium Enterprises, Government of India. Incorporated on 28 March 2018, it is headquartered in Nagpur, Maharashtra, and operates in the fields of skill development, paramedical education, and entrepreneurship training.

== History ==
The company was incorporated on 28 March 2018 under the Companies Act, 2013 and classified as a Union Government Company. It was established to support national objectives in skill development and the growth of micro, small and medium enterprises (MSMEs). GSIDC was registered with the Registrar of Companies, Mumbai, and secured its Trade Mark registration in 2017.

== Government participation ==
- Deen Dayal Upadhyaya Grameen Kaushalya Yojana (DDU-GKY)
- Pradhan Mantri Kaushal Vikas Yojana (PMKVY)
- Prime Minister's Employment Generation Programme (PMEGP)
- One District One Product (ODOP)
- National Apprenticeship Promotion Scheme (NAPS)

As part of the Atmanirbhar Bharat initiative, the organization has set a target to train 600,000 youth by 2029 and affiliate with 10,000 institutes nationwide.

== See also ==
- Skill India
- Atmanirbhar Bharat
- National Apprenticeship Promotion Scheme
