= K. R. Malkani =

Indian journalist, historian, and politician

Kewalram Ratanmal Malkani

Lieutenant-Governor of Puducherry
- In office 31 July 2002 – 27 October 2003
- Preceded by: Rajani Rai
- Succeeded by: P. S. Ramamohan Rao

Personal details
- Born: November 19, 1921; Hyderabad, Bombay Presidency, British India (now in Sindh, Pakistan)
- Died: October 27, 2003 (aged 81); Puducherry, India
- Political party: Bharatiya Janata Party

Kewalram Ratanmal Malkani (19 November 1921 – 27 October 2003) was a journalist, historian and politician associated with the Bharatiya Janata Party. He was the Vice-President of the Bharatiya Janata Party from 1991 to 1994. He was Member of Parliament, Rajya Sabha from 1994 to 2000 and served as Lieutenant Governor of Puducherry from July 2002 till his death in October 2003. He is the only person to have been chief editor of both Organiser and Panchjanya.

== Life ==
Born in Hyderabad, Sindh, (now in Pakistan), he received his education at D.G. National College, Hyderabad, Fergusson College, Pune, School of Economics and Sociology, Mumbai. He was Nieman Fellow at Harvard University, USA from 1961 to 1962.

Malkani is believed to be the first person to be arrested in the country, in the emergency, just two hours after it was declared at midnight on 25 June 1975. He was among the last to be released, after election results were declared in March 1977.

Malkani was associated with the Bharatiya Jana Sangh since its formation and was one of the founders of the Bharatiya Janata Party in 1980. He was Vice-President of the Deendayal Research Institute, New Delhi from 1983 to 1990. He was a member of the Rajya Sabha from 1994 to 2000. He served as editor of many newspapers and was General Secretary of the Editors Guild of India from 1978 to 1979. He has written several articles and books including "The Midnight Knock" (1977), "The R.S.S. Story" (1980), and "The Sindh Story" (1984), his most popular book on history. His book India First (2002) is a compilation of several of his articles over the years. His last book, Political Mysteries, explores several major Indian political assassinations including that of Mahatma Gandhi, Syama Prasad Mookerjee, Indira Gandhi and Rajiv Gandhi, the "Kashmir Princess", "Kanishka aircraft" bombing and the Purulia arms dropping case. The book is a result of his nearly ten years of research. He died on 27 October 2003. Malkani was an author and a journalist, the only person to have been chief editor of both Organiser and Panchjanya.

He was the youngest brother of freedom fighter N. R. Malkani. He is survived by two sons Arvind and Vikram and a daughter, Sindhu.

| Preceded by Dr. Rajani Rai | List of lieutenant governors of Puducherry; 31 July 2002–27 October 2003 | Succeeded by P.S.Ram Mohan Rao (Additional Charge) |
