= Avasarala Rama Rao =

Indian politician

President of the Bharatiya Jana Sangh
- In office 1961–1962
- Preceded by: Pitambar Das
- Succeeded by: Debaprasad Ghosh

Personal details
- Party: Bharatiya Jana Sangh

Avasarala Rama Rao was an Indian politician. From 1961 to 1962, he served as the president of the Bharatiya Jana Sangh, the political arm of the Rashtriya Swayamsevak Sangh (RSS), a far-right Hindutva paramilitary organisation. He was a member of the Andhra Pradesh Legislative Council. He died in 1976.
