= Balraj Madhok =

Indian politician (1920 - 2016)

President of Bharatiya Jana Sangh
- In office 1966–1967
- Preceded by: Bachhraj Vyas
- Succeeded by: Deendayal Upadhyaya

Personal details
- Born: 25 February 1920 Skardu, Jammu and Kashmir State, British Raj (now in Gilgit-Baltistan, Pakistan)
- Died: 2 May 2016 (aged 96) Delhi, India
- Party: Bharatiya Jana Sangh
- Education: Dayanand Anglo-Vedic College, Lahore
- Occupation: Politician
- Profession: Lecturer in history

Balraj Madhok (25 February 1920 – 2 May 2016) was an Indian politician from Jammu. Originally a member of the Rashtriya Swayamsevak Sangh (RSS), a right-wing Hindutva paramilitary organisation, he later worked as a politician in the Bharatiya Jana Sangh (often simply known as the Jan Sangh), the political arm of the RSS.

Madhok was instrumental in launching the RSS in the princely state of Jammu and Kashmir, and later the political party Jammu Praja Parishad for advocating against the autonomous status of the state. He eventually rose to become the president of the Jan Sangh and led its successful contest in the general election of 1967. He was later expelled from the Jan Sangh for "anti-party" activities following the death of Deendayal Upadhyaya.

== Early life ==
Madhok came from a Jammu-based Khatri family with Arya Samaj leanings. His father Jagannath Madhok was from Jalhan in the Gujranwala district of West Punjab, and worked as an official in the Government of Jammu and Kashmir in the Ladakh division. Balraj Madhok was born in Skardu, Baltistan and spent early childhood at Jallen. He studied in Srinagar, the Prince of Wales College in Jammu and the Dayanand Anglo-Vedic College (DAV College) in Lahore, graduating with B. A. Honours in History in 1940.

== Personal life ==
He married Kamla, who was a professor at the Delhi University. He had two daughters.

He died at the age of 96 on 2 May 2016 after a period of prolonged illness. He had been admitted to the All India Institute of Medical Sciences in New Delhi for a month. His death was condoled by many including the prime minister of India Narendra Modi and Lal Krishna Advani. Prime Minister Modi visited Madhok's residence to pay his last respects.

== Jammu and Kashmir ==
While studying in Jammu, Madhok joined the Rashtriya Swayamsevak Sangh (RSS) in 1938, which he found to be close to the Arya Samaj way of thinking. He became a pracharak (full-time worker) for the RSS in 1942 and was appointed as a worker for Jammu. He is said to have worked in this position for about eight months building up the RSS network. He then moved to Srinagar in 1944 as a lecturer in history at the DAV College and continued to work as an RSS organiser. He established the RSS network in the Kashmir Valley. When the Hindu refugees started arriving in Srinagar after the Partition, they also joined the RSS branches. Mehr Chand Mahajan, the Prime Minister of Jammu & Kashmir from 15 October 1947, was the chairman of the managing society of the DAV College. The RSS also provided aid for the Hindu and Sikh refugees arriving from Mirpur, Bhimber, Muzaffarabad and other towns, cities and villages that were coming under Pakistani control in western Jammu and Kashmir.

After the state joined India and Sheikh Abdullah was appointed as the Head of Emergency Administration in the Kashmir Valley, Madhok moved back to Jammu. He worked to form the Praja Parishad party, founded in November 1947, in collaboration with Hari Wazir. Prem Nath Dogra also joined later. The party demanded the complete unification of Jammu and Kashmir with India, in opposition to the loose autonomy negotiated between Abdullah and Nehru (later embodied in the Article 370). Madhok was extended from Jammu and Kashmir by Sheikh Abdullah as a result of his political stance.

Madhok moved to Delhi in 1948 and started teaching at the Panjab University College, which was established for the education of refugees from West Punjab. Later, he was a lecturer of history at the DAV College in Delhi affiliated to the Delhi University.

In 1951, Madhok launched the student union of the Sangh Parivar, viz., the Akhil Bharatiya Vidyarthi Parishad.

== Bharatiya Jana Sangh ==
In 1951, Madhok joined Shyama Prasad Mookerjee in the formation of what later become the political party of the Sangh Parivar, the Bharatiya Jana Sangh. The Bengal branch of the Jana Sangh was established by Mookerjee on 23 April 1951 and the Panjab and Delhi branch was established by Madhok a month later, on 27 May 1951. Madhok served as the secretary of the Panjab branch and later, a member of the Working Committee of the national organisation. He was part of the RSS-dominated Working Committee of the Jana Sangh in 1954, which ensured the ouster of the traditional politician wing led by the president M. C. Sharma. The Delhi branch of the party was dissolved and then reconstituted with RSS pracharaks at the helm. Madhok continued to be active in the Delhi branch of Jana Sangh, and won the Lok Sabha seat for Delhi in 1961.

In 1966–67, Madhok rose to become the President of the Jana Sangh. He led the party in the general election of 1967, when the party won 35 seats in the Lok Sabha, its highest tally. Madhok tried to create a coalition of rightist forces along with the Swatantra Party. He saw the split in the Congress party in 1969 as an opportunity to expand the role of Jana Sangh. However, the strategy was opposed by A. B. Vajpayee, who represented the hardline RSS faction inside the party. Madhok denounced what he called the party's `leftist' leanings and the influence of the RSS on its functioning. His stand led to his marginalisation in the party. In 1971, he suggested that the unexpected victory of Indira Gandhi was due to chemical ballot papers. In 1973, L. K. Advani, who became the president, expelled Madhok from the party for three years.

Madhok was arrested during the Emergency and was imprisoned for 18 months, (1975–1977). He joined the Janata Party, into which Jana Sangh merged, but resigned in 1979 and tried to revive Jana Sangh under the name Akhil Bharatiya Jana Sangh. However, the party was not successful.

In an interview with the Hindustan Times in 2010 on the occasion of his 90th birthday, he claimed that his then opponent Indira Gandhi had offered him the post of a central Minister in 1980 on her return to power.

== Later career ==
Right from his expulsion in 1973, Madhok remained a pungent critic of Bharatiya Janata Party leaders Atal Bihari Vajpayee, Lal Krishna Advani and their policies. During his last years, he resided in the New Rajinder Nagar area of New Delhi. The road where his house is located stands named as Jagannath Madhok Lane.

== Works ==
Madhok has authored over thirty books. A good number of them were on the Kashmir conflict:

- Kashmir Problem: A Story of Bungling (Bharti Sahitya Sadan, 1952)
- Kashmir: Centre of New Alignments (Deepak Prakashan, 1963)
- Kashmir: The Storm Center of The World (A. Ghosh, Texas, 1992)
- A Story of Bungling in Kashmir (Young Asia Publications, 1972)
- Jammu, Kashmir and Ladakh: Problem & Solution (Reliance Publishing House, 1987)
- Kargil and Indo-Pak Relations

some on Hindu nationalism:

- Indian Nationalism (Bharati Sahitya Sadan, 1969)
- Indianisation? What, Why and How (S. Chand, 1970)

and others on general political affairs:

- Hindustan on the Cross Roads (Mehta Brothers, Lahore, 1946)
- Political Trends in India (S. Chand, 1959)
- Portrait of a Martyr: Biography of Shyama Prasad Mukerjee
- India's Foreign Policy & National Affairs (Bharatiya Sahitya Sadan, 1969)
- Murder of Democracy (S. Chand, 1973)
- Reflections of a Detenu (Newman Group, 1978)
- Stormy Decade: Indian Politics, 1970–1980 (Indian Book Gallery, 1980)
- Punjab problem, the Muslim connection (Hindu World Publications, 1985)

He also wrote in Hindi:

- Jeet Ya Haar (in Hindi)
- Jindgi Ka Safar parts 1, 2 and 3 (in Hindi)

Christophe Jaffrelot has included extracts from Indianisation? What, Why and How in his Hindu Nationalism - A Reader.
