= Deen Dayal Upadhyaya Hospital, Shimla =

Deen Dayal Upadhyaya Hospital

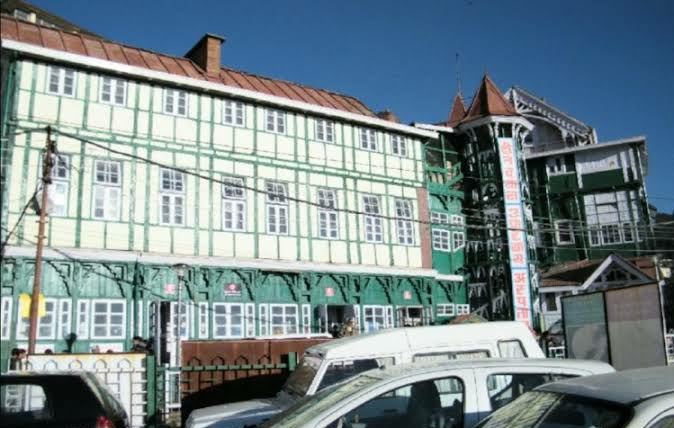
- Deen Dayal Upadhyaya Hospital old building

Geography
- Location: Shimla, Himachal Pradesh, India
- Coordinates: 31.104°N 77.171°E

Organisation
- Type: Zonal hospital

Services
- Beds: 300

History
- Former name: Ripon Hospital
- Constructed: 1882
- Opened: 14 May 1885

Deen Dayal Upadhyaya Hospital (DDU) formerly known as Ripon Hospital is a Zonal hospital in Shimla city. It is located in the city center above Old Bus Stand and below Lower Bazaar. Its one entrance is from Ram Bazaar another is from Ganj and downside entrance is near Old Bus Stand. The hospital provides healthcare facilities to the city residents. Latest health and medical facilities can be availed in the hospital.

== Etymology ==
The hospital is named after the renowned Indian politician Deendayal Upadhyaya. Its former name Ripon Hospital was named after Indian Viceroy Lord Ripon.

== History ==
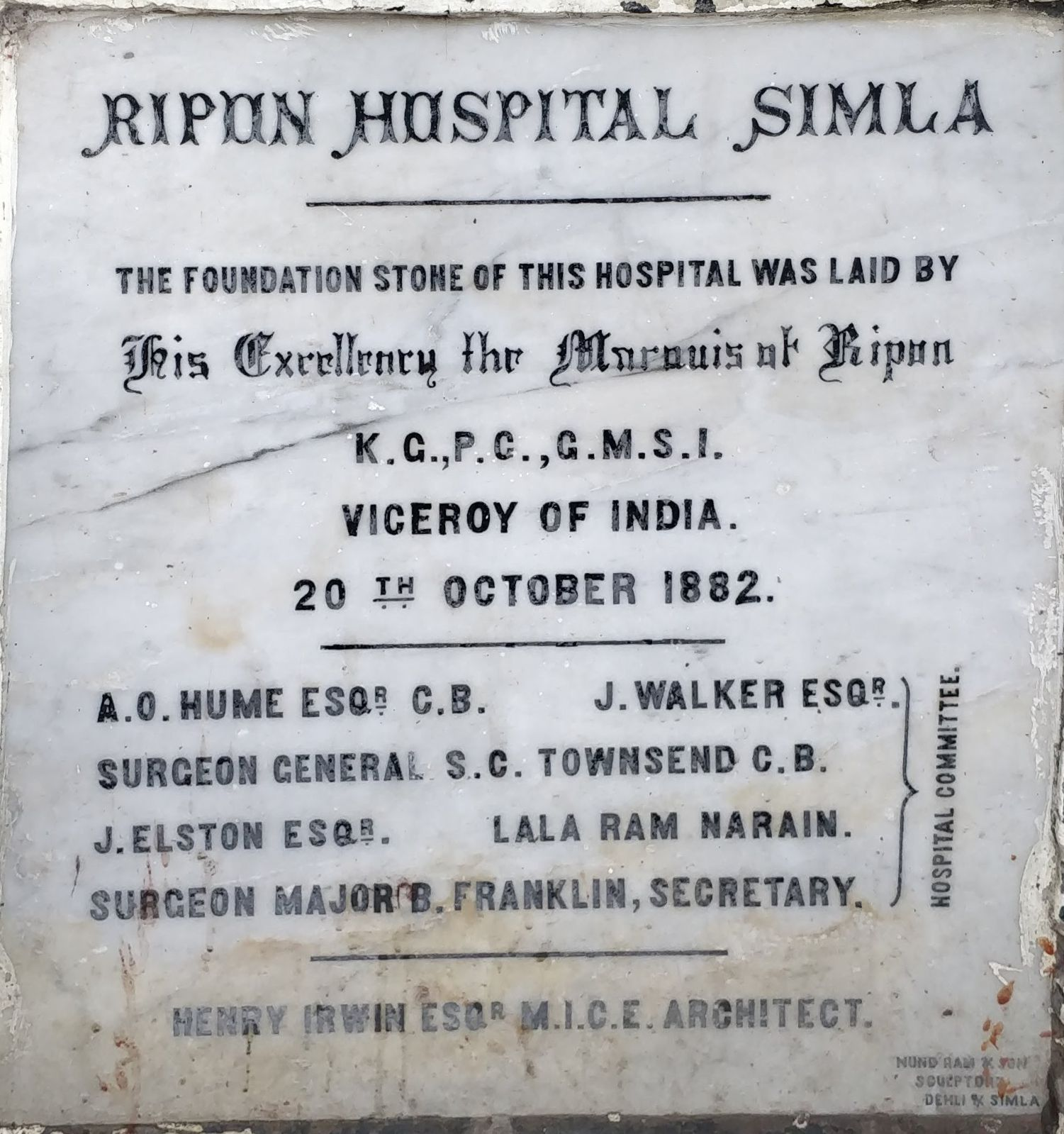
Foundation stone of Ripon Hospital Simla

The hospital was proposed by Lord Ripon, former viceroy of India and its construction began in 1882. It was opened on 14 May 1885 by Lord Duffrin. The hospital building was designed by Henry Irvin and it is one of the historical landmarks in Shimla.

== New Hospital Complex ==
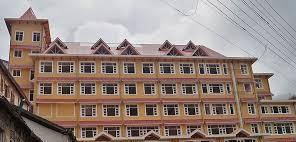
DDU New Hospital Complex

The new Deen Dayal Hospital Complex get completed on 26 April 2017. It was inaugurated by the then Chief minister Virbhadra Singh. The new complex is constructed with an outlay of 35 Crores and can accommodate 135 beds. The new seven storied complex have central heating and offer all amenities including chemist shops, parking, blood banks besides MRI, CT Scan facilities etc.

== Controversy ==
The hospital has selected to make a dedicated COVID-19 hospital, but the residents opposed it and a plea was admitted in Himachal Pradesh High Court against the state government. But the plea was rejected on 19 May 2020.

A woman from upper part of district Shimla got admitted in the hospital due to COVID-19 on 23 September 2020. After few days of her admission in the hospital, she committed suicide in the hospital by hanging herself. The relatives alleged the hospital staff for her suicide as the hospital staff did not provide her treat her instead they gave her some medicines each day and come to see her just twice or thrice a day, that.s how she got into depression and committed suicide, but the hospital staff deny all the allegations. The incident attracted a lot of protests in the city and because of this incident the hospital come into controversy another time in the same year.
