= Pitamber Das =

Indian politician

President of the Bharatiya Jana Sangh
- In office 1960-1961
- Preceded by: Debaprasad Ghosh
- Succeeded by: Avasarala Rama Rao

Member of Parliament, Rajya Sabha
- In office 1968–1974
- Constituency: Uttar Pradesh

Personal details
- Born: 30 January 1905
- Died: 23 July 1985 (aged 80)
- Party: Bharatiya Jana Sangh

Pitamber Das (30 January 1905 – 23 July 1985) was an Indian politician. From 1960 to 1961, Das served as the president of the Bharatiya Jana Sangh, the political arm of the Rashtriya Swayamsevak Sangh (RSS), a far-right Hindutva paramilitary organisation. He was a Member of Parliament, representing Uttar Pradesh in the Rajya Sabha the upper house of India's Parliament as a member of the Bharatiya Jana Sangh.
