= N. R. Malkani =

Indian social worker and freedom fighter

Narayandas Malkani (1890–1974) was a noted social worker and freedom fighter from Sindh state in undivided India. He was an academic by profession. He was the eldest brother of K R Malkani. They hailed from Hyderabad, Sindh. He was conferred the Padma Bhushan award in 1973 by the Government of India. He was a member of Rajya Sabha for two terms.

Malkani left teaching, joined Mahatma Gandhi and became his close confidant. He later took up constructive work in Sindh. He helped influence Allah Bux in favor of Congress and introduced Congress to Pir Pagaro of the Hurs.
