= Santi Sudha Ghosh =

Indian revolutionary (1893–1966)

- Born: 1893; Barisal, Bengal, British India
- Died: 1966 (aged 72–73); Kolkata, West Bengal, India
- Education: University of Calcutta
- Occupation: Educationist
- Known for: Indian freedom movement

Santi Sudha Ghosh (1893–1966) was an Indian freedom fighter from esrtswhile Bengal Presidency.

== Early life and education ==
Ghosh was born into a Bengali Hindu Kayastha family in Barisal, which was part of a place called undivided Bengal. She is the sister of Debaprasad Ghosh.

== Career ==
She was an educationist and taught at various colleges across Bengal; Victoria Institution, Calcutta, Mohammad Mohasin College, Hooghly, and Brojomohun College, Barisal. However, she remained active as a revolutionary collaborator.

In 1934, arrested in Calcutta, interned in Barishal, released in 1937 due to health concerns. Imprisoned again in 1942–43, she later focused on famine relief work and started working as a headmaster at Jagadish Saraswat Girls' High School until 1947.

== Publications ==
- Gololkdhandha (1938).
