= Bachhraj Vyas =

Indian politician

President of Bharatiya Jana Sangh
- In office 1965–1966
- Preceded by: Debaprasad Ghosh
- Succeeded by: Balraj Madhok

Member of the Maharashtra Legislative Council
- In office 1958–1962

Personal details
- Born: 1916
- Died: March 1972 (aged 55–56)
- Party: Bharatiya Jana Sangh

Bachhraj Vyas (1916 – March 1972) was an Indian politician. He was the President of the Bharatiya Jana Sangh in 1965. He was a member of the Maharashtra Legislative Council from 1958 to 1962.
