= Panchjanya (magazine) =

Magazine

- Editor: Hitesh Shankar
- Managing Editor: Arun Kumar Goyal
- Former editors: Atal Bihari Vajpayee; K.R. Malkani
- Categories: News, Politics, Science, Sport, History
- Frequency: Weekly
- Publisher: Bharat Prakashan (Delhi) Limited
- First issue: 1947; 79 years ago
- Country: India
- Based in: 2322, Sanskriti Bhavan, Laxmi Narain Street, Paharganj, New Delhi
- Language: Hindi
- Website: www.panchjanya.com

Panchjanya is an Indian weekly magazine published by Rashtriya Swayamsevak Sangh (RSS) in Hindi. It was launched by RSS pracharak Deendayal Upadhyaya in 1948 in Lucknow. RSS is a right-wing, Hindu nationalist, paramilitary volunteer organisation that is widely regarded as the parent organisation of the ruling party of India, the Bharatiya Janata Party.

== History ==
The weekly was launched on 14 January 1948, the day of Makara Sankranthi. Its first editor was Atal Bihari Vajpayee. The inaugural cover page carried a picture of Lord Krishna with its objective to pursue idealism based on patriotism and to uphold the cultural heritage of India.

Chief Editors have included K. R. Malkani.

It is now edited by Hitesh Shankar, who was formerly an editor of Hindustan. He is also the member of IIMC's new executive council.

In 1995, the Audit Bureau of Circulation credited the magazine with a circulation of 85,000 copies, a figure which Tarun Vijay claimed that it has crossed the 1 lakh.

== Controversy ==
Panchjanya in its 2015 October 25 edition carried a cover story Is Utpat ke Us paar (The other side of this disturbance) by Hindi writer Tufail Chaturvedi in which it justifies the Dadri incident, saying “the Vedas order that a sinner who slaughters a cow must be killed. For a lot of us, this is a question of life and death.”

In September 2021, it published a 4 page cover story criticising the glitches in GST Tax Portal developed by Infosys. The article questioned if any "anti-national power is trying to hurt India's economic interests through it". This article caused a lot of controversy in Indian politics and IT industry. Later, the communications chief of RSS clarified that "Panchajanya is not a mouthpiece of the RSS and the said article or opinions expressed in it should not be linked with the Sangh".

== See also ==
- Organiser (magazine)
