= Lokesh Chandra =

Indian historian (born 1927)

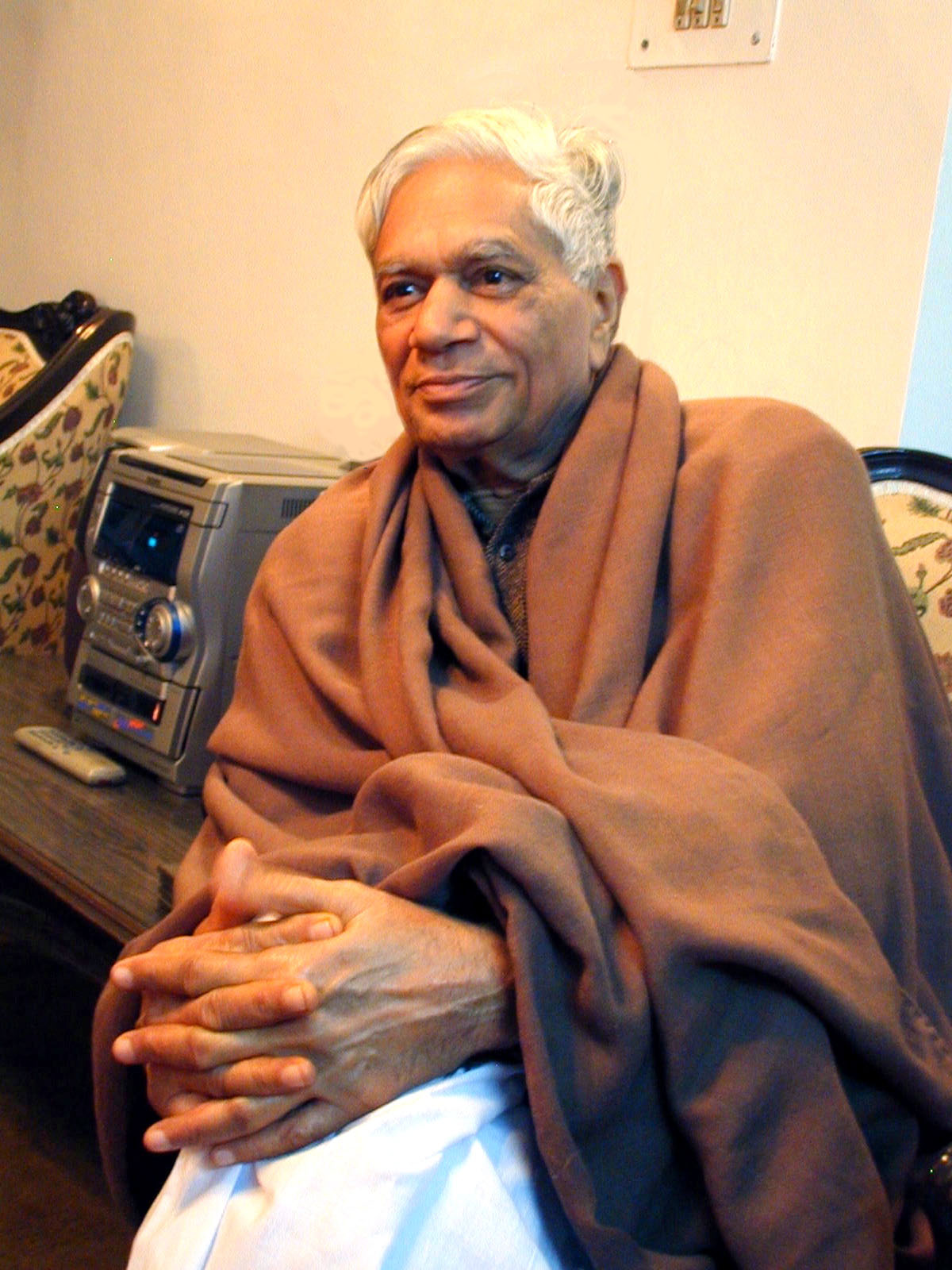
- Born: 11 April 1927 (age 99); Rawalpindi, Punjab, British India
- Education: M.A., 1947, Ph.D., 1950
- Occupation: Scholar
- Title: Ex-President, ICCR

Lokesh Chandra (born 11 April 1927 in Ambala, India) is a prominent scholar of the Vedic period, Buddhism and the Indian arts. Between 1942 and 2004, he published 576 books and 286 articles.

He has also held many official positions in the Indian government and was twice a member of Indian Parliament (during the period 1974–1980 and in 1980–1986).

== Biography ==
Lokesh Chandra was born on 11 April 1927 in Ambala, India. He is the son of the famous Sanskrit scholar, linguist and politician Raghu Vira. After obtaining a master's degree at the University of the Punjab in Lahore in 1947, he edited the Gavamayana portion of the Vedic work Jaiminiya Brahmana with the help of newly discovered manuscripts. Chandra went to the Netherlands to study Old Javanese with the Indologist Jan Gonda at Utrecht University, where he obtained a Ph.D. with the dissertation Jaiminiya Brahmana of the Samaveda II.1-80 in March 1950. Among them are classics like his Tibetan-Sanskrit Dictionary, Materials for a History of Tibetan Literature, Buddhist Iconography of Tibet, and his Dictionary of Buddhist Art in 15 volumes.

He is not only an eminent scholar, but has also held many official positions in the Indian government as a member of several committees: Education, Official Language, but also Tourism, Heavy Industry and many others, as his expertise was not limited to Buddhism and Indian Art, his favourite fields. He was also a member of the Indian Parliament twice (1974–1980) and (1980–1986).

In 2006 he was conferred with Padma Bhushan by the Indian Government.

He was the president of Indian Council for Cultural Relations during 2014–2017. He has also served as a member of the Indian Rajya Sabha, vice-president of the Indian Council for Cultural Relations, and Chairman of the Indian Council of Historical Research.

== Selected works ==
Between 1942 and 2004, Lokesh Chandra published numerous books (alone or as co-author) and articles, totalling 862 publications. While it is not possible to reproduce an exhaustive list, here are some of the most frequently cited.

=== Books ===
- Tibetan-Sanskrit Dictionary in 12+7 volumes, New Delhi, International Academy of Indian Culture and Aditya Prakashan, 1961, reprint in 1971, 1991, 1993 ISSN 0581-8532.
- Nīlakaṇṭha Lokeśvara as the Buddhist apotheosis of Hari-hara, New Delhi, International Academy of Indian Culture, 1979, 18p.
- The Thousand-armed Avalokiteśvara, Volume 1, New Delhi, Abhinav Publications, Indira Gandhi National Centre for the Arts, 1988, 303 p., ISBN 9788170172475.
- Dictionary of Buddhist Iconography. Śata-pitaka series: Indo-Asian literatures in 15 volumes, New Delhi, Published by International Academy of Indian Culture and Aditya Prakashan, 1999–2005, ISSN 0581-8532.
- India's Contributions to World Thought and Culture (Collective work edited by Lokesh Chandra), Madras, Publishers: Vivekananda Rock Memorial Committee, 1971, 838 p.
- Transcendental Art of Tibet, New Delhi, Published by International Academy of Indian Culture and Aditya Prakashan, 1996, 234 p. ISBN 9788186471890.
- Cultural Horizons of India: Studies in Tantra and Buddhism, art and archaeology, language and literature (Śata-pitaka series :Indo-Asian literatures in 7 volumes n° : 361, 366, 370, 381, 388, 390, 391), New Delhi, Published by International Academy of Indian Culture and Aditya Prakashan, 1990-1998, ISBN 8185179522 (ISBN of the 1st volume).
- Kāranda-vyūha-sūtra or The supernal virtues of Avalokiteśvara, New Delhi, International Academy of Indian Culture and Aditya Prakashan, 1999, 295 p, ISBN 9788186471890.
- With Raghu Vira, Gilgit Buddhist Manuscripts. Śata-pitaka series in 10 vol. Revised and Enlarged Compact Facsimile Edition. New Delhi: International Academy of Indian Culture, 1959–74, reprint in 1995 (3 volumes) by Sri Satguru Publishers, ISBN 9788170304449 and ISBN 9788170304456.
- With Sharada Rani, Mudras in Japan,. Volume 243 of Śata-pitaka series :Indo-Asian literatures, New Delhi, 1978 (Reprint :Vedams eBooks in 2001), 302 p. ISBN 9788179360002.

=== Articles ===
- Chandra, Lokesh (1985–1986). "The Origin of Avalokita-svara/Avalokite-śvara" (PDF). Indologica Taurinenaia. XIII: 187–202.
- Chandra, Lokesh (1979). "Origin of The Avalokiteśvara of Potala" (PDF). Kaylash: A Journal of Himalayan Studies: 21 pages.

== See also ==
- Nīlakaṇṭha Dhāraṇī, article in which several texts of Lokesh Chandra are presented and quoted.
