= Debaprasad Ghosh =

Indian politician (1894–1985)

President of the Bharatiya Jana Sangh
- In office 1956—1959
- Preceded by: Prem Nath Dogra
- Succeeded by: Pitamber Das
- In office 1962—1963
- Preceded by: Avasarala Rama Rao
- Succeeded by: Raghu Vira
- In office 1964—1965
- Preceded by: Raghu Vira
- Succeeded by: Bachhraj Vyas

Personal details
- Born: 15 March 1894 Gava, Barisal, Bengal, British India
- Died: 14 July 1985 (aged 91) Kolkata, West Bengal, India
- Spouse: Shobharani Ghosh (née Bose)
- Children: Six sons, two daughters
- Occupation: Professor

Acharya Debaprasad Ghosh (15 March 1894 – 14 July 1985) was an Indian mathematician and politician. He began his career as a professor of mathematics at the Ripon College. He was involved in politics as the President of Bharatiya Jana Sangh, the political wing of the Rashtriya Swayamsevak Sangh (RSS), a far-right Hindutva paramilitary organisation. He served as the party president from 1956 to 1965, except for the period between 1960 and 1962.

== Early life ==
Debaprasad was born in a Bengali Hindu Kayastha family on 15 March 1894 in the village of Gava, in the district of Backergunge, in eastern Bengal, now in Banaripara, Barisal District. His father Kshetranath Ghosh was professor of philosophy at the Brajamohan College in Barisal. His mother Annadasundari Devi was a poet.

Debaprasad ranked first in the Entrance Examination in 1908 from Brajamohan School in Barisal. In 1910, he again ranked first in the I.A. from Brajamohan College. In spite of that he was denied scholarship as both his school and college were connected with the Swadeshi Movement. In 1912, Debaprasad stood first in B.A.(Mathematics) from City College, Kolkata and obtained the Ishan scholarship. He completed an M.A. in Mathematics in 1914.

== See also ==
- Santi Sudha Ghosh
