= Raghu Vira =

Indian linguist, scholar and politician

President of the Bharatiya Jana Sangh
- In office 1963–1964
- Preceded by: Debaprasad Ghosh
- Succeeded by: Debaprasad Ghosh

Raghu Vira (30 December 1902 – 14 May 1963) was an Indian linguist, scholar, politician, and member of the Constituent Assembly. He was one of the editors of the critical edition of the Mahabharata which was compiled at the Bhandarkar Oriental Research Institute, Pune. More specifically he was the editor of the fourth Book of the critical edition of the Mahabharata i.e. the Virataparvan.

He was a Hindu nationalist and served as Jana Sangh's President. His son is the scholar Lokesh Chandra.

== Biography ==
Raghu Vira was born in Rawalpindi (West Punjab) on 30 December 1902. After gaining an MA from Punjab University, he received a Ph.D. from London and a D. Litt. from Leiden (Netherlands). He was in close touch with most of the Indologists of Europe during and after his three visits there. His early centre of work after his three study trips of Europe was Lahore where he became Head of the Sanskrit Department of the Sanatan Dharma College. At that time, his reputation as Head of the Department of Sanskrit of S.D. College was great. He was offered principalship of the college under the condition that he would not take part in politics. He turned down the offer.

He was elected first to the Constituent Assembly in 1948 and then to the Rajya Sabha in 1952 and 1957. He left the party in 1961 because of differences with Jawaharlal Nehru over the China policy. His contribution to parliamentary and inner party debates with inside knowledge of China and South-East Asia was unique. He pleaded for a large anti-China, anti-communist front with the Buddhist countries of South-East Asia. After his return from a three months cultural research tour of China in 1956, he told Nehru that China as a once 'cultural brother' of India was dead and that it was now an expansionist, materialist country. He had many skirmishes with Nehru in party meetings and ultimately resigned in December 1960 when the Chinese danger loomed large as the Government of India. Soon after his resignation he was invited to the Jana Sangh and joined it as the only major party close to his views, with a strong network of cadres.

== Raghu Vira's linguistic mission ==
Raghu Vira was a linguist and nationalist. He tried to organize Indian leaders against the imperialist monopoly of English. He had mastered many languages including Hindi, Sanskrit, Persian, Arabic, English, Urdu, Bengali, Marathi, Tamil, Telugu and Punjabi.

He coined some 1.50 lakh (150,000) scientific and parliamentary terms with Sanskrit as the common base just like Latin is for European languages. His Greater English-Hindi Dictionary remains his fundamental contribution to the cause of Indian languages. He was in touch with leading Tamil and Telugu scholars too for his research work.

Apart from his work of creating for Hindi, a scientific, technical and legal vocabulary based upon Sanskrit, his reputation as a scholar will rest mainly on many editions of ancient Sanskrit texts, either his own direct work or inspired by him.

=== Collection of manuscripts ===
Raghu Vira aimed to re-establish India as Jagat Guru by researching, excavating and collecting an estimated three lakh Sanskrit manuscripts spread worldwide as the relics of the glorious work of the Hindu and Buddhist missionaries as cultural colonisers of Mongolia, China, Central Asia, South-East Asia and Indonesia.

An account of his travel to Dunhuang is provided by his son, Lokesh Chandra: "My father, Professor Raghu Vira (1902–63), was a great friend and admirer of Aurel Stein from whom he had heard personal experience of his expeditions to Central Asia.1 The Dunhuang caves left a deep impression on my father’s mind. In 1955 he was invited to China for a study trip and stayed there from 23 April to 25 July. On 15 May, Premier Zhou Enlai received him and they discussed Dunhuang and the visit of the seventh-century Chinese monk Xuanzang en route to India. Their conversation is recorded in detail in my father’s account of his China trip. On 27 May, with 29 other members of the expedition, my father and his daughter Sudarshana Devi left for Dunhuang. The expedition included doctors, nurses, photographers, cooks, car mechanics, scholars from Peking University and The Academy of Sciences, archaeologists, and a female companion for Sudarshana. The Director of the Dunhuang Institute, Professor Chang, joined them on 28 May in Lanzhou. My father records the cold as unbearable, a jolting journey in a convoy plane and the bone-racking Polish car M20 crossing the vast desert. They arrived in Dunhuang on 30 May. The next day, my father visited a number of caves and the twenty-six stupas of the Five Dynasties. Inside one stupa were statues and an earthen lamp of Indian design. He then started visiting the caves, keeping a detailed record. "

As a result of his visits to these countries, huge number of relics and manuscripts were collected. These impressed leaders like Nehru, Zhou Enlai and Sukarno who extended personal encouragement, and appreciation to him for excavatory missions in search of Indian artifacts and manuscripts in those countries. When he came back from China after a three-month tour in 1956 he had a baggage of 300 wooden boxes with him containing rarest of finds, antiques and manuscripts bearing on the deep cultural contacts between China and India.

=== Saraswati Vihar ===
He established International Academy of Indian Culture (Saraswati Vihar). The Vihar was as Acharya Raghuvira's personal centre of research work in Indian culture, literature and religion with studies in its widespread impact and proliferation from Mongolia to Indonesia, China, Russia, and Central Asia. It was established first at Ichhra near Lahore in 1932 and sensing trouble in 1946 he shifted to Nagpur a year before Partition. The State Government of Pt. Ravi Shankar Shukla provided him all the facilities for the rehabilitation of his research network.

The Vihar was later shifted to Delhi in 1956 and is still functioning under the stewardship of his son Dr Lokesh Chandra. Prime Minister Jawaharlal Nehru, President Rajendra Prasad and ambassadors of nearly all South-East Asian countries used to visit it to see the progress of his work and his latest collections. Before embarking on his last fatal journey to Kanpur, he had divided his cultural mission among his son, daughter-in-law, two daughters and a son-in-law.

=== Nationalist politician ===
The Indian National Congress recognized Raghu Vira's linguistic expertise and elected him first to Constituent Assembly in 1948 and then to Rajya Sabha in 1952 and 1957.

In 1948 he clashed with Congress Party bosses on the question of Sheikh Abdullah's repressive policies against people of Jammu represented by Praja Parishad. Along with another Congress member, M.L. Chattopadhyay, he visited Jammu to see things for himself and issued a blistering report against Sheikh Abdullah's policies which later on turned into the Sheikh's azadi mongering Islamiat.

Even before RSS work began in Lahore, he started his Hindu Rakshak Sangh, and used to hold daily drills in DAV College grounds.

== Humanist ==
Apart from being a scholar, he was also a man of great energy and the highest ideas, that he sometimes put into practice by working among the untouchables in villages and spending some time in Gandhiji's Sabarmati Ashram. His interest in politics came from Lala Lajpat Rai's ideas. In Delhi, he found time from his studies to work for improving the living conditions of people living in slums.

== Death ==
He died in a car accident near Kanpur when, as Jana Sangh President, he was going to do election campaign for his socialist friend Ram Manohar Lohia's by-election in the Farrukhabad Lok Sabha constituency in UP in May 1963.

== Works ==
- The Consolidated Great English-Indian Dictionary of Technical Terms. International Academy of Indian Culture. 1950.
- A Comprehensive English-Hindi Dictionary of Governmental and Educational Words and Phrases. International Academy of Indian Culture. 1955.
