= Vasantrao Oak =

Vasantrao Oak (13 May 1914 – 9 August 2000) was one of the earliest pracharaks (transl. publicists) and leaders of Rashtriya Swayamsevak Sangh, Hindu Nationalist organisation in India.

In October 1946, Oak along with Dadarao Parmarth and Krishna Paranjape established first shakhas, daily meetups of RSS, in Guwahati, Dibrugarh and Shillong which were part of Assam Province. Oak had played an important role in establishing Bharatiya Jana Sangh along with Syama Prasad Mukherjee.

He contested the 1957 Lok Sabha election from Chandni Chowk constituency as a Jan Sangh candidate and lost to Radha Raman of Indian National Congress.
