= Deen Dayal Antyoday Upchar Yojna =

Deen Dayal Antyoday Upchar Yojna is a government of Madhya Pradesh scheme to provide free health care to poor families. The scheme was launched in September 2004. Under the scheme medical checkups and treatment worth up to rupees 20000 was covered for a financial year.
