= Extramarks =

Online tutoring platform

Extramarks Education
- Type: Private
- Industry: Edutech
- Founded: 2007; 19 years ago
- Founder: Atul Kulshrestha
- Headquarters: Noida, India
- Area served: Middle East, North Africa, South East Asia, Europe, USA, Australia
- Key people: Atul Kulshrestha (MD & Chairman); Ritvik Kulshrestha (CEO); Poonam Singh Jamwal (CBO)
- Revenue: ₹284 crore (US$29 million) (2025)
- Number of employees: 1000+ (2026)
- Website: www.extramarks.com

Extramarks Education is an Indian education technology company that develops digital learning solutions for schools and students. It was founded in 2007 by Atul Kulshrestha and is headquartered in Noida, India. The company provides technology-based educational content and platforms used by schools for classroom teaching and learning. Its services are primarily used in the school education segment.

The company operates in India and has expanded its presence to several international markets, including Asia, Africa, the Middle East, and the United States.

== History ==
Extramarks Education was founded in 2007 as an education technology company in India. It initially operated on a business-to-business (B2B) model, providing digital classroom solutions, including Smart Class products, to schools and educational institutions.

In November 2011, a 38.5% stake in the company was acquired by Infotel Broadband, owned by Mukesh Ambani, through its affiliate Reliance Strategic Investments, for an undisclosed amount.

In May 2017, the company expanded into test preparation services for entrance examinations, including the Joint Entrance Examination (Mains and Advanced), medical entrance examinations, and foundation-level courses for Classes VI–X. It also established classroom coaching centres in Jaipur, Bhopal, Indore, Lucknow, and Haldwani.

In 2018, the company expanded its operations into B2C segment with the launch of its mobile application, Extramarks-The Learning App.

== Products ==
In September 2015, Extramarks released Extramarks Smart Study, an Android application aligned with CBSE and ICSE curricula for students from pre-primary level to Class 12. Between 2018 and 2019, the company launched several additional products, including the IITJEE Test Prep App, Interactive Learning App, and Extramarks Achieve, a mentorship programme providing academic guidance and support to students.

In October 2019, Extramarks introduced an artificial intelligence-based chatbot, Alex, for responding to student queries. In November 2020, it launched Lil One, a learning application for children. In March 2022, the company launched The Teaching App, providing tools for online classes, assessments, content access, live instruction, and classroom management for educators and institutions.

== Operations ==
The company reports over 10 million learners using its platforms and states that more than 1 million teachers have been trained in the use of its digital education tools and teaching methodologies.

== Partnership ==
In October 2016, Extramarks partnered with the New Delhi Municipal Council to implement a smart education system in NDMC schools. In 2020, it collaborated with the Indraprastha Institute of Information Technology, Delhi (IIIT-Delhi) on artificial intelligence research and entered into a partnership with Mahindra Lifespaces. In February 2022, Extramarks announced a multi-year agreement with Arsenal Football Club to serve as its official learning partner in India, South Africa, and the Middle East.
