= Calcutta East Lok Sabha constituency =

Former Constituency of the Indian parliament in West Bengal

Coordinates: 22°34′22″N 88°21′50″E

Calcutta East
- Former Lok Sabha constituency

Constituency details
- Country: India
- Region: East India
- State: West Bengal
- Established: 1957
- Abolished: 1967
- Total electors: 497,202 (1957)
- Reservation: None

Calcutta East was a constituency of the Lok Sabha (Lower House of the Parliament of India), located in the city of Calcutta, West Bengal. It was used in the 1957 Indian general election and 1962 Indian general election. As of 1957, the constituency had 497,202 eligible voters. In 1962 it had 471,011 electors. In 1967 it was replaced by the Calcutta South constituency.

== Members of Parliament ==
- 1957: Sadhan Gupta (Communist Party of India)
- 1962: Ranendranath Sen (Communist Party of India)
