= Deendayal Upadhyaya =

Indian thinker and former leader of the political party Bharatiya Jana Sangh

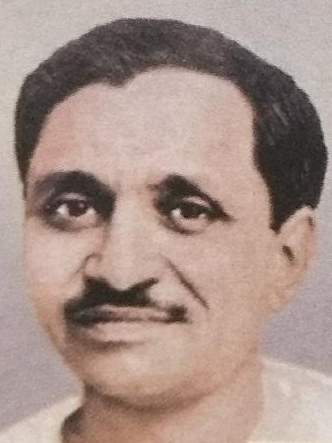
- Portrait from a joint postage stamp issued by India and South Africa, 2018

10th President of Bharatiya Jana Sangh
- In office December 1967 – February 1968
- Preceded by: Balraj Madhok
- Succeeded by: Atal Bihari Vajpayee

Personal details
- Born: 25 September 1916 Nagla Chandraban, Mathura, United Provinces, British India (present-day Deendayal Dham, Mathura, Uttar Pradesh, India)
- Died: 11 February 1968 (aged 51) Mughalsarai, Uttar Pradesh, India (present-day Pandit Deen Dayal Upadhyaya Nagar)
- Party: Bharatiya Jana Sangh
- Education: Sanatan Dharma College, Kanpur, Agra University (BA)
- Known for: Integral Humanism

Deendayal Upadhyaya (Note: Sometimes spelt as Deen Dayal Upadhyaya) (25 September 1916 – 11 February 1968), was an Indian politician, a proponent of integral humanism ideology and leader of the political party Bharatiya Jana Sangh (BJS), the forerunner of Bharatiya Janata Party (BJP). Upadhyaya started the monthly publication Rashtra Dharma, broadly meaning 'National Duties', in the 1940s to spread the ideals of Hindutva revival. Upadhyaya is known for drafting Jan Sangh's official political doctrine, Integral humanism, by including some cultural-nationalism values and his agreement with several Gandhian socialist principles such as sarvodaya (progress of all) and swadeshi (self-sufficiency).

== Early life ==
Upadhyaya was born in 1916 in the village of Nagla Chandraban, now called Deendayal Dham, in Mathura District, 30 km (19 mi) from Mathura, in a Brahmin family. His father, Bhagwati Prasad Upadhyaya, was an astrologer and his mother, Rampyari Upadhyaya, was a homemaker and observant Hindu. Both his parents died when he was eight years old and he was brought up by his maternal uncle. His education, under the guardianship of his maternal uncle and aunt, saw him attend high school in Sikar. The Maharaja of Sikar gave him a gold medal, Rs 250 to buy books and a monthly scholarship of Rs 10. and did his Intermediate in Pilani, Rajasthan, (Now Birla School, Pilani). He took a BA degree at the Sanatan Dharma College, Kanpur. In 1939 he moved over to Agra and joined St. John's College, Agra to pursue a master's degree in English literature but could not continue his studies. He did not take up his MA exams due to some family and financial issues. He became known as Panditji for appearing in the civil services examination, wearing the traditional Indian dhoti-kurta and cap.

== Career ==
Upadhyaya had come into contact with the RSS through a classmate, Baluji Mahashabde, while studying at Sanatan Dharma College in 1937. He met the founder of the RSS, K. B. Hedgewar, who engaged with him in an intellectual discussion at one of the shakhas. Sunder Singh Bhandari was also one of his classmates at Kanpur. He started full-time work in the RSS from 1942. He had attended the 40-day summer vacation RSS camp at Nagpur where he underwent training in Sangh Education. After completing second-years training in the RSS Education Wing, Upadhyaya became a lifelong pracharak of the RSS. He worked as the pracharak for the Lakhimpur district and, from 1955, as the joint Prant Pracharak (regional organiser) for Uttar Pradesh. He was regarded as an ideal swayamsevak of the RSS essentially because 'his discourse reflected the pure thought-current of the Sangh'.

Upadhyaya started the monthly Rashtra Dharma publication from Lucknow in the 1940s, using it to spread Hindutva ideology. Later he started the weekly Panchjanya and the daily Swadesh.

In 1951, when Syama Prasad Mookerjee founded the BJS, Deendayal was seconded to the party by the RSS, tasked with moulding it into a genuine member of the Sangh Parivar. He was appointed as General Secretary of its Uttar Pradesh branch, and later the all-India general secretary. For 15 years, he remained the outfit's general secretary. He also contested by-poll for the Lok Sabha seat of Jaunpur from Uttar Pradesh in 1963 bi election when Jansangh MP Bramh Jeet Singh died, but failed to attract significant political traction and did not get elected.

In the 1967 general elections, the Jana Sangh got 35 seats and became the 3rd largest party in the Lok Sabha. The Jan Sangh also went onto be a part of the Samyukta Vidhayak Dal, an experiment of having non-Congress opposition parties as a coalition to form governments in multiple states This brought the right and the left of the Indian political spectrum on one single platform. He became president of the Jana Sangh in December 1967 in the Calicut session of the party. His presidential speech in that session focused on multiple aspects right from the formation of coalition government to language. No major events happened in the party during his tenure as the president that ended in 2 months in February 1968 due to his death.

Upadhyaya edited Panchjanya (weekly) and Swadesh (daily) from Lucknow. In Hindi, he wrote a drama on Chandragupta Maurya, and later wrote a biography of Shankaracharya. He translated a Marathi biography of Hedgewar.

In December 1967, Upadhyaya was elected president of the BJS.

== Philosophy ==
Integral humanism was a set of concepts drafted by Upadhyaya as a political program and adopted in 1965 as the official doctrine of the Jan Sangh.

== Death ==
On 10 February 1968, Upadhyaya boarded a late-night train from Lucknow to Patna, which made several stops along the way. Upadhyaya was confirmed to have been seen alive at Jaunpur, shortly after midnight. The train briefly stopped at Varanasi around 01:40 am before proceeding on to Mughalsarai; on arrival at 2:10 am, Upadhyaya was not aboard. At approximately 2:20 am, his body was located outside the Mughalsarai Junction, nearly 750 feet from the platform. A five-rupee note was in his hand.

The Central Bureau of Investigation (CBI) investigation team determined that Upadhyaya had been pushed out of the coach by robbers just before the train entered Mughalsarai station. A passenger travelling in the cabin adjoining Upadhyaya's reported seeing a man removing files and bedding from it. This man was later identified as Bharat Lal. The CBI arrested Lal and his associate Ram Awadh and charged the pair with murder and theft. According to the CBI, the men stated that Upadhyaya had caught them attempting to steal his bag and threatened to call the police, so they pushed him from the train. The men were acquitted of the murder charges. Lal was convicted of the theft, but appealed to the Allahabad High Court.

The murder remains officially unresolved. Many people believed the murder to be politically motivated, and felt that the CBI had not handled the case correctly. Following the acquittals, over 70 MPs demanded a commission of inquiry. The Government of India appointed Justice Y. V. Chandrachud of Bombay High Court to lead a single-person inquiry into the facts of the case. His findings were published in 1970. According to Chandrachud, the CBI's investigation had produced an accurate picture of the death as a spontaneous incident resulting from an interrupted theft. He found no evidence of political motivation.

In 2017, Upadhyaya's niece and several politicians demanded a fresh probe in his murder.

== Legacy ==
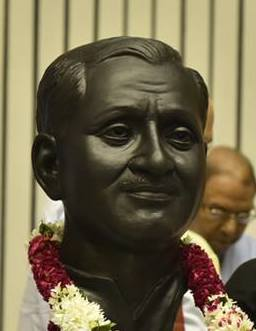
Bust of Deendayal Upadhyaya

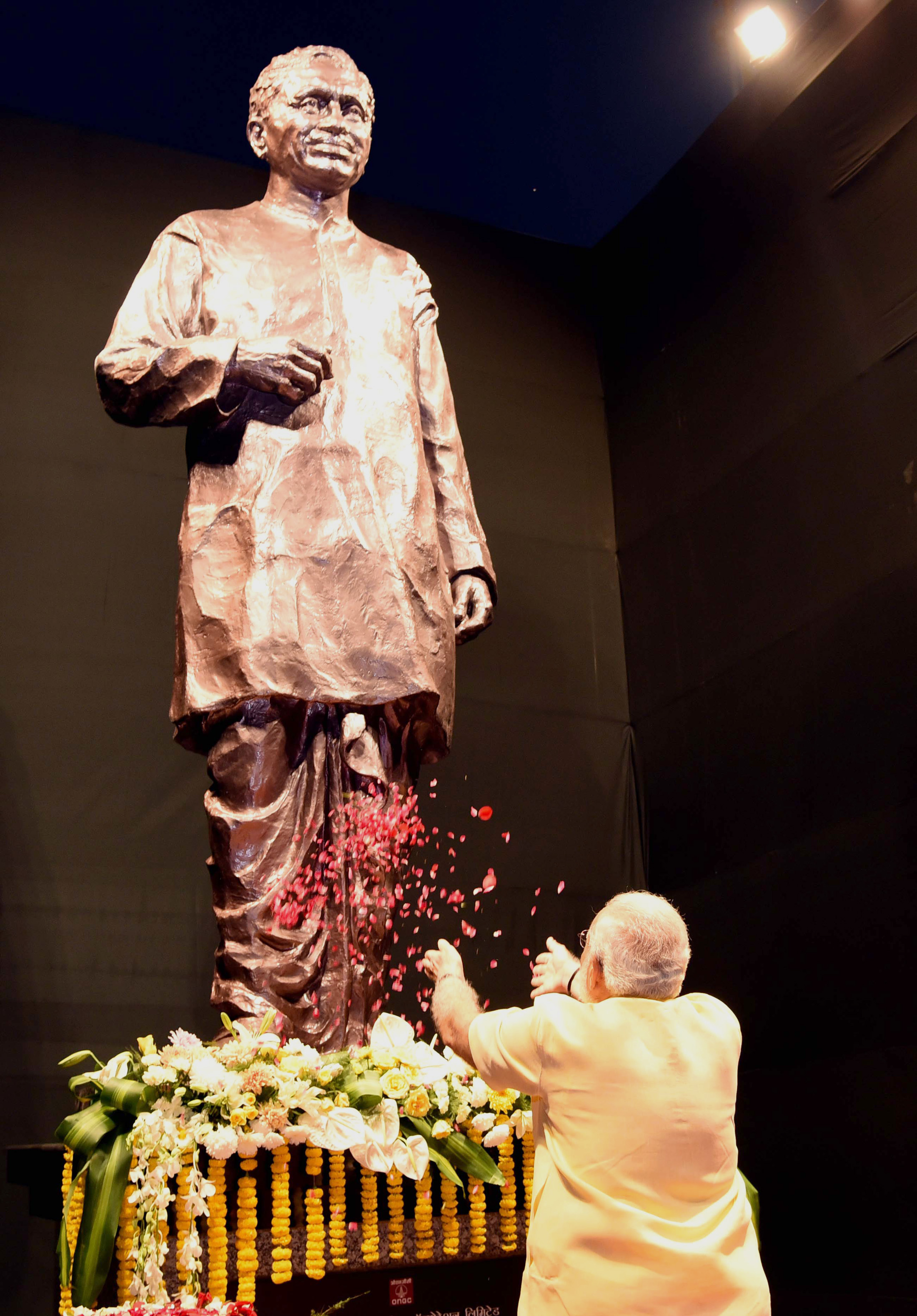
Statue of Deendayal Upadhyaya

Since 2016 the BJP government under Prime Minister Narendra Modi named several public institutions after him. In Delhi, a road/marg has been named after Upadhyaya. In August 2017, the BJP state government in UP proposed renaming of Mughalsarai station in honour of Upadhyaya as his dead body was found near it. Opposition parties protested this move in the Parliament of India. The Samajwadi Party protested with a statement that the station was being renamed after someone "who had made no contribution to the freedom struggle". The Deen Dayal Research Institute deals with queries on Upadhyaya and his works.

In 2018 a newly constructed cable-stayed bridge in Surat was named Pandit Dindayal Upadhyay Bridge in honour of him.

On 16 February 2020 in Varanasi, Narendra Modi opened the Pandit Deendayal Upadhyaya Memorial Centre and unveiled a 63-foot statue of Upadhyaya, his tallest statue in the country.

Commemorative Stamps issued in the memory of Deendayal Upadhyay
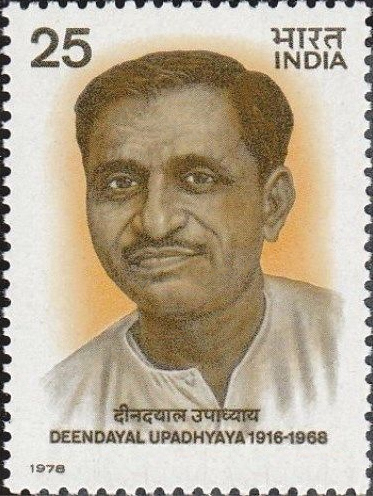
Stamp issued in 1978

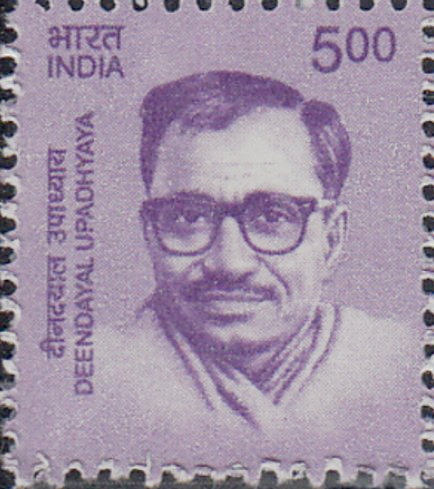
Stamp issued in 2015

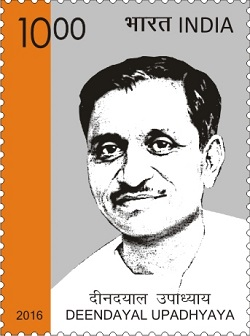
Stamp issued in 2016

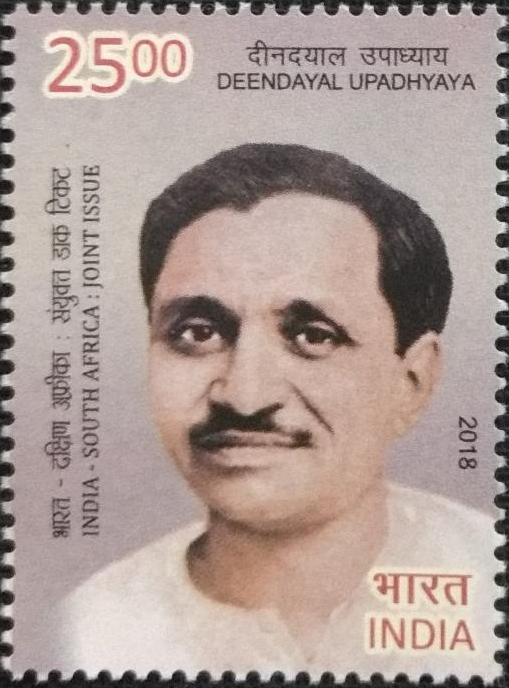
Stamp issued in 2018
Growth of Bharatiya Jana Sangh from 1952-1967
Footprint of Bharatiya Jana Sangh in 1952

Footprint of Bharatiya Jana Sangh in 1957

Footprint of Bharatiya Jana Sangh in 1962

Footprint of Bharatiya Jana Sangh in 1967

== See also ==
- Deen Dayal Upadhyaya Grameen Kaushalya Yojana
- Deen Dayal Upadhyaya Gram Jyoti Yojana
- Deen Dayal Antyoday Upchar Yojna
- Pandit Deendayal Upadhyay Indoor Stadium
- Pandit Deendayal Petroleum University
- Deendayal Upadhyaya Hospital, Shimla
- Pandit Deendayal Upadhyaya Institute of Archaeology
