= Sadhan Gupta =

Indian politician (1917–2015)

Sadhan Chandra Gupta (7 November 1917 – 19 September 2015) was an Indian lawyer and politician. Gupta became the first blind parliamentarian in independent India in 1953, and later served as Advocate General of West Bengal.

== Early life and education ==
Gupta was born in Dacca on 7 November 1917. His father, Jogesh Chandra Gupta, was a lawyer at the Calcutta High Court and a leader of the Indian National Congress. Sadhan Gupta became permanently blind after contracting smallpox during his childhood. Gupta went to school at the Calcutta Blind School. Later he studied at Presidency College (Economics, graduated with honours) and Calcutta University (Law). He became involved in radical politics during his student days, joining the Communist Party of India in 1939. He served as president of the Bengal Provincial Students Federation.

== Career ==
=== Legal career ===
Gupta enrolled as a lawyer at the Calcutta High Court in 1942. As a young lawyer, he took up many cases regarding persons under preventive detention. He attained nationwide fame when arguing in the 1945 habeas corpus case "Emperor vs Shibnath Banerjee", first in the Calcutta High Court and thereafter in the Federal Court of India. His actions in the "Emperor vs Shibnath Banerjee" case provoked praise from Mahatma Gandhi. In 1947 he joined the Bar at Middle Temple.

=== Parliamentarian ===
Gupta contested the Calcutta South East seat in the 1951–1952 election, challenging Dr. Syama Prasad Mukherjee. Gupta finished in third place with 32,168 votes (22.24%). Gupta was elected to the Lok Sabha (Lower House of the Parliament of India) from the Calcutta South East constituency in a 1953 by-election, held after Mukherjee died. Gupta received 58,211 votes (55.24%). He thus became the first blind parliamentarian in independent India. In the election he had defeated Radhabinod Pal, who was a senior lawyer.

In parliament, Gupta was noted for his flawless English. He would softly type braille whilst listening to the debates. Whilst being a parliamentarian Gupta continued to practice law. Apart from his work at the Calcutta High Court, Gupta appeared in court cases at Srinagar, Jaipur, Jodhpur, Patna, Allahabad, Cuttack, Jamshedpur, Jabalpur and even Chittagong (in East Pakistan).

Gupta was re-elected to the Lok Sabha in the 1957 general election, from the Calcutta East constituency as a Communist Party of India candidate. He obtained 143,350 votes (62.68%).

=== State legislator ===
When CPI was divided, Gupta sided with the Communist Party of India (Marxist). Gupta contested the Chowringhee constituency in the 1967 West Bengal Legislative Assembly election. Gupta finished in second place with 11,658 votes (31.62%), being defeated by Congress candidate Siddhartha Shankar Ray. He was elected to the West Bengal Legislative Assembly in the 1969 election from the Kalighat constituency. Gupta obtained 28,133 votes (55.18%)

=== Left Front period ===
When the Left Front came to power in West Bengal in 1977, Gupta played an important role in maneuvering the various legal challenges put against its land reform programs and Operation Barga. In 1979 he was named as Additional Advocate General of West Bengal.

In 1986 he was named Advocate General of West Bengal by the Left Front government, following the death of Snehangshu Kanta Acharya. He became the first visually impaired person to hold that office.

== Social work ==
Gupta founded the National Federation of the Blind and became the first president of the organization. He also became the first president of the Indian chapter of Disabled Peoples' International. He served as president of various trade unions, such as in the insurance and ITC sectors.

Apart from his legal and political career, Gupta was noted as a singer of ganasangeet, Rabindrasangeet and folk songs.

== Death ==
Gupta died on 19 September 2015.
