= Ghod Dod Road =

Goddod
- Neighbourhood
- Interactive map of Goddod
- Coordinates: 21°10′30″N 72°48′23″E
- Country: India
- State: Gujarat
- District: Surat

Government
  - Body: Surat Municipal Corporation

Languages
  - Official: Gujarati, Hindi
- Time zone: UTC+5:30 (IST)
- PIN: 395007
- Telephone code: 91261-XXX-XXXX
- Vehicle registration: GJ
- Lok Sabha constituency: Navsari
- Vidhan Sabha constituency: Majura
- Civic agency: Surat Municipal Corporation
- Website: gujaratindia.com

Ghod Dod Road is an area located in Surat, India. It stretches from Majura Gate to Parle Point. It has many shopping complexes and schools. It is one of the main posh roads of Surat. The road was remade in the 1980s, which turned the road into a major shopping hub of Surat. The road is most well known for its high quality lifestyle.

Many major malls, restaurants and shopping centres of Surat like Sarela Shopping Centre, Jolly Arcade, Rangila Park, Regent Mall, G3, Chocolate Mall are located on this road. The best ladies boutiques are situated here which are well known in Surat and nearby towns like RAMA'S Haute Couture, Tambour, Tamrind, Aquarians etc. are located here.

== Name ==
Ghod dod means horse racing in Gujarati, thus Ghod Dod Road can be translated into English as "Horse Racing Road". The name originated in the 1900s, when horse racing events took place on the road.

== See also ==
- List of tourist attractions in Surat
