= Priyankar Upadhaya =

Professor Priyankar Upadhaya holds the UNESCO Chair for Peace and Intercultural Understanding at Banaras Hindu University(Asia's largest residential university), Varanasi. Professor Upadhyaya heads the Malaviya Center for Peace Research situated in the University.

== Career ==
Professor Upadhayaya holds M.Phil. and Ph.D Degree of Jawaharlal Nehru University, Delhi. He also holds Advance International Diploma(s) in Conflict Resolution from the Uppsala University, Sweden. Prof. Upadhaya has done Post-Doctoral Research at University of London and the Woodrow Wilson Centre for International Scholars, Wash DC. He was selected for the Guest Scholar Award of the Woodrow Wilson Centre of International Scholars at Wash DC 1992, Faculty Research Award, Canadian Govt. 1999 and Senior Fulbright Award in 2004. Professor Upadhyaya has taught and done research in Political Science & Conflict Resolution in many parts of the world, including Concordia University, Montreal; Ulster University in Northern Ireland, at the Department of Political Science, Karlstad University in Sweden and United States Air Force Academy at Colorado Springs. He has also been Fellow at the Henry L Stimson Center, Wash DC, and recently a Senior Visiting Fellow at the Peace Research Institute Oslo.

Professor Upadhyaya has publications in journals and books from OUP, MUP, CUP, Sage, Ashgate and Routledge among others and research articles in reputed International Journals such as the Denver Journal of International Law & Policy; International Studies (Sage) and Strategic Analysis (Routledge).

Prof. Upadhyaya has taught International Relations & Peace Studies at Banaras Hindu University for over three decades. He has contributed as a Resource Person for UN University of Peace and at the Henry L Stimson Center, Wash DC. Prof Upadhyaya also a visiting speaker at the Foreign Service Institute, Naval War Academy and National Defense College in India. More recently Prof Upadhyaya has served as the ICCR Chair of Indian Studies at Dublin City University. He has served in various quality committees constituted by Government of India including the Civil Service Examination Reform Committee under purview of the Civil Services Examination UPSC and the National Mission on Education through ICT [NMEICT]. He occasionally serves as a guest expert at various news channels as ABP News and BBC News.

In June 2016, Professor Upadhyaya delivered a path breaking speech at the UN Consultative meet on 'Peace as a process' held at Geneva. In September, 2016, Professor Upadhyaya was invited by President Barack Obama to a White House meeting on Religious and Interfaith dialogue as a representative of the Indian Education System. Earlier in 2017, Professor Upadhyaya has been appointed as the PRIO Global Fellow. On 24 May 2018, a book titled Long Walk of Peace: towards a culture of prevention authored by Professor Priyankar Upadhyaya and published by UNESCO, was launched at the UN Library at Geneva.
