= Shyama Prasad Mukherjee =

Indian politician, nationalist, barrister and academician (1901–1953)

Syama Prasad Mookerjee
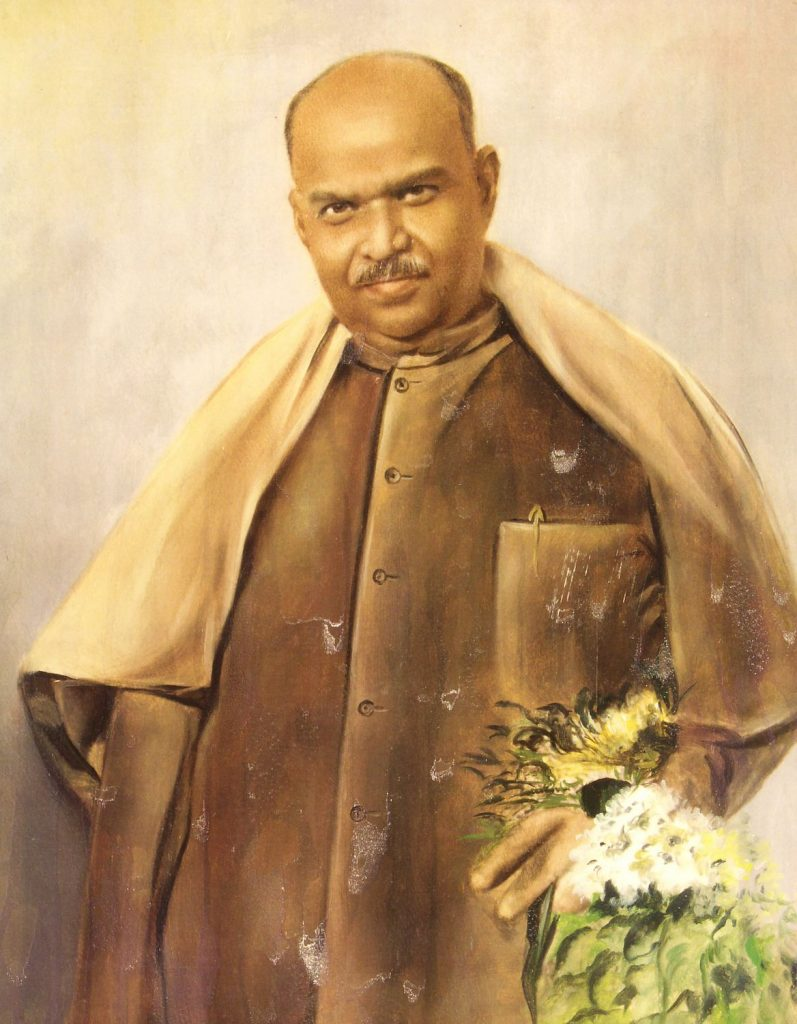

Member of Parliament, Lok Sabha
- In office 17 April 1952 – 23 June 1953
- Succeeded by: Sadhan Gupta
- Constituency: Calcutta South East, West Bengal

Union Minister of Industry
- In office 15 August 1947 – 6 April 1950
- Prime Minister: Jawaharlal Nehru
- Preceded by: Position established
- Succeeded by: Harekrushna Mahatab

Member of the Indian Constituent Assembly
- In office 9 December 1946 – 24 January 1950
- Constituency: West Bengal

Founder-President of the Bharatiya Jana Sangh
- In office 1951 – 1952
- Preceded by: Position established
- Succeeded by: Mauli Chandra Sharma

Finance Minister of Bengal Province
- In office 12 December 1941 – 20 November 1942
- Prime Minister: A. K. Fazlul Haq

Member of the Bengal Legislative Council
- In office 1929–1947
- Constituency: Calcutta University

Vice-Chancellor of Calcutta University
- In office 8 August 1934 – 8 August 1938
- Preceded by: Hassan Suhrawardy
- Succeeded by: Muhammad Azizul Haque

President of Akhil Bhartiya Hindu Mahasabha
- In office 1943–1947

Personal details
- Born: 6 July 1901 Calcutta, Bengal Presidency, British India (present-day Kolkata, West Bengal, India)
- Died: 23 June 1953 (aged 51) Srinagar, Jammu and Kashmir, India
- Party: Bharatiya Jana Sangh
- Other political affiliations: Indian National Congress (1929–1930); Hindu Mahasabha (till 1948)
- Spouse: Sudha Mookherji née Devi (m. 1922; died 1933)
- Children: 5
- Parent: Ashutosh Mukherjee (father)
- Relatives: Chittatosh Mookerjee (nephew)
- Education: Presidency College (BA, MA, LLB, D.Litt.); Lincoln's Inn
- Profession: Academician; barrister; politician; activist
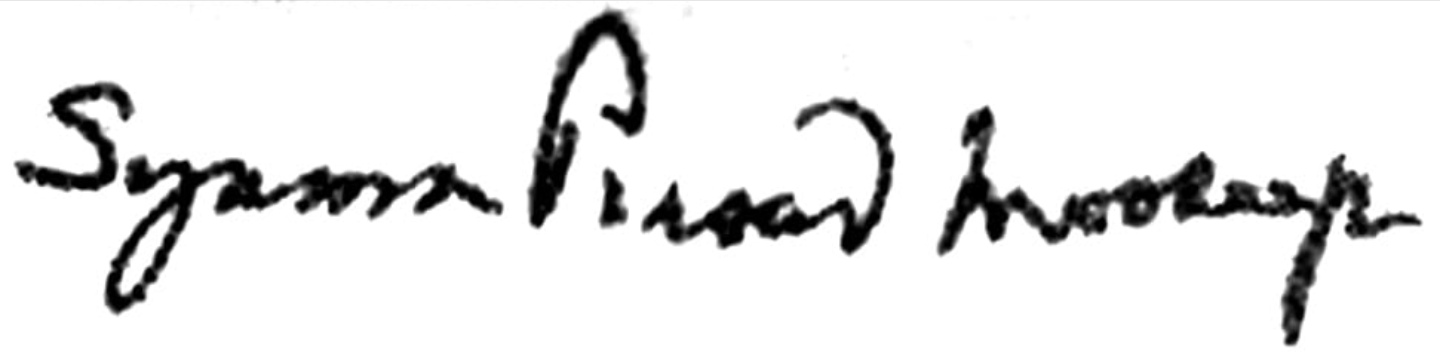
- Signature

Syama Prasad Mookerjee (6 July 1901 – 23 June 1953) was an Indian barrister, educationalist, politician, Hindutva activist, and a minister in the state and national governments, 1941–1942: Syama Prasad Mookerjee served as the Finance Minister in the cabinet of undivided Bengal. At that time, the Prime Minister of Bengal was A. K. Fazlul Huq appointed by Nehru even after opposing Congress. He later served as India's Minister for Industry and Supply (currently known as Minister of Commerce and Industries) in Prime Minister Jawaharlal Nehru's cabinet after breaking up with the Hindu Mahasabha. After falling out with Nehru, protesting against the Liaquat–Nehru Pact, Mukherjee resigned from Nehru's cabinet. With the help of the Rashtriya Swayamsevak Sangh, he founded the Bharatiya Jana Sangh in 1951.

He was also the president of Akhil Bharatiya Hindu Mahasabha from 1943 to 1946. He was arrested by the Jammu and Kashmir Police in 1953 when he tried to cross the border of the state. He was provisionally diagnosed with a heart attack and shifted to a hospital but died a day later. Since the Bharatiya Janata Party (BJP) is the successor to the Bharatiya Jana Sangh, Mukherjee is also regarded as the founder of the BJP by its members.

== Early life and academic career ==
Shyama Prasad Mukherjee was born during the British Raj on 6 July 1901 in Calcutta, now located in the West Bengal state of India. His grandfather Ganga Prasad Mukherjee was born in Jirat and was the first in the family who migrated to and settled in Calcutta.

His father was Ashutosh Mukherjee, a judge of the High Court of Calcutta, Bengal Presidency, and was also the Vice-Chancellor of the University of Calcutta. His mother was Jogamaya Devi Mukherjee. He was a very meritorious student and he came to Calcutta to study with the help of the wealthy people of Jirat. Later he settled down in the Bhawanipore area of Calcutta.

Mukherjee enrolled in Bhawanipur's Mitra Institution in 1906 and his behaviour in school was later described favourably by his teachers. In 1914, he passed his matriculation examination and was admitted into Presidency College. He stood seventeenth in the Inter Arts Examination in 1916 and graduated in English, securing the first position in first class in 1921. He was married to Sudha Devi on 16 April 1922. Mukherjee also completed an MA in Bengali, being graded as first class in 1923 and also became a fellow of the Senate of the University of Calcutta in 1923. He completed his LLB in 1924.

He enrolled as an advocate in Calcutta High Court in 1924, the same year in which his father had died. Subsequently, he left for England in 1926 to study at Lincoln's Inn and was called to the English Bar in the same year. In 1934, at the age of 33, he became the youngest Vice-Chancellor of the University of Calcutta; he held the office until 1938. During his term as Vice-Chancellor, Rabindranath Tagore delivered the University Convocation Address in Bengali for the first time, and the Indian vernacular was introduced as a subject for the highest examination. On 10 September 1938, the Senate of Calcutta University resolved to confer honorary D.Litt. on the Ex-Vice-Chancellor in its opinion "by reason of eminent position and attainments, a fit and proper person to receive such a degree." Mukherjee received the D.Litt from Calcutta University on 26 November 1938. He was also the 15th President of the Association of Indian Universities during 1941–42.

== Political career before independence ==
He started his political career in 1929 when he entered the Bengal Legislative Council as an Indian National Congress (INC) candidate representing Calcutta University. However, he resigned the next year when the INC decided to boycott the legislature. Subsequently, he contested the election as an independent candidate and was elected in the same year. In 1937, he was elected as an independent candidate in the elections which brought the Krishak Praja Party to power.

He served as the Finance Minister of Bengal Province in 1941–42 under A.K. Fazlul Haq's Progressive Coalition government which was formed on 12 December 1941 after the resignations of the Congress government. During his tenure, his statements against the government were censored and his movements were restricted. He was also prevented from visiting the Midnapore district in 1942 when severe floods caused a heavy loss of life and property. He resigned on 20 November 1942 accusing the British government of trying to hold on to India at any cost and criticised its repressive policies against the Quit India Movement. (Note: The Quit India Movement or the India August Movement, was a movement launched at the Bombay session of the All-India Congress Committee by Mahatma Gandhi on 8 August 1942, during World War II, demanding an end to British Rule of India.) After resigning, he mobilised to support and organised relief with the help of the Mahabodhi Society, Ramakrishna Mission and Marwari Relief Society. In 1946, he was again elected as an independent candidate from Calcutta University. He was elected as a member of the Constituent Assembly of India in the same year.

=== Hindu Mahasabha and Bengali Hindu Homeland Movement ===
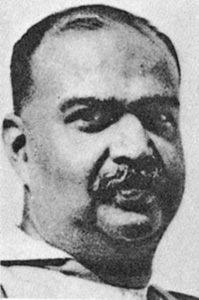

Mukherjee joined the Hindu Mahasabha in Bengal in 1939 and became its acting president that same year. He was appointed as the working president of the organisation in 1940. In February 1941, Mukherjee told a Hindu rally that if Muslims wanted to live in Pakistan, they should "pack their bag and baggage and leave India ... [to] wherever they like". Yet, the Hindu Mahasabha also formed provincial coalition governments with the All-India Muslim League in Sindh and the North-West Frontier Province while Mukherjee was its leader. He was elected as the President of Akhil Bharatiya Hindu Mahasabha in 1943. He remained in this position till 1946, with Laxman Bhopatkar becoming the new president in the same year.

Mukherjee demanded the partition of Bengal in 1946 to prevent the inclusion of its Hindu-majority areas in a Muslim-dominated East Pakistan. A meeting held by the Mahasabha on 15 April 1947 in Tarakeswar authorised him to take steps to ensure the partition of Bengal. In May 1947, he wrote a letter to Lord Mountbatten saying Bengal must be partitioned even if India was not. He also opposed a failed bid for a united but independent Bengal made in 1947 by Sarat Bose, the elder brother of Subhas Chandra Bose, Kiran Shankar Roy; Leader of the Congress Parliamentary Party in the Bengal Legislative Assembly; Satya Ranjan Bakshi; Huseyn Shaheed Suhrawardy, the Prime Minister of Bengal at that time and Abul Hashim. The United Bengal proposal was even supported by the Netaji's Forward Bloc and Communist Party of India. Mukherjee launched the Bengali Hindu Homeland Movement. It refers to the movement of the Bengali Hindu people for the Partition of Bengal in 1947 to create a homeland, aka West Bengal, for themselves within the Indian Union, in the wake of the Muslim League's proposal and campaign to include the entire province of Bengal within Pakistan, which was to be a homeland for the Muslims of British India. He misled Bengali Hindus by saying that a sovereign United Bengal would be a puppet state of Pakistan and Hindus would be suppressed as a minority, rather than Bose-Suhrawardy's utopia of a peaceful and economically prosperous Bengal.

=== Opposition to Quit India Movement ===
Following the Hindu Mahasabha's official decision to boycott the Quit India movement and the Rashtriya Swayamsevak Sangh's decision of non-participation in the movement.

Mukherjee wrote a letter to Sir John Herbert, Governor of Bengal as to how they should respond to "Quit India" movement. In this letter, dated 26 July 1942 he wrote:

Let me now refer to the situation that may be created in the province as a result of any widespread movement launched by the Congress. Anybody, who during the war, plans to stir up mass feeling, resulting in internal disturbances or insecurity, must be resisted by any Government that may function for the time being.

Mukherjee in this letter reiterated that the Fazlul Haq-led Bengal Government, along with its alliance partner Hindu Mahasabha would make every possible effort to defeat the Quit India Movement in the province of Bengal and made a concrete proposal in regard to this:

The question is how to combat this movement (Quit India) in Bengal? The administration of the province should be carried on in such a manner that despite the best efforts of the Congress, this movement will fail to take root in the province. It should be possible for us, especially responsible Ministers, to be able to tell the public that the freedom for which the Congress has started the movement, already belongs to the representatives of the people. In some spheres, it might be limited during an emergency. Indians have to trust the British, not for the sake of Britain, not for any advantage that the British might gain, but for the maintenance of the defense and freedom of the province itself. You, as Governor, will function as the constitutional head of the province and will be guided entirely on the advice of your Minister.

The Indian historian R.C. Majumdar noted this fact and stated:

Shyam Prasad ended the letter with a discussion of the mass movement organised by Congress. He expressed the apprehension that the movement would create internal disorder and endanger internal security during the war by exciting popular feeling and he opined that any government in power has to suppress it, but that according to him could not be done only by persecution... In that letter, he mentioned item-wise the steps to be taken for dealing with the situation...

During Mukherjee's resignation speech, however, he characterised the policies of the British government towards the movement as "repressive".

== Political career after independence ==
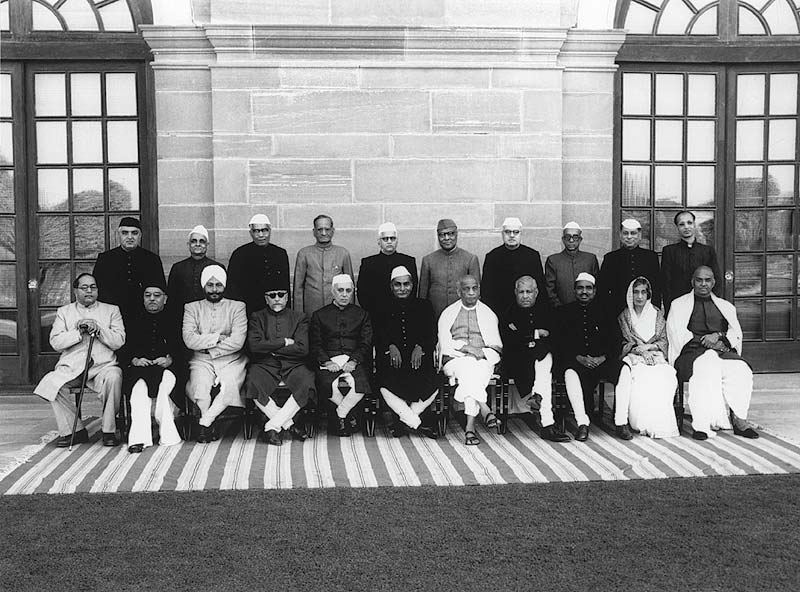
(L to R sitting) B. R. Ambedkar, Rafi Ahmed Kidwai, Sardar Baldev Singh, Maulana Abul Kalam Azad, Jawaharlal Nehru, Rajendra Prasad, Sardar Patel, John Mathai, Jagjivan Ram, Amrit Kaur and Shyama Prasad Mukherjee. (L to R standing) Khurshed Lal, R.R. Diwakar, Mohanlal Saksena, N. Gopalaswami Ayyangar, N.V. Gadgil, K. C. Neogy, Jairamdas Daulatram, K. Santhanam, Satya Narayan Sinha and B. V. Keskar.

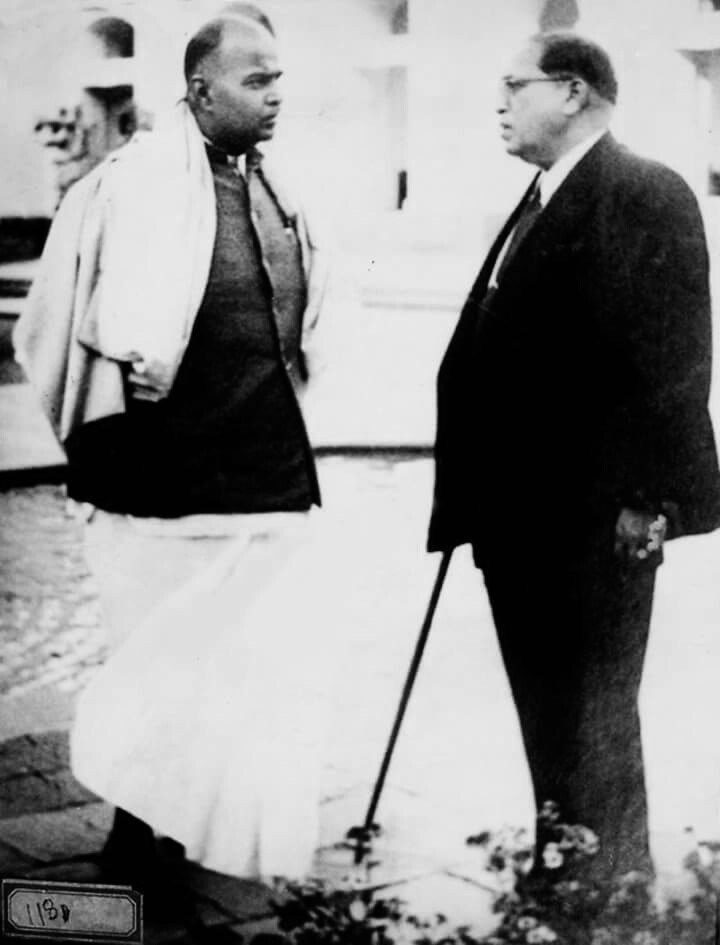
B. R. Ambedkar and Shyama Prasad Mukherjee talking on the Campus of Parliament, 1951

Prime Minister Jawaharlal Nehru inducted Mukherjee into the Interim Central Government as a Minister for Industry and Supply on 15 August 1947.

Mukherjee condemned the assassination of Mahatma Gandhi as the "most stunning blow that could fall on India. That he who had made India free and self-reliant, a friend of all and enemy of none, loved and respected by millions, should fall at the hands of an assassin, one of his community and countrymen, is a matter of the deepest shame and tragedy." He began to have differences with Hindu Mahasabha after Gandhi's killing, in which the Mahasabha was blamed by Vallabhbhai Patel for creating the atmosphere that led to the killing. Mukherjee suggested the organisation suspend its political activities. Shortly after it did, in December 1948, he left. One of his reasons was the rejection of his proposal to allow non-Hindus to become members. Mukherjee resigned along with K.C. Neogy from the Cabinet on 8 April 1950 over a disagreement about the 1950 Delhi Pact with Pakistani Prime Minister Liaquat Ali Khan.

Mukherjee was firmly against their joint pact to establish minority commissions and guarantee minority rights in both countries as he thought it left Hindus in East Bengal to the mercy of Pakistan. While addressing a rally in Calcutta on 21 May, he stated that an exchange of population and property at the governmental level on a regional basis between East Bengal and the states of Tripura, Assam, West Bengal and Bihar was the only option in the current situation.

Mukherjee founded the Bharatiya Jana Sangh on 21 October 1951 in Delhi, becoming its first president. In the 1952 elections, the Bharatiya Jana Sangh (BJS) won three seats in the Parliament of India, including Mukherjee's. He had formed the National Democratic Party within the Parliament. It consisted of 32 members of the Lok Sabha and 10 members of the Rajya Sabha; however, it was not recognised by the speaker as an opposition party. The BJS was created with the objective of nation-building and nationalising all non-Hindus by "inculcating Indian Culture" in them. The party was ideologically close to the RSS and widely considered the proponent of Hindu nationalism.

== Opinion on special status of Jammu and Kashmir ==
After having supported Article 370 during the parliamentary discussions over the legislation, Mukherjee became opposed to the legislation after falling out with Nehru. He fought against it inside and outside the parliament with one of the goals of Bharatiya Jana Sangh being its abrogation. He raised his voice against the provision in his Lok Sabha speech on 26 June 1952. He termed the arrangements under the article as the Balkanisation of India and the three-nation theory of Sheikh Abdullah. The state was granted its flag along with a prime minister whose permission was required for anyone to enter the state. In opposition to this, Mukherjee once said "Ek desh mein do Vidhan, do Pradhan aur Do Nishan nahi chalenge" (A single country can't have two constitutions, two prime ministers, and two national emblems). Bharatiya Jana Sangh along with Hindu Mahasabha and Jammu Praja Parishad launched a massive Satyagraha to get the provisions removed. In his letter to Nehru dated 3 February 1953, he wrote that the issue of accession of Jammu and Kashmir to India should not be delayed, to which Nehru responded by referring to international complications the issue could create.

Mukherjee went to visit Kashmir in 1953 and observed a hunger strike to protest the law that prohibited Indian citizens from settling within the state and mandating that they carry ID cards. Mukherjee wanted to go to Jammu and Kashmir but, because of the prevailing permit system, he was not given permission. He was arrested on 11 May at Lakhanpur while crossing the border into Kashmir illegally. Although the ID card rule was revoked owing to his efforts, he died as a detainee on 23 June 1953.

On 5 August 2019, when the Government of India proposed a constitutional Amendment to repeal Article 370, many BJP members described the event as realisation of Mukherjee's dream.

== Personal life ==
Mukherjee had three brothers who were; Rama Prasad who was born in 1896, Uma Prasad who was born in 1902 and Bama Prasad Mukherjee who was born in 1906. Rama Prasad became a judge in the High Court of Calcutta, while Uma became famed as a trekker and a travel writer. He also had three sisters; Kamala who was born in 1895, Amala who was born in 1905 and Ramala in 1908. He was married in 1922 to Sudha Devi for 11 years and had five children – the last one, a four-month-old son, died from diphtheria. His wife died of double pneumonia shortly afterward in 1933 or 1934. Mukherjee refused to remarry after her death. He had two sons, Anutosh and Debatosh, and two daughters, Sabita and Arati. His grandniece Kamala Sinha served as the Minister of State for External Affairs in the I. K. Gujral ministry.

Mukherjee was also affiliated with the Buddhist Mahabodhi Society. In 1942, he succeeded M.N. Mukherjee to become the president of the organisation. The relics of Gautam Buddha's two disciples Sariputra and Maudgalyayana, discovered in the Great Stupa at Sanchi by Sir Alexander Cunningham in 1851 and kept at the British Museum, were brought back to India by HMIS Tir. A ceremony attended by politicians and leaders of many foreign countries was held on the next day at Calcutta Maidan. They were handed over by Nehru to Mukherjee, who later took these relics to Cambodia, Burma, Thailand and Vietnam. Upon his return to India, he placed the relics inside the Sanchi Stupa in November 1952.

== Death ==
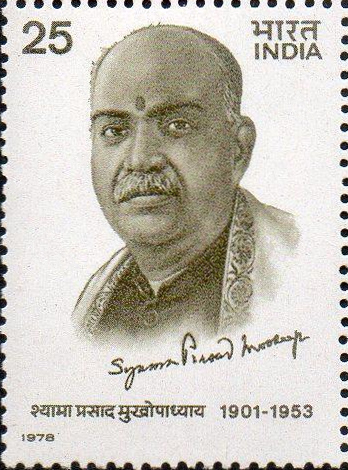
Shyama Prasad Mukherjee on a 1978 stamp of India

Mukherjee was arrested upon entering Kashmir on 11 May 1953. He and two of his arrested companions were first taken to Central Jail of Srinagar. Later they were transferred to a cottage outside the city. Mukherjee's condition started deteriorating and he started feeling pain in the back and high temperature on the night between 19 and 20 June. He was diagnosed with dry pleurisy from which he had also suffered in 1937 and 1944. The doctor prescribed him a streptomycin injection and powders, however, Mukherjee informed him that his family physician had told him that streptomycin did not suit his system. The doctor, however, told him that new information about the drug had come to light and assured him that he would be fine. On 22 June, he felt pain in the heart region, started perspiring and started feeling like he was fainting. He was later shifted to a hospital and provisionally diagnosed with a heart attack. He died a day later. The state government declared that he had died on 23 June at 3:40 a.m. due to a heart attack.

His death in custody raised wide suspicion across the country and demands for an independent inquiry were raised, including earnest requests from his mother, Jogamaya Devi, to Nehru. The prime minister declared that he had asked several persons who were privy to the facts and, according to him, there was no mystery behind Mukherjee's death. Devi did not accept Nehru's reply and requested an impartial inquiry. Nehru, however, ignored the letter and no inquiry commission was set up.

Atal Bihari Vajpayee claimed in 2004 that the arrest of Mukherjee in Jammu and Kashmir was a "Nehru conspiracy" and that the death of Mukherjee has remained "even now a mystery". The BJP in 2011 called for an inquiry to probe Mukherjee's death.

== Legacy ==
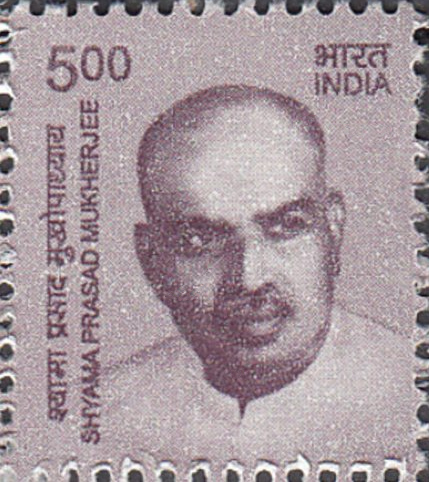
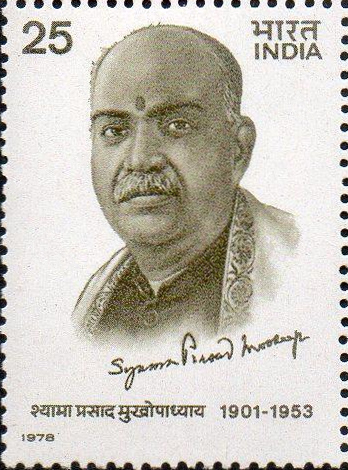
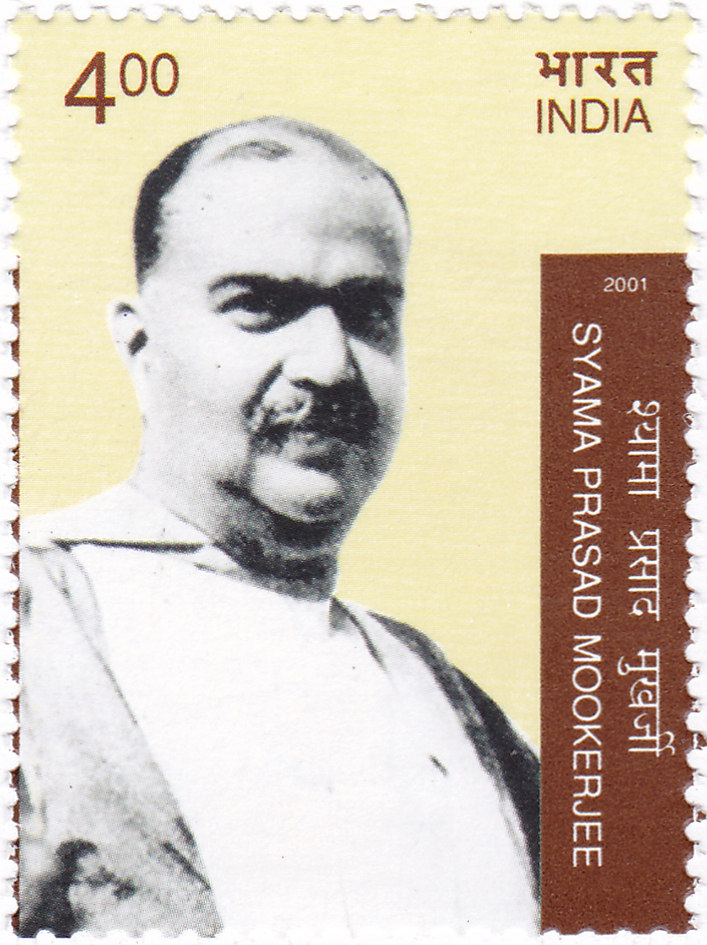
Shyama Prasad Mukherjee on Stamps of India

One of the main thoroughfares in Calcutta, formerly known as Russa Road, was renamed Syama Prasad Mukherjee Road on 3 July 1953 a few days after his death. Syamaprasad College founded by him in 1945 in Kolkata is named after him. Shyama Prasad Mukherji College of University of Delhi was established in 1969 in his memory. On 7 August 1998, the Ahmedabad Municipal Corporation named a bridge after Mukherjee. Delhi has a major road named after Mukherjee called Shyama Prasad Mukherjee Marg. Kolkata, too, has a major road called Shyama Prasad Mukherjee Road. In 2001, the main research funding institute of the Government of India, CSIR, instituted a new fellowship named after him. Also Delhi Has a neibhorhood Mukherjee Nagar named after him,which is loacted in North West Delhi district

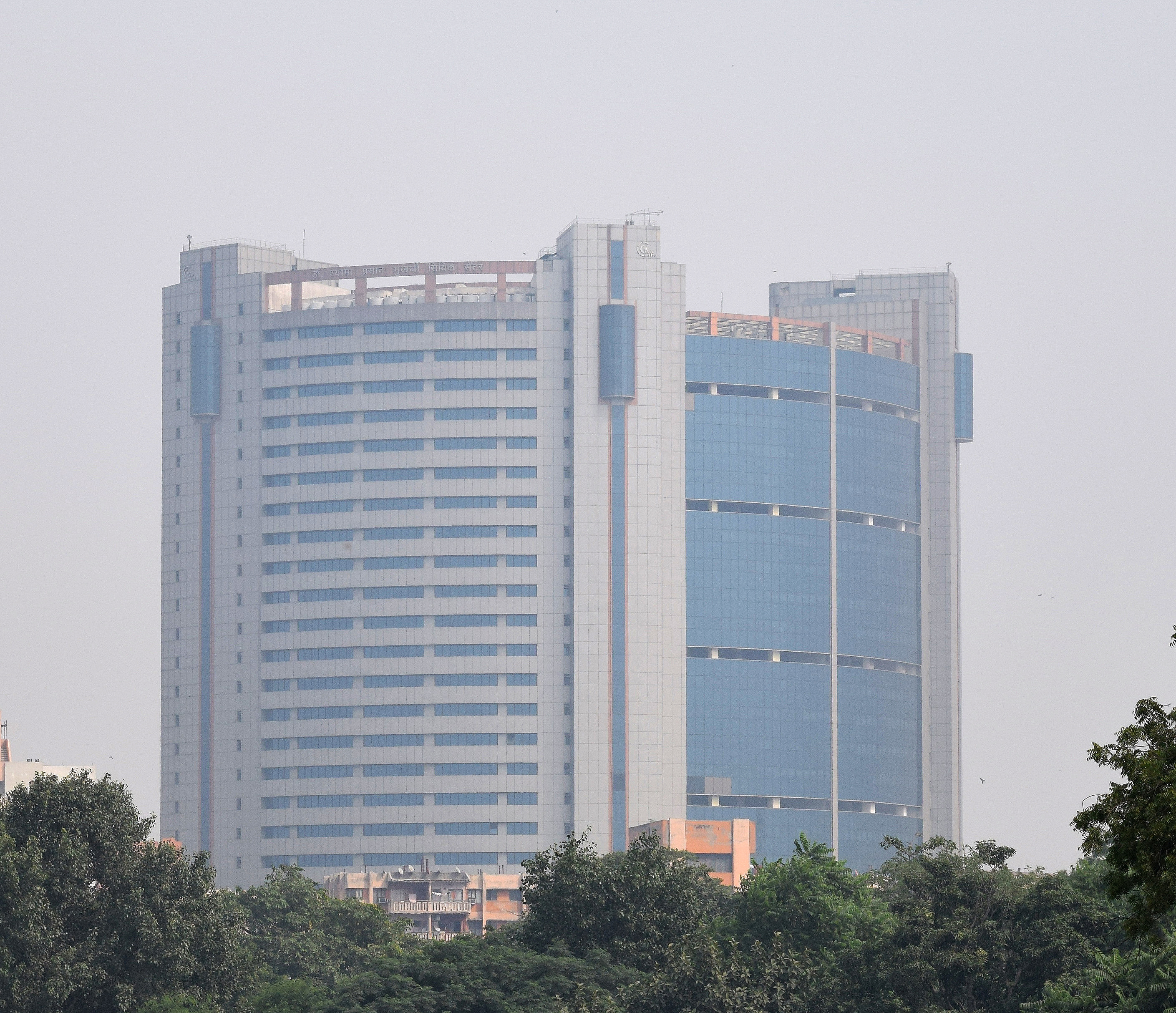
Shyam Prasad Mukherjee Civic Centre, Headquarters of Municipal Corporation of Delhi

On 22 April 2010, the Municipal Corporation of Delhi's (MCD) newly constructed Rs. 650-crore building, the tallest building in Delhi, was named the Doctor Syama Prasad Mukherjee Civic Centre. It was inaugurated by Home Minister P. Chidambaram. The building, which is estimated to cater to 20,000 visitors per day, will also house different wings and offices of the MCD. The MCD also built the Syama Prasad Swimming Pool Complex which hosted aquatic events during the 2010 Commonwealth Games held in New Delhi.

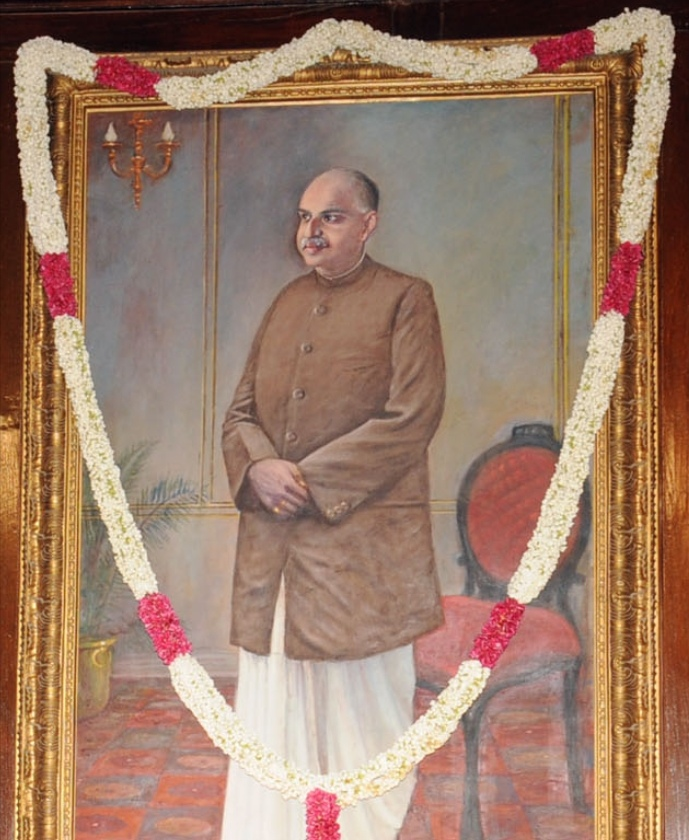
Portrait of Syama Prasad Mukherjee in Parliament of India

In 2012, a flyover at Mathikere in Bangalore City Limits was inaugurated and named the Dr Syama Prasad Mukherjee Flyover. The International Institute of Information Technology, Naya Raipur is named after him.

In 2014, a multipurpose indoor stadium built on the Goa University campus in Goa was named after Mukherjee.

The government of India approved the Shyama Prasad Mukherji Rurban Mission (SPMRM) with an outlay of ₹51.42 billion (US$530 million) on 16 September 2015. The Mission was launched by the Prime Minister on 21 February 2016 at Kurubhata, Murmunda Rurban Cluster, Rajnandgaon, Chhattisgarh. In April 2017, Ranchi College was upgraded to Shyama Prasad Mukherjee University. In September 2017, Kolar, a town in Bhopal, Madhya Pradesh, was renamed Shyama Prasad Mukherji Nagar by the state's Chief Minister Shivraj Singh Chauhan.

Gajendra Chauhan played the role of Mukherjee in the movie 1946 Calcutta Killings.

On 12 January 2020, the Kolkata Port Trust was renamed Syama Prasad Mukherjee Port by prime minister Narendra Modi.

The Chenani-Nashri Tunnel on NH44 in Jammu and Kashmir was renamed after Mukherjee by the Indian government in 2020.

== See also ==
- Bharatiya Janata Party
- Syama Prasad Mookerjee: Life and Times
