= Bharatiya Jana Sangh =

Former Indian political party

Akhil Bharatiya Jana Sangh
- Founder: Shyama Prasad Mukherjee
- Founded: 21 October 1951; 75 years ago
- Dissolved: 23 January 1977; 49 years ago
- Split from: Hindu Mahasabha
- Merged into: Janata Party (1977–1980)
- Succeeded by: Bharatiya Janata Party (1980–present)
- Ideology: Hindutva; Hindu nationalism Integral humanism National conservatism Economic nationalism
- Political position: Right-wing to far-right
- Colours: Saffron

Election symbol

The Bharatiya Jana Sangh (abbreviated as BJS or JS, short name: Jan Sangh; lit. 'All-India People's Union') was a Hindutva political party active in India, sitting on the right-wing to far-right of the political spectrum. It was established on 21 October 1951 in Delhi by Shyama Prasad Mukherjee. Jan Sangh was the political arm of Rashtriya Swayamsevak Sangh (RSS), a right-wing Hindutva paramilitary organisation. In 1977, it merged with several other left, centre, and right parties opposed to the Indian National Congress and formed the Janata Party. In 1980, the members of the erstwhile Jan Sangh quit Janata Party after its defeat in the 1980 general election and formed the Bharatiya Janata Party, which is the direct political successor to the Jan Sangh.

== Origins ==
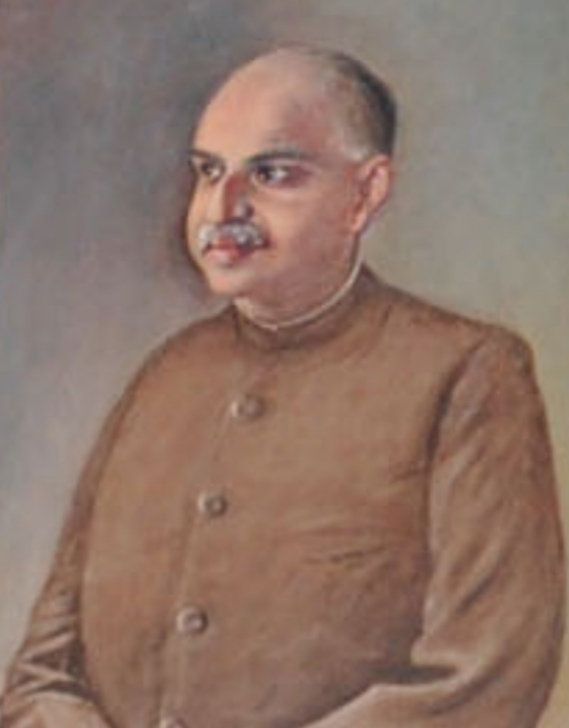
Shyama Prasad Mukherjee, founder of the Bharatiya Jana Sangh.

Many members of the RSS contemplated the formation of a political party during the days of the British Raj, in an attempt to take their ideology further. Around the same time, Shyama Prasad Mukherjee left the Hindu Mahasabha political party that he had once led because of a disagreement with that party over permitting non-Hindu membership.

There were two main reasons for the formation of Jan Sangh, those being the Liaquat–Nehru Pact and the ban on the RSS after the assassination of Mahatma Gandhi.

The state level units of the party were already established in Punjab, P.E.P.S.U. (Patiala and East Punjab States Union), Delhi, West Bengal, Rajasthan, Uttar Pradesh, Madhya Bharat before the party was formally founded at national level. The Bharatiya Jana Sangh was subsequently founded by Mukherjee on 21 October 1951 in Delhi under the RSS, as a "nationalistic alternative" to the Indian National Congress.

== History ==
The first plenary session of Jan Sangh was held at Kanpur in December 1952.

After the death of Mukherjee in 1953, RSS activists in the BJS edged out the career politicians and made it a political arm of the RSS and an integral part of the RSS family of organisations (Sangh Parivar).

The strongest election performance of the BJS came in the 1967 Lok Sabha election in which it won 35 seats, when the Congress majority was its thinnest ever.

The party secured six out of seven parliamentary seats in Delhi and went on to wrest control of the Metropolitan Council and Municipal corporation.

== Ideology ==
When BJS was formed, an 8-point programme was adopted.This formed the core of its ideology over the next years.

The BJS leadership fervently supported a strong policy against Pakistan and China, and were averse to communism and the Soviet Union. Many BJS leaders also initiated the drive to ban cow slaughter nationwide in the early 1960s. Establishment of full relations with Israel was also a demand in the party manifesto. Uniform Civil Code was mentioned in the 1967 manifesto which said that the party would enact UCC if it came to power.

== List of presidents ==
#	Portrait	Name	Term
1		Shyama Prasad Mukherjee	1951–52
2		Mauli Chandra Sharma	1954
3		Prem Nath Dogra	1955
4		Debaprasad Ghosh	1956–59
5		Pitamber Das	1960
6		Avasarala Rama Rao	1961
(4)		Debaprasad Ghosh	1962
7		Raghu Vira	1963
(4)		Debaprasad Ghosh	1964
8		Bachhraj Vyas	1965
9		Balraj Madhok	1966
10		Deendayal Upadhyaya	1967–68
11		Atal Bihari Vajpayee	1968–72
12		L. K. Advani	1973–77
See List of national presidents of the Bharatiya Janata Party

== In general elections ==
The Bharatiya Jana Sangh was created in 1951, and the first general election it contested was in 1951–52, in which it won only three Lok Sabha seats, in line with the four seats won by Hindu Mahasabha and three seats won by Ram Rajya Parishad. Shyama Prasad Mukherjee and Durga Charan Banerjee were elected from Calcutta South East constituency and Midnapore Jhargram constituency in West Bengal and Uma Shankar Trivedi from Chittor constituency in Rajasthan. All the like-minded parties formed a block in the Parliament, led by Shyama Prasad Mukherjee.

Year	Lok Sabha	Seats won	±	Voteshare (%)	± (%)	Outcome
1952	1st	3 / 499	▲3	3.06%	▲3.06%	Opposition
1957	2nd	4 / 505	▲1	5.93%	▲2.87%	Opposition
1962	3rd	14 / 508	▲10	6.44%	▲0.51%	Opposition
1967	4th	35 / 523	▲21	9.31%	▲2.87%	Opposition
1971	5th	22 / 521	▼13	7.35%	▼1.96%	Opposition
