= V. Satish =

Indian politician

V Satish
- Satish Velankar
- Born: 23 May 1954 (age 72); Nagpur, Maharashtra, India
- Occupation: Politician
- Office: National Organiser
- Political party: Bharatiya Janata Party
- Website: www.bjp.org/organisation/office-bearers

V Satish (Satish Velankar) is an Indian politician and the National Organiser of the Bharatiya Janata Party. Currently he is looking after BJP's SC/ST Morcha, Bharatiya Janata Party Parliamentary Office and he is a Core Team Member of National Training Department.

== Early life and education ==
Born in Nagpur district of Maharashtra on 23 June 1954. He hails from Parbhani in Maharashtra. He completed BA in 1973 from Shri Shivaji College, Parbhani and completed MA in Sociology in 1975 from Mumbai University. He also completed a diploma in Journalism in 1974 from Bharatiya Vidya Bhavan. His father, Narayanrao Welankar was a lifelong social worker and a former full-time worker (Pracharak) of Rashtriya Swayamsevak Sangh.

== Career ==
Satish was a full-time worker of Akhil Bharatiya Vidyarthi Parishad from 1975 to 1998 in the northeastern states of India before transitioning to the BJP Assam Unit. He held the position of Zonal Organizing Secretary for ABVP within the North East Zone. Since 1998 he played various important roles in Bharatiya Janata Party. He worked in North Eastern, Southern and Western states of India during all these years. He has been working from BJP's Delhi headquarter since 2020.

At present, he serves as the National Organizer for the BJP under the leadership of J. P. Nadda. Also, he serves as a chief coordinator of the Party's training committee. Previously, he held the role of Joint National General Secretary (Organization).

Preceded by Saudan Singh	Joint National General Secretary (Organisation) of Bhartiya Janta Party; 2010—2014	Succeeded by Shiv Prakash
Preceded by New Post	National Organiser of Bhartiya Janta Party; 2019—present	
