= Mohammad Anwar Khan (Indian politician) =

Indian politician

Personal details
- Born: March 15, 1976 (age 50) Baramulla, Jammu and Kashmir
- Party: Bharatiya Janata Party
- Occupation: Politician
- Known for: General Secretary of the BJP, Jammu and Kashmir; surviving terrorist attacks

Mohammad Anwar Khan (born 15 March 1976) is an Indian politician affiliated with the Bharatiya Janata Party (BJP) from the Union Territory of Jammu and Kashmir. He serves as the General Secretary of the BJP Jammu and Kashmir and is a member of the BJP National Executive. Khan has survived multiple terrorist attacks due to his political affiliation.

== Political career ==
Khan began his political career as the District General Secretary for Baramulla, also holding responsibilities for Kupwara district.

In September 2024, Khan was designated as the in-charge coordinator for Prime Minister Narendra Modi's rally at Sher-e-Kashmir Park, Srinagar, organised ahead of the Jammu and Kashmir Assembly elections.

He later became a Party Observer and played a significant role in the BJP's membership drive in Jammu and Kashmir in 2024. He was honored by the party leadership for achieving the highest enrollment figures during the campaign.

In January 2025, Khan was appointed to the National Executive of the Bharatiya Janata Party, a top decision-making body within the party.

In July 2025, he was elevated to the position of General Secretary of BJP Jammu and Kashmir. His appointment marked the first time a Kashmiri Muslim held this position within the state party leadership.

== Assassination Attempts ==
Due to his active political role in a conflict-prone region, Khan has been the target of multiple terrorist attacks.

In March 2018, militants opened fire near his convoy in Pulwama district’s Khanmoh area, injuring his personal security officer. Khan escaped unharmed.

On April 1, 2021, militants attacked Khan's residence in Aaribagh, Nowgam, in Srinagar, killing his security guard Constable Rameez Raja. Khan was not present at the time. Militants also snatched the guard's rifle before fleeing. A day later, three militants involved in the attack were killed by security forces in an encounter in Pulwama district.

== Public Recognition ==
Khan was the only BJP leader from the Kashmir Valley to share the stage with Union Home Minister Amit Shah and Lieutenant Governor Manoj Sinha during a large political rally in Baramulla in 2022.

== See also ==
- Politics of Jammu and Kashmir
- Bharatiya Janata Party
- Insurgency in Jammu and Kashmir
