= List of largest political parties =

This is a list of political parties by reported number of members. These reported membership numbers (Note: The definition of "membership" varies widely from nation to nation, which has a significant bearing on the numbers and percentages listed on this page. For example, United Kingdom memberships are limited to paid-up subscribers to each party. By this description the three dominant parties – Conservative, Labour and Reform UK – in total have less than 700,000 members, and are less than one per cent of the UK population. At an opposite extreme, United States memberships can include all registered voters who have self-identified their party preference, and who may number in the tens of millions, making their percentages of US population comparatively large.) are usually claimed by the parties themselves and are not necessarily confirmed by independent studies.

== Active political parties ==
=== Parties with over 100 million members ===
List of currently active political parties with over 100,000,000 members
| Rank | Name | Abbreviation | Party symbol | Country | Active since | Claimed number of members (year) | Approximate percentage of population (year) (Note: Based on the claimed number of members and the population statistics of the country during the given year.) |
|---|---|---|---|---|---|---|---|
| 1 | Bharatiya Janata Party; Indian People's Party | BJP | | India | 6 April 1980 (46 years ago) | 140 million (2025) | 9.52% (2025) |
| 2 | Chinese Communist Party | CCP; CPC | | China | 23 July 1921 (105 years ago) | 101.29 million (2025) | 7.21% (2025) |

=== Parties with 10 million – 100 million members ===
List of currently active political parties with 10,000,000 – 100,000,000 members
| Rank | Name | Abbreviation | Party symbol | Country | Active since | Claimed number of members (year) | Approximate percentage of population (year) |
|---|---|---|---|---|---|---|---|
| 3 | Democratic Party | D DEM | | United States | 8 January 1828 (198 years ago) | 44.1 million (2025) (Note: Only includes voters registered as party affiliates in the District of Columbia and the 32 states which allow voter registration with a specific party; in the United States, it is this voter registration which determines eligibility to vote in the party's internal elections such as primaries, rather than the party's dues-paying membership as in the rest of the world. Jurisdictions include Alaska, Arizona, Arkansas, California, Colorado, Connecticut, Delaware, District of Columbia, Florida, Idaho, Iowa, Kansas, Kentucky, Louisiana, Maine, Maryland, Massachusetts, Missouri, Nebraska, Nevada, New Hampshire, New Jersey, New Mexico, New York, North Carolina, Oklahoma, Oregon, Pennsylvania, South Dakota, Utah, West Virginia and Wyoming. The overall numbers in the remaining states lean heavily Republican so the total percentage of the population that's Democrat or Republican is much closer than these values depict.) | 12.67% (2025) |
| 4 | Republican Party | R GOP; REP | | United States | 20 March 1854 (172 years ago) | 37.4 million (2025) | 10.75% (2025) |
| 5 | Indian National Congress | INC; CONG | | India | 28 December 1885 (140 years ago) | 26 million (2022) | 1.8% (2022) |
| 6 | Dravida Munnetra Kazhagam; Dravidian Progressive Federation | DMK | | India | 17 September 1949 (77 years ago) | 25 million (2026) | 1.38% (2026) |
| 7 | All India Anna Dravida Munnetra Kazhagam; All India Anna Dravidian Progressive Federation | AIADMK | | India | 17 October 1972 (54 years ago) | 20,044,400 (2023) | 1.4% (2023) |
| 8 | Tamilaga Vettri Kazhagam | TVK | | India | 2 February 2024 (2 years ago) | 15 million (2025) | 1.03% (2025) |
| 9 | Chama Cha Mapinduzi; Party of the Revolution | CCM | | Tanzania | 5 February 1977 (49 years ago) | 12 million (2022) | 19% (2022) |
| 10 | Justice and Development Party | AKP AK Party | | Turkey | 14 August 2001 (25 years ago) | 11,709,913 (2024) | 12.93% (2024) |
| 11 | National Regeneration Movement | Morena | | Mexico | 10 July 2014 (12 years ago) | 11,629,541 (2026) | 15.38% (2026) |
| 12 | Prosperity Party | PP | | Ethiopia | 1 December 2019 (6 years ago) | 11 million (2022) | 11% (2022) |
| 13 | Aam Aadmi Party; Common Man's Party | AAP | | India | 26 November 2012 (13 years ago) | 10.05 million (2014) | 0.81% (2014) |
| 14 | Pakistan Tehreek-e-Insaf; Pakistan Movement for Justice | PTI | | Pakistan | 25 April 1996 (30 years ago) | 10 million (2012) | 5.34% (2012) |
| 15 | Telugu Desam Party; Party of the Telugu Land | TDP | | India | 29 March 1982 (44 years ago) | 10,052,598 (2025) | 0.69% (2025) |

=== Parties with 1 million – 10 million members ===
List of currently active political parties with 1,000,000 – 10,000,000 members
| Rank | Name | Abbreviation | Party symbol | Country | Active since | Claimed number of members (year) | Approximate percentage of population (year) |
|---|---|---|---|---|---|---|---|
| 16 | Workers' Party of Korea | WPK | | North Korea | 30 June 1949 (77 years ago) | 6.5 million (2021) | 25.07% (2021) |
| 17 | Cambodian People's Party | CPP | | Cambodia | 28 June 1951 (75 years ago) | 6 million (2020) | 35.89% (2020) |
| 18 | Communist Party of Vietnam | CPV | | Vietnam | 3 February 1930 (96 years ago) | 5.3 million (2021) | 5.4% (2021) |
| 19 | Democratic Party of Korea | DPK | | South Korea | 26 March 2014 (12 years ago) | 5,129,314 (2023) | 9.92% (2023) |
| 20 | People Power Party | PPP | | South Korea | 17 February 2020 (6 years ago) | 4,449,281 (2023) | 8.6% (2023) |
| 21 | United Socialist Party of Venezuela | PSUV | | Venezuela | 24 March 2007 (19 years ago) | 4,240,032 (2024) | 14.28% (2024) |
| 22 | Zimbabwe African National Union – Patriotic Front | ZANU-PF | | Zimbabwe | 18 March 1975 (51 years ago) | 3,900,000 (2022) | 25.69% (2022) |
| 23 | Justicialist Party | PJ | | Argentina | 21 November 1946 (80 years ago) | 3,818,678 (2019) | 8.5% (2019) |
| 24 | United Malays National Organisation | UMNO | | Malaysia | 11 May 1946 (80 years ago) | 3,525,000 (2026) | 10.1% (2022) |
| 25 | People's Movement for the Liberation of Angola | MPLA | | Angola | 10 December 1956 (69 years ago) | 2.7 million (2008) | 14% (2008) |
| 26 | Colorado Party | ANR-PC | | Paraguay | 11 September 1887 (139 years ago) | 2,616,424 (2022) | 42.82% (2022) |
| 27 | Movement of Entrepreneurs and Businessmen – Uzbekistan Liberal Democratic Party | OʻzLiDeP | | Uzbekistan | 15 November 2003 (23 years ago) | 2,307,642 (2026) | 6.15% (2026) |
| 28 | United Russia | YR | | Russia | 1 December 2001 (24 years ago) | 2,073,772 (2013) | 1.45% (2013) |
| 29 | Brazilian Democratic Movement | MDB | | Brazil | 4 December 1965 (60 years ago) | 2,030,607 (2025) | 0.95% (2026) |
| 30 | Radical Civic Union | UCR | | Argentina | 21 June 1891 (135 years ago) | 1,992,472 (2017) | 4.52% (2017) |
| 31 | Workers' Party | PT | | Brazil | 10 February 1980 (46 years ago) | 1,673,623 (2025) | 0.78% (2026) |
| 32 | Authentic Radical Liberal Party | PLRA | | Paraguay | 10 July 1887 (139 years ago) | 1,548,023 (2022) | 25.33% (2022) |
| 33 | Partido Federal ng Pilipinas; Federal Party of the Philippines | PFP | | Philippines | 5 October 2018 (8 years ago) | 1.5 million (2021) | 1.35% (2021) |
| 34 | Republican People's Party | CHP | | Turkey | 9 September 1923 (103 years ago) | 1,879,973 (2024) | 1.67% (2023) |
| 35 | Progressistas; Progressives | PP | | Brazil | 16 November 1995 (31 years ago) | 1,296,058 (2025) | 0.6% (2026) |
| 36 | Democratic Renewal Party | PRD | | Brazil | 26 October 2022 (4 years ago) | 1,292,479 (2025) | 0.6% (2026) |
| 37 | Brazilian Social Democracy Party | PSDB | | Brazil | 25 June 1988 (38 years ago) | 1,269,131 (2025) | 0.59% (2026) |
| 38 | People's Justice Party | PKR | | Malaysia | 10 December 1998 (27 years ago) | 1,153,212 (2024) | 3.38% (2024) |
| 39 | Kuomintang; Nationalist Party | KMT | | Taiwan (ROC) | 10 October 1919 (107 years ago) | 1,090,000 (2017) | 4.62% (2017) |
| 40 | Economic Freedom Fighters | EFF | | South Africa | 26 July 2013 (13 years ago) | 1,085,843 (2022) | 1.75% (2022) |
| 41 | Democratic Labour Party | PDT | | Brazil | 17 June 1979 (47 years ago) | 1,081,821 (2025) | 0.5% (2026) |
| 42 | Brazil Union | UNIÃO | | Brazil | 6 October 2021 (5 years ago) | 1,074,822 (2025) | 0.5% (2026) |
| 43 | Communist Party of India (Marxist) | CPI(M) CPM | | India | 7 November 1964 (62 years ago) | 1,019,009 (2024) | 0.07% (2024) |
| 44 | Malaysian Islamic Party | PAS | | Malaysia | 24 November 1951 (74 years ago) | 1,005,700 (2022) | 2.89% (2022) |
| 45 | National Liberation Front | FLN | | Algeria | 23 October 1954 (72 years ago) | 1 million (2019) | 2.32% (2019) |

=== Parties with 100 thousand – 1 million members ===
List of currently active political parties with 100,000 – 1,000,000 members
| Rank | Name | Abbreviation | Party symbol | Country | Active since | Claimed number of members (year) | Approximate percentage of population (year) |
|---|---|---|---|---|---|---|---|
| 46 | Nepali Congress | NC | | Nepal | 9 April 1950 (76 years ago) | 969,842 (2026) | 3.32% (2026) |
| 47 | Liberal Democratic Party | LDP | | Japan | 15 November 1955 (71 years ago) | 915,574 (2025) | 0.74% (2025) |
| 48 | Liberal Party | PL | | Brazil | 25 June 1985 (41 years ago) | 895,522 (2025) | 0.41% (2025) |
| 49 | Serbian Progressive Party | SNS | | Serbia | 21 October 2008 (18 years ago) | 840,000 (2020) | 11.69% (2020) |
| 50 | Golkar Party; Party of Functional Groups | | | Indonesia | 20 October 1964 (62 years ago) | 832,842 (2024) | 0.29% (2024) |
| 51 | Institutional Revolutionary Party | PRI | | Mexico | 4 March 1929 (97 years ago) | 819,103 (2026) | 1.1% (2023) |
| 52 | People's Party | PP | | Spain | 20 January 1989 (37 years ago) | 806,000 (2024) | 1.63% (2024) |
| 53 | Amanat; Covenant | | | Kazakhstan | 12 February 1999 (27 years ago) | 800,000 (2023) | 3.94% (2023) |
| 54 | Podemos; We Can | PODE | | Brazil | 5 March 1995 (31 years ago) | 799,916 (2025) | 0.37% (2026) |
| 55 | New Azerbaijan Party | YAP | | Azerbaijan | 21 November 1992 (34 years ago) | 773,770 (2022) | 7.51% (2022) |
| 56 | African National Congress | ANC | | South Africa | 8 January 1912 (114 years ago) | 769,000 (2015) | 1.39% (2015) |
| 57 | Malaysian United Indigenous Party | BERSATU PPBM | | Malaysia | 14 January 2017 (9 years ago) | 700,000 (2024) | 2.05% (2024) |
| 58 | Libertarian Party | LP | | United States | 11 December 1971 (54 years ago) | 693,634 (2021) | 0.2% (2021) |
| 59 | Conservative Party of Canada | CPC PCC | | Canada | 7 December 2003 (22 years ago) | 678,708 (2022) | 1.56% (2022) |
| 60 | Communist Party of Cuba | PCC | | Cuba | 3 October 1965 (61 years ago) | 670,000 (2016) | 5.96% (2016) |
| 61 | Communist Party of India | CPI | | India | 26 December 1925 (100 years ago) | 650,000 (2022) | 0.05% (2022) |
| 62 | Brazilian Socialist Party | PSB | | Brazil | 2 July 1985 (41 years ago) | 642,913 (2025) | 0.3% (2026) |
| 63 | Austrian People's Party | ÖVP | | Austria | 17 April 1945 (81 years ago) | 600,000 (2017) | 6.8% (2017) |
| 64 | Republicans | | | Brazil | 16 December 2003 (22 years ago) | 565,656 (2025) | 0.26% (2026) |
| 65 | National Mandate Party | PAN | | Indonesia | 23 August 1998 (28 years ago) | 560,677 (2024) | 0.2% (2024) |
| 66 | Communist Party of Nepal (Unified Marxist–Leninist) | CPN (UML) | | Nepal | 6 January 1991 (35 years ago) | 550,000 (2022) | 1.8% (2022) |
| 67 | People's Democratic Party of Uzbekistan | XDP | | Uzbekistan | 1 November 1991 (35 years ago) | 520,000 (2021) | 1.49% (2021) |
| 68 | Social Democratic Party | PSD | | Romania | 16 June 2001 (25 years ago) | 509,000 (2014) | 2.55% (2014) |
| 69 | New Ideas | N NI | | El Salvador | 25 October 2017 (9 years ago) | 507,677 (2019) | 7.64% (2019) |
| 70 | National United Front for an Independent, Neutral, Peaceful and Cooperative Cambodia | FUNCINPEC | | Cambodia | 21 March 1981 (45 years ago) | 500,000 (2019) | 2.99% (2019) |
| 71 | Nationalist Movement Party | MHP | | Turkey | 9 February 1969 (57 years ago) | 498,021 (2025) | 0.58% (2025) |
| 72 | Gerindra Party; Great Indonesia Movement Party | | | Indonesia | 6 February 2008 (18 years ago) | 495,699 (2024) | 0.17% (2024) |
| 73 | Indonesian Democratic Party of Struggle | PDI-P; PDIP; PDI Perjuangan | | Indonesia | 10 January 1973 (53 years ago) | 472,643 (2024) | 0.16% (2024) |
| 74 | Social Democratic Party | PSD | | Brazil | 21 March 2011 (15 years ago) | 465,218 (2025) | 0.21% (2026) |
| 75 | Ecologist Green Party of Mexico | V PVEM; PVE | | Mexico | 14 May 1993 (33 years ago) | 460,554 (2020) | 0.37% (2020) |
| 76 | Komeito | NKP | | Japan | 17 November 1964 (62 years ago) | 450,000 (2024) | 0.36% (2024) |
| 76 | United Sabah Party | PBS | | Malaysia | 5 March 1985 (41 years ago) | 450,000 (2021) | 1.38% (2021) (Note: In Malaysia) |
| 78 | Cidadania; Citizenship | | | Brazil | 26 January 1992 (34 years ago) | 416,826 (2025) | 0.19% (2026) |
| 79 | Renaissance | RE | | France | 6 April 2016 (10 years ago) | 411,892 (2019) | 0.64% (2019) |
| 80 | Hong Kong Federation of Trade Unions | FTU | | Hong Kong | 17 April 1948 (78 years ago) | 410,000 (2014) | 5.66% (2014) |
| 81 | Liberal Party of Canada | LPC PLC | | Canada | 1 July 1867 (159 years ago) | 400,000 (2025) | 0.96% (2025) |
| 82 | United Development Party | PPP P3 | | Indonesia | 5 January 1973 (53 years ago) | 443,197 (2023) | 0.16% (2023) |
| 83 | Good Party | İYİ İP İYİP | | Turkey | 25 October 2017 (9 years ago) | 391,731 (2025) | 0.5% (2025) |
| 84 | Alliance for Progress | APP | | Peru | 8 December 2001 (24 years ago) | 389,200 (2026) | 0.84% (2026) |
| 85 | Communist Party of Brazil | PCdoB | | Brazil | 18 February 1962 (64 years ago) | 385,406 (2025) | 0.18% (2026) |
| 86 | National Awakening Party | PKB | | Indonesia | 23 July 1998 (28 years ago) | 384,637 (2024) | 0.13% (2024) |
| 87 | Solidarity | | | Brazil | 25 October 2012 (14 years ago) | 376,193 (2025) | 0.17% (2026) |
| 88 | Christian Democratic Union of Germany | CDU | | Germany | 20 June 1945 (81 years ago) | 371,986 (2023) | 0.44% (2023) |
| 89 | La France Insoumise; Unsubmissive France | FI; LFI | | France | 10 February 2016 (10 years ago) | 370,000 (2023) | 0.5% (2023) |
| 90 | New Welfare Party | YRP; Yeniden Refah | | Turkey | 23 November 2018 (7 years ago) | 365,767 (2024) | 0.43% (2023) |
| 91 | Social Democratic Party of Germany | SPD | | Germany | 23 May 1863 (163 years ago) | 365,190 (2024) | 0.44% (2024) |
| 92 | China Democratic League | CDL | | China | 17 April 1948 (78 years ago) | 356,900 (2023) | 0.03% (2023) |
| 93 | Lao People's Revolutionary Party | LPRP | | Laos | 22 March 1955 (71 years ago) | 348,686 (2021) | 4.7% (2021) |
| 94 | Green Party | PV | | Brazil | 17 January 1986 (40 years ago) | 342,876 (2025) | 0.16% (2026) |
| 95 | Democrat Party | DP | | Turkey | 27 May 2007 (19 years ago) | 342,256 (2024) | 0.4% (2023) |
| 96 | Auyl Party; Village Party | AHDPP | | Kazakhstan | 30 January 2000 (26 years ago) | 301,487 (2026) | 1.43% (2026) |
| 97 | New Progressive Party | PNP | | Puerto Rico | 20 August 1967 (59 years ago) | 297,998 (2020) | 9.07% (2020) |
| 98 | Popular Action | AP | | Peru | 7 July 1956 (70 years ago) | 297,884 (2026) | 0.87% (2026) |
| 99 | Liberal Democratic Party of Russia | LDPR | | Russia | 18 April 1992 (34 years ago) | 295,018 (2019) | 0.2% (2019) |
| 100 | Socialism and Liberty Party | PSOL | | Brazil | 6 June 2004 (22 years ago) | 291,190 (2025) | 0.13% (2026) |
| 101 | Mongolian People's Party | MPP | | Mongolia | 25 June 1921 (105 years ago) | 287,283 (2023) | 8.9% (2023) |
| 102 | Prosperous Justice Party | PKS | | Indonesia | 20 July 1998 (28 years ago) | 284,388 (2024) | 0.1% (2024) |
| 103 | Reform UK | REF | | United Kingdom | 23 November 2018 (7 years ago) | 269,000 (2025) | 0.39% (2025) |
| 104 | National Liberal Party | PNL | | Romania | 24 May 1875 (151 years ago) | 253,895 (2018) | 1.3% (2018) |
| 105 | Japanese Communist Party | JCP | | Japan | 15 July 1922 (104 years ago) | 250,000 (2024) | 0.2% (2024) |
| 106 | Congolese Party of Labour | PCT | | Republic of the Congo | 29 December 1969 (56 years ago) | 250,000 (2005) | 7.06% (2005) |
| 107 | Labour Party | LAB | | United Kingdom | 23 July 1900 (126 years ago) | 250,000 (2025) | 0.36% (2025) |
| 108 | Labor Party | PT | | Mexico | 8 December 1990 (35 years ago) | 249,384 (2020) | 0.2% (2020) |
| 109 | Green Party of the United States | GPUS | | United States | April 2001 (25 years ago) | 246,377 (2020) | 0.07% (2020) |
| 110 | Avante; Forward | | | Brazil | 11 November 1989 (37 years ago) | 243,504 (2025) | 0.11% (2026) |
| 111 | Felicity Party | SP SAADET | | Turkey | 20 July 2001 (25 years ago) | 243,312 (2024) | 0.29% (2023) |
| 112 | Democratic Progressive Party | DPP | | Taiwan (ROC) | 28 September 1986 (40 years ago) | 238,664 (2023) | 0.46% (2023) |
| 113 | Social Democratic Movement | DEM | | Bolivia | 15 December 2013 (12 years ago) | 238,002 (2025) | 2.10% (2025) |
| 114 | China National Democratic Construction Association | CNDCA | | China | 22 March 1955 (71 years ago) | 237,526 (2024) | 0.02% (2024) |
| 115 | The Republicans | LR | | France | 30 May 2015 (11 years ago) | 234,556 (2017) | 0.36% (2017) |
| 116 | National Action Party | PAN | | Mexico | 16 September 1939 (87 years ago) | 234,450 (2020) | 0.19% (2020) |
| 117 | Citizens' Movement | MC | | Mexico | 1 August 1998 (28 years ago) | 229,474 (2020) | 0.18% (2020) |
| 118 | Croatian Democratic Union | HDZ | | Croatia | 17 June 1989 (37 years ago) | 220,000 (2017) | 5.33% (2017) |
| 118 | South African Communist Party | SACP | | South Africa | 12 February 1921 (105 years ago) | 220,000 (2015) | 0.4% (2015) |
| 119 | Free Peru | PL | | Peru | 13 August 2008 (18 years ago) | 219,140 (2026) | 0.64% (2026) |
| 120 | Popular Democratic Party | PPD | | Puerto Rico | 22 July 1938 (88 years ago) | 218,900 (2020) | 6.66% (2020) |
| 121 | Jiusan Society; Academic Society | JS | | China | 3 September 1945 (81 years ago) | 211,738 (2023) | 0.01% (2023) |
| 122 | Democratic Party of Turkmenistan | TDP | | Turkmenistan | 16 December 1991 (34 years ago) | 211,000 (2019) | 3.5% (2019) |
| 123 | National Mobilization | MOBILIZA | | Brazil | 21 April 1984 (42 years ago) | 208,208 (2025) | 0.09% (2026) |
| 124 | Belaya Rus; White Rus | BR | | Belarus | 17 November 2007 (19 years ago) | 200,000 (2026) | 2.2% (2026) |
| 124 | China Association for Promoting Democracy | CAPD | | China | 30 December 1945 (80 years ago) | 200,000 (2023) | 0.01% (2023) |
| 124 | Citizen Revolution Movement | RC | | Ecuador | 18 August 2016 (10 years ago) | 200,000 (2022) | 1.11% (2022) |
| 125 | Agir; Act | | | Brazil | 11 July 1985 (41 years ago) | 195,711 (2025) | 0.09% (2026) |
| 126 | Alliance of Independent Social Democrats | SNSD | | Bosnia and Herzegovina | 10 March 1996 (30 years ago) | 192,707 (2019) | 5.64% (2019) |
| 127 | Chinese Peasants' and Workers' Democratic Party | CPWDP | | China | 9 August 1930 (96 years ago) | 192,000 (2022) | 0.01% (2022) |
| 128 | Creating Opportunities | CREO | | Ecuador | 20 August 2012 (14 years ago) | 184,299 (2016) | 1.11% (2016) |
| 129 | Democratic Left | ID | | Ecuador | 1970 (56 years ago) | 184,284 (2022) | 1% (2022) |
| 130 | Christian Democracy | DC | | Brazil | 30 March 1995 (31 years ago) | 181,519 (2025) | 0.08% (2026) |
| 131 | Green Party of England and Wales | GPEW | | United Kingdom | July 1990 (36 years ago) | 216,000 (March, 2026) | 0.22% (2025) |
| 132 | Social Democratic Party of Austria | SPÖ | | Austria | 1 January 1889 (137 years ago) | 180,000 (2017) | 2.04% (2017) |
| 133 | Democratic Action Party | DAP | | Malaysia | 11 October 1965 (61 years ago) | 173,000 (2019) | 0.52% (2019) |
| 134 | Spanish Socialist Workers' Party | PSOE | | Spain | 2 May 1879 (147 years ago) | 172,600 (2023) | 0.35% (2024) |
| 135 | Democratic Party | PD | | Italy | 14 October 2007 (19 years ago) | 165,000 (2024) | 0.27% (2024) |
| 136 | Christian Social Party | PSC | | Ecuador | 13 November 1951 (75 years ago) | 161,669 (2022) | 0.88% (2022) |
| 137 | Brothers of Italy | FdI | | Italy | 17 December 2012 (13 years ago) | 160,000 (2017) | 0.26% (2017) |
| 137 | Communist Party of the Russian Federation | CPRF | | Russia | 14 February 1993 (33 years ago) | 160,000 (2015) | 0.11% (2015) |
| 138 | Pachakutik Plurinational Unity Movement – New Country | MUPP | | Ecuador | 1 November 1995 (31 years ago) | 159,961 (2016) | 0.97% (2016) |
| 139 | Revolutionary Committee of the Chinese Kuomintang | RCCK | | China | 1 January 1948 (78 years ago) | 158,000 (2022) | 0.01% (2022) |
| 140 | Democratic Party | DP | | Mongolia | 6 December 2000 (25 years ago) | 150,000 (2020) | 4.47% (2020) |
| 140 | Rastriya Prajatantra Party; National Democratic Party | RPP | | Nepal | 29 May 1990 (36 years ago) | 150,000 (2021) | 1.87% (2021) |
| 141 | Democracy and Progress Party | DEVA | | Turkey | 9 March 2020 (6 years ago) | 146,820 (2024) | 0.17% (2023) |
| 142 | Brazilian Labour Renewal Party | PRTB | | Brazil | 27 November 1994 (31 years ago) | 144,532 (2025) | 0.06% (2026) |
| 143 | Progressive Democratic Party | PDP-N | | Nepal | 11 November 2025 (12 months ago) | 141,715 (2025) | 0.47% (2023) |
| 144 | Movement for Rights and Freedoms | DPS | | Bulgaria | 4 January 1990 (36 years ago) | 140,000 (2018) | 1.99% (2018) |
| 144 | Christian Social Union in Bavaria | CSU | | Germany | 13 October 1945 (81 years ago) | 140,000 (2019) | 0.17% (2019) (Note: In Germany) |
| 145 | Podemos; We Can | | | Spain | 16 January 2014 (12 years ago) | 138,800 (2021) | 0.29% (2021) |
| 146 | Likud – National Liberal Movement | מחל | | Israel | 25 August 1988 (38 years ago) | 137,000 (2022) | 1.41% (2022) |
| 147 | Progressive Conservative Party of Ontario | PC | | Canada | 1854 (172 years ago) | 133,000 (2018) | 0.36% (2018) |
| 148 | Conservative and Unionist Party | Con | | United Kingdom | 23 July 1834 (192 years ago) | 131,680 (2024) | 0.19% (2024) |
| 149 | Social Democratic Party | PPD; PSD | | Portugal | 6 May 1974 (52 years ago) | 129,735 (2018) | 1.26% (2018) |
| 150 | Nationalist Republican Alliance | ARENA | | El Salvador | 30 September 1981 (45 years ago) | 127,543 (2019) | 1.92% (2019) |
| 151 | Socialist Party | PS | | Argentina | 28 June 1896 (130 years ago) | 124,934 (2012) | 0.03% (2012) |
| 152 | United Conservative Party | UCP | | Canada | 31 July 2017 (9 years ago) | 123,915 (2022) | 0.32% (2022) |
| 153 | Lega Nord; Northern League | LN | | Italy | 4 December 1989 (36 years ago) | 122,000 (2013) | 0.2% (2013) |
| 154 | We Are Peru | SP | | Peru | 11 September 1997 (29 years ago) | 121,577 (2020) | 0.37% (2020) |
| 155 | National Rally | RN | | France | 5 October 1972 (54 years ago) | 120,000 (2025) | 0.17% (2025) |
| 156 | Constitution Party | CP | | United States | 1991 (35 years ago) | 118,088 (2020) | 0.04% (2020) |
| 157 | Die Linke; The Left | | | Germany | 16 June 2007 (19 years ago) | 115,623 (2025) | 0.14% (2025) |
| 158 | Republican Proposal | PRO | | Argentina | 3 June 2010 (16 years ago) | 115,481 (2016) | 0.26% (2016) |
| 159 | Five Star Movement | M5S | | Italy | 4 October 2009 (17 years ago) | 115,372 (2019) | 0.19% (2019) |
| 160 | United National Congress | UNC | | Trinidad and Tobago | 30 April 1989 (37 years ago) | 115,000 (2020) | 7.58% (2020) |
| 161 | Constitutional Democratic Party of Japan | CDP CDPJ | | Japan | 3 October 2017 (9 years ago) | 114,839 (2024) | 0.09% (2024) |
| 162 | The Democrats Party – Founded by the Labor Movement | אמת | | Israel | 12 July 2024 (2 years ago) | 112,376 (2026) | 1.01% (2026) |
| 163 | Great Unity Party | BBP BÜYÜK BİRLİK | | Turkey | 29 January 1993 (33 years ago) | 112,277 (2024) | 0.13% (2023) |
| 164 | Socialist Party of Albania | PS | | Albania | 13 June 1991 (35 years ago) | 112,000 (2021) | 3.94% (2021) |
| 165 | Nidaa Tounes; Call of Tunisia | NT | | Tunisia | 16 June 2012 (14 years ago) | 110,000 (2014) | 1% (2014) |
| 165 | Forza Italia; Forward Italy | FI | | Italy | 16 December 2013 (12 years ago) | 106,000 (2015) | 0.18% (2015) |
| 166 | Reconquête; Reconquest | R! | | France | 5 December 2021 (4 years ago) | 106,000 (2022) | 0.16% (2022) |
| 167 | People's National Movement | PNM | | Trinidad and Tobago | 24 January 1956 (70 years ago) | 105,894 (2022) | 6.92% (2022) |
| 168 | Arab Socialist Ba'ath Party – Iraq Region | Ba'ath | | Iraq | 17 July 1968 (58 years ago) | 102,900 (2019) | 0.26% (2019) |
| 169 | Alliance 90/The Greens | B90/Grüne; Grüne | | Germany | 14 May 1993 (33 years ago) | 101,561 (2020) | 0.12% (2020) |
| 170 | New Democratic Party | NDP NPD | | Canada | 3 August 1961 (65 years ago) | 100,542 (2026) | 0.24% (2026) |
| 171 | Socialist Party of Serbia | SPS | | Serbia | 17 July 1990 (36 years ago) | 100,000 (2019) | 1.45% (2019) |
| 171 | Party of United Pensioners, Farmers, and Proletarians of Serbia – Solidarity and Justice | PUPS – Solidarity and Justice | | Serbia | 10 May 2005 (21 years ago) | 100,000 (2015) | 1.41% (2015) |
| 171 | New Democratic Party of Serbia | NDSS | | Serbia | 26 July 1992 (34 years ago) | 100,000 (2011) | 1.38% (2011) |
| 171 | Free Egyptians Party | FEP | | Egypt | 3 April 2011 (15 years ago) | 100,000 (2011) | 0.12% (2011) |
| 171 | Partido Demokratiko Pilipino; Philippine Democratic Party | PDP-Laban | | Philippines | 6 February 1983 (43 years ago) | 100,000 (2021) | 0.09% (2021) |

== Former political parties ==
List of former political parties by number of members
| Rank | Name | Abbreviation | Party symbol | Country | Founded | Dissolved | Claimed peak membership (year) | Approximate percentage of population (year) |
|---|---|---|---|---|---|---|---|---|
| 1 | Popular Movement of the Revolution | MPR | | Zaire | 20 May 1967 (59 years ago) | 16 May 1997 (29 years ago) | 46.5 million (1996) | 100% (1996) (Note: Every citizen was automatically a member.) |
| 2 | Communist Party of the Soviet Union | CPSU | | Soviet Union | January 1912 (114 years ago) | 6 November 1991 (35 years ago) | 19 million (1986) | 6.84% (1986) |
| 3 | National Fascist Party | PNF | | Kingdom of Italy | 9 November 1921 (105 years ago) | 27 July 1943 (83 years ago) | 10 million (1930) | 24.35% (1930) |
| 3 | Council of Indonesian Muslim Associations | Masyumi | | Indonesia | 7 November 1945 (81 years ago) | 13 September 1960 (66 years ago) | 10 million (1950) | 12.9% (1950) |
| 5 | Nazi Party | NSDAP | | Nazi Germany | 24 February 1920 (106 years ago) | 10 October 1945 (81 years ago) | 8.5 million (1945) | 12.88% (1945) |
| 6 | National Revolutionary Movement for Development | MRND | | Rwanda | 5 June 1975 (51 years ago) | 15 July 1994 (32 years ago) | 7.1 million (1990) | 100% (1990) |
| 7 | Ethiopian People's Revolutionary Democratic Front | EPRDF | | Ethiopia | 8 May 1988 (38 years ago) | 1 December 2019 (6 years ago) | 6 million (2011) | 7.23% (2011) |
| 8 | Agricultural League | RLB | | Weimar Republic | 1921 (105 years ago) | 30 January 1930 (96 years ago) | 5.6 million (1924) | 9% (1924) |
| 9 | Rastakhiz Party; Resurgence Party | | | Iran | 2 March 1975 (51 years ago) | 1 November 1978 (48 years ago) | 5 million (1976) | 14.83% (1976) |
| 10 | National Partnership | NS | | Protectorate of Bohemia and Moravia | 21 March 1939 (87 years ago) | 4 June 1945 (81 years ago) | 4 million (1939) | 55.45% (1939) |
| 10 | Concordia Association | Kyowa | | Manchukuo | July 1932 (94 years ago) | August 1945 (81 years ago) | 4 million (1943) | 10% (1943) |
| 13 | Romanian Communist Party | PCR | | Socialist Republic of Romania | 8 May 1912 (114 years ago) | 22 December 1989 (36 years ago) | 3.7 million (1989) | 15.98% (1989) |
| 14 | Polish United Workers' Party | PZPR | | Polish People's Republic | 21 December 1948 (77 years ago) | 30 January 1990 (36 years ago) | 3.5 million (1970s) | 10.72% (1970s) |
| 15 | Fatherland Front | VF | | Federal State of Austria | 20 May 1933 (93 years ago) | 13 March 1938 (88 years ago) | 3 million (1937) | 44% (1937) |
| 15 | Muslim People's Republic Party | MPRP | | Pahlavi Iran | 25 February 1979 (47 years ago) | January 1980 (46 years ago) | 3 million (1979) | 7.91% (1979) |
| 15 | Communist Party of Indonesia | PKI | | Indonesia | 23 May 1914 (112 years ago) | 5 July 1966 (60 years ago) | 3 million (1960) | 3.8% (1960) |
| 18 | Democratic Constitutional Rally | RCD | | Tunisia | 27 February 1988 (38 years ago) | 9 March 2011 (15 years ago) | 2.5 million (2010) | 23.7% (2010) |
| 18 | Islamic Republican Party | IRP | | Iran | 17 February 1979 (47 years ago) | 1 June 1987 (39 years ago) | 2.5 million (1979) | 6.59% (1979) |
| 18 | Italian Communist Party | PCI | | Italy | 15 May 1943 (83 years ago) | 2 February 1991 (35 years ago) | 2.5 million (1947) | 5.48% (1947) |
| 18 | Constitutional Democratic Party | Minseito | | Empire of Japan | 1 June 1927 (99 years ago) | 15 August 1940 (86 years ago) | 2–3 million | 3.4% (Japan Proper in 1940) |
| 22 | Socialist Unity Party of Germany | SED | | East Germany | 21 April 1946 (80 years ago) | 16 December 1989 (36 years ago) | 2.3 million (1989) | 13.76% (1989) |
| 23 | National Peasants' Party | PNȚ | | Kingdom of Romania | 26 October 1926 (100 years ago) | 29 June 1947 (79 years ago) | 2.12 million (1947) | 13.67% (1947) |
| 24 | League of Communists of Yugoslavia | SKJ | | SFR Yugoslavia | 20 April 1919 (107 years ago) | 22 January 1990 (36 years ago) | 2.1 million (1981) | 9.44% (1981) |
| 25 | Christian Democracy | DC | | Italy | 15 December 1943 (82 years ago) | 16 January 1994 (32 years ago) | 2 million (1990) | 3.53% (1990) |
| 26 | National Democratic Party | NDP | | Egypt | 2 October 1978 (48 years ago) | 16 April 2011 (15 years ago) | 1.9 million (2010) | 2.4% (2010) |
| 27 | Patriotic Union | UP | | Spain | 14 April 1924 (102 years ago) | 1930 (96 years ago) | 1.7 million | 8% |
| 28 | Dominican Party | PD | | Dominican Republic | 2 August 1931 (95 years ago) | 6 January 1962 (64 years ago) | 1.6 million (1960) | 52.7% (1960) |
| 29 | Party of Labour of Albania | PPSH | | People's Socialist Republic of Albania | 15 December 1943 (82 years ago) | 13 June 1991 (35 years ago) | 1.5 million (1989) | 47% (1989) |
| 29 | Communist Party of Czechoslovakia | KSČ | | Czechoslovak Socialist Republic | 16 May 1921 (105 years ago) | 23 April 1992 (34 years ago) | 1.5 million (1981) | 10% (1981) |
| 29 | Indonesian National Party | PNI | | Indonesia | 4 July 1927 (99 years ago) | 10 January 1973 (53 years ago) | 1.5 million (1950) | 2% (1950) |
| 32 | Personalist Labor Revolutionary Party | | | South Vietnam | 2 September 1954 (72 years ago) | 2 November 1963 (63 years ago) | 1,368,757 (1962) | 8.55% (1962) |
| 33 | Sudeten German Party | SdP | | Czechoslovakia | 1 October 1933 (93 years ago) | 5 November 1938 (88 years ago) | 1.35 million (1938) | 9% (1938) |
| 34 | German Fatherland Party | DVLP | | German Empire | 2 September 1917 (109 years ago) | 10 December 1918 (107 years ago) | 1.25 million (1918) | 1.93% (1918) |
| 35 | Arab Socialist Ba'ath Party – Syria Region | Ba'ath | | Ba'athist Syria | 7 April 1947 (79 years ago) | 29 January 2025 (21 months ago) | 1.2 million (2010) | 5.68% (2010) |
| 36 | The People of Freedom | PdL | | Italy | 27 March 2009 (17 years ago) | 16 November 2013 (13 years ago) | 1.15 million (2011) | 1.91% (2011) |
| 37 | Brazilian Integralist Action | AIB | | Brazil | 7 October 1932 (94 years ago) | 2 December 1937 (88 years ago) | 1.13 million (1937) | 2.61% (1937) |
| 38 | Democrats | DEM | | Brazil | 24 January 1985 (41 years ago) | 8 February 2022 (4 years ago) | 1.11 million (2009) | 0.58% (2009) |
| 39 | Brazilian Labour Party (1981) | DEM | | Brazil | 21 November 1979 (47 years ago) | 9 November 2023 (3 years ago) | 1,075,750 (2021) | 0.51% (2021) |
| 40 | Bulgarian Communist Party | BCP | | People's Republic of Bulgaria | 1919 (107 years ago) | 3 April 1990 (36 years ago) | 1 million (1989) | 11.1% (1989) |
| 40 | Socialist Revolutionary Party | SR | | Russian Empire | 1902 (124 years ago) | 1940 (86 years ago) | 1 million (1917) | 0.6% (1917) |

== See also ==
- Lists of political parties
- List of political ideologies
