= Shiv Prakash =

Indian politician

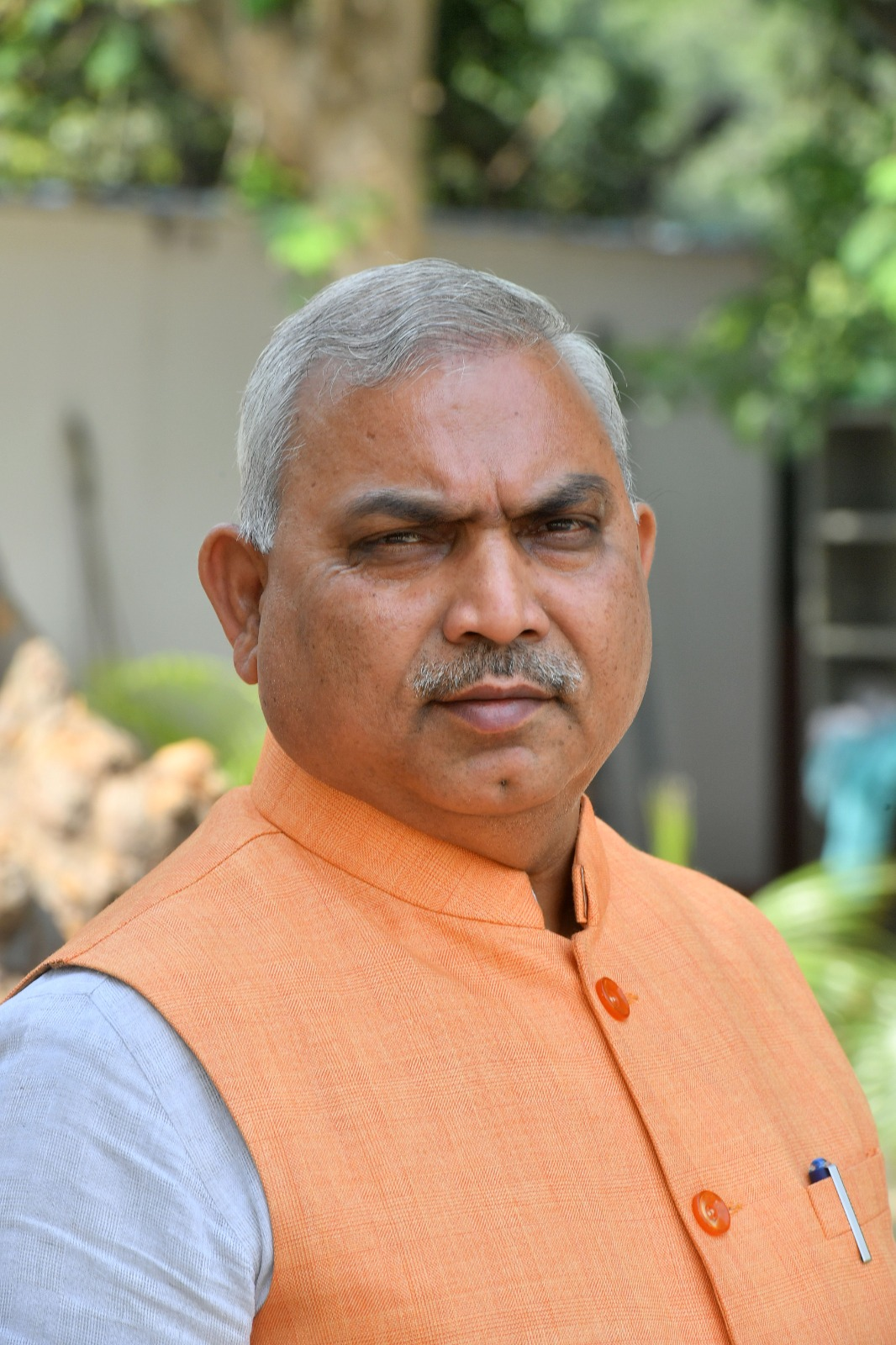

Joint National General Secretary (Organisation), Bharatiya Janata Party
- Incumbent
- Assumed office July 2014
- President: Amit Shah; J. P. Nadda

Personal details
- Born: 1 August 1967 (age 59)
- Party: Bharatiya Janata Party
- Education: Mahatma Jyotiba Phule Rohilkhand University
- Occupation: Politician
- Website: www.bjp.org/hi/national-general-secretarys

Shiv Prakash (born 1 August 1967) is an Indian politician and the current Joint National General Secretary (Organization) of the Bharatiya Janata Party. He was assigned to the party from the Rashtriya Swayamsevak Sangh in 2014.

== Early life and education ==
Shiv Prakash was born on 1 August 1967, in Birubala, a small village in Uttar Pradesh. He completed his studies at Mahatma Jyotiba Phule Rohilkhand University.

== Career ==
Shiv Prakash started his political career in 1986 as a district-level coordinator of the Rashtriya Swayamsevak Sangh. In 2008, the RSS gave him the responsibility of Western Uttar Pradesh and Uttarakhand.

In 2014, he was transferred to the BJP to take charge as joint general secretary, soon after overseeing the party's victory in Uttar Pradesh in the 2014 Lok Sabha elections. Shiv Prakash, along with former Akhil Bharatiya Vidyarthi Parishad leader Arvind Menon, started working behind the scenes to lay the foundation of the BJP in the eastern states.

In 2015, he came to West Bengal, where he worked at the booth level, learned the Bengali language, and formed party committees at 78,000 booths. The result was that the BJP won an unexpected victory in the state in the 2019 Lok Sabha election.

Currently, he is responsible for party-related development work in the states of Madhya Pradesh, Chhattisgarh, Andhra Pradesh, Telangana and West Bengal.

As of July 2023, in the most recent restructuring of the central leadership within the BJP, Shiv Prakash has been reaffirmed in his role as the Joint National General Secretary (Organization). The role of Joint National General Secretary is typically designated for members associated with the RSS. The responsibilities of those in this position encompass managing state-level party affairs, overseeing organizational matters, and serving as a crucial liaison between the BJP and the RSS, its ideological progenitor. Prakash continued to hold the position, albeit with an enhanced scope of responsibilities.

== Controversies ==
In 2016, an insider from the BJP disclosed to the media that concerns had arisen within the central leadership regarding the open conflict between Bhagat Singh Koshyari, then a potential candidate for the position of Chief Minister of Uttarakhand, and Shiv Prakash, who held the role of in-charge within the Uttarakhand BJP State Unit. The source revealed that Koshyari publicly voiced his discontent during the state executive meeting, where he critiqued Prakash for his alleged authoritative control over the state unit. This led to a verbal altercation between the two.

Preceded by V. Satish	Joint National General Secretary (Organisation) of Bhartiya Janta Party; 2014-present
