= Bharatiya Janata Party =

Political party in India

- Abbreviation: BJP
- President: Nitin Nabin
- General Secretary: List: Organisation: B. L. Santhosh; Joint General Secretary: Shiv Prakash; Saudan Singh; General Secretaries: Vinod Tawde; Sunil Bansal; Biplab Kumar Deb; Smriti Irani; Satish Poonia; Harish Dwivedi; Gajendra Patel; Sanjay Bhatia
- Presidium: National Executive
- Parliamentary Chairperson: Narendra Modi
- Rajya Sabha Leader: J. P. Nadda (Leader of the House in Rajya Sabha)
- Lok Sabha Leader: Narendra Modi (Leader of the House in Lok Sabha)
- Treasurer: Piyush Goyal
- Founder: Atal Bihari Vajpayee; Lal Krishna Advani; Murli Manohar Joshi; Nanaji Deshmukh; K. R. Malkani; Sikandar Bakht; Vijay Kumar Malhotra; Vijaya Raje Scindia; Bhairon Singh Shekhawat; Shanta Kumar; Ram Jethmalani; Jagannathrao Joshi
- Founded: 6 April 1980; 46 years ago
- Split from: Janata Party
- Preceded by: Bharatiya Jana Sangh (1951–1977); Janata Party (1977–1980)
- Headquarters: 6-A, Deen Dayal Upadhyaya Marg, New Delhi, Delhi, India
- Newspaper: Kamal Sandesh (English and Hindi); Kamal Barta (Bengali)
- Think tank: Public Policy Research Centre
- Youth wing: Bharatiya Janata Yuva Morcha
- Women's wing: BJP Mahila Morcha
- Labour wing: Bharatiya Mazdoor Sangh (unofficial)
- Peasant's wing: BJP Kisan Morcha
- Membership: ▲140,000,000
- Ideology: Conservatism (Indian); Neoliberalism; Hindutva; Hindu nationalism; Right-wing populism
- Political position: Right-wing to far-right (Note: Sources:)
- International affiliation: Asia Pacific Democracy Union (formerly)
- Colours: Saffron
- ECI status: National Party
- Alliance: National Alliance; NDA (All India); Regional Alliances; NEDA (Northeast India); Kutami (Andhra Pradesh); MDA (Meghalaya); Mahayuti (Maharashtra); AIADMK+ (Tamil Nadu); PDA (Nagaland)
- Seats in Rajya Sabha: 118 / 245
- Seats in Lok Sabha: 241 / 543
- Seats in State Legislative Councils: 174 / 426 (414 MLCs and 12 vacant; complete list)
- Seats in State Legislative Assemblies: 1,811 / 4,131 (4118 MLAs and 13 vacant; complete list)
- Number of states and union territories in government: 22 / 31 (28 States and 3 UTs)

Election symbol
- Lotus

Party flag
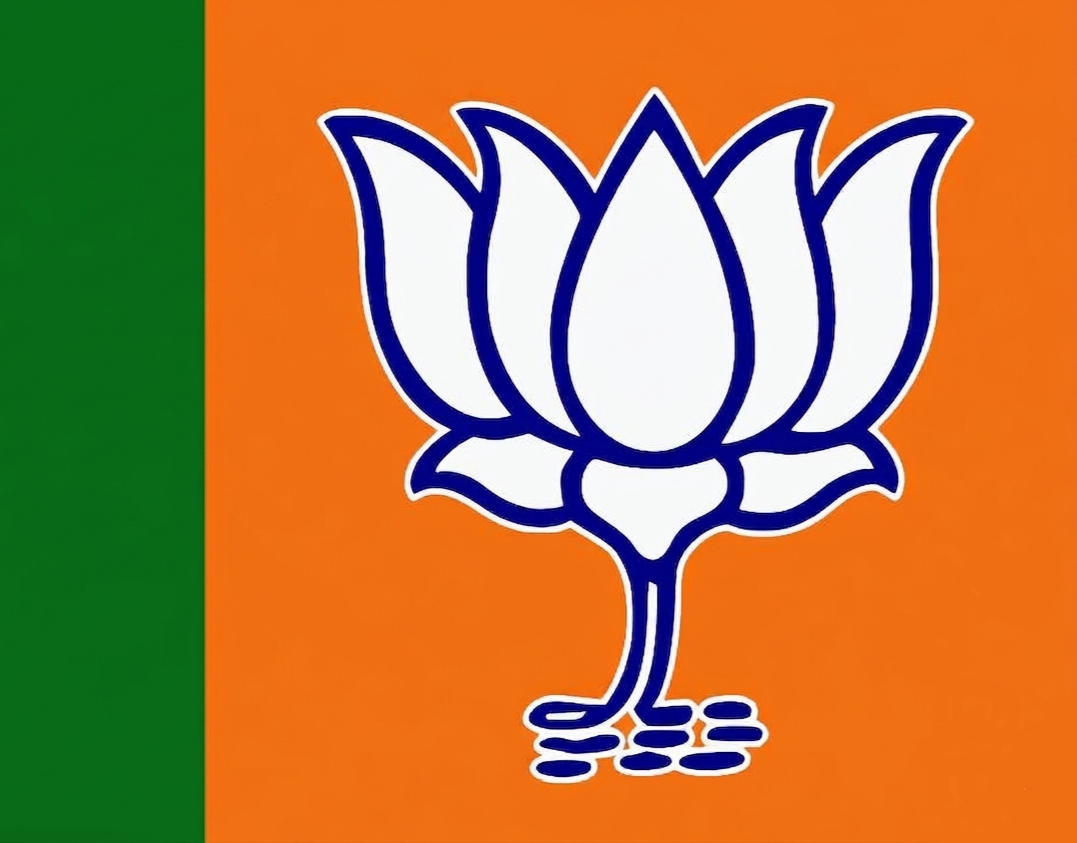

Website
- bjp.org

The Bharatiya Janata Party (Note: Hindi pronunciation: [bʱaːɾ(ə)ˈtiːjə dʒən(ə)ˈtaː ˈpaːrʈiː].) (BJP; lit. 'Indian People's Party') is a Hindu nationalist political party in India, sitting on the right-wing to far-right of the political spectrum; it is one of the two major Indian political parties alongside the Indian National Congress. Since 2014, it has been the ruling political party in India under Prime Minister Narendra Modi. The BJP follows Hindutva, a Hindu nationalist ideology; the party has organisational and ideological links to the Rashtriya Swayamsevak Sangh (RSS), a Hindutva paramilitary volunteer organisation. It is the country's biggest political party in terms of representation in the parliament as well as state legislatures while also being the largest in the world by claimed membership numbers, with having more than 140 million members as of 2025.

The party's origins lie in the Bharatiya Jana Sangh, which was founded in 1951 by Indian politician Shyama Prasad Mukherjee, after he left the Hindu Mahasabha to form a party as the political wing of the RSS. After the Emergency of 1975–1977, the Jana Sangh merged with several other political parties to form the Janata Party; it defeated the then-incumbent Indian National Congress in the 1977 general election. After three years in power, the Janata Party dissolved in 1980, with the members of the erstwhile Jana Sangh reconvening to form the modern-day BJP. Although initially unsuccessful—winning only two seats in the 1984 general election, it grew in strength on the back of the Ram Rath Yatra in Uttar Pradesh. Following victories in several state elections and better performances in national elections, the BJP became the largest political party in the Parliament in 1996; however, it lacked a majority in the lower house of Parliament, and its government, under its then-leader Atal Bihari Vajpayee, lasted for only 13 days.

After the 1998 general election, the BJP-led coalition known as the National Democratic Alliance (NDA) under prime minister Vajpayee formed a government that lasted for a year. Following fresh elections, the NDA government—again headed by Vajpayee—lasted for a full term in office; this was the first non-Congress government to do so. In the 2004 general election, the NDA suffered an unexpected defeat, and for the next ten years, the BJP was the principal opposition party. Narendra Modi, then the chief minister of Gujarat, led the party to a landslide victory in the 2014 general election. Modi has since led the NDA government as India's prime minister, including being re-elected with a sole majority in the 2019 general election and with a coalition in the 2024 general election. As of May 2026, the NDA alliance governs 20 Indian states and 2 union territories.

The official ideology of the BJP is integral humanism, first formulated by Deendayal Upadhyaya in 1965. The party advocates social conservatism and a foreign policy centred on nationalist principles. During its first period in national government, the BJP avoided its Hindutva priorities, and focused on a largely neoliberal economic policy that prioritised globalisation and economic growth over social welfare. Since returning to government in 2014, the now-ruling BJP has enacted several priorities of the RSS, including criminalising the practice of triple talaq, and revoking Article 370 of the Indian constitution (which granted autonomy to Jammu and Kashmir), abrogating its statehood. India has experienced nationwide democratic backsliding under the BJP's rule since 2014. As of 2025, the BJP has more than 140 million members, making it the largest political party by membership in the world.

== Name and symbols ==
The name as well as the symbol of the party were selected by the founders. The name "Bharatiya Janata Party" literally translates to "Indian People's Party". The symbol of the party is a lotus (Nelumbo nucifera) flower. The lotus has a cultural significance within India as well as Hinduism. The symbol has been regarded as a symbol of peace and prosperity within Hinduism. Likewise, during the independence movement of India, the symbol was used by Indian nationalists as a symbol of revolt against the British Raj. The lotus is also recognised as the national flower of India, occupying a unique position in the art and mythology of ancient India and long considered an icon of Indian culture. Thus, use of the symbol gives the party a nationalist as well as Hindutva appeal. Besides these, the party also heavily uses the saffron colour in its promotional materials and campaigning. Similar to Lotus, the Saffron colour also has a major significance within Hinduism. The most common flag used by the party is predominantly saffron with a stripe of green in the left. Within the Saffron part of the flag, the lotus symbol is also integrated. This particular colour scheme used in the flag assists the party to project itself as a secular party. Meanwhile, this also helps the party to maintain a religious undertone for its core electorate and Hindutva supporter groups.

== Precursors ==
=== Bharatiya Jana Sangh (1951–77) ===
Influential figures

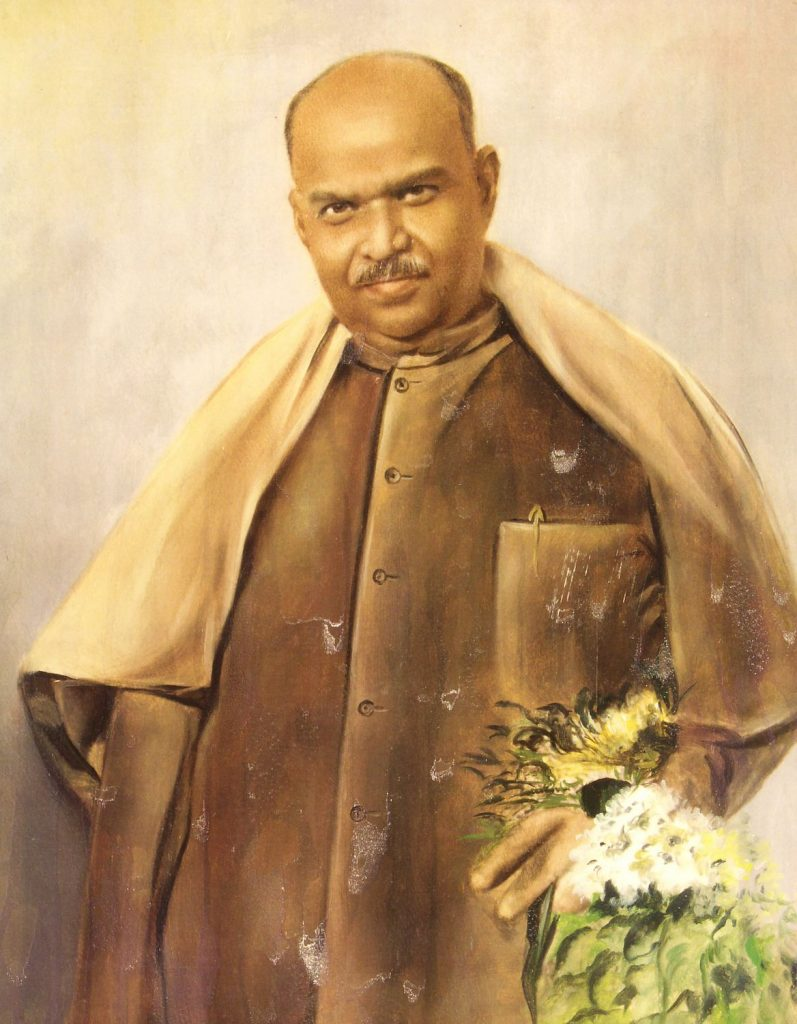
Shyama Prasad Mukherjee, founder-president of the Bharatiya Jana Sangh

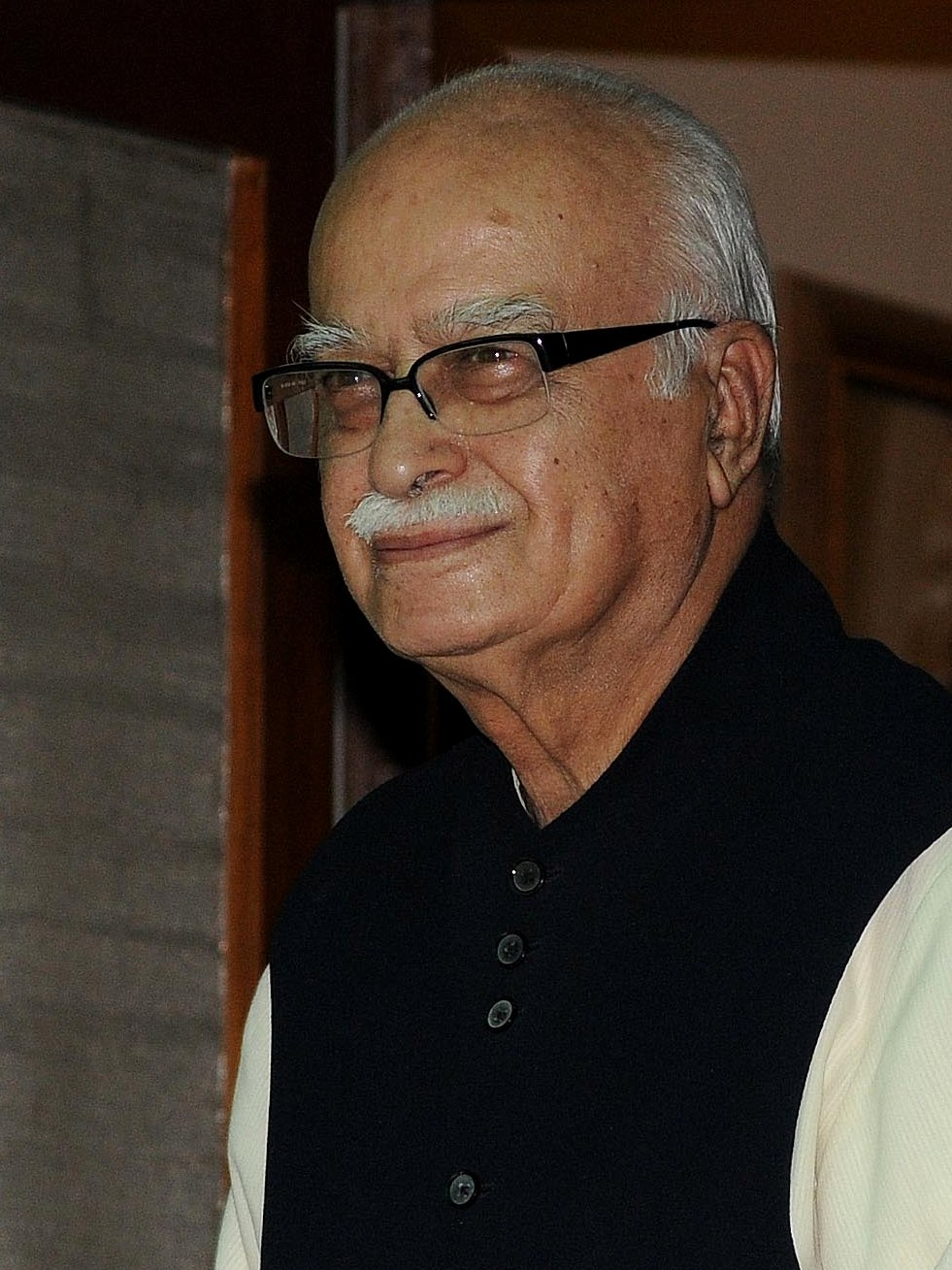
Lal Krishna Advani, the last president of the Bharatiya Jana Sangh

The BJP's origins lie in the Bharatiya Jana Sangh, popularly known as the Jana Sangh, founded by Shyama Prasad Mukherjee in 1951 in response to the politics of the dominant National Congress party. It was founded in collaboration with the Rashtriya Swayamsevak Sangh (RSS), a far-right Hindutva paramilitary organisation. The Jana Sangh was widely regarded as the political arm of the RSS. The Jana Sangh's aims included the protection of India's "Hindu" cultural identity, in addition to countering what it perceived to be the appeasement of Muslim people and the country of Pakistan by the Congress party and then-Prime Minister Jawaharlal Nehru. The RSS loaned several of its leading pracharaks, or full-time workers, to the Jana Sangh to get the new party off the ground. Prominent among these was Deendayal Upadhyaya, who was appointed General Secretary. The Jana Sangh won only three Lok Sabha seats in the first general elections in 1952. It maintained a minor presence in parliament until 1967.

The Jana Sangh's first major campaign, begun in early 1953, centred on a demand for the complete integration of Jammu and Kashmir into India. Mukherjee was arrested in May 1953 for violating orders from the state government restraining him from entering Kashmir. He died of a heart attack the following month, while still in jail. Mauli Chandra Sharma was elected to succeed Mukherjee; however, he was forced out of power by the RSS activists within the party, and the leadership went instead to Upadhyaya. Upadhyay remained the General Secretary until 1967, and worked to build a committed grassroots organisation in the image of the RSS. The party minimised engagement with the public, focusing instead on building its network of propagandists. Upadhyaya also articulated the philosophy of integral humanism, which formed the official doctrine of the party. Younger leaders, such as Atal Bihari Vajpayee and Lal Krishna Advani also became involved with the leadership in this period, with Vajpayee succeeding Upadhyaya as president in 1968. The major themes on the party's agenda during this period were legislating a uniform civil code, banning cow slaughter and abolishing the special status given to Jammu and Kashmir.

After assembly elections across the country in 1967, the party entered into a coalition with several other parties, including the Swatantra Party and the socialists. It formed governments in various states across the Hindi Belt, including Madhya Pradesh, Bihar and Uttar Pradesh. It was the first time the Jana Sangh held political office, albeit within a coalition; this caused the shelving of the Jana Sangh's more radical agenda.

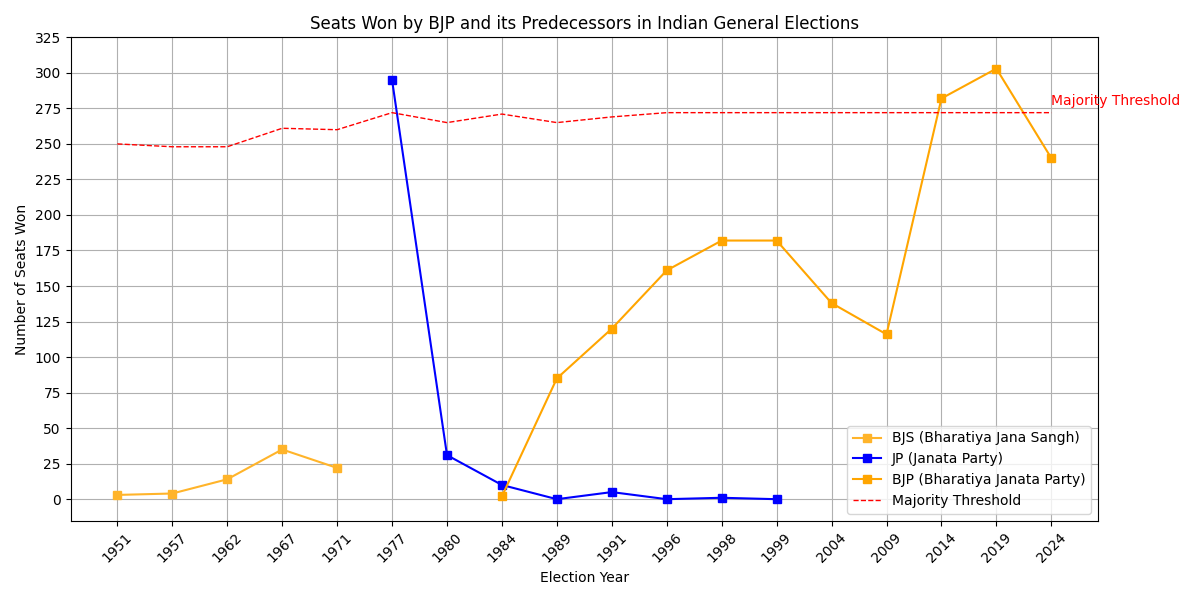
The electoral history of the BJP and its predecessors in general elections

=== Janata Party (1977–80) ===
In 1975, Prime Minister Indira Gandhi imposed a state of emergency. The Jana Sangh took part in the widespread protests, with thousands of its members being imprisoned along with other agitators across the country. In 1977, the emergency was withdrawn and general elections were held. The Jana Sangh merged with parties from across the political spectrum, including the Socialist Party, the Congress (O) and the Bharatiya Lok Dal to form the Janata Party, with its main agenda being defeating Indira Gandhi. The Janata Party won a majority in 1977 and formed a government with Morarji Desai as Prime Minister. The former Jana Sangh contributed the largest tally to the Janata Party's parliamentary contingent, with 93 seats or 31% of its strength. Vajpayee, previously the leader of the Jana Sangh, was appointed the Minister of External Affairs.

The national leadership of the former Jana Sangh consciously renounced its identity, and attempted to integrate with the political culture of the Janata Party, based on Gandhian and Hindu traditionalist principles. Political scientist Christophe Jaffrelot wrote that this proved to be impossible assimilation. The state and local levels of the Jana Sangh remained relatively unchanged, retaining a strong association with the RSS, which did not sit well with the moderate centre-right constituents of the Party. Violence between Hindus and Muslims increased sharply during the years that the Janata Party formed the government, with former Jana Sangha members being implicated in the riots in Aligarh and Jamshedpur in 1978–79. The other major constituents of the Janata Party demanded that the former Jana Sangh members should dissociate themselves from the RSS, which they refused to do. Eventually, a fragment of the Janata Party broke off to form the Janata Party (Secular). The Morarji Desai government was reduced to a minority in the Parliament, forcing Desai's resignation. Following a brief period of coalition rule, general elections were held in 1980, in which the Janata Party fared poorly, winning only 31 seats. In April 1980, shortly after the elections, the National Executive Council of the Janata Party banned its members from being 'dual members' of party and the RSS. In response, the former Jana Sangh members left to create a new political party, which is now known as the Bharatiya Janata Party.

== History ==
=== Formation and early days ===
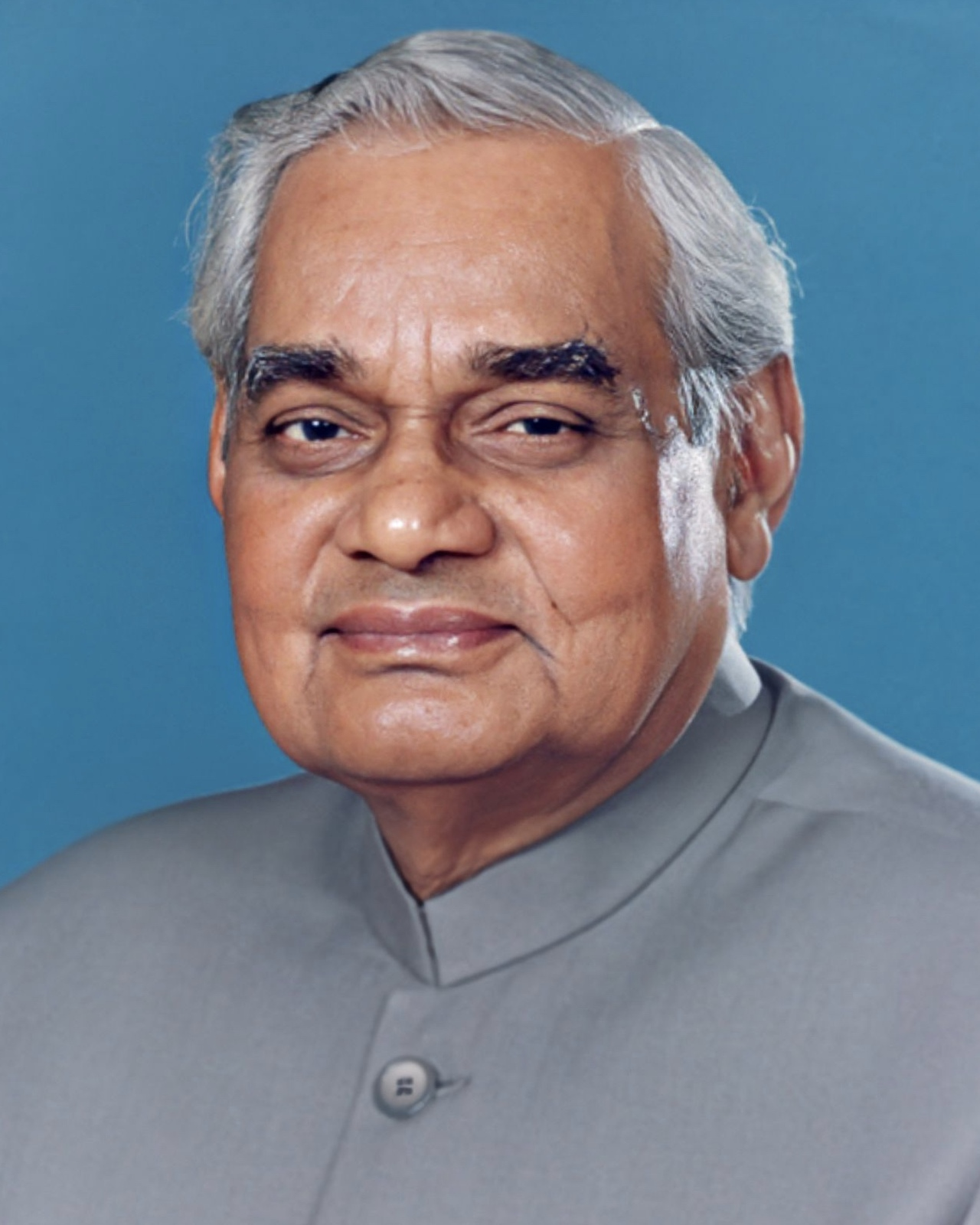
Atal Bihari Vajpayee, the founder-president of the Bharatiya Janata Party

Although the newly formed BJP was technically distinct from the Jana Sangh, the bulk of its rank and file were identical to its predecessor, with Vajpayee being its first president. Historian Ramachandra Guha writes that the early 1980s were marked by a wave of violence between Hindus and Muslims. The BJP initially moderated the Hindutva stance of its predecessor Jana Sangh to gain a wider appeal, emphasising its links to the Janata Party and the ideology of Gandhian socialism. This was unsuccessful, as it won only two Lok Sabha seats in the elections of 1984. The only two candidates of the party who won were A. K. Patel from Mehsana Lok Sabha constituency in Gujarat and C. Janga Reddy from Hanamkonda Lok Sabha constituency in Andhra Pradesh. The assassination of Indira Gandhi a few months earlier resulted in a wave of support for the Congress which won a record tally of 414 seats, contributing to the low number for the BJP.

==== Ram Janmabhoomi movement ====
Ram Rath Yatra

The failure of Vajpayee's moderate strategy led to a shift in the ideology of the party toward a policy of more hardline Hindutva. In 1984, Advani was appointed president of the party, and under him it became the political voice of the Ram Janmabhoomi movement. In the early 1980s, the Vishva Hindu Parishad (VHP) began a campaign for the construction of a temple dedicated to the Hindu deity Rama at the disputed site of the Babri Mosque in Ayodhya. The mosque had been constructed by the Mughal Emperor Babur in 1527. There is a dispute about whether a temple once stood there. The agitation was on the basis of the belief that the site is the birthplace of Rama, and that a temple had been demolished to construct the mosque. The BJP threw its support behind this campaign and made it a part of their election platform. It won 86 Lok Sabha seats in 1989, a tally which made its support crucial to the National Front government of V. P. Singh.

In September 1990, Advani began a Rath Yatra (chariot journey) to Ayodhya in support of the Ram temple movement. According to Guha, the imagery employed by the yatra was "religious, allusive, militant, masculine, and anti-Muslim". Advani was placed under preventive detention on the orders of the then Bihar chief minister Lalu Prasad Yadav. A large number of kar sevaks (religious volunteers) nonetheless converged at Ayodhya, and some attacked the mosque. Three days of fighting with the paramilitary forces ended with the deaths of several kar sevaks. Hindus were urged by VHP to "take revenge" for these deaths, resulting in riots against Muslims across Uttar Pradesh. The BJP withdrew its support from the V.P. Singh government, leading to fresh general elections. The BJP further increased its tally to 120 seats, and won a majority in the Uttar Pradesh assembly.

On 6 December 1992, the RSS and its affiliates organised a rally involving more than 100,000 VHP and BJP activists at the site of the mosque. The rally developed into a frenzied attack that ended with the demolition of the mosque. Over the following weeks, waves of violence between Hindus and Muslims erupted all over the country, killing over 2,000 people. The government briefly banned the VHP, and many BJP leaders, including Advani were arrested for making inflammatory speeches provoking the demolition. Several historians have said that the demolition was the product of a conspiracy by the Sangh Parivar, and not a spontaneous act. In the parliamentary elections in 1996, the BJP capitalised on the communal polarisation that followed the demolition to win 161 Lok Sabha seats, making it the largest party in parliament. Vajpayee was sworn in as Prime Minister but was unable to attain a majority in the Lok Sabha, forcing the government to resign after 13 days.

A 2009 report, authored by Justice Manmohan Singh Liberhan, found that 68 people were responsible for the demolition, mostly leaders from the BJP. Among those named were Vajpayee, Advani, and Murli Manohar Joshi. The report also criticised Kalyan Singh, Chief Minister of Uttar Pradesh during the demolition. He was accused of posting bureaucrats and police officers who would stay silent during the demolition. In 2020, the Supreme Court of India acquitted all of the accused in the demolition including Advani and Joshi.

Following the 2019 Supreme Court verdict, the Government of India announced a trust to construct the Mandir. On 22 January 2024, the Ram Mandir was officially opened. Prime Minister Narendra Modi led its consecration, claiming it to be the start of a new era.

=== Vajpayee and Advani era (1980–2014) ===
A coalition of regional parties formed the government in 1996, but this grouping was short-lived, and mid-term polls were held in 1998. The BJP contested the elections leading a coalition called the National Democratic Alliance (NDA), which contained its existing allies like the Samata Party, the Shiromani Akali Dal, the Shiv Sena in addition to the All India Anna Dravida Munnetra Kazhagam (AIADMK) and the Biju Janata Dal. Among these regional parties, the Shiv Sena was the only one that had an ideology similar to the BJP; Amartya Sen, for example, called the coalition an "ad hoc" grouping. The NDA had a majority with outside support from the Telugu Desam Party (TDP) and Vajpayee returned as Prime Minister. However, the coalition ruptured in May 1999 when the leader of AIADMK, J. Jayalalithaa, withdrew her support, and fresh elections were held again.

On 13 October 1999, without the AIADMK, the NDA won 303 seats in parliament and thus an outright majority. The BJP had its highest-ever tally of 183. Vajpayee became Prime Minister for the third time; Advani became Deputy Prime Minister (Note: in 2002) and Home Affairs Minister. This NDA government lasted its full term of five years. Its policy agenda included a more aggressive stance on defence and terror and neo-liberal economic policies. In 2001, Bangaru Laxman, then the BJP president, was filmed accepting a bribe in a sting operation. He was compelled to resign and was subsequently prosecuted, eventually being sentenced to four years in prison.

==== 2002 Gujarat violence ====
On 27 February 2002, a train carrying Hindu pilgrims was burned outside the town of Godhra, killing 59 people. The incident was seen as an attack upon Hindus, and sparked off massive anti-Muslim violence across the state of Gujarat that lasted several weeks. The death toll estimated was as high as 2000, while 150,000 were displaced. Rape, mutilation, and torture were also widespread. The then-Gujarat chief minister Narendra Modi and several high-ranking government officials were accused of initiating and condoning the violence, as were police officers who allegedly directed the rioters and gave them lists of Muslim-owned properties. In April 2009, a Special Investigation Team (SIT) was appointed by the Supreme Court to investigate and expedite the Gujarat riots cases. In 2012, Modi was cleared of complicity in the violence by the SIT, causing widespread anger and disbelief among the country's Muslim communities. BJP MLA Maya Kodnani, who later held a cabinet portfolio in the Modi government, was convicted of having orchestrated one of the riots and sentenced to 28 years imprisonment; she was later acquitted by the Gujarat High Court. Scholars such as Paul Brass, Martha Nussbaum and Dipankar Gupta have said that there was a high level of state complicity in the incidents.

Vajpayee called for early elections in 2004, six months ahead of schedule. The NDA's campaign was based on the slogan "India Shining", which sought to depict it as responsible for a rapid economic transformation of the country. However, the NDA unexpectedly suffered a heavy defeat, winning only 186 seats in the Lok Sabha, compared to the 222 seats of the Congress and its allies. Manmohan Singh succeeded Vajpayee as Prime Minister as the head of the United Progressive Alliance. The NDA's failure to reach out to rural Indians was provided as an explanation for its defeat, as was its divisive policy agenda.

In May 2008, the BJP won the state elections in Karnataka. This was the first time that the party won assembly elections in any South Indian state. In the 2009 general elections, its strength in the Lok Sabha was reduced to 116 seats. The election campaign would be the final for Advani as leader. The party would be led by Arun Jaitley in the Rajya Sabha and Sushma Swaraj in the Lok Sabha for the following 5 years. It lost the Karnataka assembly election in 2013.

=== Modi era (2014–present) ===
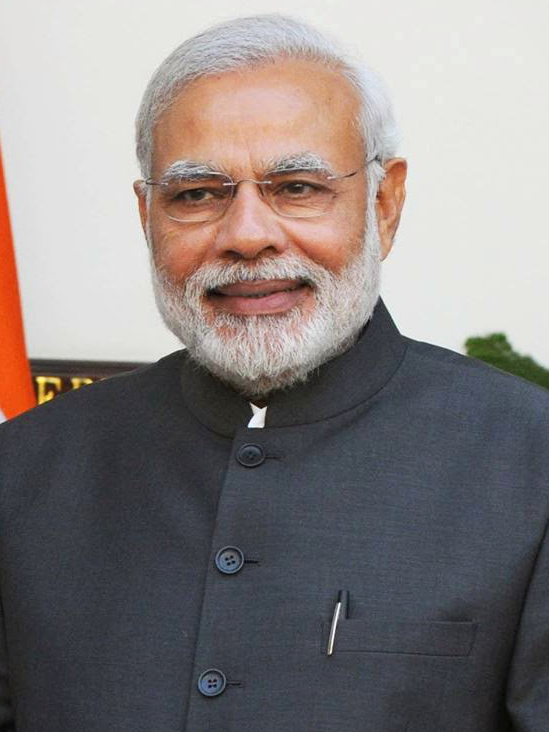
Narendra Modi, Prime Minister of India since 2014

In the 2014 Indian general election, the BJP won 282 seats, leading the NDA to a tally of 336 seats in the 543-seat Lok Sabha. Narendra Modi was sworn in as the 14th prime minister of India on 26 May 2014. The vote share of the BJP was 31% of all votes cast, a low figure relative to the number of seats it won. This was the first instance since 1984 of a single party achieving an outright majority in the Indian Parliament and the first time that it achieved a majority in the Lok Sabha on its strength. Support was concentrated in the Hindi-speaking belt in north-central India. The magnitude of the victory was not predicted by most opinion and exit polls.

Political analysts have suggested several reasons for this victory, including the popularity of Modi, and the loss of support for the Congress due to the corruption scandals in its previous term. The BJP was also able to expand its traditionally upper-caste, upper-class support base and received significant support from middle-class and Dalit people, as well as among other Backward classes. Its support among Muslims remained low; only 8% of Muslim voters voted for the BJP. The BJP was also very successful at mobilising its supporters and raising voter turnout among them.

After winning the election, the organisation of the BJP became more centralised with Modi at the helm. People loyal to Modi were rewarded leadership positions across various states within India. Amit Shah, a close confidant of Modi, was appointed as the president of the BJP in 2014. Contextually, many veteran leaders of the party like L. K. Advani, Murli Manohar Joshi, and Jaswant Singh amongst others were allegedly sidelined.

In 2016, the BJP joined the International Democracy Union, a group of various centre-right and right-wing political parties across the globe. However, as of 2024, the party is no longer a member, the secretary general of the IDU, Tina Mercep, stated that they would welcome full membership of the BJP in their global network. However, the Bharatiya Janata Yuva Morcha remains as a member of the youth wing of the IDU.

During Modi's first term as prime minister, the BJP expanded its presence in several states where it had previously been a minor player, and it regained power in other states where it had been in opposition for a considerable period. Assam, Tripura, Arunachal Pradesh, Uttar Pradesh, Bihar, Haryana, and Jammu and Kashmir saw an increase in the BJP's influence, and the party entered government in several of these states.

In 2019, the BJP won the general election with an increased majority. Soon after returning to power, on 5 August 2019, the Modi administration revoked the special status, or limited autonomy, granted under Article 370 of the Indian Constitution to Jammu and Kashmir—a region administered by India as a state. This state consists of the larger part of Kashmir which has been the subject of a dispute among India, Pakistan, and China since 1947.

Later in 2019, the Modi administration introduced the Citizenship (Amendment) Act, 2019, which was passed by the Parliament of India on 11 December 2019. It amended the Citizenship Act, 1955 by providing a path to Indian citizenship for illegal immigrants of Hindu, Sikh, Buddhist, Jain, Parsi, or Christian religion, who had fled persecution from Pakistan, Bangladesh and Afghanistan before December 2014. Muslims from those countries were not given such eligibility. The act was the first time religion had been overtly used as a criterion for citizenship under Indian law. (Note: Sharma (2019), p. 523: "First, citizenship status biased towards religious identity is by no means a new idea.... A careful study of the policies and laws related to citizenship, adopted since independence, substantiates the assertion that citizenship in India has always been based on an implicit belief that India is for Hindus.") (Note: Sen (2018), pp. 10–11: "Nehru's response [to Patel's warning] made it clear that Muslim migrants from Pakistan could not join the ranks of refugees in India... Thus, despite broad public statements promising citizenship to all displaced persons from Pakistan, Hindu migrants alone counted as citizen-refugees in post-partition India.") (Note: Jayal (2019), pp. 34–35: "While some elements of religious difference had... been covertly smuggled in earlier, this bill seeks to do so overtly.") A report by the V-Dem Institute described India as experiencing democratic backsliding due to the Modi era. Various other studies and media sources also cite India experiencing democratic backsliding. This is considered the most notable challenge to India's democracy since the authoritarian Emergency years of 1975–77.

==== Role of Amit Shah in Modi era ====
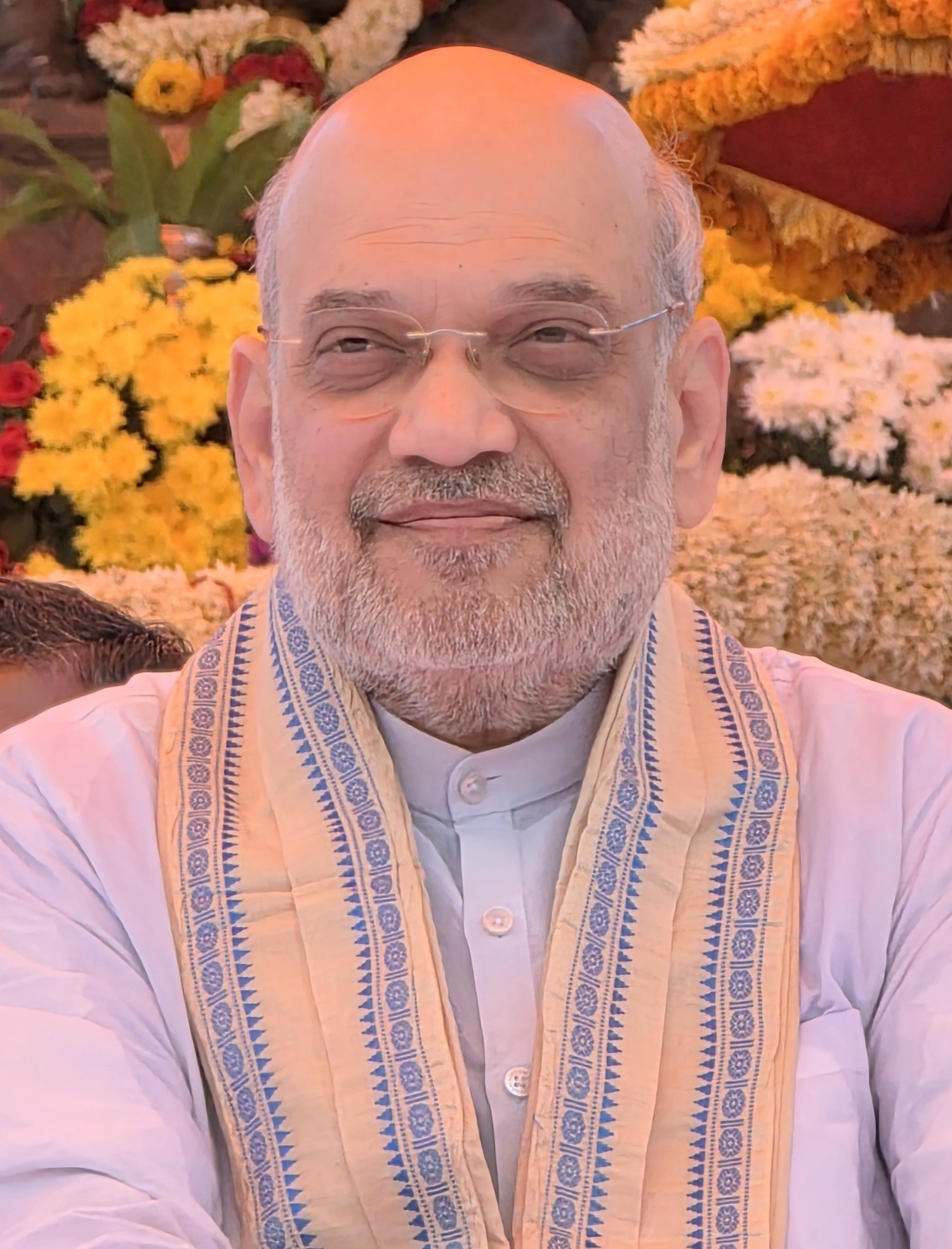
Amit Shah in 2025

Amit Shah, a close confidant of Modi, is considered the chief strategist in the BJP's electoral successes since 2014. Shah was elected as the 10th BJP president in 2014 and continued in that position until 2019, when he became the Minister of Home Affairs in the Modi cabinet. Shah spearheaded the successful BJP campaign in the crucial 2017 Uttar Pradesh state elections. As the party president, Shah led the BJP to victory in the 2019 Indian general election, becoming the most successful BJP president, as the BJP won 303 seats in the Lok Sabha, which was party's best performance till then. During the 2019 election campaign, Shah visited 312 of the 543 Lok Sabha constituencies, holding 161 public meetings and over 1,500 BJP meetings. Given his role as a strategist, Shah is often referred to as a modern-day Chanakya, since he seeks inspiration from Chanakya's principles to solve the current political problems.

== Ideology and political positions ==
The party has historically been described as right-wing, but has recently increasingly been described as far-right.

=== Social policies and Hindutva ===
The official philosophy of the BJP is "Integral humanism", first formulated by Deendayal Upadhyaya in 1965, who described it as advocating an "indigenous economic model that puts the human being at center stage." It is committed to Hindutva, an ideology articulated by Indian independence activist Vinayak Damodar Savarkar. According to the party, Hindutva is cultural nationalism favouring Indian culture over westernisation, thus it extends to all Indians regardless of religion. Scholars and political analysts describe Hindutva as seeking to redefine India and recast it as a Hindu country to the exclusion of other religions, making the BJP a Hindu nationalist party in a general sense. The BJP moderated its stance after the NDA was formed in 1998, due to the presence of parties with a broader set of ideologies.

The BJP's Hindutva ideology has been reflected in many of its government policies. It supports the construction of the Ram Mandir temple at the disputed site of the Babri Mosque. This issue was its major poll plank in the 1991 general elections. However, the demolition of the mosque during a BJP rally in 1992 resulted in backlash against it, leading to a decline of the temple's prominence in its agenda. The education policy of the NDA government reorganised the National Council of Educational Research and Training (NCERT) and tasked it with extensively revising the textbooks used in Indian schools. Various scholars have stated that this revision, especially in the case of history textbooks, was a covert attempt to "saffronise" Indian history. The NDA government introduced Hindu astrology as a subject in college curricula, despite opposition from several leading scientists.

Links between the BJP and the RSS grew stronger under the Modi administration. The RSS provided organisational support to the BJP's electoral campaigns, while the Modi administration appointed a number of individuals affiliated with the RSS to prominent government positions. In 2014, Yellapragada Sudershan Rao, who had previously been associated with the RSS, became the chairperson of the Indian Council of Historical Research (ICHR). Historians and former members of the ICHR, including those sympathetic to the BJP, questioned his credentials as a historian, and stated that the appointment was part of an agenda of cultural nationalism. Over its first term the Modi administration appointed other RSS members to lead universities and research institutions, and recruitment of faculty members favoring the RSS increased. Scholars Nandini Sundar and Kiran Bhatty write that many of these appointees did not possess the qualifications for their positions. The Modi administration also made numerous changes in government-approved history textbooks. These changes de-emphasising the role of Jawaharlal Nehru, and glorifying that of Modi himself, while also portraying Indian society as harmonious, without conflict or inequity.

The BJP supports a uniform civil code, which would apply a common set of personal laws to every citizen regardless of their personal religion, replacing the existing laws which vary by religious community. Historian Yogendra Malik writes that this ignores the differential procedures required to protect the cultural identity of the Muslim minority. The BJP favoured, and in 2019 enacted, the abrogation of Article 370 of the Constitution of India, which granted a greater degree of autonomy to Jammu and Kashmir in recognition of the unusual circumstances surrounding its accession to the Indian Union. It simultaneously abrogated Jammu and Kashmir statehood, dividing it into two separate union territories, those being Jammu and Kashmir and Ladakh.

The BJP opposes illegal immigration into India from Bangladesh. The party states that this migration, mostly in the states of Assam and West Bengal, threatens the security, economy, and stability of the country. Academics have pointed out that the BJP refers to Hindu migrants from Bangladesh as refugees, and reserves the term "illegal" for Muslim migrants. Academic Michael Gillan perceived it as an attempt to use an emotive issue to mobilise Hindu sentiment in a region where the party has not been historically successful. The party later formed the government in Assam. The Modi administration passed a citizenship law in 2019 which provided a pathway to Indian citizenship for persecuted religious minorities from Afghanistan, Bangladesh and Pakistan who are Hindus, Sikhs, Buddhists, Jains, Parsis or Christians. The law does not grant such eligibility to Muslims. This was first time religion had been overtly used as a criterion for citizenship under Indian law: it attracted global criticism, and sparked widespread protests that were halted by the COVID-19 pandemic. (Note: Jayal (2019), pp. 33–50: "While some elements of religious difference had... been covertly smuggled in earlier, this bill seeks to do so overtly.") Counter-demonstrations against the protests developed into the 2020 Delhi riots, caused chiefly by Hindu mobs attacking Muslims. Of the 53 people killed, two-thirds were Muslim.

In 2013, the Supreme Court of India reinstated the controversial Section 377 of the Indian Penal Code, which, among other things, criminalises homosexuality. There was a popular outcry, although clerics largely stated that they supported the verdict. BJP president Rajnath Singh said that the party supported Section 377, because it believed that homosexuality was unnatural, though the party softened the public stance after its victory in the 2014 general elections. The Modi government is opposed to same-sex marriage, stating in a legal affidavit that legalising it would cause "complete havoc with the delicate balance of personal laws in the country" and that it was "not comparable with Indian family unit concept of a husband, wife & children which necessarily presuppose a biological man as 'husband', a biological woman as 'wife' and children born out of union".

=== Economic policies ===
The BJP's economic policy has changed considerably since its founding. There is a significant range of economic ideologies within the party. In the 1980s, like the Jana Sangh, it reflected the thinking of the RSS and its affiliates. It supported swadeshi (the promotion of indigenous industries and products) and a protectionist export policy. However, it supported internal economic liberalisation, and opposed the state-driven industrialisation favoured by the Congress. During the 1996 elections, and later when it was in government, the BJP shifted its stance away from protectionism and towards globalisation. The tenure of the NDA saw an unprecedented influx of foreign companies in India. This was criticised, including by the BJP's affiliates, the RSS and the Swadeshi Jagran Manch: the RSS stated that the BJP was not being true to its swadeshi ideology.

The two NDA governments in the period 1998–2004 introduced significant deregulation and privatisation of government-owned enterprises. It also introduced tariff-reducing measures. These reforms built off of the initial economic liberalisation introduced by the P. V. Narasimha Rao-led Congress government in the early 1990s. India's GDP growth increased substantially during the tenure of the NDA. The 2004 campaign slogan India Shining was based on the party's belief that the free market would bring prosperity to all sectors of society. After its unexpected defeat, commentators said that it was punished for neglecting the needs of the poor and focusing too much on its corporate allies.

This shift in the economic policies of the BJP was also visible in state governments, especially in Gujarat, where the BJP held power for 16 years. Modi's government, in power from 2002 to 2014, followed a strongly neo-liberal agenda, presented as a drive towards development. Its policies have included extensive privatisation of infrastructure and services, as well as a significant rollback of labour and environmental regulations. While this was praised by the business community, commentators criticised it as catering to the BJP's upper-class constituency instead of the poor.

The economic policies of Modi's government focused on privatisation and liberalisation of the economy, based on a neoliberal framework. Modi liberalised India's foreign direct investment policies, allowing more foreign investment in several industries, including in defence and the railways. Other proposed reforms included making it harder for workers to form unions and easier for employers to hire and fire them; some of these proposals were dropped after protests. The reforms drew strong opposition from unions: on 2 September 2015, eleven of the country's largest unions went on strike, including one affiliated with the BJP. The Bharatiya Mazdoor Sangh, a constituent of the Sangh Parivar, stated that the underlying motivation of labour reforms favoured corporations over labourers. Modi has been described as taking a more economically populist approach on healthcare and agricultural policy. Modi's government has also been described as taking a more protectionist turn on international trade during his second term, withdrawing from the Regional Comprehensive Economic Partnership talks and introducing the 2020 Atmanirbhar Bharat economic plan, which emphasises national self-sufficiency.

=== Defence and counterterrorism ===
Compared to Congress, the BJP takes a more aggressive and nationalistic position on defence policy and terrorism. The Vajpayee-led NDA government carried out nuclear weapons tests and enacted the Prevention of Terrorism Act, which later came under heavy criticism. It also deployed troops to evict infiltrators from Kargil, and supported the United States' war on terror.

Although previous Congress governments developed the capability for a nuclear weapons test, the Vajpayee government broke with India's historical strategy of avoiding it and authorised Pokhran-II, a series of five nuclear tests in 1998. The tests came soon after Pakistan tested a medium-range ballistic missile. They were seen as an attempt to display India's military prowess to the world, and a reflection of anti-Pakistan sentiment within the BJP.

The Vajpayee government ordered the Indian armed forces to expel the Pakistani soldiers occupying Kashmir territory, later known as the Kargil War. Although the government was later criticised for the intelligence failures that did not detect Pakistani presence, it was successful in ousting them from the previously Indian-controlled territory.

After the terrorist attack on the Indian Parliament in December 2001, the NDA government passed the Prevention of Terrorism Act. The aim of the act was to improve the government's ability to deal with terrorism. It initially failed to pass in the Rajya Sabha; therefore, the NDA took the extraordinary step of convening a joint session of the Parliament, where the numerical superior Lok Sabha allowed the bill to pass. The act was subsequently used to prosecute hundreds of people accused of terrorism. However, it was criticised by opposition parties and scholars for being an infringement upon civil liberties, and the National Human Rights Commission of India stated that it had been used to target Muslims. It was later repealed by the Congress-led UPA government in 2004.

The Modi government has conducted several strikes on territory controlled by neighbouring countries on counterterrorism grounds. This included a 2015 Indian counter-insurgency operation in Myanmar against the National Socialist Council of Nagaland, the 2016 Indian Line of Control strike in Pakistan-administered Kashmir, and the 2019 Balakot airstrike in Pakistan. It also militarily intervened in defence of Bhutan during the 2017 Doklam standoff with China.

The Modi government considers national security to be one of their key focuses and has implemented many long-standing defence reforms. In August 2019, the Modi government established the post of the Chief of Defence Staff (CDS) to ensure better coordination between all three services, a reform that was widely requested after the 1999 Kargil War. The Department of Military Affairs was also established and put under the CDS.

=== Foreign policy ===
The historical stance of the BJP towards foreign policy, like the Bharatiya Jana Sangh, was based on aggressive Hindutva combined with economic protectionism. The Bharatiya Jana Sangh was founded with the explicit aim of reversing the partition of India; as a result, its official position was that the existence of Pakistan was illegitimate. This antagonism toward Pakistan remains a significant influence on the BJP's ideology. During the Cold War, the party and its affiliates strongly opposed India's long standing policy of non-alignment, and instead advocated closeness to the United States. In the post-Cold War era, the party has largely embraced the Indian foreign policy consensus of improving relations with the United States, while stressing a desire for a more multipolar world order.

The Vajpayee government's foreign policy in many ways represented a radical shift from BJP orthodoxy while maintaining some aspects of it. Its policy also represented a significant change from the Nehruvian idealism of previous governments, opting instead for realism. His party criticised him for adopting a much more moderate stance with Pakistan. In 1998, he made a landmark visit to Pakistan, and inaugurated the Delhi–Lahore Bus service. Vajpayee signed the Lahore Declaration, which was an attempt to improve Indo-Pakistani relations that deteriorated after the 1998 nuclear tests. However, the presence of Pakistani soldiers and militants in the disputed Kashmir territory was discovered a few months later, causing the 1999 Kargil War. The war ended a couple of months later, with the expulsion of the infiltrators two months later, without any shift in the Line of Control that marked the de facto border between the two countries. Despite the war, Vajpayee continued to display a willingness to engage Pakistan in dialogue. This was not well received among the BJP cadre, who criticised the government for being "weak". This faction of the BJP asserted itself at the post-Kargil Agra summit, preventing any significant deal from being reached.

The Vajpayee government strongly opposed the 1999 NATO bombing of Yugoslavia, with Vajpayee describing it as a "dance of destruction". The Vajpayee administration later offered political support to the U.S. war on terror, in the hope of better addressing India's issues with terrorism and insurgency in Kashmir. This led to closer defence ties with the US, including negotiations for the sale of weapons. However, the BJP strongly condemned the 2003 invasion of Iraq, stating that it "deplores the unjustified military action resorted to by the United States, Britain and their allies against Iraq". The BJP also opposed the 2011 military intervention in Libya and urged the Lok Sabha to pass a unanimous resolution condemning it.

The Modi government initially took a pragmatic stance towards Pakistan, attempting to improve relations with Nawaz Sharif's government, culminating in Modi visiting Pakistan in 2015. Relations subsequently deteriorated, particularly after Sharif was ousted in 2017. The Modi government has since been described as taking a "hardline" approach on Pakistan, and the BJP has accused the opposition Congress of collaborating with Pakistan through its criticism of government policy. In 2015, the Modi government was accused by the Nepalese government of imposing an undeclared blockade on Nepal. The Modi government expressed concern following the 2021 Myanmar coup d'état, but maintained cordial relations with the military government, abstaining from a United Nations Security Council resolution regarding the situation there. The Modi government remained neutral on the Russo-Ukrainian War, abstaining from United Nations Security Council Resolution 2623, which condemned the ongoing Russian invasion of Ukraine. The leadership of the Indian National Congress backed the government's stance.

=== Disinformation and conspiracy theories ===
The BJP has frequently spread disinformation and relied on the demonisation of Muslims. The use of fake news has been a part of the party's strategy. In September 2018, Amit Shah said at a party meeting in Rajasthan that the BJP IT cell had influenced the media during the 2017 Uttar Pradesh elections and added, "We should be capable of delivering any message to the public, whether sweet or sour, true or fake."

In April 2024, the US State Department criticised the BJP for promoting antisemitic conspiracy theories involving George Soros. In December 2024, the French newspaper Mediapart condemned the BJP for misconstruing an investigative report the paper published on the Organized Crime and Corruption Reporting Project, in its refutation of the US State Department. The paper added, "There are no facts available supporting the conspiracy theory promoted by BJP".

== Organisation and structure ==
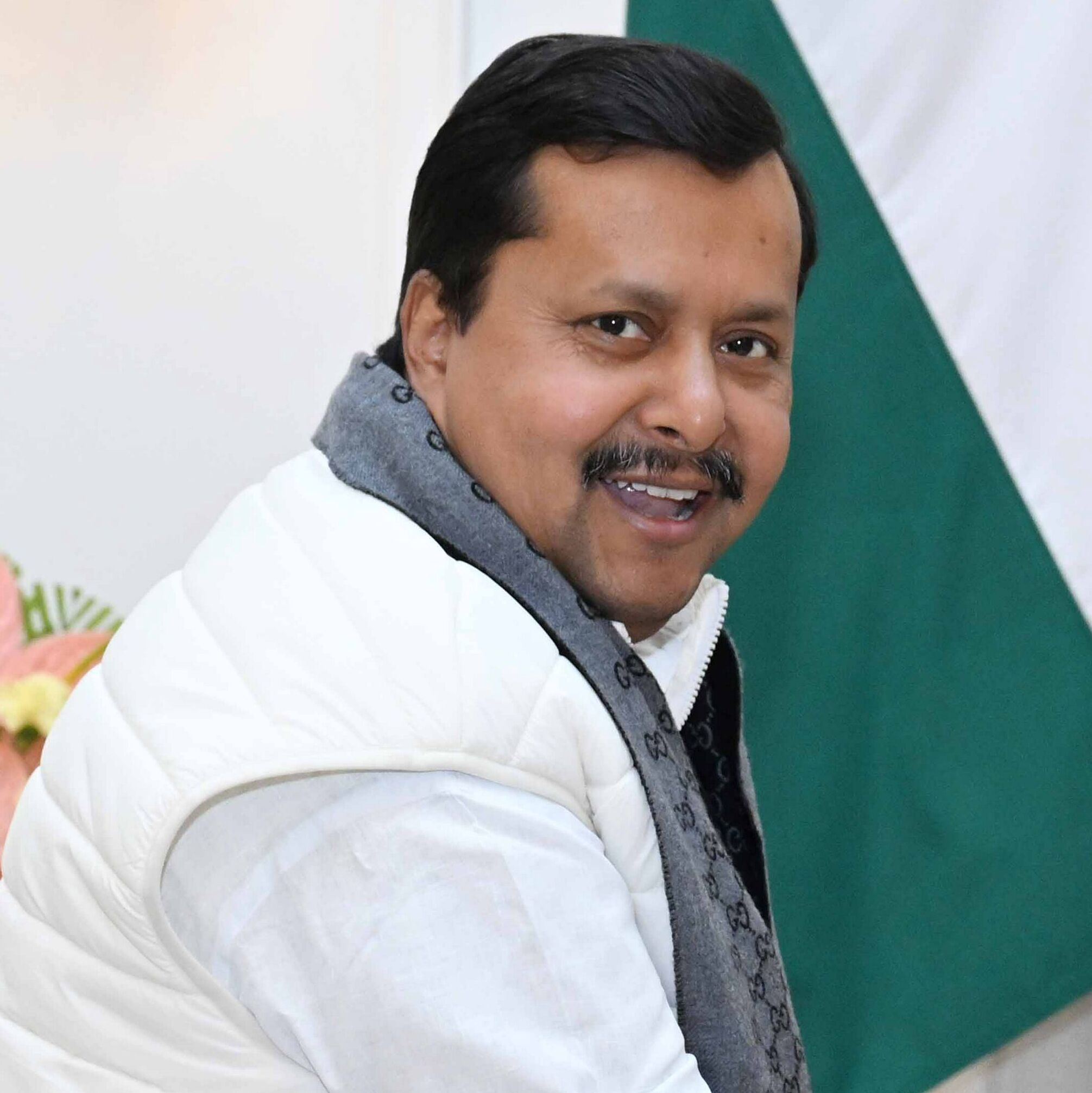
Nitin Nabin, national president of the Bharatiya Janata Party

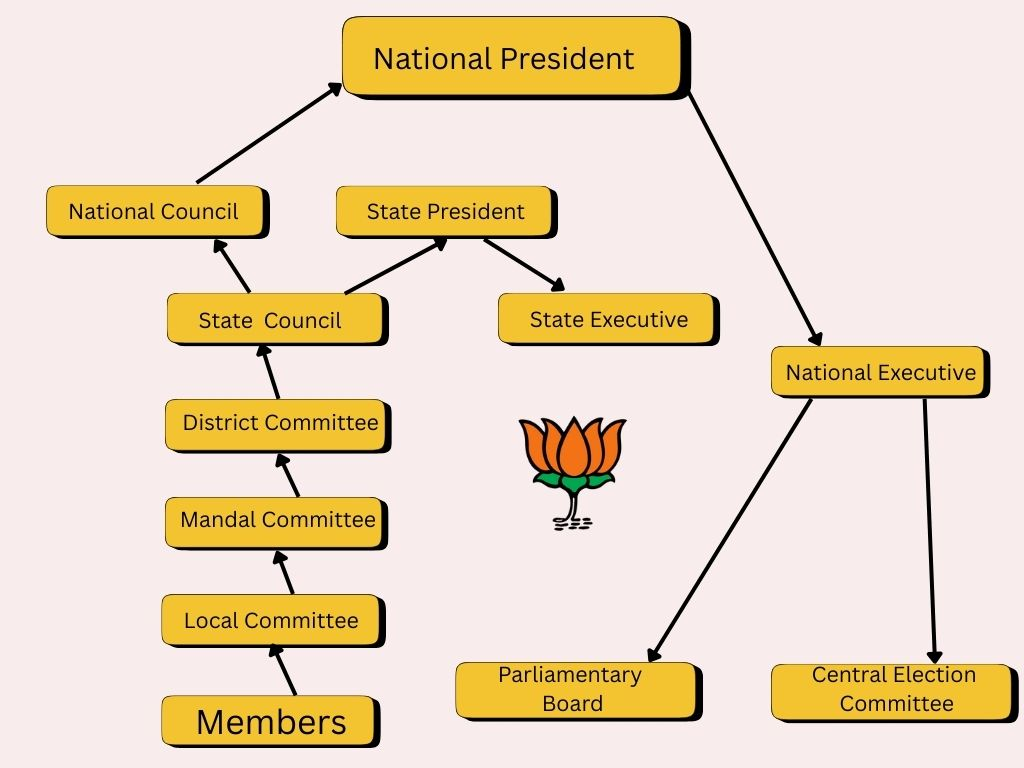
A diagram of the structure of the Bharatiya Janata Party

The organisation of the BJP is strictly hierarchical, with the president being the highest authority in the party. Until 2012, the BJP constitution mandated that any qualified member could be national or state president for a single three-year term. This was amended to a maximum of two consecutive terms.

Below the president is the National Executive, which contains a variable number of senior leaders from across the country. It is the higher decision-making body of the party. Its members are several vice-presidents, general-secretaries, treasurers and secretaries, who work directly with the president. An identical structure, with an executive committee led by a president, exists at the state, regional, district and local level.

The BJP is a cadre-based party. It has close connections with other organisations with similar ideologies, such as the RSS, ABVP, BYSS, VHP and other Sangh Parivar-related organisations. The cadres of these groups often supplement the BJP's. Its lower members are largely derived from the RSS and its affiliates, loosely known as the Sangh Parivar:

- The Akhil Bharatiya Vidyarthi Parishad (All India Students' Union), the students' wing of the RSS
- The Bharatiya Kisan Sangh (Indian Farmer's Union), the farmers' division
- The Bharatiya Mazdoor Sangh (Indian Labourers Union), the labour union associated with the RSS

The party has subsidiary organisations of its own, such as:

- The BJP Mahila Morcha (BJP Women's Front), its women's division
- The Bharatiya Janata Yuva Morcha (Indian People's Youth Front), its youth wing
- The BJP Minority Morcha (BJP Minority Front), its minority division

In terms of members, BJP claims to have over 170 million members as of October 2022, and it's considered to be among the world's largest political parties. In September 2024, PM Modi initiated the BJP membership drive, this campaign has been controversial for deceptive and coercive membership enrollment by BJP workers. In Gujarat, minor school children have been enrolled as BJP members.

== General election results ==
The Bharatiya Janata Party was officially founded in 1980, and the first general election it contested was in 1984, in which it won only two Lok Sabha seats. Following the election in 1996, the BJP became the largest party in the Lok Sabha for the first time, but the government it formed was short-lived. In the elections of 1998 and 1999, it remained the largest party, and headed the ruling coalition on both occasions. In the 2014 general election, it won an outright majority in parliament. From 1991 onwards, a BJP member has led the Opposition whenever the party was not in power. (Note: For the electoral results of the BJP's predecessors, see the JP and BJS articles.)

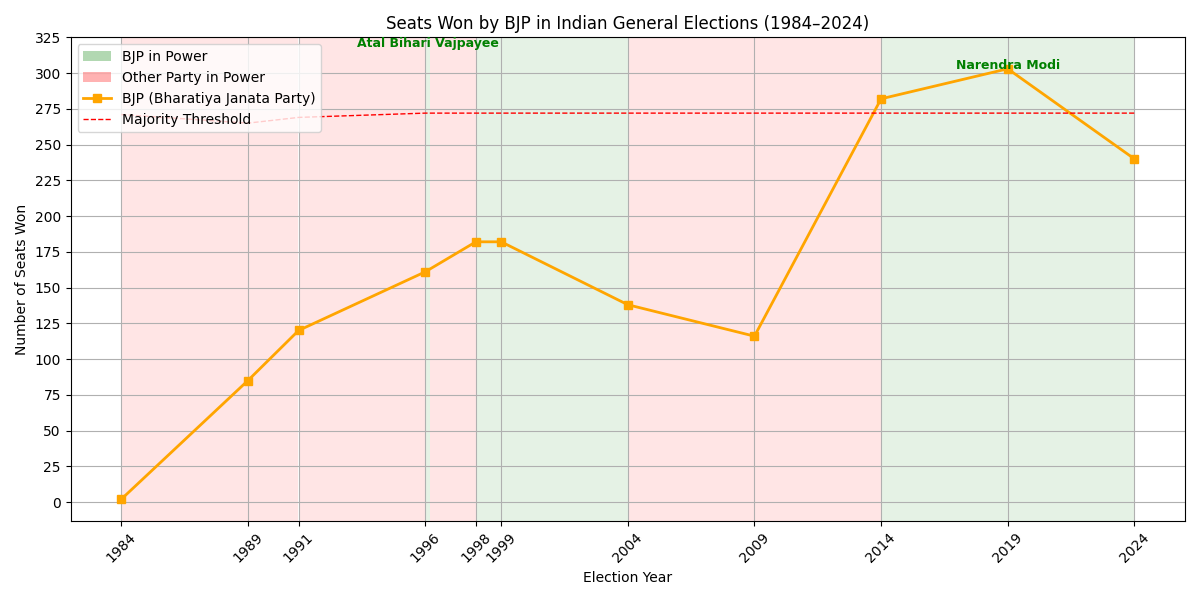
Seats Won by BJP in Indian General Elections (1984–2024)

| Year | Legislature | Party leader | Seats contested | Seats won | Change in seats | Percentage of votes | Vote swing | Outcome | Ref. |
|---|---|---|---|---|---|---|---|---|---|
| 1984 | 8th Lok Sabha | Atal Bihari Vajpayee | 229 | 2 / 543 | ▲2 | 7.74% | New | Opposition | |
| 1989 | 9th Lok Sabha | Lal Krishna Advani | 225 | 85 / 543 | ▲83 | 11.36% | ▲3.62% | Outside support for NF (1989–90) | |
| 1989 | 9th Lok Sabha | Lal Krishna Advani | 225 | 85 / 543 | ▲83 | 11.36% | ▲3.62% | Official Opposition (1990–91) | |
| 1991 | 10th Lok Sabha | Lal Krishna Advani | 477 | 120 / 543 | ▲35 | 20.11% | ▲8.75% | Official Opposition | |
| 1996 | 11th Lok Sabha | Atal Bihari Vajpayee | 471 | 161 / 543 | ▲41 | 20.29% | ▲0.18% | Coalition (1996) | |
| 1996 | 11th Lok Sabha | Atal Bihari Vajpayee | 471 | 161 / 543 | ▲41 | 20.29% | ▲0.18% | Official Opposition (1996–97) | |
| 1998 | 12th Lok Sabha | Atal Bihari Vajpayee | 388 | 182 / 543 | ▲21 | 25.59% | ▲5.30% | Coalition | |
| 1999 | 13th Lok Sabha | Atal Bihari Vajpayee | 339 | 182 / 543 | Steady | 23.75% | ▼1.84% | Coalition | |
| 2004 | 14th Lok Sabha | Lal Krishna Advani | 364 | 138 / 543 | ▼44 | 22.16% | ▼1.69% | Official Opposition | |
| 2009 | 15th Lok Sabha | Lal Krishna Advani | 433 | 116 / 543 | ▼22 | 18.80% | ▼3.36% | Official Opposition | |
| 2014 | 16th Lok Sabha | Narendra Modi | 428 | 282 / 543 | ▲166 | 31.34% | ▲12.54% | Majority | |
| 2019 | 17th Lok Sabha | Narendra Modi | 436 | 303 / 543 | ▲21 | 37.46% | ▲6.12% | Majority | |
| 2024 | 18th Lok Sabha | Narendra Modi | 441 | 240 / 543 | ▼63 | 36.56% | ▼0.8% | Coalition | |

All time-BJP Lok Sabha seat count

== Presence in states and Union Territories ==
The BJP has previously held power in Karnataka, Jharkhand and Himachal Pradesh. Also it has been the junior coalition partner in governments in Jammu and Kashmir (with the Jammu and Kashmir Peoples Democratic Party), Punjab (with the Shiromani Akali Dal), and Tamil Nadu (with the All India Anna Dravida Munnetra Kazhagam). It has never held power in Kerala and Telangana.

In addition to the NDA, the BJP is also a part of a regional political alliance in Northeast India named the North-East Democratic Alliance.

| Legislature | Seats | Legislative leader | Status |
Upper House
| Rajya Sabha | 118 / 245 | J. P. Nadda | Government |
| Andhra Pradesh | 1 / 58 | Somu Veerraju | Coalition |
| Bihar | 27 / 75 | Hari Sahni | Government |
| Karnataka | 24 / 75 | Chalavadi Narayanaswamy | Opposition |
| Maharashtra | 36 / 78 | Pravin Darekar | Government |
| Telangana | 3 / 40 | A.Venkata Narayana Reddy | Others |
| Uttar Pradesh | 79 / 100 | Keshav Prasad Maurya | Government |
Lower House
| Andhra Pradesh | 8 / 175 | Penmetsa Vishnu Kumar Raju | Coalition |
| Arunachal Pradesh | 46 / 60 | Pema Khandu | Government |
| Assam | 82 / 126 | Himanta Biswa Sarma | Government |
| Bihar | 88 / 243 | Samrat Choudhary | Government |
| Chhattisgarh | 54 / 90 | Vishnu Deo Sai | Government |
| Goa | 27 / 40 | Pramod Sawant | Government |
| Gujarat | 162 / 182 | Bhupendrabhai Patel | Government |
| Haryana | 48 / 90 | Nayab Singh Saini | Government |
| Himachal Pradesh | 28 / 68 | Jai Ram Thakur | Opposition |
| Jharkhand | 21 / 81 | Babulal Marandi | Opposition |
| Karnataka | 63 / 224 | R. Ashoka | Opposition |
| Kerala | 3 / 140 | B. B. Gopakumar | Others |
| Madhya Pradesh | 165 / 230 | Mohan Yadav | Government |
| Maharashtra | 132 / 288 | Devendra Fadnavis | Government |
| Manipur | 36 / 60 | Y. Khemchand Singh | Government |
| Meghalaya | 10 / 60 | Sanbor Shullai | Coalition |
| Mizoram | 2 / 40 | K. Beichhua | Others |
| Nagaland | 12 / 60 | Y. Patton | Coalition |
| Odisha | 79 / 147 | Mohan Charan Majhi | Government |
| Punjab | 2 / 117 | Ashwani Kumar Sharma | Others |
| Rajasthan | 118 / 200 | Bhajan Lal Sharma | Government |
| Sikkim | 0 / 32 | No Representation | Alliance |
| Tamil Nadu | 1 / 234 | M. Bhojarajan | Others |
| Telangana | 7 / 119 | Alleti Maheshwar Reddy | Others |
| Tripura | 33 / 60 | Manik Saha | Government |
| Uttar Pradesh | 257 / 403 | Yogi Adityanath | Government |
| Uttarakhand | 47 / 70 | Pushkar Singh Dhami | Government |
| West Bengal | 209 / 294 | Suvendu Adhikari | Government |
| Delhi | 48 / 70 | Rekha Gupta | Government |
| Jammu and Kashmir | 29 / 90 | Sunil Kumar Sharma | Opposition |
| Puducherry | 7 / 33 | A. Namassivayam | Coalition |

== List of heads of government ==
=== List of prime ministers ===
| No. | Portrait | Prime minister | Constituency | Term in office | | | Lok Sabha | Cabinet |
| No. | Portrait | Prime minister | Constituency | Start | End | Tenure | Lok Sabha | Cabinet |
|---|---|---|---|---|---|---|---|---|
| 1 | | Atal Bihari Vajpayee | Lucknow | 16 May 1996 | 1 June 1996 | 16 days | 11th | Vajpayee I |
| 1 | | Atal Bihari Vajpayee | Lucknow | 19 March 1998 | 13 October 1999 | 6 years, 64 days | 12th | Vajpayee II |
| 1 | | Atal Bihari Vajpayee | Lucknow | 14 October 1999 | 22 May 2004 | 6 years, 64 days | 13th | Vajpayee III |
| 2 | | Narendra Modi | Varanasi | 26 May 2014 | 30 May 2019 | 12 years, 180 days | 16th | Modi I |
| 2 | | Narendra Modi | Varanasi | 30 May 2019 | 9 June 2024 | 12 years, 180 days | 17th | Modi II |
| 2 | | Narendra Modi | Varanasi | 9 June 2024 | Incumbent | 12 years, 180 days | 18th | Modi III |

=== List of incumbent chief ministers ===
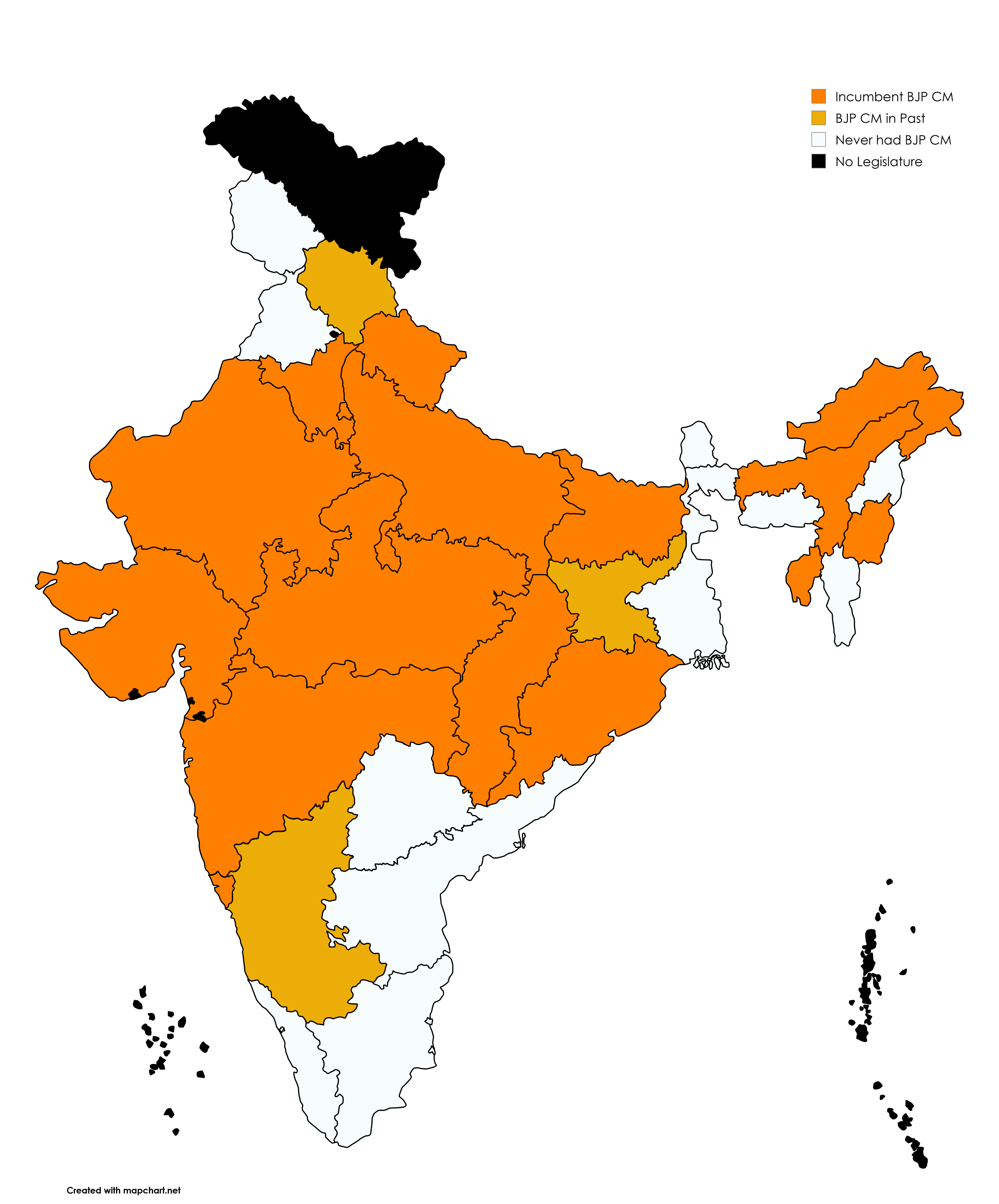

As of 22 June 2025, 58 people from Bharatiya Janata Party have held the position of a chief minister, 17 of whom are incumbent.

Incumbent Chief Ministers from the BJP
| No. | State | Portrait | Name | Cabinet | Governing coalition |
|---|---|---|---|---|---|
| 1 | Arunachal Pradesh | | Pema Khandu | Khandu V | BJP |
| 2 | Assam | | Himanta Biswa Sarma | Sarma II | BJP |
| 2 | Assam | | Himanta Biswa Sarma | Sarma II | AGP |
| 2 | Assam | | Himanta Biswa Sarma | Sarma II | BPF |
| 3 | Bihar | | Samrat Choudhary | Choudhary | BJP |
| 3 | Bihar | | Samrat Choudhary | Choudhary | JD(U) |
| 3 | Bihar | | Samrat Choudhary | Choudhary | LJP(RV) |
| 3 | Bihar | | Samrat Choudhary | Choudhary | HAM(S) |
| 3 | Bihar | | Samrat Choudhary | Choudhary | RLM |
| 4 | Chhattisgarh | | Vishnu Deo Sai | Sai | BJP |
| 5 | Delhi | | Rekha Gupta | Gupta | BJP |
| 6 | Goa | | Pramod Sawant | Sawant II | BJP |
| 6 | Goa | | Pramod Sawant | Sawant II | MGP |
| 6 | Goa | | Pramod Sawant | Sawant II | IND |
| 7 | Gujarat | | Bhupendrabhai Patel | Patel II | BJP |
| 8 | Haryana | | Nayab Singh Saini | Saini II | BJP |
| 9 | Madhya Pradesh | | Mohan Yadav | Yadav | BJP |
| 10 | Maharashtra | | Devendra Fadnavis | Fadnavis III | BJP |
| 10 | Maharashtra | | Devendra Fadnavis | Fadnavis III | SHS |
| 10 | Maharashtra | | Devendra Fadnavis | Fadnavis III | NCP |
| 10 | Maharashtra | | Devendra Fadnavis | Fadnavis III | JSS |
| 10 | Maharashtra | | Devendra Fadnavis | Fadnavis III | RSP |
| 10 | Maharashtra | | Devendra Fadnavis | Fadnavis III | RYSP |
| 10 | Maharashtra | | Devendra Fadnavis | Fadnavis III | RSVA |
| 10 | Maharashtra | | Devendra Fadnavis | Fadnavis III | IND |
| 11 | Manipur | | Yumnam Khemchand Singh | Singh | BJP |
| 11 | Manipur | | Yumnam Khemchand Singh | Singh | NPP |
| 11 | Manipur | | Yumnam Khemchand Singh | Singh | NPF |
| 11 | Manipur | | Yumnam Khemchand Singh | Singh | IND |
| 12 | Odisha | | Mohan Charan Majhi | Majhi | BJP |
| 13 | Rajasthan | | Bhajan Lal Sharma | Sharma | BJP |
| 14 | Tripura | | Manik Saha | Saha II | BJP |
| 14 | Tripura | | Manik Saha | Saha II | TMP |
| 14 | Tripura | | Manik Saha | Saha II | IPFT |
| 15 | Uttar Pradesh | | Yogi Adityanath | Adityanath II | BJP |
| 15 | Uttar Pradesh | | Yogi Adityanath | Adityanath II | AD(S) |
| 15 | Uttar Pradesh | | Yogi Adityanath | Adityanath II | RLD |
| 15 | Uttar Pradesh | | Yogi Adityanath | Adityanath II | NP |
| 16 | Uttarakhand | | Pushkar Singh Dhami | Dhami II | BJP |
| 17 | West Bengal | | Suvendu Adhikari | Adhikari | BJP |

== See also ==
- Mohammad Anwar Khan
- Leader of the Bharatiya Janata Party in the Parliament of India
- List of political parties in India
- List of national presidents of the Bharatiya Janata Party
- List of state presidents of the Bharatiya Janata Party
- Organisation of the Bharatiya Janata Party
- Politics of India
- List of ruling political parties by country
