= Third Vajpayee ministry =

Union Council of Ministers headed by Atal Bihari Vajpayee

Third Atal Bihari Vajpayee ministry
- 21st ministry of the Republic of India
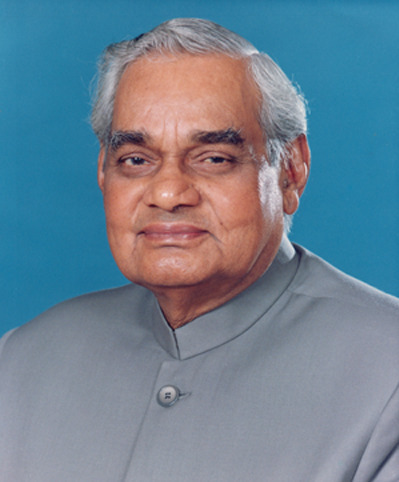
- Date formed: 13 October 1999
- Date dissolved: 22 May 2004

People and organisations
- Head of state: K. R. Narayanan (until 25 July 2002); A. P. J. Abdul Kalam (from 25 July 2002)
- Head of government: Atal Bihari Vajpayee
- Deputy head of government: L. K. Advani
- Member parties: National Democratic Alliance Bharatiya Janata Party Shiv Sena Shiromani Akali Dal Lok Janshakti Party Samata Party Biju Janata Dal Dravida Munnetra Kazagham Janata Dal (United) All India Trinamool Congress
- Status in legislature: Coalition
- Opposition party: Indian National Congress (Congress alliance)
- Opposition leader: Sonia Gandhi (in Lok Sabha) (13 October 1999 – 6 February 2004); Manmohan Singh (in Rajya Sabha) (till 21 May 2004)

History
- Election: 1999
- Outgoing election: 2004
- Legislature terms: 4 years, 222 days
- Predecessor: Second Vajpayee ministry
- Successor: First Manmohan Singh ministry

Atal Bihari Vajpayee was sworn in as Prime Minister of India for third time on 13 October 1999. Here is the list of ministers in the Third Vajpayee Ministry. During its tenure, this ministry became the largest Union Council of Ministers in India's history, comprising around 88 ministers to managing the broad-based National Democratic Alliance including over two dozen coalition partners.

The cabinet's size was later prompted the 91st Constitutional Amendment in 2003, which capped the number of ministers at 15% of the Lok Sabha strength.

== Reshuffles ==
In a reshuffle on 29 September 2000, Venkaiah Naidu and Sushma Swaraj were inducted in the ministry as cabinet ministers and Shripad Yasso Naik (Goa), Satyabrata Mookherjee (West Bengal), Kanyakumari MP P.Radhakrishnan and film star-turned-MP U V Krishnam Raju (Andhra Pradesh) as minister of state. Later that year Uma Bharti was elevated to cabinet rank.[[File:]]

In a reshuffle in 2001 Vajpayee inducted Karia Munda, Ved Prakash Goyal, Syed Shahnawaz Hussain and Tapan Sikdar as Cabinet ministers and Anna Sahib Patil, Ashok Pradhan, Ravi Shankar Prasad and Rajiv Pratap Rudy as ministers of state.

In a reshuffle in 2002 he dropped four ministers and inducted four new cabinet ministers and nine new ministers of state. New cabinet ministers were: Shatrughan Sinha, Sahib Singh Verma, Jana Krishnamurthy, Balasaheb Vikhe Patil. The new ministers of state were: Basangouda Patil, Sanjay Paswan, Shripad Yasso Naik, Vinod Khanna, Nikhil Chaudhary, S.Thirunavukarasar, Anant Geete and A. K. Moorthy .

In a reshuffle in 2003 Vajpayee inducted three new cabinet rank ministers and five ministers of state . The new cabinet ministers were :Rajnath Singh, B.C. Khanduri and Subodh Mohite. The new ministers of state were : Chinmayanand Swami (BJP), Kailash Meghwal (BJP), Nagmani (Rashtriya Janata Dal-Democratic), Prahlad Singh Patel (BJP) and P.C. Thomas (Indian Federal Democratic Party).

== Council of Ministers ==
=== Cabinet Ministers ===
Portfolio	Minister	Took office	Left office	Party	Remarks
Prime Minister and also in-charge of: Ministry of Planning; Department of Atomic Energy; Department of Space; And all other important portfolios and policy issues not allocated to any Minister.	Atal Bihari Vajpayee	13 October 1999	22 May 2004	BJP	
Deputy Prime Minister	L. K. Advani	29 June 2002	22 May 2004	BJP	
Minister of Home Affairs	L. K. Advani	13 October 1999	22 May 2004	BJP	
Minister of Personnel, Public Grievances and Pensions	Atal Bihari Vajpayee	13 October 1999	29 January 2003	BJP	Prime Minister was responsible.
Minister of Personnel, Public Grievances and Pensions	L. K. Advani	29 January 2003	22 May 2004	BJP	
Minister of External Affairs	Jaswant Singh	13 October 1999	1 July 2002	BJP	
Minister of External Affairs	Yashwant Sinha	1 July 2002	22 May 2004	BJP	
Minister of Finance	Yashwant Sinha	13 October 1999	1 July 2002	BJP	Renamed as Finance and Company Affairs.
Minister of Finance and Company Affairs	Jaswant Singh	1 July 2002	22 May 2004	BJP	
Minister of Defence	George Fernandes	13 October 1999	16 March 2001	SAP	
Minister of Defence	Atal Bihari Vajpayee	16 March 2001	18 March 2001	BJP	Prime Minister was responsible.
Minister of Defence	Jaswant Singh	18 March 2001	15 October 2001	BJP	Additional charge.
Minister of Defence	George Fernandes	15 October 2001	22 May 2004	JD(U)	
Minister of Human Resource Development; Minister of Science and Technology	Murli Manohar Joshi	13 October 1999	22 May 2004	BJP	
Minister of Ocean Development	Atal Bihari Vajpayee	13 October 1999	22 November 1999	BJP	Prime Minister was responsible.
Minister of Ocean Development	Murli Manohar Joshi	22 November 1999	22 May 2004	BJP	
Minister of Statistics and Programme Implementation	Atal Bihari Vajpayee	13 October 1999	1 September 2001	BJP	Prime Minister was responsible.
Minister of Statistics and Programme Implementation	Jagmohan	1 September 2001	18 November 2001	BJP	
Minister of Statistics and Programme Implementation	Vikram Verma	18 November 2001	1 July 2002	BJP	Minister of State (I/C) was responsible.
Minister of Statistics and Programme Implementation	Atal Bihari Vajpayee	1 July 2002	22 May 2004	BJP	Prime Minister was responsible.
Minister of Agriculture	Atal Bihari Vajpayee	13 October 1999	22 November 1999	BJP	Prime Minister was responsible.
Minister of Agriculture	Nitish Kumar	22 November 1999	3 March 2001	SAP	
Minister of Agriculture	Atal Bihari Vajpayee	3 March 2001	6 March 2001	BJP	Prime Minister was responsible.
Minister of Agriculture	Sundar Lal Patwa	6 March 2001	27 May 2001	BJP	
Minister of Agriculture	Nitish Kumar	27 May 2001	22 July 2001	SAP	
Minister of Agriculture	Ajit Singh	22 July 2001	24 May 2003	RLD	
Minister of Agriculture	Rajnath Singh	24 May 2003	22 May 2004	BJP	
Minister of Labour	Atal Bihari Vajpayee	13 October 1999	22 November 1999	BJP	Prime Minister was responsible.
Minister of Labour	Satyanarayan Jatiya	22 November 1999	1 September 2001	BJP	
Minister of Labour	Sharad Yadav	1 September 2001	1 July 2002	SAP	
Minister of Labour	Sahib Singh Verma	1 July 2002	22 May 2004	BJP	
Minister of Water Resources	Pramod Mahajan	13 October 1999	22 November 1999	BJP	
Minister of Water Resources	C. P. Thakur	22 November 1999	27 May 2000	BJP	
Minister of Water Resources	Arjun Charan Sethi	27 May 2000	22 May 2004	BJD	
Minister of Consumer Affairs and Public Distribution	Shanta Kumar	13 October 1999	17 July 2000	BJP	Renamed as Consumer Affairs, Food and Public Distribution.
Minister of Consumer Affairs, Food and Public Distribution	Shanta Kumar	17 July 2000	1 July 2002	BJP	
Minister of Consumer Affairs, Food and Public Distribution	Sharad Yadav	1 July 2002	22 May 2004	JD(U)	
Minister of Food Processing Industries	Chaman Lal Gupta	1 September 2001	1 July 2002	BJP	Minister of State (I/C) was responsible.
Minister of Food Processing Industries	N. T. Shanmugam	1 July 2002	15 January 2004	PMK	Minister of State (I/C) was responsible.
Minister of Food Processing Industries	Atal Bihari Vajpayee	15 January 2004	17 January 2004	BJP	Prime Minister was responsible.
Minister of Food Processing Industries	Rajnath Singh	17 January 2004	22 May 2004	BJP	
Minister of Health and Family Welfare	N. T. Shanmugam	13 October 1999	27 May 2000	PMK	Minister of State (I/C) was responsible.
Minister of Health and Family Welfare	C. P. Thakur	27 May 2000	1 July 2002	BJP	
Minister of Health and Family Welfare	Shatrughan Sinha	1 July 2002	29 January 2003	BJP	
Minister of Health and Family Welfare	Sushma Swaraj	29 January 2003	22 May 2004	BJP	
Minister of Railways	Mamata Banerjee	13 October 1999	16 March 2001	AITC	
Minister of Railways	Atal Bihari Vajpayee	16 March 2001	20 March 2001	BJP	Prime Minister was responsible.
Minister of Railways	Nitish Kumar	20 March 2001	22 May 2004	JD(U)	
Minister of Civil Aviation	Sharad Yadav	13 October 1999	1 September 2001	SAP	
Minister of Civil Aviation	Syed Shahnawaz Hussain	1 September 2001	24 May 2003	BJP	
Minister of Civil Aviation	Rajiv Pratap Rudy	24 May 2003	22 May 2004	BJP	Minister of State (I/C) was responsible.
Minister of Surface Transport	Nitish Kumar	13 October 1999	22 November 1999	SAP	
Minister of Surface Transport	Rajnath Singh	22 November 1999	25 October 2000	BJP	
Minister of Surface Transport	Atal Bihari Vajpayee	25 October 2000	7 November 2000	BJP	Prime Minister was responsible. Bifurcated into Ministry of Road Transport and Highways and Ministry of Shipping.
Minister of Road Transport and Highways	B. C. Khanduri	7 November 2000	24 May 2003	BJP	Minister of State (I/C) was responsible.
Minister of Road Transport and Highways	B. C. Khanduri	24 May 2003	22 May 2004	BJP	
Minister of Shipping	Arun Jaitley	7 November 2000	1 September 2001	BJP	Minister of State (I/C) was responsible.
Minister of Shipping	Ved Prakash Goyal	1 September 2001	29 January 2003	BJP	
Minister of Shipping	Shatrughan Sinha	29 January 2003	22 May 2004	BJP	
Minister of Rural Development	Sundar Lal Patwa	13 October 1999	30 September 2000	BJP	
Minister of Rural Development	M. Venkaiah Naidu	30 September 2000	1 July 2002	BJP	
Minister of Rural Development	Shanta Kumar	1 July 2002	6 April 2003	BJP	
Minister of Rural Development	Ananth Kumar	6 April 2003	24 May 2003	BJP	
Minister of Rural Development	Kashiram Rana	24 May 2003	22 May 2004	BJP	
Minister of Urban Development	Jagmohan	13 October 1999	22 November 1999	BJP	
Minister of Urban Development	Jagmohan	26 November 1999	27 May 2000	BJP	Merged with Ministry of Urban Employment and Poverty; Alleviation to form the Ministry of Urban Development and Poverty Alleviation.
Minister of Urban Employment and Poverty Alleviation	Satyanarayan Jatiya	13 October 1999	22 November 1999	BJP	
Minister of Urban Employment and Poverty Alleviation	Jagmohan	22 November 1999	26 November 1999	BJP	
Minister of Urban Employment and Poverty Alleviation	Sukhdev Singh Dhindsa	26 November 1999	27 May 2000	SAD	Merged with Ministry of Urban Development to form the Ministry of Urban Development and Poverty Alleviation.
Minister of Works and Estates	Sukhdev Singh Dhindsa	22 November 1999	26 November 1999	SAD	Merged with Ministry of Urban Development.
Minister of Urban Development and Poverty Alleviation	Jagmohan	27 May 2000	1 September 2001	BJP	
Minister of Urban Development and Poverty Alleviation	Ananth Kumar	1 September 2001	12 July 2003	BJP	
Minister of Urban Development and Poverty Alleviation	B. C. Khanduri	12 July 2003	8 September 2003	BJP	
Minister of Urban Development and Poverty Alleviation	Bandaru Dattatreya	8 September 2003	22 May 2004	BJP	Minister of State (I/C) was responsible.
Minister of Commerce and Industry	Murasoli Maran	13 October 1999	9 November 2002	DMK	
Minister of Commerce and Industry	Arun Shourie	9 July 2002	29 January 2003	BJP	
Minister of Commerce and Industry	Arun Jaitley	29 January 2003	22 May 2004	BJP	
Minister of Heavy Industries and Public Enterprises	Manohar Joshi	13 October 1999	9 May 2002	SS	
Minister of Heavy Industries and Public Enterprises	Suresh Prabhu	9 May 2002	1 July 2002	SS	
Minister of Heavy Industries and Public Enterprises	Balasaheb Vikhe Patil	1 July 2002	24 May 2003	SS	
Minister of Heavy Industries and Public Enterprises	Subodh Mohite	24 May 2003	22 May 2004	SS	
Minister of Small Scale Industries, Agro and Rural Industries	Vasundhara Raje	13 October 1999	1 September 2001	BJP	Minister of State (I/C) was responsible. Bifurcated into Ministry of Small Scale Industries and Ministry of Agro and Rural Industries.
Minister of Small Scale Industries	Vasundhara Raje	1 September 2001	29 January 2003	BJP	Minister of State (I/C) was responsible.
Minister of Small Scale Industries	C. P. Thakur	29 January 2003	22 May 2004	BJP	
Minister of Agro and Rural Industries	Kariya Munda	1 September 2001	29 January 2003	BJP	
Minister of Agro and Rural Industries	Sangh Priya Gautam	29 January 2003	22 May 2004	BJP	Minister of State (I/C) was responsible.
Minister of Textiles	Kashiram Rana	13 October 1999	24 May 2003	BJP	
Minister of Textiles	Syed Shahnawaz Hussain	24 May 2003	22 May 2004	BJP	
Minister of Petroleum and Natural Gas	Ram Naik	13 October 1999	22 May 2004	BJP	
Minister of Chemicals and Fertilizers	Suresh Prabhu	13 October 1999	30 September 2000	SS	
Minister of Chemicals and Fertilizers	Sundar Lal Patwa	30 September 2000	7 November 2000	BJP	
Minister of Chemicals and Fertilizers	Sukhdev Singh Dhindsa	7 November 2000	22 May 2004	SAD	
Minister of Mines and Minerals	Naveen Patnaik	13 October 1999	4 March 2000	BJD	
Minister of Mines and Minerals	Atal Bihari Vajpayee	4 March 2000	6 March 2000	BJP	Prime Minister was responsible.
Minister of Mines and Minerals	P. R. Kumaramangalam	6 March 2000	27 May 2000	BJP	Bifurcated into Ministry of Mines and Ministry of Coal.
Minister of Mines	Sukhdev Singh Dhindsa	27 May 2000	7 November 2000	SAD	
Minister of Mines	Sundar Lal Patwa	7 November 2000	1 September 2001	BJP	
Minister of Mines	Ram Vilas Paswan	1 September 2001	29 April 2002	LJP	
Minister of Mines	Atal Bihari Vajpayee	29 April 2002	1 July 2002	BJP	Prime Minister was responsible.
Minister of Mines	L. K. Advani	1 July 2002	26 August 2002	BJP	
Minister of Mines	Uma Bharti	26 August 2002	29 January 2003	BJP	
Minister of Mines	Ramesh Bais	29 January 2003	9 January 2004	BJP	Minister of State (I/C) was responsible.
Minister of Mines	Mamata Banerjee	9 January 2004	22 May 2004	AITC	
Minister of Coal	N. T. Shanmugam	27 May 2000	7 February 2001	PMK	Minister of State (I/C) was responsible.
Minister of Coal	Syed Shahnawaz Hussain	8 February 2001	1 September 2001	BJP	Minister of State (I/C) was responsible.
Minister of Coal	Ram Vilas Paswan	1 September 2001	29 April 2002	LJP	
Minister of Coal	Atal Bihari Vajpayee	29 April 2002	1 July 2002	BJP	Prime Minister was responsible.
Minister of Coal	L. K. Advani	1 July 2002	26 August 2002	BJP	
Minister of Coal	Uma Bharti	26 August 2002	29 January 2003	BJP	
Minister of Coal	Kariya Munda	29 January 2003	9 January 2004	BJP	
Minister of Coal	Mamata Banerjee	9 January 2004	22 May 2004	AITC	
Minister of Power	P. R. Kumaramangalam	13 October 1999	23 August 2000	BJP	Died in office.
Minister of Power	Atal Bihari Vajpayee	23 August 2000	30 September 2000	BJP	Prime Minister was responsible.
Minister of Power	Suresh Prabhu	30 September 2000	24 August 2002	SS	
Minister of Power	Atal Bihari Vajpayee	24 August 2002	26 August 2002	BJP	Prime Minister was responsible.
Minister of Power	Anant Geete	26 August 2002	22 May 2004	SS	
Minister of Non-Conventional Energy Sources	M. Kannappan	13 October 1999	30 December 2003	MDMK	Minister of State (I/C) was responsible.
Minister of Non-Conventional Energy Sources	Atal Bihari Vajpayee	30 December 2003	9 January 2004	BJP	Prime Minister was responsible.
Minister of Non-Conventional Energy Sources	Kariya Munda	9 January 2004	22 May 2004	BJP	
Minister of Parliamentary Affairs	Pramod Mahajan	13 October 1999	29 January 2003	BJP	
Minister of Parliamentary Affairs	Sushma Swaraj	29 January 2003	22 May 2004	BJP	
Minister of Law, Justice and Company Affairs	Ram Jethmalani	13 October 1999	23 July 2000	BJP	
Minister of Law, Justice and Company Affairs	Arun Jaitley	24 July 2000	1 July 2002	BJP	Minister of State (I/C) was responsible. Bifurcated into Ministry of Law and Justice and Department of Company Affairs.
Minister of Law and Justice	K. Jana Krishamurthy	1 July 2002	29 January 2003	BJP	
Minister of Law and Justice	Arun Jaitley	29 January 2003	22 May 2004	BJP	
Minister of Information and Broadcasting	Arun Jaitley	13 October 1999	30 September 2000	BJP	Minister of State (I/C) was responsible.
Minister of Information and Broadcasting	Sushma Swaraj	30 September 2000	29 January 2003	BJP	
Minister of Information and Broadcasting	Ravi Shankar Prasad	29 January 2003	22 May 2004	BJP	Minister of State (I/C) was responsible.
Minister of Communications	Ram Vilas Paswan	13 October 1999	1 September 2001	LJP	
Minister of Communications	Pramod Mahajan	22 November 1999	22 December 2001	BJP	Merged with Ministry of Information Technology to form Ministry of Communications and Information Technology.
Minister of Information Technology	Atal Bihari Vajpayee	13 October 1999	22 November 1999	BJP	Prime Minister was responsible.
Minister of Information Technology	Pramod Mahajan	22 November 1999	22 December 2001	BJP	Merged with Ministry of Communications to form Ministry of Communications and Information Technology.
Minister of Communications and Information Technology	Pramod Mahajan	22 December 2001	29 January 2003	BJP	
Minister of Communications and Information Technology	Arun Shourie	29 January 2003	22 May 2004	BJP	
Minister of Culture, Youth Affairs and Sports	Ananth Kumar	13 October 1999	2 February 2000	BJP	Bifurcated into Ministry of Youth Affairs and Sports and Ministry of Culture.
Minister of Youth Affairs and Sports	Sukhdev Singh Dhindsa	2 February 2000	7 November 2000	SAD	
Minister of Youth Affairs and Sports	Uma Bharti	7 November 2000	26 August 2002	BJP	
Minister of Youth Affairs and Sports	Vikram Verma	26 August 2002	22 May 2004	BJP	
Minister of Department of Culture	Ananth Kumar	2 February 2000	27 May 2000	BJP	Merged with Ministry of Tourism to form Ministry of Tourism and Culture.
Minister of Tourism	Uma Bharti	13 October 1999	2 February 2000	BJP	Minister of State (I/C) was responsible.
Minister of Tourism	Ananth Kumar	2 February 2000	27 May 2000	BJP	Merged with Department of Culture to form Ministry of Tourism and Culture.
Minister of Tourism and Culture	Ananth Kumar	27 May 2000	1 September 2001	BJP	Bifurcated into Ministry of Tourism and Ministry of Culture.
Minister of Culture	Maneka Gandhi	1 September 2001	18 November 2001	IND	Minister of State (I/C) was responsible. Merged with Ministry of Tourism to form Ministry of Tourism and Culture.
Minister of Tourism	Jagmohan	1 September 2001	18 November 2001	BJP	Merged with Ministry of Culture to form Ministry of Tourism and Culture.
Minister of Tourism and Culture	Jagmohan	18 November 2001	22 May 2004	BJP	
Minister of Environment and Forests	T. R. Baalu	13 October 1999	21 December 2003	DMK	
Minister of Environment and Forests	Atal Bihari Vajpayee	21 December 2003	9 January 2004	BJP	
Minister of Environment and Forests	Ramesh Bais	9 January 2004	22 May 2004	BJP	Minister of State (I/C) was responsible.
Minister of Social Justice and Empowerment	Maneka Gandhi	13 October 1999	1 September 2001	IND	Minister of State (I/C) was responsible.
Minister of Social Justice and Empowerment	Satyanarayan Jatiya	1 September 2001	22 May 2004	BJP	
Minister of Tribal Affairs	Jual Oram	13 October 1999	22 May 2004	BJP	
Minister of Disinvestment	Arun Jaitley	10 December 1999	24 July 2000	BJP	Minister of State (I/C) was responsible.
Minister of Disinvestment	Arun Shourie	24 July 2000	1 September 2001	BJP	Minister of State (I/C) was responsible.
Minister of Disinvestment	Arun Shourie	1 September 2001	22 May 2004	BJP	
Minister of Development of North Eastern Region	Arun Shourie	1 September 2001	29 January 2003	BJP	
Minister of Development of North Eastern Region	C. P. Thakur	29 January 2003	22 May 2004	BJP	
Minister without portfolio	Murasoli Maran	9 November 2002	23 November 2003	DMK	Died in office.
Minister without portfolio	Mamata Banerjee	8 September 2003	9 January 2004	AITC	

=== Ministers of State (Independent Charge) ===
Portfolio	Minister	Took office	Left office	Party
Minister of Steel (Independent Charge) of Steel	Dilip Ray	13 October 1999	27 May 2000	BJD
Minister of Steel (Independent Charge) of Steel	Braja Kishore Tripathy	27 May 2000	22 May 2004	BJD

=== Ministers of State ===
Portfolio	Minister	Took office	Left office	Party	Remarks
Minister of State in the Ministry of Home Affairs	I. D. Swami	13 October 1999	22 May 2004	BJP	
Minister of State in the Ministry of Home Affairs	C. Vidyasagar Rao	13 October 1999	29 January 2003	BJP	
Minister of State in the Ministry of Home Affairs	Harin Pathak	29 January 2003	22 May 2004	BJP	
Minister of State in the Ministry of Home Affairs	Chinmayanand Swami	24 May 2003	22 May 2004	BJP	
Minister of State in the Ministry of Finance	Balasaheb Vikhe Patil	13 October 1999	1 July 2002	SS	
Minister of State in the Ministry of Finance	V. Dhananjay Kumar	13 October 1999	30 September 2000	BJP	
Minister of State in the Ministry of Finance	Gingee N. Ramachandran	30 September 2000	1 July 2002	MDMK	Renamed as Finance and Company; Affairs.
Minister of State in the Ministry of Finance and Company Affairs	Gingee N. Ramachandran	1 July 2002	24 May 2003	MDMK	
Minister of State in the Ministry of Finance and Company Affairs	Anant Geete	1 July 2002	26 August 2002	SS	
Minister of State in the Ministry of Finance and Company Affairs	Anandrao Vithoba Adsul	26 August 2002	22 May 2004	SS	
Minister of State in the Ministry of Finance and Company Affairs	Shripad Yesso Naik	8 September 2003	22 May 2004	BJP	
Minister of State in the Ministry of External Affairs	Ajit Kumar Panja	13 October 1999	16 March 2001	AITC	
Minister of State in the Ministry of External Affairs	U. V. Krishnam Raju	30 September 2000	22 July 2001	BJP	
Minister of State in the Ministry of External Affairs	Omar Abdullah	22 July 2001	23 December 2002	JKNC	
Minister of State in the Ministry of External Affairs	Digvijay Singh	1 July 2002	22 May 2004	JD(U)	
Minister of State in the Ministry of External Affairs	Vinod Khanna	29 January 2003	22 May 2004	BJP	
Minister of State in the Ministry of Defence	Bachi Singh Rawat	13 October 1999	22 November 1999	BJP	
Minister of State in the Ministry of Defence	Harin Pathak	13 October 1999	14 November 2000	BJP	
Minister of State in the Ministry of Defence	Harin Pathak (Defence Production and Supplies)	15 November 2001	29 January 2003	BJP	
Minister of State in the Ministry of Defence	U. V. Krishnam Raju	22 July 2001	1 July 2002	BJP	
Minister of State in the Ministry of Defence	Chaman Lal Gupta	1 July 2002	22 May 2004	BJP	
Minister of State in the Ministry of Defence	O. Rajagopal	29 January 2003	22 May 2004	BJP	
Minister of State in the Ministry of Personnel, Public Grievances and Pensions	Vasundhara Raje	13 October 1999	22 November 1999	BJP	
Minister of State in the Ministry of Personnel, Public Grievances and Pensions	Arun Shourie (Administrative Reforms and Public Grievances)	22 November 1999	1 September 2001	BJP	
Minister of State in the Ministry of Personnel, Public Grievances and Pensions	Vasundhara Raje	1 September 2001	29 January 2003	BJP	
Minister of State in the Ministry of Personnel, Public Grievances and Pensions	Harin Pathak	29 January 2003	22 May 2004	BJP	
Minister of State in the Ministry of Planning	Bangaru Laxman	13 October 1999	22 November 1999	BJP	
Minister of State in the Ministry of Planning	Arun Shourie	22 November 1999	24 July 2000	BJP	
Minister of State in the Ministry of Planning	Arun Shourie	7 November 2000	1 September 2001	BJP	
Minister of State in the Ministry of Planning	Vijay Goel	1 September 2001	2 November 2001	BJP	
Minister of State in the Ministry of Planning	Vasundhara Raje	2 November 2001	29 January 2003	BJP	
Minister of State in the Ministry of Planning	Satyabrata Mookherjee	29 January 2003	22 May 2004	BJP	
Minister of State in the Prime Minister's Office	Vijay Goel	1 September 2001	29 January 2003	BJP	
Minister of State in the Department of Atomic Energy; Minister of State in the Department of Space	Vasundhara Raje	13 October 1999	29 January 2003	BJP	
Minister of State in the Department of Atomic Energy; Minister of State in the Department of Space	Satyabrata Mookherjee	29 January 2003	22 May 2004	BJP	
Minister of State in the Ministry of Statistics and Programme Implementation	Bangaru Laxman	13 October 1999	22 November 1999	BJP	
Minister of State in the Ministry of Statistics and Programme Implementation	Arun Shourie	22 November 1999	1 September 2001	BJP	
Minister of State in the Ministry of Statistics and Programme Implementation	Vijay Goel	1 July 2002	29 January 2003	BJP	
Minister of State in the Ministry of Statistics and Programme Implementation	Satyabrata Mookherjee	29 January 2003	22 May 2004	BJP	
Minister of State in the Ministry of Human Resource Development	Sumitra Mahajan	13 October 1999	1 July 2002	BJP	
Minister of State in the Ministry of Human Resource Development	Jaisingrao Gaikwad Patil	13 October 1999	27 May 2000	BJP	
Minister of State in the Ministry of Human Resource Development	Syed Shahnawaz Hussain	30 September 2000	8 February 2001	BJP	
Minister of State in the Ministry of Human Resource Development	Rita Verma	1 September 2001	29 January 2003	BJP	
Minister of State in the Ministry of Human Resource Development	Jaskaur Meena	29 January 2003	22 May 2004	BJP	
Minister of State in the Ministry of Human Resource Development	Ashok Pradhan	29 January 2003	24 May 2003	BJP	
Minister of State in the Ministry of Human Resource Development	Vallabhbhai Kathiria	30 January 2003	9 January 2004	BJP	
Minister of State in the Ministry of Human Resource Development	Sanjay Paswan	24 May 2003	22 May 2004	BJP	
Minister of State in the Ministry of Science and Technology	Santosh Kumar Gangwar	13 October 1999	22 November 1999	BJP	
Minister of State in the Ministry of Science and Technology	Bachi Singh Rawat	22 November 1999	22 May 2004	BJP	
Minister of State in the Ministry of Agriculture	S. B. P. B. K. Satyanarayana Rao	13 October 1999	29 September 2000	BJP	
Minister of State in the Ministry of Agriculture	Syed Shahnawaz Hussain (Food Processing Industries)	13 October 1999	27 May 2000	BJP	
Minister of State in the Ministry of Agriculture	Hukmdev Narayan Yadav	13 October 1999	27 May 2000	BJP	
Minister of State in the Ministry of Agriculture	Thounaojam Chaoba Singh	27 May 2000	1 September 2001	MSCP	
Minister of State in the Ministry of Agriculture	Debendra Pradhan	27 May 2000	29 January 2003	BJP	
Minister of State in the Ministry of Agriculture	Shripad Yesso Naik	30 September 2000	2 November 2001	BJP	
Minister of State in the Ministry of Agriculture	Hukmdev Narayan Yadav	2 November 2001	22 May 2004	BJP	
Minister of State in the Ministry of Labour	Muni Lall	13 October 1999	1 July 2002	BJP	
Minister of State in the Ministry of Labour	Ashok Pradhan	1 July 2002	29 January 2003	BJP	
Minister of State in the Ministry of Labour	Vijay Goel	29 January 2003	24 May 2003	BJP	
Minister of State in the Ministry of Labour	Santosh Kumar Gangwar	24 May 2003	8 September 2003	BJP	
Minister of State in the Ministry of Water Resources	Bijoya Chakravarty	13 October 1999	22 May 2004	BJP	
Minister of State in the Ministry of Consumer Affairs and Public Distribution	V. Srinivasa Prasad	13 October 1999	17 July 2000	BJP	
Minister of State in the Ministry of Consumer Affairs and Public Distribution	Sriram Chauhan	22 November 1999	17 July 2000	BJP	Renamed as Consumer Affairs and Public Distribution.
Minister of State in the Ministry of Consumer Affairs, Food and Public Distribution	V. Srinivasa Prasad	17 July 2000	6 March 2004	BJP	
Minister of State in the Ministry of Consumer Affairs, Food and Public Distribution	Sriram Chauhan	17 July 2000	1 September 2001	BJP	
Minister of State in the Ministry of Consumer Affairs, Food and Public Distribution	Ashok Pradhan	1 September 2001	1 July 2002	BJP	
Minister of State in the Ministry of Consumer Affairs, Food and Public Distribution	U. V. Krishnam Raju	1 July 2002	29 September 2003	BJP	
Minister of State in the Ministry of Consumer Affairs, Food and Public Distribution	Subhash Maharia	29 January 2003	22 May 2004	BJP	
Minister of State in the Ministry of Health and Family Welfare	Rita Verma	27 May 2000	30 September 2000	BJP	
Minister of State in the Ministry of Health and Family Welfare	A. Raja	30 September 2000	21 December 2003	DMK	
Minister of State in the Ministry of Health and Family Welfare	Vallabhbhai Kathiria	29 December 2003	30 January 2003	BJP	
Minister of State in the Ministry of Health and Family Welfare	Vallabhbhai Kathiria	9 January 2004	22 May 2004	BJP	
Minister of State in the Ministry of Railways	Digvijay Singh	13 October 1999	22 July 2001	SAP	
Minister of State in the Ministry of Railways	Bangaru Laxman	22 November 1999	31 August 2000	BJP	
Minister of State in the Ministry of Railways	O. Rajagopal	31 August 2000	1 July 2002	BJP	
Minister of State in the Ministry of Railways	Digvijay Singh	1 August 2001	1 July 2002	SAP	
Minister of State in the Ministry of Railways	A. K. Moorthy	1 July 2002	15 January 2004	PMK	
Minister of State in the Ministry of Railways	Bandaru Dattatreya	1 July 2002	8 September 2003	BJP	
Minister of State in the Ministry of Railways	Basangouda Patil Yatnal	8 September 2003	22 May 2004	BJP	
Minister of State in the Ministry of Civil Aviation	Chaman Lal Gupta	13 October 1999	1 September 2001	BJP	
Minister of State in the Ministry of Civil Aviation	Shripad Yesso Naik	1 July 2002	24 May 2003	BJP	
Minister of State in the Ministry of Surface Transport	Debendra Pradhan	13 October 1999	27 May 2000	BJP	
Minister of State in the Ministry of Surface Transport	Hukmdev Narayan Yadav	27 May 2000	2 November 2001	BJP	Bifurcated into Ministries of Road; Transport and Highways and Shipping.
Minister of State in the Ministry of Road Transport and Highways	Shripad Yesso Naik	24 May 2003	8 September 2003	BJP	
Minister of State in the Ministry of Road Transport and Highways	Pon Radhakrishnan	8 September 2003	22 May 2004	BJP	
Minister of State in the Ministry of Shipping	Hukmdev Narayan Yadav	7 November 2000	2 November 2001	BJP	
Minister of State in the Ministry of Shipping	Shripad Yesso Naik	2 November 2001	14 May 2002	BJP	
Minister of State in the Ministry of Shipping	Su. Thirunavukkarasar	1 July 2002	29 January 2003	BJP	
Minister of State in the Ministry of Shipping	Dilipkumar Gandhi	29 January 2003	15 March 2004	BJP	
Minister of State in the Ministry of Rural Development	A. Raja	13 October 1999	30 September 2001	DMK	
Minister of State in the Ministry of Rural Development	Subhash Maharia	13 October 1999	29 January 2003	BJP	
Minister of State in the Ministry of Rural Development	Rita Verma	30 September 2000	1 September 2001	BJP	
Minister of State in the Ministry of Rural Development	Annasaheb M. K. Patil	1 September 2001	22 May 2004	BJP	
Minister of State in the Ministry of Rural Development	U. V. Krishnam Raju	29 January 2003	22 May 2004	BJP	
Minister of State in the Ministry of Urban Development	Bandaru Dattatreya	13 October 1999	14 June 2000	BJP	Merged into Ministry of Urban; Development and Poverty; Alleviation.
Minister of State in the Ministry of Urban Development and Poverty Alleviation	Bandaru Dattatreya	14 June 2000	1 July 2002	BJP	
Minister of State in the Ministry of Urban Development and Poverty Alleviation	O. Rajagopal	1 July 2002	29 January 2003	BJP	
Minister of State in the Ministry of Urban Development and Poverty Alleviation	Pon Radhakrishnan	29 January 2003	8 September 2003	BJP	
Minister of State in the Ministry of Commerce and Industry	Omar Abdullah	13 October 1999	22 July 2001	JKNC	
Minister of State in the Ministry of Commerce and Industry	Raman Singh	13 October 1999	29 January 2003	BJP	
Minister of State in the Ministry of Commerce and Industry	Digvijay Singh	22 July 2001	1 September 2001	BJP	
Minister of State in the Ministry of Commerce and Industry	Rajiv Pratap Rudy	1 September 2002	24 May 2003	BJP	
Minister of State in the Ministry of Commerce and Industry	C. Vidyasagar Rao	29 January 2003	22 May 2004	BJP	
Minister of State in the Ministry of Commerce and Industry	Satyabrata Mookherjee	5 June 2003	22 May 2004	BJP	
Minister of State in the Ministry of Heavy Industries and Public Enterprises	Vallabhbhai Kathiria	13 October 1999	29 January 2003	BJP	
Minister of State in the Ministry of Heavy Industries and Public Enterprises	Santosh Kumar Gangwar	8 September 2003	22 May 2004	BJP	
Minister of State in the Ministry of Small Scale Industries	Tapan Sikdar	29 January 2003	22 May 2004	BJP	
Minister of State in the Ministry of Agro and Rural Industries	Nikhil Kumar Choudhary	1 July 2002	29 January 2003	BJP	
Minister of State in the Ministry of Textiles	Gingee N. Ramachandran	13 October 1999	30 September 2000	MDMK	
Minister of State in the Ministry of Textiles	V. Dhananjay Kumar	30 September 2000	1 July 2002	BJP	
Minister of State in the Ministry of Textiles	Basangouda Patil Yatnal	1 July 2002	8 September 2003	BJP	
Minister of State in the Ministry of Textiles	Gingee N. Ramachandran	8 September 2003	30 December 2003	MDMK	
Minister of State in the Ministry of Petroleum and Natural Gas	E. Ponnuswamy	13 October 1999	7 February 2001	PMK	
Minister of State in the Ministry of Petroleum and Natural Gas	Santosh Kumar Gangwar	22 November 1999	24 May 2003	BJP	
Minister of State in the Ministry of Petroleum and Natural Gas	Sumitra Mahajan	24 May 2003	22 May 2004	BJP	
Minister of State in the Ministry of Chemicals and Fertilizers	Ramesh Bais	13 October 1999	30 September 2000	BJP	
Minister of State in the Ministry of Chemicals and Fertilizers	Satyabrata Mookherjee	30 September 2000	1 July 2002	BJP	
Minister of State in the Ministry of Chemicals and Fertilizers	Tapan Sikdar	1 July 2002	29 January 2003	BJP	
Minister of State in the Ministry of Chemicals and Fertilizers	Chhatrapal Singh	29 January 2003	16 March 2004	BJP	
Minister of State in the Ministry of Mines and Minerals	Rita Verma	13 October 1999	30 September 2000	BJP	Bifurcated into Ministry of Mines and Ministry of Coal.
Minister of State in the Ministry of Mines	Jaisingrao Gaikwad Patil	27 May 2000	1 September 2001	BJP	
Minister of State in the Ministry of Mines	Ravi Shankar Prasad	1 September 2001	29 January 2003	BJP	
Minister of State in the Ministry of Coal	Ravi Shankar Prasad	1 September 2001	29 January 2003	BJP	
Minister of State in the Ministry of Coal	Prahlad Singh Patel	24 May 2003	22 May 2004	BJP	
Minister of State in the Ministry of Power	Jayawantiben Mehta	13 October 1999	22 May 2004	BJP	
Minister of State in the Ministry of Parliamentary Affairs	Dilip Ray	13 October 1999	22 October 1999	BJD	
Minister of State in the Ministry of Parliamentary Affairs	Faggan Singh Kulaste	13 October 1999	22 November 1999	BJP	
Minister of State in the Ministry of Parliamentary Affairs	Sriram Chauhan	13 October 1999	22 November 1999	BJP	
Minister of State in the Ministry of Parliamentary Affairs	O. Rajagopal	22 November 1999	22 May 2004	BJP	
Minister of State in the Ministry of Parliamentary Affairs	Vijay Goel	29 January 2003	24 May 2003	BJP	
Minister of State in the Ministry of Parliamentary Affairs	Bhavna Chikhalia	29 January 2003	22 May 2004	BJP	
Minister of State in the Ministry of Parliamentary Affairs	Santosh Kumar Gangwar	24 May 2003	8 September 2003	BJP	
Minister of State in the Ministry of Law, Justice and Company Affairs	O. Rajagopal	13 October 1999	24 July 2000	BJP	Bifurcated into Ministry of Law and Justice and Ministry of Company Affairs.
Minister of State in the Ministry of Law and Justice	Ravi Shankar Prasad	1 July 2002	29 January 2003	BJP	
Minister of State in the Ministry of Law and Justice	P. C. Thomas	24 May 2003	22 May 2004	KC(M)	
Minister of State in the Ministry of Information and Broadcasting	Ramesh Bais	30 September 2000	29 January 2003	BJP	
Minister of State in the Ministry of Communications	Ramesh Bais	13 October 1999	22 December 2001	BJP	Merged to form Ministry of Communications and Information; Technology.
Minister of State in the Ministry of Communications and Information; Technology	Tapan Sikdar	22 December 2001	1 July 2002	BJP	
Minister of State in the Ministry of Communications and Information; Technology	Sumitra Mahajan	1 July 2002	24 May 2003	BJP	
Minister of State in the Ministry of Communications and Information; Technology	Sanjay Paswan	1 July 2002	29 January 2003	BJP	
Minister of State in the Ministry of Communications and Information; Technology	Su. Thirunavukkarasar	24 January 2003	22 May 2004	BJP	
Minister of State in the Ministry of Communications and Information; Technology	Ashok Pradhan	24 May 2003	22 May 2004	BJP	
Minister of State in the Ministry of Culture, Youth Affairs and Sports	Thounaojam Chaoba Singh	13 October 1999	2 February 2000	BJP	Bifurcated into Ministry of Tourism and Culture, and Department of Youth Affairs and Sports.
Minister of State in the Department of Youth Affairs and Sports	Thounaojam Chaoba Singh	2 February 2000	27 May 2000	BJP	Became a ministry.
Minister of State in the Ministry of Youth Affairs and Sports	Syed Shahnawaz Hussain	27 May 2000	30 September 2000	BJP	
Minister of State in the Ministry of Youth Affairs and Sports	Pon Radhakrishnan	30 September 2000	29 January 2003	BJP	
Minister of State in the Ministry of Youth Affairs and Sports	Vijay Goel	29 January 2003	22 May 2004	BJP	
Minister of State in the Ministry of Tourism and Culture	Vinod Khanna	1 July 2002	29 January 2003	BJP	
Minister of State in the Ministry of Tourism and Culture	Bhavna Chikhalia	29 January 2003	22 May 2004	BJP	
Minister of State in the Ministry of Environment and Forests	Babulal Marandi	13 October 1999	7 November 2000	BJP	
Minister of State in the Ministry of Environment and Forests	Dilip Singh Judeo	29 January 2003	17 November 2003	BJP	
Minister of State in the Ministry of Social Justice and Empowerment	Satyabrata Mookherjee	1 July 2002	29 January 2003	BJP	
Minister of State in the Ministry of Social Justice and Empowerment	Sanjay Paswan	29 January 2003	24 May 2003	BJP	
Minister of State in the Ministry of Social Justice and Empowerment	Kailash Meghwal	24 May 2003	22 May 2004	BJP	
Minister of State in the Ministry of Social Justice and Empowerment	Nagmani	24 May 2003	22 May 2004	BJP	
Minister of State in the Ministry of Tribal Affairs	Faggan Singh Kulaste	22 November 1999	22 May 2004	BJP	
Minister of State in the Ministry of Development of North Eastern Region	Tapan Sikdar	29 January 2003	22 May 2004	BJP	

== Demographics of the Council of Ministers ==
Party	Cabinet Ministers	Ministers of State(Independent Charge)	Ministers of State	Total
Bharatiya Janata Party	30	4	21	55
Shiromani Akali Dal	1	0	0	1
Shiv Sena	4	0	0	4
Samta Party	2	0	0	2
Lok Janshakti Party	1	0	0	1
All India Trinamool Congress	1	0	1	2
Dravida Munnetra Kazhagam	3	0	1	4
Biju Janata Dal	1	2	0	3
Janata Dal (United)	1	0	0	1
