= Venkaiah Naidu =

Vice President of India from 2017 to 2022

M. Venkaiah Naidu
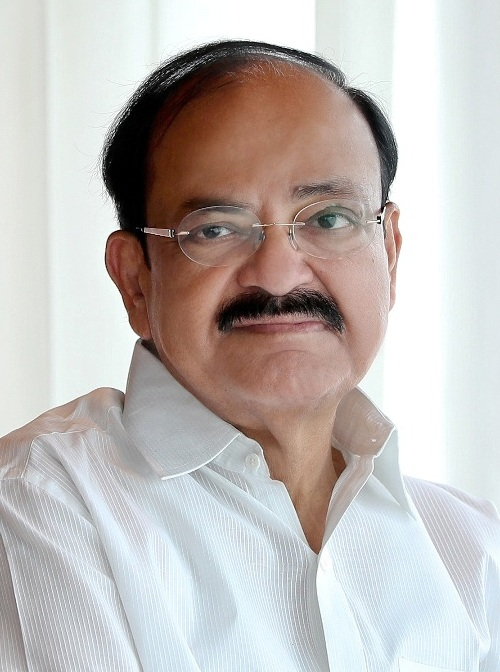
- Official portrait, 2017

Vice President of India
- In office 11 August 2017 – 11 August 2022
- President: Ram Nath Kovind; Droupadi Murmu
- Prime Minister: Narendra Modi
- Preceded by: Mohammad Hamid Ansari
- Succeeded by: Jagdeep Dhankhar

Union Minister of Housing and Urban Affairs
- In office 6 July 2017 – 17 July 2017
- Prime Minister: Narendra Modi
- Preceded by: Girija Vyas
- Succeeded by: Narendra Singh Tomar

Union Minister of Information and Broadcasting
- In office 5 July 2016 – 17 July 2017
- Prime Minister: Narendra Modi
- Preceded by: Arun Jaitley
- Succeeded by: Smriti Irani

Union Minister of Urban Development, Housing and Urban Poverty Alleviation
- In office 26 May 2014 – 6 July 2017
- Prime Minister: Narendra Modi
- Preceded by: Kamal Nath
- Succeeded by: Narendra Singh Tomar

Union Minister of Parliamentary Affairs
- In office 26 May 2014 – 5 July 2016
- Prime Minister: Narendra Modi
- Preceded by: Kamal Nath
- Succeeded by: Ananth Kumar

7th National President of Bharatiya Janata Party
- In office 1 July 2002 – 5 October 2004
- Preceded by: Jana Krishnamurthi
- Succeeded by: L. K. Advani

Union Minister for Rural Development
- In office 30 September 2000 – 30 June 2002
- Prime Minister: Atal Bihari Vajpayee
- Preceded by: Sunder Lal Patwa
- Succeeded by: Kashiram Rana

Member of Parliament, Rajya Sabha
- In office 5 July 2016 – 10 August 2017
- Preceded by: Anand Sharma
- Succeeded by: Alphons Kannanthanam
- Constituency: Rajasthan
- In office 27 March 1998 – 5 July 2016
- Preceded by: H. D. Deve Gowda
- Succeeded by: Nirmala Sitharaman
- Constituency: Karnataka

President of Bharatiya Janata Party, Andhra Pradesh
- In office 1988–1993
- National President: L. K. Advani; Murli Manohar Joshi
- Preceded by: Bangaru Laxman
- Succeeded by: V. Rama Rao

Member of Andhra Pradesh Legislative Assembly
- In office 1978–1985
- Preceded by: Ponneboyina Chenchuramaiah
- Succeeded by: Mekapati Rajamohan Reddy
- Constituency: Udayagiri

Personal details
- Born: Muppavarapu Venkaiah Naidu; 1 July 1949 (age 77) Chavatapalem, Madras Province, Dominion of India (present-day Andhra Pradesh, India)
- Party: Bharatiya Janata Party
- Spouse: Usha Naidu (m. 1970)
- Children: 2
- Education: Andhra University (LLB)
- Awards: Padma Vibhushan (2024)

Muppavarapu Venkaiah Naidu (born 1 July 1949) is an Indian politician who served as the vice president of India from 2017 to 2022. He has also served as the minister of Housing and Urban Poverty Alleviation, Urban Development and Information and Broadcasting in the Modi Cabinet.

Naidu has also served as the national president of Bharatiya Janata Party from 2002 to 2004. Earlier, he was the Union Cabinet Minister for Rural Development in the Atal Bihari Vajpayee government. He took the oath as the vice president of India and the chairman of the Rajya Sabha (ex-officio as the Vice President) on 11 August 2017. In 2024, The Government of India honoured him with Padma Vibhushan, India's second highest civilian award.

== Early life ==
Venkaiah Naidu was born on 1 July 1949 at Chavatapalem village (near Venkatachalam) in Nellore district of Andhra Pradesh, to Rangaiah Naidu and Ramanamma. He completed his schooling from Zilla Parshad High School, Bucchireddy Palem (Nellore), and pursued his bachelor's degree in politics and diplomatic studies at V. R. College, Nellore. Later, he acquired a bachelor's degree in law with specialisation in international law from Andhra University College of Law, Visakhapatnam. He was a swayamsevak in the Rashtriya Swayamsevak Sangh and joined ABVP during his college days. He was elected as the president of the students' union of colleges affiliated with the Andhra University. He came into the spotlight for his prominent role in the Jai Andhra Movement of 1972. While Kakani Venkata Ratnam led the movement from Vijayawada, Naidu took active part in the agitation in Nellore, until it was called off a year later.

In 1974, he became the convener of Jayaprakash Narayan Chhatra Sangharsh Samiti of Andhra Pradesh. He took to the streets in protest against the Emergency and was imprisoned. From 1977 to 1980, he was president of its youth wing.

== Political career ==
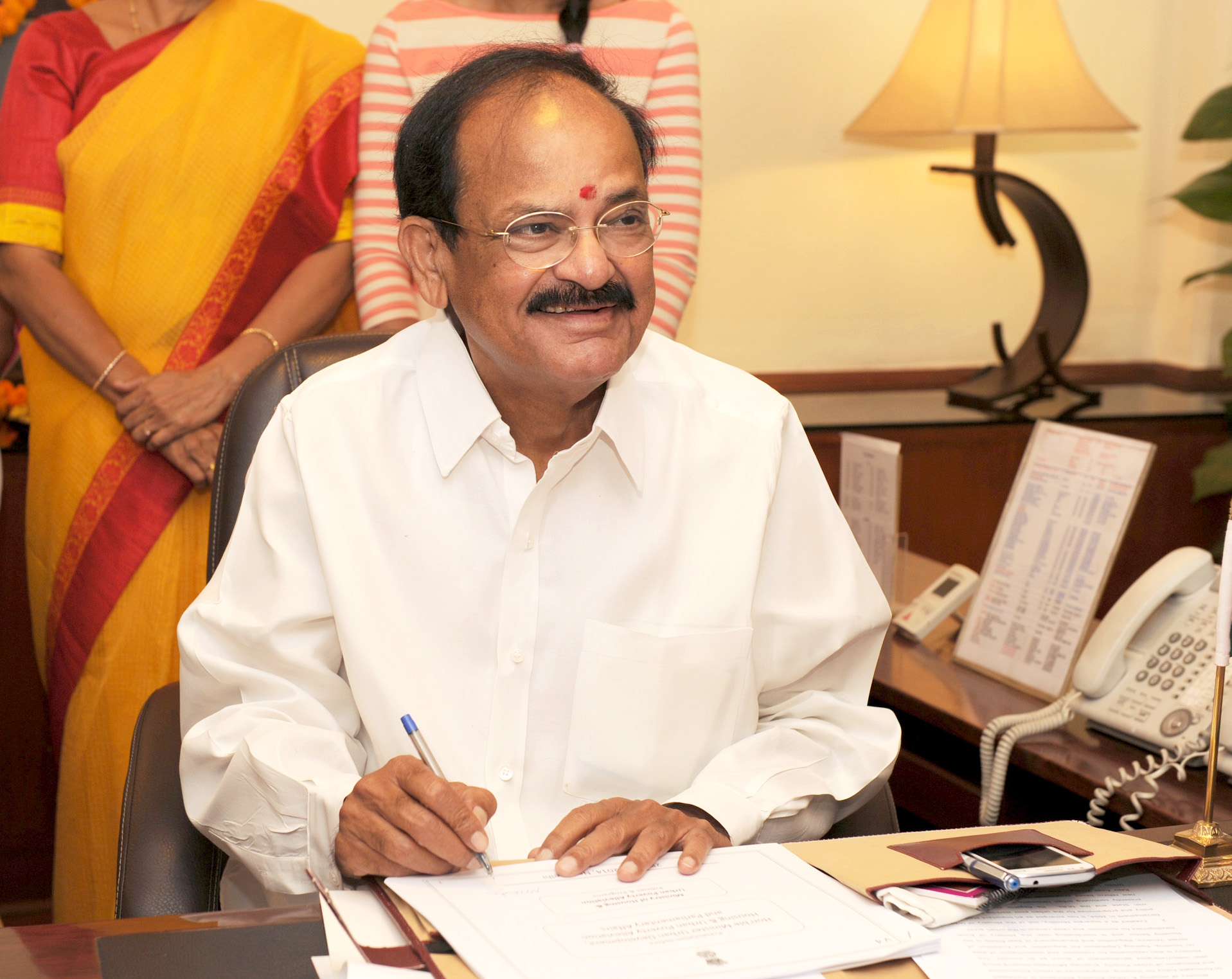
Venkaiah Naidu taking charge as the Union Minister for Urban Development in New Delhi on 28 May 2014

Both as a student leader and political figure, Naidu gained prominence as an orator who championed the cause of the farmers and the development of backward areas. His oratory skills and political activism propelled his political career, and he was elected as an MLA to the Andhra Pradesh Legislative Assembly twice from Udaygiri constituency in Nellore district in 1978 and 1983. He rose to become one of the most popular leaders of the BJP in Andhra Pradesh.

After serving in various organisational posts of the BJP at the state and national level, he was elected as a member of the Rajya Sabha from Karnataka in 1998. He was re-elected twice, in 2004 and 2010, from Karnataka. He served as the party spokesperson from 1996 to 2000, bringing to the job his panache for quirky alliterations and similes. Unlike most politicians from southern India, Naidu made an effort to master Hindi, going on to address public rallies in northern India.

After the NDA victory in the 1999 general elections, he became the Union Cabinet Minister for Rural Development in the government headed by Prime Minister Atal Bihari Vajpayee. He was known for aggressively pushing for reforms in rural development and for the many schemes introduced during this period such as the 'Pradhan Mantri Gram Sadak Yojana'.

=== National President of the BJP (2002–2004) ===
Naidu succeeded Jana Krishnamurthi as the National President of the Bharatiya Janata Party in 2003. On 28 January 2004, he was elected unopposed for a full three-year term. After the defeat of the BJP-led NDA in the 2004 general elections, he resigned from his post on 18 October 2004 and was succeeded by L. K. Advani. However, he remained at the forefront of the BJP as one of its senior vice-presidents and an important campaigner. Naidu raised the "Special Status to Andhra Pradesh" issue in Rajya Sabha (as opposition member in February 2014) and demanded special category state status to Andhra Pradesh. The Prime Minister agreed to it, though it was not included in the Andhra Pradesh Reorganisation Act.

=== First Modi ministry (2014–2017) ===
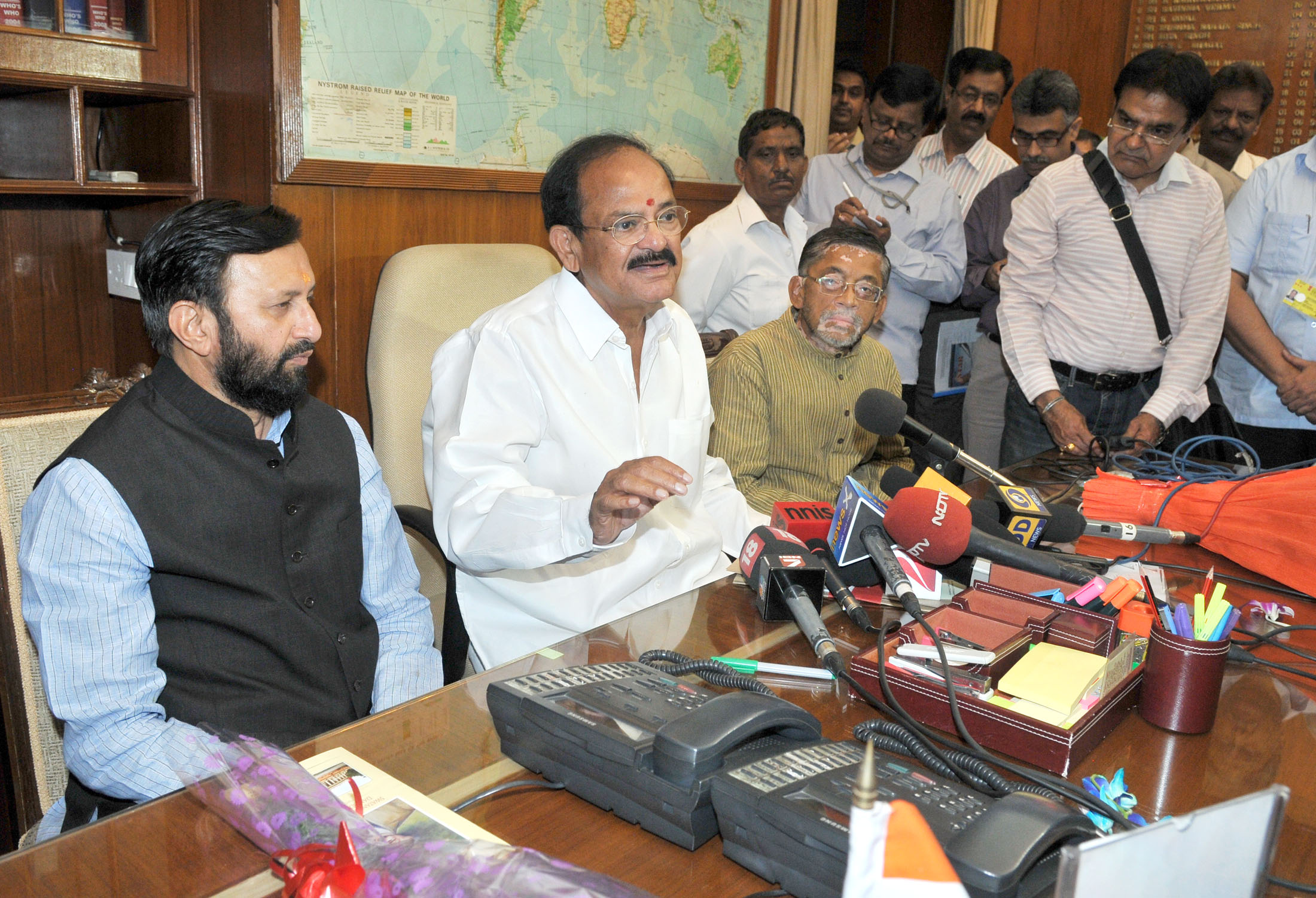
Venkaiah Naidu taking charge as the Union Minister for Parliamentary Affairs in New Delhi on 28 May 2014

Following the victory of the BJP in the 2014 general elections, he was sworn in as the Minister for Urban Development and Parliamentary Affairs on 26 May 2014.

Naidu is also involved with the Swarna Bharat Trust, a social service organisation founded by him in Nellore. The trust runs a school for poor, orphaned and special-needs children and imparts self-employment training programsme, especially for women and youth.

He was nominated by the BJP on 29 May 2016 for the Rajya Sabha from Rajasthan and was elected.

== Vice President of India (2017–2022) ==
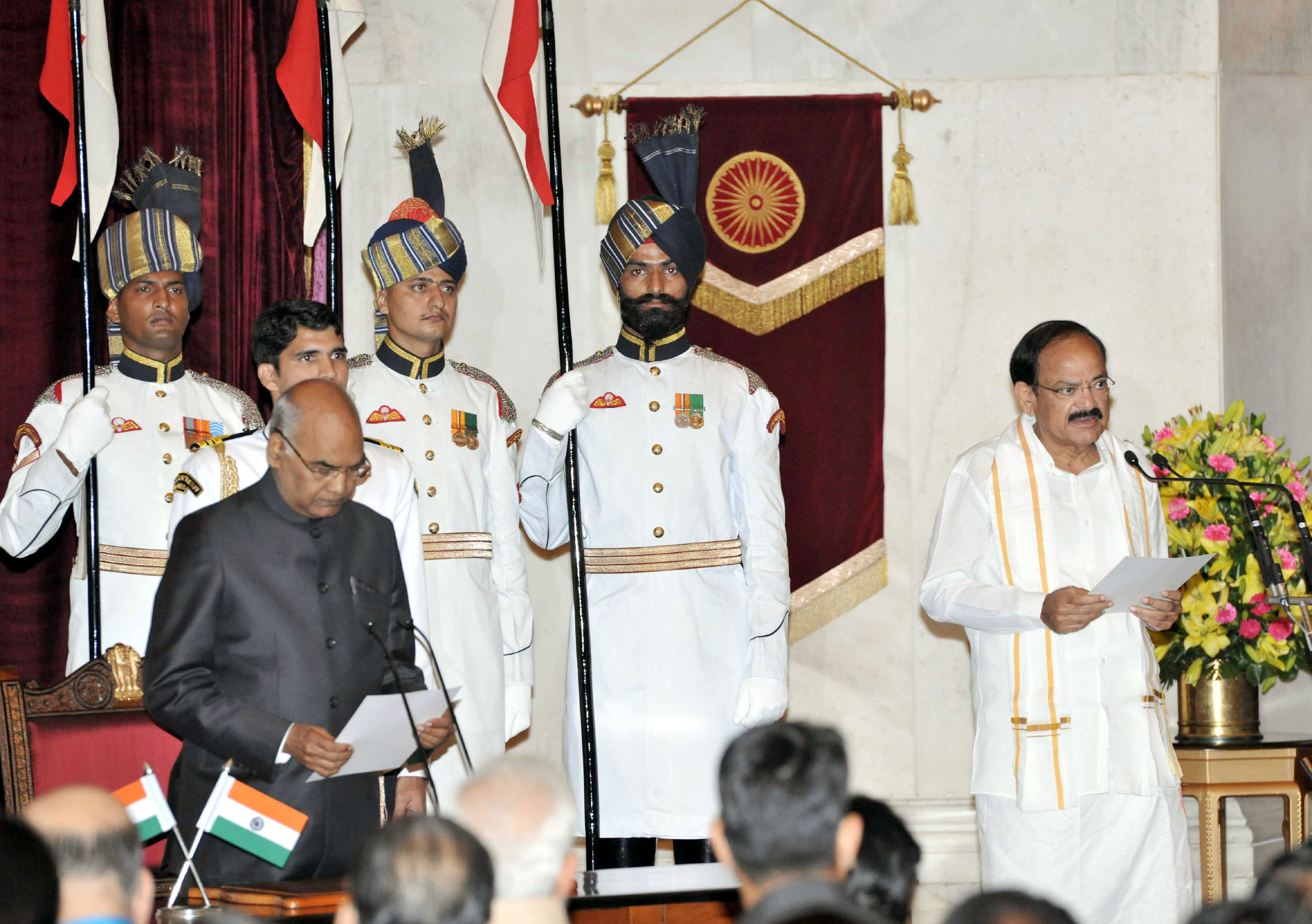
Swearing of Vice President-elect Venkaiah Naidu at Rashtrapati Bhavan Durbar Hall, 11 August 2017

=== Vice Presidential election ===
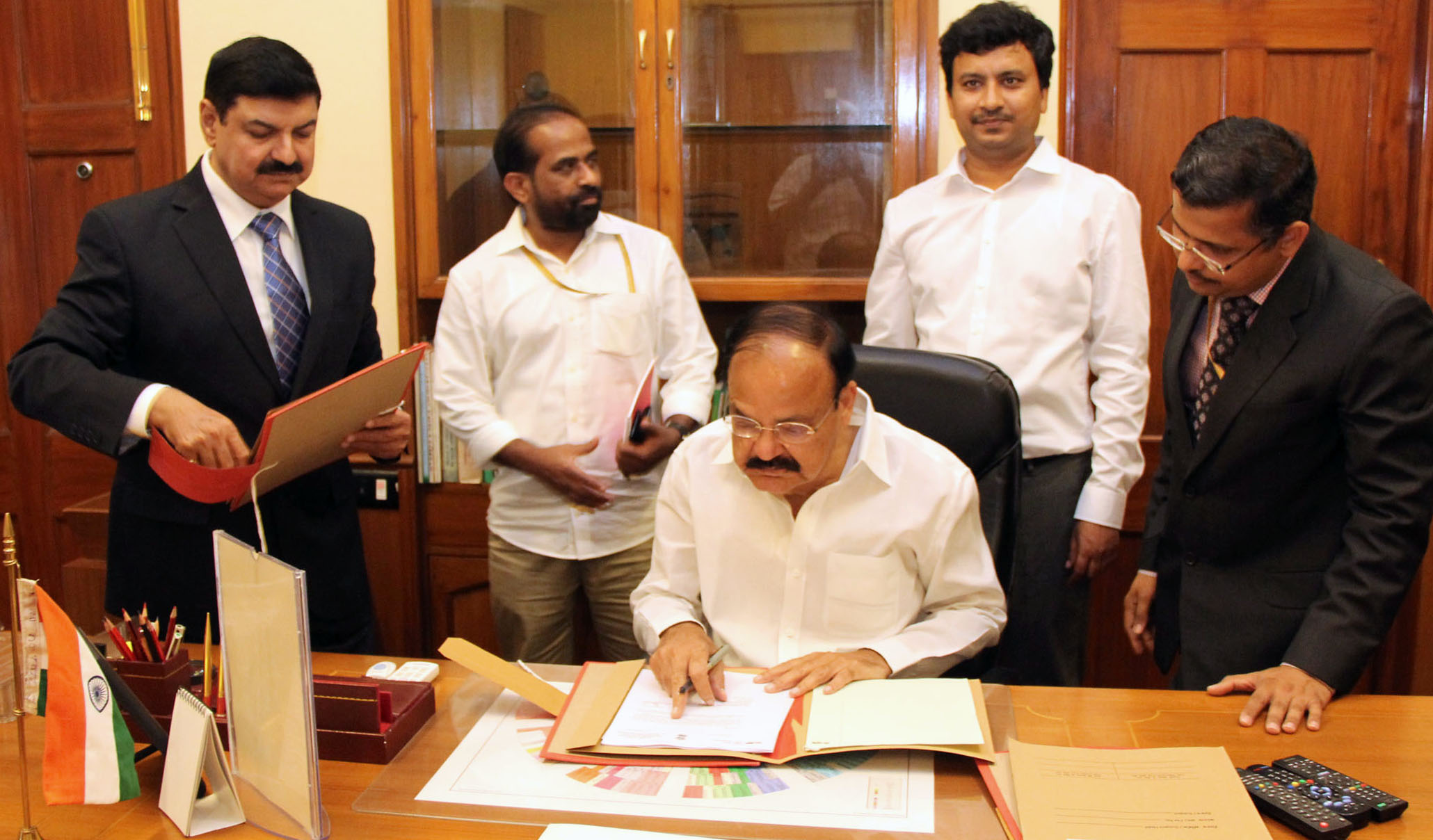
The Vice President, Shri M. Venkaiah Naidu assuming office at the Vice President Secretariat, in New Delhi on 11 August 2017

On 5 July 2016, he concurrently served as Minister of Information and Broadcasting. A year later, he resigned from both offices to contest the 2017 vice presidential election. He won the election to become India's 13th Vice President. He obtained 516 votes against UPA candidate Gopalkrishna Gandhi, who received 244 votes. As his tenure ended, Naidu decided to move back to Hyderabad with his family and declared that he will resume his career in the service of the nation. He was succeeded by Jagdeep Dhankhar on 11 August 2022.

== Personal life ==
Naidu married Usha on 14 April 1972, with whom he has a son and a daughter. Usha served as the 13th Second lady of India.

== Positions held ==
- 1973–74: President, Students' Union, Andhra University
- 1974: Convener, Lok Nayak Jai Prakash Narayan Yuvajana Chatra Sangharsha Samithi, Andhra Pradesh
- 1977–80: President, Youth Wings of Janata Party, Andhra Pradesh
- 1978–85: Member, Legislative Assembly, Andhra Pradesh (2 terms)
- 1980–85: Leader, B.J.P Legislative Party in Andhra Pradesh
- 1985–88: General Secretary, Andhra Pradesh State BJP
- 1988–93: President, Andhra Pradesh State BJP
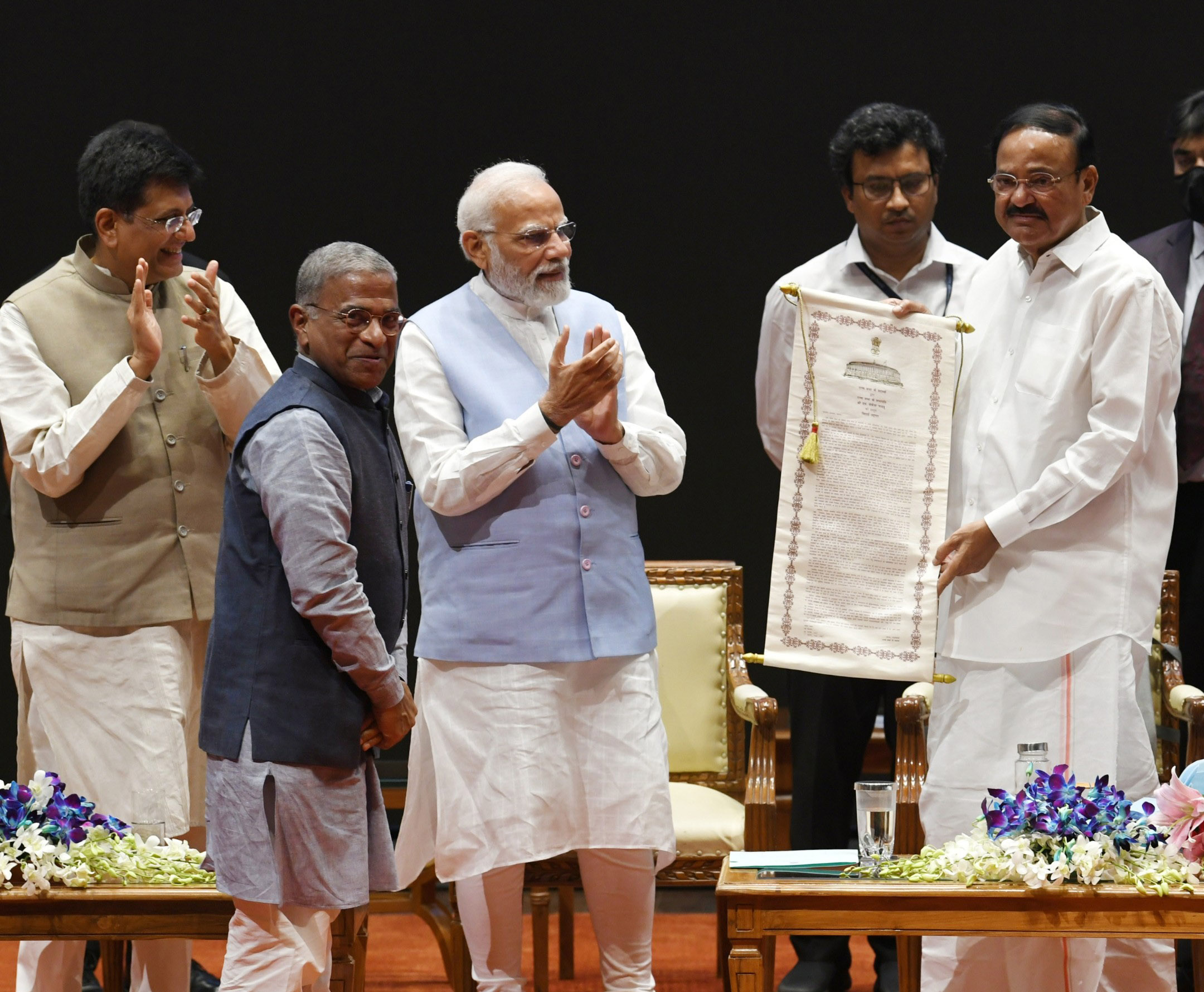
- Naidu at his farewell ceremony as vice president at New Delhi in August 2022 with Prime Minister Narendra Modi and other politicians.
  1993 – September 2000: National General Secretary, Bharatiya Janata Party
- Secretary, BJP Parliamentary Board
- Secretary, BJP Central Election Committee
- Spokesperson of the BJP
- Since 1998: Member, Rajya Sabha from Karnataka (3 terms)
- 30 September 2000 – 1 July 2002: Minister of Rural Development
- 1 July 2002 – 5 October 2004: National President, Bharatiya Janata Party
- April 2005 - 10 August 2017: National Vice-president, Bharatiya Janata Party.
- 2014–2017: Minister of Urban Development, Housing and Urban Poverty Alleviation and Parliamentary Affairs
- 2016–2017: Minister of Information and Broadcasting
- 2017–2022: Vice President of India

== Electoral history ==
=== Rajya Sabha ===
Position	Party	Constituency	From	To	Tenure
Member of Parliament, Rajya Sabha (1st Term)	BJP	Karnataka	3 April 1998	2 April 2004	5 years, 365 days
Member of Parliament, Rajya Sabha (2nd Term)	BJP	Karnataka	1 July 2004	30 June 2010	5 years, 364 days
Member of Parliament, Rajya Sabha (3rd Term)	BJP	Karnataka	1 July 2010	23 June 2016	5 years, 358 days
Member of Parliament, Rajya Sabha (4th Term)	BJP	Rajasthan	5 July 2016	10 August 2017	1 year, 36 days

== Awards and honours ==
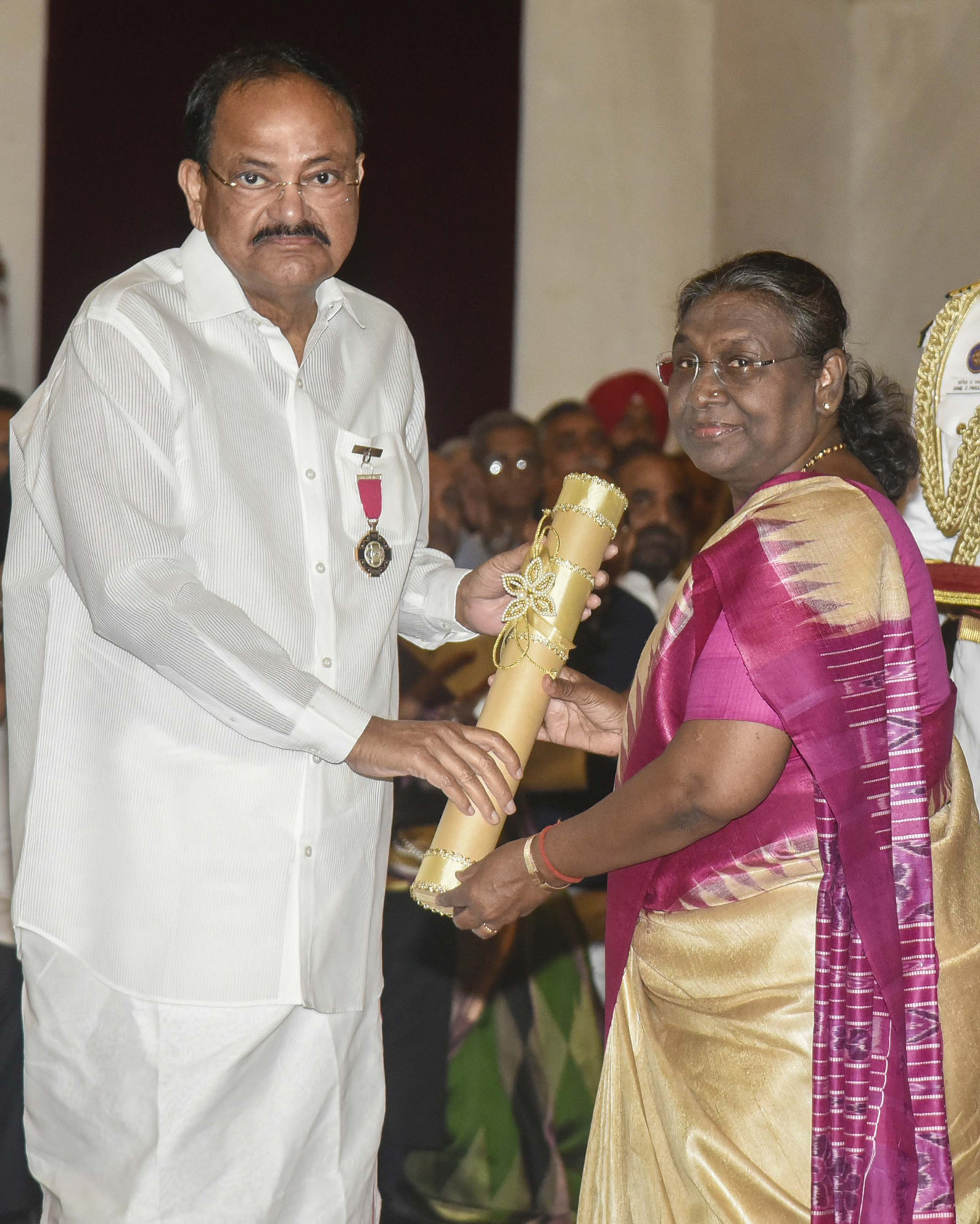
Naidu being felicitated with Padma Vibhushan by President Murmu

=== National honours ===
- India:
  - Padma Vibhushan (2024)

=== Foreign honours ===
- Comoros:
  - Order of the Green Crescent of the Comoros, Commander (3 August 2019)

=== Honorary degrees ===
- University for Peace
  - Doctor of Philosophy (D.Phil.) (8 March 2019)

Andhra Pradesh Legislative Assembly
Preceded by Ponneboyina Chenchuramaiah	Member of the Legislative Assembly for Udayagiri; 1978–1985	Succeeded by Mekapati Rajamohan Reddy
Rajya Sabha
Preceded by H. D. Deve Gowda	Member of Parliament for Karnataka; 1998–2016	Succeeded by Nirmala Sitharaman
Preceded by Anand Sharma	Member of Parliament for Rajasthan; 2016–2017	Succeeded by Alphons Kannanthanam
Political offices
Preceded by Sunder Lal Patwa	Minister of Rural Development; 2000–2002	Vacant Title next held by Kashiram Rana
Preceded by Kamal Nath	Minister of Parliamentary Affairs; 2014–2016	Succeeded by Ananth Kumar
Preceded by Kamal Nath	Minister of Urban Development; 2014–2017	Succeeded by Narendra Singh Tomar
Preceded by Girija Vyas	Minister of Housing and Urban Poverty Alleviation; 2014–2017	Succeeded by Narendra Singh Tomar
Preceded by Arun Jaitley	Minister of Information and Broadcasting; 2016–2017	Succeeded by Smriti Irani
Preceded by Mohammad Hamid Ansari	Vice President of India; 2017–2022	Succeeded by Jagdeep Dhankhar
Party political offices
Preceded by Jana Krishnamurthi	President of the Bharatiya Janata Party; 2002–2004	Succeeded by L. K. Advani
Preceded by Jaswant Singh	National Democratic Alliance nominee for Vice President of India; 2017	Succeeded by Jagdeep Dhankhar
