= The Architect of the New BJP =

2022 non-fiction book by Ajay Singh

The Architect of New BJP
- Author: Ajay Singh
- Original title: How Narendra Modi Transformed the Party
- Language: English
- Subject: Politics of India, Bhartiya Janta Party, Narendra Modi
- Genre: Non-fiction, Political Science
- Publisher: Penguin Ebury Press
- Publication date: 11 July 2022
- Media type: Print (Hardcover), E-book
- Pages: 288
- ISBN: 978-0670096961

The Architect of the New BJP: How Narendra Modi Transformed The Party is a 2022 political non-fiction book written by Indian journalist and author Ajay Singh. Published by Penguin Ebury Press, the book outlines the structural, organizational, and tactical transformation of the Bhartiya Janta Party (BJP) under the leadership of Narendra Modi. The book features a foreword written by political scientist Walter K. Andersen.

== Background and methodology ==
The book was researched over a five-year period beginning in 2017. The author Ajay Singh, conducted interviews with approximately 100 party workers, political observers, and leaders who operated alongside Narendra Modi during his formative years in the Rashtriya Swayamsevak Sangh and the BJP. To contextualize the party's organizational roots, Singh also examined historical records, foundational texts of the RSS, and literature from the 1950s and 1960s.

Ajay Singh, who at the time of publication was serving as press secretary to the president of India, wrote the book as a study of the BJP's growth from its early decades onwards. The hand cover edition runs to 288 pages (ISBN 978-0-670-09696-1). Media reports in July 2022 described it as a book about how Modi's organisational skills contributed to his political rise,

The book was formally launched on 29 august 2022 at that SAMVET Auditorium of the Indira Gandhi National Centre for the Arts in New Delhi

== Synopsis ==
The book analyses how the BJP expanded from its traditional strongholds into a pan India political force, securing parliamentary majorities in the 2014 and 2019 general elections. Rather than treating this growth as organic, Singh attributes this transformation to deliberate internal planning and specific organizational methodologies implemented by Modi.

According to the publishers' descriptions, the book looks at the party's past. Including the ideas of its founders, and also considers were the party may go next, It highlights less-publicised aspects of Modi's work. such as his use of traditional methods of party building. Key focus areas of the book include:

- Organizational building: Documenting Modi's transition from an RSS "pracharak" (full time worker) to a key organizational strategist for the BJP in Gujarat and nationally.
- The Notablisation strategy: Detailing the deliberate induction and recruitment of influential regional notables outside the traditional Sangh Parivar cadre to broaden the party's electoral appeal. The book notes historical internal resistance to this strategy from veteran conservative leaders like Kushabhau Thakre.
- Tactical management: Highlighting lesser known logistical experiments, such as the management of the 1986 Ahmedabad Jagannath Yatra, cadre training programs in Madhya Pradesh, and the early adoption of communication technologies over conventional press conferences.
- Continuation of lineage: Arguing that the contemporary "New BJP" represents an evolution of the organizational models laid down by party veterans Sunder Singh Bhandari, Kushabhau Thakre, and L.K.Advani, rather than a complete departure from the past.

== Reception ==
The book received coverage in major Indian news publications. Writing for "The Hindu", environmental historian and political analyst Mahesh Rangarajan noted that the book offered a veteran reporter's perspective on Modi's strategy and acumen.

A review in "The New Indian Express" described the work as a detailed dissection of the "Modi operandi," highlighting its focus on his organizational capabilities and the party's expansion into Eastern, Northeastern and Southern India.
