= Jana Krishnamurthi =

Indian political leader (1928–2007)

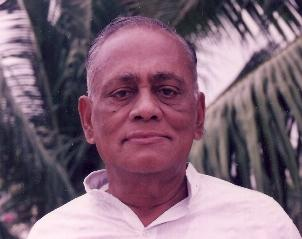

6th National President of the Bharatiya Janata Party
- In office 2001–2002
- Preceded by: Bangaru Laxman
- Succeeded by: Venkaiah Naidu

Personal details
- Born: 24 May 1928 Madurai, Madras Presidency, British Raj
- Died: 25 September 2007 (aged 79) Chennai, Tamil Nadu, India
- Spouse: Bhagyalakshmi
- Occupation: Lawyer, politician

K. Jana Krishnamurthi (24 May 1928 – 25 September 2007) was an Indian political leader who rose to be the President of the Bharatiya Janata Party (BJP) in 2001. A former Union Law Minister and a member of the Parliament of India, Krishnamurthi was the second person from Tamil Nadu to head a national party in India after Kamaraj.

== Early life ==
Krishnamurthi was born during the late British Raj in May 1926 in the town of Madurai in Tamil Nadu. An alumnus of the Chennai Law College, he gave up his successful law practice in Madurai in 1965. He was persuaded by M. S. Golwalkar, the then chief of the RSS, to enter politics.

== Political career ==
An active member of the Rashtriya Swayamsevak Sangh (RSS) from 1940, Krishnamurthi took over as the General Secretary of the Bharatiya Jana Sangh (BJS) in Tamil Nadu at the instance of Atal Bihari Vajpayee. He played an active part in building an equity for the relatively unknown BJS in South India.

In 1974, when Katchatheevu was ceded by India to Sri Lanka, he became the first Tamil leader to challenge it legally. On a request from Atal Behari Vajpayee, he filed a petition in the Madras High Court challenging the secession of Katchatheevu.

In 1975 when emergency was declared, he was the secretary of the resistance movement in Tamil Nadu. In 1977 when BJS merged with the Janata Party, he became the General Secretary of that party's Tamil Nadu unit. In 1980, he helped found the Bharatiya Janata Party (BJP) along with Atal Bihari Vajpayee, Lal Krishna Advani, SS Bhandari, Kushabhau Thakre and Jaganatha Rao Joshi. He was the founder National Secretary. In 1983 became one of the General Secretaries and from 1985 he was the Vice-President of the Party.

From 1980 to 1990, he helped the BJP expand in the four Southern states of Kerala, Tamil Nadu, Karnataka and Andhra Pradesh.

In 1993 he moved to Delhi at the request of L. K. Advani and set up the Intellectual Cells of the BJP on Economic, Defence and Foreign Affairs. From 1995 onwards he was in charge of the BJP Headquarters. He also served as the Spokesperson of the Party. In 1998, Krishnamurthi contested the Lok Sabha election from South Chennai and lost by a very small margin. On 14 March 2001 he took over as the President of the BJP from Bangaru Laxman. He held office until June 2002.

Krishnamurthi then became the Union Law Minister in the cabinet of Atal Bihari Vajpayee. He stepped down in a year, due to ill health. He was a Rajya Sabha Member of Parliament from the State of Gujarat and an active member of the Parliament Standing Committees on External Affairs and Defence. He was also the Chairman of the Petitions Committee. His tenure will be remembered for his frank and forthright report on Petrol Adulteration.

== Death ==
Krishnamurthi died on 25 September 2007. He succumbed to a cardio-respiratory arrest at a private hospital in Chennai. His wife, Bhagyalakshmi died on 14 May 2021. He is survived by two sons (Krishnaswamy and Anantha Narayan) and three daughters (Radhika, Bharathi, and Shanthi).
