= Bollineni Venkata Ramarao =

Inidian politician

Bollineni Venkata Ramarao (born 1963) is an Indian politician from Andhra Pradesh. He was a former member of the Andhra Pradesh Legislative Assembly from Udayagiri Assembly constituency in Nellore district representing the Telugu Desam Party.

== Early life ==
Ramarao is from Udayagiri, Nellore district, Andhra Pradesh. He is the son of Kondaiah Naidu. He completed Class 10 in 1979 and intermediate in 1981 at A.B.M. High School and Junior College respectively, inKavali. He is a contractor and businessman. He declared assets worth Rs.82 crore in 2014 and Rs.131 crore in 2019, in his affidavits to the Election Commission of India.

== Career ==
Ramarao won the Udayagiri Assembly constituency in the 2014 Andhra Pradesh Legislative Assembly election representing the Telugu Desam Party. He polled 85,873 votes and defeated his nearest rival, M. Chandra Sekhar Reddy of the YSR Congress Party, by a margin of 3,622 votes. He lost the 2019 Andhra Pradesh Legislative Assembly election to Mekapati Chandra Sekhar Reddy of the YSR Congress Party.
