= Kakarla Suresh =

Indian politician

Member of the Andhra Pradesh Legislative Assembly
- Incumbent
- Assumed office 2024
- Preceded by: Mekapati Chandrashekhar Reddy
- Constituency: Udayagiri

Personal details
- Party: Telugu Desam Party

Kakarla Suresh (born 1971) is an Indian politician from Andhra Pradesh. While his wife and children are citizens of the USA, he is a Permanent Resident of the USA. He is an MLA from Udayagiri Assembly constituency in Nellore district. He represents Telugu Desam Party. He won the 2024 Andhra Pradesh Legislative Assembly election where TDP had an alliance with BJP and JSP.

== Early life and education ==
Suresh is from Udayagiri. His father's name is Kakarla Venkata Subbaiah Naidu. Both Suresh and his wife are employed in software companies. He completed his Bachelor of Technology from Acharya Nagarjuna University, Guntur in 1993.

== Political career ==
Suresh won the 2024 Andhra Pradesh Legislative Assembly election from Udayagiri Assembly constituency representing Telugu Desam Party. He polled 101,537 votes and defeated Mekapati Rajagopal Reddy of YSR Congress Party by a margin of 9,621 votes.
