= Leader of the Bharatiya Janata Party in the Parliament of India =

Parliamentary position of the Parliament of India

- भारतीय जनता पार्टी के सदन में नेता
- Emblem of India

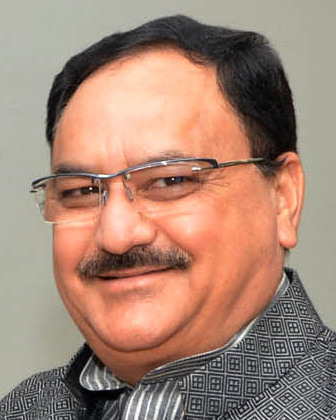
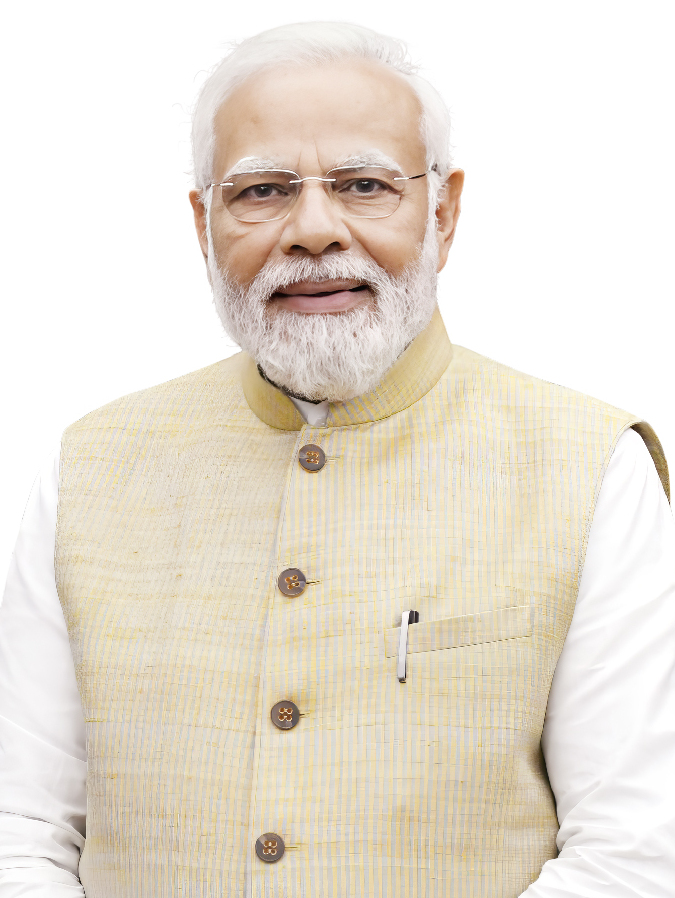
- Jagat Prakash Nadda (Rajya Sabha) Narendra Modi (Lok Sabha)
- Residence: New Delhi
- Appointer: Parliamentary Board of the Bharatiya Janata Party
- Term length: 6 years (Rajya Sabha); 5 years (Lok Sabha)
- Formation: 1989
- First holder: Jaswant Singh (Rajya Sabha); Chandupatla Janga Reddy (Lok Sabha)
- Website: Parliamentary website

The Leader of the Bharatiya Janata Party in Parliament is the parliamentary chairperson and representative of the National Executive of the Bharatiya Janata in the Parliament of India.

== Rajya Sabha Leader ==
#	Portrait	Name	Constituency	Term (in years and days)		
1		Jaswant Singh	Rajasthan	13 October 1980	27 November 1989	9 years, 45 days
2		Sushma Swaraj	Haryana	13 October 1990	6 July 1992	1 year, 267 days
3		Sikander Bakht	Madhya Pradesh	7 July 1992	13 October 1999	7 years, 98 days
(1)		Jaswant Singh	Rajasthan	13 October 1999	16 May 2009	9 years, 215 days
4		Arun Jaitley	Gujarat	3 June 2009	11 June 2019	10 years, 8 days
5		Thawar Chand Gehlot	Madhya Pradesh	11 June 2019	6 July 2021	2 years, 25 days
6		Piyush Goyal	Maharashtra	14 July 2021	24 June 2024	2 years, 346 days
7		Jagat Prakash Nadda	Gujarat	24 June 2024	Incumbent	2 years, 75 days

== Lok Sabha Leader ==
The Leader of the Bharatiya Janata Party in the Lok Sabha is the chief spokesperson and parliamentary head of the Bharatiya Janata Party (Note: Except 2004, Advani was leader of lok sabha, but vajpayee was the parliamentary party leader.) in the House. If the BJP forms the majority, the leader is usually elected as prime minister and leader of the House.

#	Portrait	Name	Constituency	Term (in years and days)			Lok Sabha
1		Chandupatla Janga Reddy	Hanamkonda	31 December 1984	27 November 1989	4 years, 331 days	8th
2		L. K. Advani	New Delhi	24 December 1990	25 July 1993	2 years, 213 days	9th
2		L. K. Advani	New Delhi	24 December 1990	25 July 1993	2 years, 213 days	10th
2		L. K. Advani	Gandhinagar	24 December 1990	25 July 1993	2 years, 213 days	10th
2		L. K. Advani	Advani also served as the Leader of the Opposition in Lok Sabha from 1990 to 1993.				10th
3		Atal Bihari Vajpayee	Lucknow	26 July 1993	22 May 2004	10 years, 301 days	10th
3		Atal Bihari Vajpayee	Lucknow	26 July 1993	22 May 2004	10 years, 301 days	11th
3		Atal Bihari Vajpayee	Lucknow	26 July 1993	22 May 2004	10 years, 301 days	12th
3		Atal Bihari Vajpayee	Lucknow	26 July 1993	22 May 2004	10 years, 301 days	13th
3		Atal Bihari Vajpayee	Became Leader of the Opposition in Lok Sabha in 1993 succeeding Advani and served in this position till 1996 when he became the Prime Minister of India.				13th
(2)		L. K. Advani	Gandhinagar	22 May 2004	21 December 2009	5 years, 213 days	14th
4		Sushma Swaraj	Vidisha	21 December 2009	26 May 2014	4 years, 156 days	15th
5		Narendra Modi	Varanasi	26 May 2014	Incumbent	12 years, 104 days	16th
5		Narendra Modi	Varanasi	26 May 2014	Incumbent	12 years, 104 days	17th
5		Narendra Modi	Varanasi	26 May 2014	Incumbent	12 years, 104 days	18th

== Parliamentary Party leader ==
- Atal Bihari Vajpayee; 1980–1986, 1993–1996, 1998–2009
- L. K. Advani; 1986–1993, 1996–1998, 2009–2014
- Narendra Modi; 2014–present

== See also ==
- List of national presidents of the Bharatiya Janata Party
- Leader of the House in Lok Sabha
- Leader of the House in Rajya Sabha
- Leader of the Opposition (India)
