= List of presidents of the Bharatiya Janata Party =

National Presidents of BJP

National President of the Bharatiya Janata Party
- Incumbent; Nitin Nabin since 20 January 2026
- Type: Political Party Head
- Reports to: National Council of Bharatiya Janata Party
- Residence: New Delhi
- Seat: 6-A, Deen Dayal Upadhyaya Marg, New Delhi
- Appointer: Committee consisting of party members from the National and State Executives
- Term length: Three years; (No more than two consecutive terms)
- Constituting instrument: Constitution of the Bharatiya Janata Party
- Formation: 6 April 1980
- First holder: Atal Bihari Vajpayee
- Website: www.bjp.org

The National President of the Bharatiya Janata Party is the chief executive authority of the BJP, and fills a number of roles, including chairing meetings of the National Executive of the party and appointing the presidents of party subsidiaries, such its youth wing and farmer's wing. Any candidate for the presidency needs to have been a member of the party for at least 15 years. The president is nominally elected by an electoral college composed of members drawn from the party's National and State councils, but in practice is a consensus choice of senior members of the party. The term of the president is three years long, and individuals may not serve more than two consecutive terms. The president usually does not also hold a post within a government, and party chiefs have resigned the position to assume posts in Cabinet.

After the party's foundation in 1980, Atal Bihari Vajpayee became its first president. He later became the prime minister of India, the only BJP president to serve in that position to date. In 1986, Lal Krishna Advani was sworn in as the party president and has been the longest serving president over three different periods. As of 2025, 12 people have served as the president of the BJP, including Rajnath Singh and Amit Shah who have also served two terms. Nitin Nabin is the incumbent president, having been appointed on 20 January 2026.

== List of National Presidents of Bharatiya Janata Party ==
| S. No. | Portrait | Name | Home State | Term | Ref |
|---|---|---|---|---|---|
| 1 | | Atal Bihari Vajpayee | Madhya Pradesh | 1980–1986 | |
| 1 | Vajpayee became the first president of the BJP upon its formation in 1980. Under him the BJP projected itself as a centrist party that had moved away from the strident politics of the BJS. Vajpayee, often seen as the moderate face of the BJP, later became the first Prime Minister of India not from the Indian National Congress to serve a full term. | | | | |
| 2 | An image of L. K. Advani. | L. K. Advani | Gujarat | 1986–1991 | |
| 2 | Advani succeeded Atal Bihari Vajpayee as president in 1986, an event usually associated with a shift in the BJP's ideology towards hardline Hindutva, exemplified by the Ram Rath Yatra led by Advani in 1990 as part of an effort to generate electoral support by appealing to Hindu nationalism. He had served as the president of the Bharatiya Jana Sangh in 1973. | | | | |
| 3 | | Murli Manohar Joshi | Uttarakhand | 1991–1993 | |
| 3 | BJP ideologue Joshi had been affiliated with the RSS nearly fifty years before he became BJP president in 1991. As with his predecessor L. K. Advani, he played a large role in the Ram Janmabhoomi agitation. He later served as a cabinet minister in the governments headed by Atal Bihari Vajpayee. During his presidency, the BJP became the principal opposition party for the first time. | | | | |
| (2) | An image of L. K. Advani. | L. K. Advani | Gujarat | 1993–1998 | |
| (2) | Advani had been a member of the RSS for fifty years when he took office for the second time. His aggressive campaigning helped the BJP became the largest party in the lower house of the Indian Parliament after elections in 1996. Though Atal Bihari Vajpayee became Prime Minister, Advani was seen as the power within the party, and later served as Deputy Prime Minister. | | | | |
| 4 | | Kushabhau Thakre | Madhya Pradesh | 1998–2000 | |
| 4 | Thakre had been associated with the RSS since 1942. He was not well known outside the BJP when he became the president in 1998, a few months after the BJP-led NDA government took office. During his tenure the BJP reduced its emphasis on Hindutva, such as its demand for abrogating Article 370 of the Indian constitution, to accommodate the views of a large coalition. | | | | |
| 5 | | Bangaru Laxman | Telangana | 2000–2001 | |
| 5 | Laxman, an RSS member of long standing, became the first Dalit president of the BJP in 2000. A year later a sting operation by Tehelka magazine showed him accepting a bribe, after which Laxman resigned immediately. He remained on the party's National Executive until 2012, when he was convicted for corruption and resigned. | | | | |
| 6 | | Jana Krishnamurthi (acting) | Tamil Nadu | 2001–2002 | |
| 6 | Krishnamurthi became acting president upon the resignation of Laxman, and was confirmed as president by the National Executive shortly afterwards. He resigned a year later when he became a minister in the central government under Atal Bihari Vajpayee as part of a cabinet reshuffle. | | | | |
| 7 | An image of Venkaiah Naidu. | Venkaiah Naidu | Andhra Pradesh | 2002–2004 | |
| 7 | Naidu was elected BJP president after Jana Krishnamurthi was drafted into the Cabinet. His election was seen by commentators as an example of L. K. Advani and the orthodox Hindu-nationalist wing of the party re-asserting control. Though elected to a full term, Naidu resigned after the NDA lost the 2004 Indian general election to the UPA led by the Indian National Congress. He later became the Vice President of India in 2017. | | | | |
| (2) | An image of L. K. Advani. | L. K. Advani | Gujarat | 2004–2005 | |
| (2) | Advani, then serving as the leader of the opposition in the Lok Sabha, became BJP president for the third time after Venkaiah Naidu resigned after the 2004 Indian general election. Advani continued to hold his position as leader of the opposition. Advani resigned as president in 2005, after his description of Muhammad Ali Jinnah as a secular leader caused controversy. | | | | |
| 8 | An image of Rajnath Singh. | Rajnath Singh | Uttar Pradesh | 2005–2009 | |
| 8 | Singh took office as BJP president in December 2005 for the remainder of Advani's term. He was reappointed for a full term in 2006. Singh had held many positions for the RSS and the BJP, including serving as the Chief Minister of Uttar Pradesh and the president of the BJP's youth wing. He advocated a return to a Hindutva platform. Singh resigned after the NDA lost the 2009 Indian general election | | | | |
| 9 | An image of Nitin Gadkari. | Nitin Gadkari | Maharashtra | 2009–2013 | |
| 9 | Gadkari became the youngest president of the BJP in 2009. A longtime RSS member, he had served as a minister in a coalition government in Maharashtra and as president of the BJP youth wing. He had strong support from the RSS leadership. Gadkari resigned in 2013 after a scandal related to his time as a minister and other allegations of financial impropriety. | | | | |
| (8) | An image of Rajnath Singh. | Rajnath Singh | Uttar Pradesh | 2013–2014 | |
| (8) | Singh was elected president for his second term after Gadkari stepped down in 2013. Singh played a large role in the BJP's campaign for the 2014 Indian general election, including declaring Narendra Modi the party's Prime Ministerial candidate despite opposition from within the BJP. After the party's landslide victory, Singh resigned the party presidency to assume the position of Home Minister. | | | | |
| 10 | An image of Amit Shah. | Amit Shah | Gujarat | 2014–2020 | |
| 10 | Shah, a close confidant of Indian Prime Minister Narendra Modi, became BJP president for the remainder of Rajnath Singh's term after the latter joined First Modi cabinet. Commentators described Shah's appointment as demonstrating Modi's control over the BJP. Shah was re-elected for a full three-year term in 2016. | | | | |
| 11 | | Jagat Prakash Nadda | Himachal Pradesh | 2020–2026 | |
| 11 | A long-time associate of the RSS, Nadda was involved with the ABVP in college, and rose through the ranks of the BJP youth wing. He was elected a member of the legislative assembly in Himachal Pradesh, and later held a ministership in the NDA-led Indian government from 1998 to 2003. He was elected "working president" of the BJP in 2019, and shared the responsibility of running the party with Amit Shah for a year before being elected president. | | | | |
| 12 | | Nitin Nabin | Bihar | 2026–present | |
| 12 | A long-time associate of the BJP, Nabin has held several organisational positions within the BJP. He has served as National General Secretary of the Bharatiya Janata Yuva Morcha (BJYM) and State President of BJYM Bihar. He was elected a member of the legislative assembly in Bihar from 2006, and later held a ministership in the NDA-led Bihar government from 2021. He was elected "working president" of the BJP in December 2025, and shared the responsibility of running the party with J. P. Nadda for a month before being elected president. | | | | |

== List of National Working Presidents of Bharatiya Janata Party ==
| S. No. | Portrait | Name | Term in office | | | Ref. |
|---|---|---|---|---|---|---|
| 1 | | Jagat Prakash Nadda | 17 June 2019 | 20 January 2020 | 217 days | |
| 2 | | Nitin Nabin | 14 December 2025 | 20 January 2026 | 36 days | |

== Interim/Acting Presidents ==
- Jana Krishnamurthi: 14 Mar 2001 – 24 Mar 2001 (Acting National President)

== See also ==
- List of state presidents of the Bharatiya Janata Party
- List of national presidents of the Indian National Congress
- List of leaders of the Rashtriya Swayamsevak Sangh
- Leader of the Bharatiya Janata Party in the Parliament of India
- List of general secretaries of the All India Anna Dravida Munnetra Kazhagam

== Bibliography ==
- Guha, Ramachandra (2007). India after Gandhi: the history of the world's largest democracy (1st ed.). Picador. ISBN 978-0-330-39610-3.
- Hansen, Thomas Blom (23 March 1999). The Saffron Wave: Democracy and Hindu Nationalism in Modern India. Princeton University Press. ISBN 978-1-4008-2305-5.
- Swain, Pratap Chandra (2001). Bharatiya Janata Party: Profile and Performance. APH Publishing. ISBN 978-81-7648-257-8.
