= Udayagiri Assembly constituency =

Constituency of the Andhra Pradesh Legislative Assembly, India

Coordinates: 14.8667°N 79.3167°E

Udayagiri
- Constituency No. 123 for the Andhra Pradesh Legislative Assembly
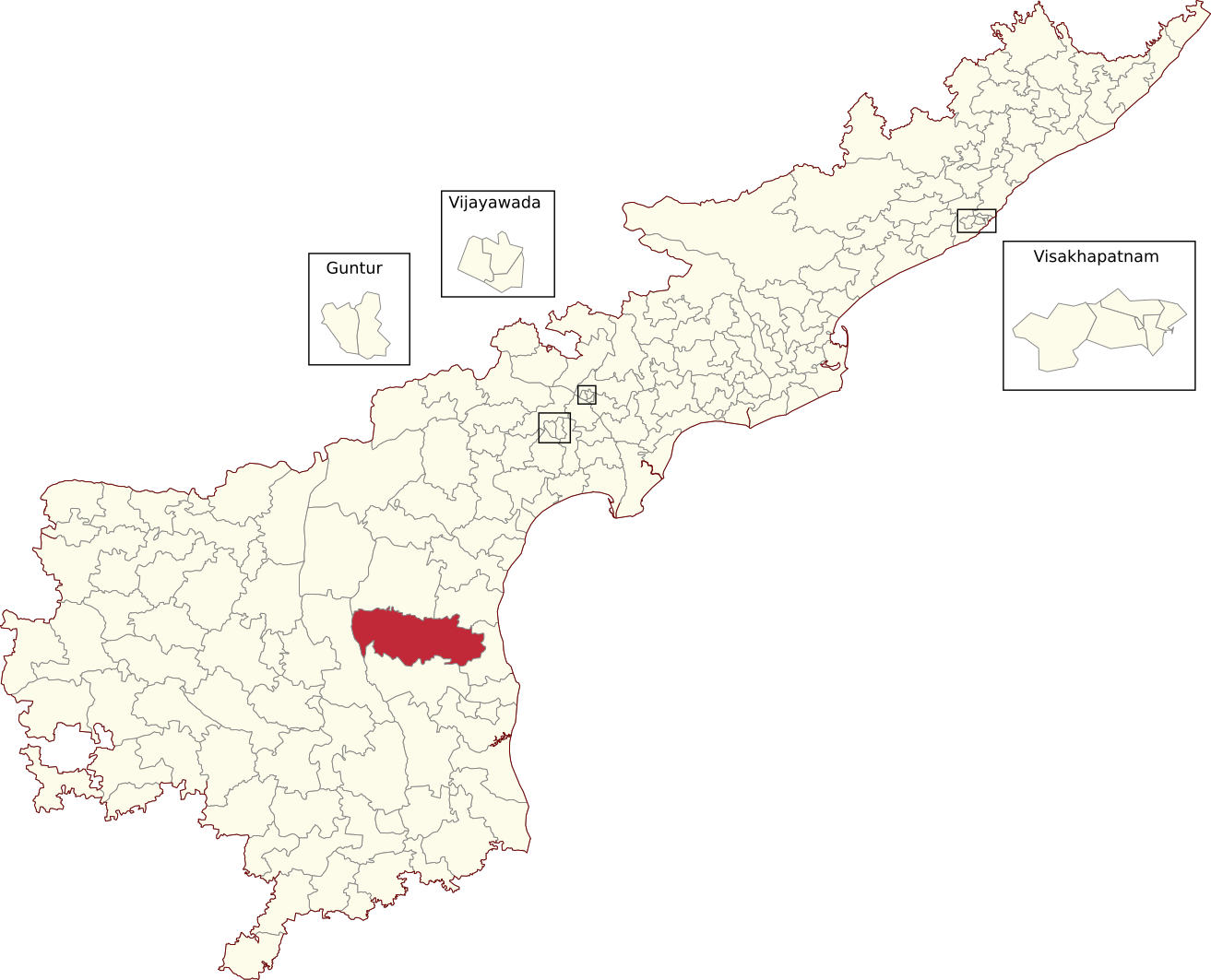
- Location of Udayagiri Assembly constituency within Andhra Pradesh

Constituency details
- Country: India
- Region: South India
- State: Andhra Pradesh
- District: Nellore
- Lok Sabha constituency: Nellore
- Established: 1951
- Total electors: 231,202
- Reservation: None

Member of Legislative Assembly
- 16th Andhra Pradesh Legislative Assembly
- Incumbent Kakarla Suresh
- Party: TDP
- Alliance: NDA
- Elected year: 2024

Udayagiri Assembly constituency is a constituency in Nellore district of Andhra Pradesh that elects representatives to the Andhra Pradesh Legislative Assembly in India. It is one of the seven assembly segments of Nellore Lok Sabha constituency.

Kakarla Suresh is the current MLA of the constituency, having won the 2024 Andhra Pradesh Legislative Assembly election from Telugu Desam Party. As of 2024, there are a total of 231,202 electors in the constituency. The constituency was established in 1951, as per the Delimitation Orders (1951).

== Mandal ==
There are Eight Mandals.

Mandals
Jaladanki
Seetharamapuram
Udayagiri
Varikuntapadu
Vinjamur
Duttalur
Kaligiri
Kondapuram

== Members of the Legislative Assembly ==
Year	Member	Political party
1952	Kovi Ramayya Chowdary	Kisan Mazdoor Praja Party
1955	Sheik Moula Saheb	Indian National Congress
1962	P. Venkat Reddy	Indian National Congress
1967	Narasimha Dhanenkula	Swatantra Party
1972	Ponneboyina Chenchuramaiah	Indian National Congress
1978	Muppavarapu Venkaiah Naidu	Janata Party
1983	Muppavarapu Venkaiah Naidu	Bharatiya Janata Party
1985	Mekapati Rajamohan Reddy	Indian National Congress
1989	Madala Janakiram	Indian National Congress
1994	Kambam Vijaya Rami Reddy	Telugu Desam Party
1999	Kambam Vijaya Rami Reddy	Telugu Desam Party
2004	Mekapati Chandrasekhar Reddy	Indian National Congress
2009	Mekapati Chandrasekhar Reddy	Indian National Congress
2012 by-election	Mekapati Chandrasekhar Reddy	YSR Congress Party
2014	Bollineni Venkata Ramarao	Telugu Desam Party
2019	Mekapati Chandrasekhar Reddy	YSR Congress Party
2024	Kakarla Suresh	Telugu Desam Party

== Election results ==
=== 1952 ===
1952 Madras Legislative Assembly election: Udayagiri
Party	Candidate	Votes	%	±%
KMPP	Kovi Ramayya Chowdary	18,022	49.77%	
INC	Bezawada Gopala Reddy	15,644	43.20%	43.20%
Socialist Party (India)	Maddur Chinna Reddi	2,544	7.03%	
Margin of victory		2,378	6.57%	
Turnout		36,210	58.03%	
Registered electors		62,398		
KMPP win (new seat)				

=== 1955 ===
1955 Andhra Pradesh Legislative Assembly election: Udayagiri
Party	Candidate	Votes	%	±%
INC	Shaik Moula Saheb	8,446	35.39%	
CPI	Kotapati Guruswami Reddy	7,868	32.97%	
Margin of victory		578	2.42%	
Turnout		23,865	45.79%	
Registered electors		51,003		
INC gain from KMPP		Swing		

=== 1962 ===
1962 Andhra Pradesh Legislative Assembly election: Udayagiri
Party	Candidate	Votes	%	±%
INC	P Venkata Reddy	17,128	50.58%	
CPI	S Papi Reddy	10,726	31.68%	
Margin of victory		6,402	18.91%	
Turnout		35,482	63.60%	
Registered electors		55,791		
INC hold		Swing		

=== 1967 ===
1967 Andhra Pradesh Legislative Assembly election: Udayagiri
Party	Candidate	Votes	%	±%
SWA	Narasimhulu Dhanekula	29,500	54.13%	
INC	Ramaiah Chowdary Kovi	19,826	36.38%	
Margin of victory		9,674	17.75%	
Turnout		56,667	66.42%	
Registered electors		85,316		
SWA gain from INC		Swing		

=== 1972 ===
1972 Andhra Pradesh Legislative Assembly election: Udayagiri
Party	Candidate	Votes	%	±%
INC	Ponneboyina Chenchu Ramaiah	30,082	55.23%	
SWA	Mada A Thimmaiah	15,868	29.13%	
Margin of victory		14,214	26.10%	
Turnout		55,529	58.47%	
Registered electors		94,973		
INC gain from SWA		Swing		

=== 1978 ===
1978 Andhra Pradesh Legislative Assembly election: Udayagiri
Party	Candidate	Votes	%	±%
JP	Muppavarapu Venkaiah Naidu	33,268	47.99%	
INC(I)	Janakiram Madala	23,608	34.05%	
INC	Ponneboyina Chenchu Ramaiah	7,390	10.66%	
Independent	Rajaram Reddy Ganapam	3,278	4.73%	
Margin of victory		9,660	13.93%	
Turnout		70,436	67.79%	
Registered electors		103,904		
JP gain from INC		Swing		

=== 1983 ===
1983 Andhra Pradesh Legislative Assembly election: Udayagiri
Party	Candidate	Votes	%	±%
BJP	Muppavarapu Venkaiah Naidu	42,694	59.53%	
INC	Mekapati Rajamohan Reddy	22,194	30.95%	
Margin of victory		20,500	28.59%	
Turnout		72,790	66.68%	
Registered electors		109,166		
BJP gain from JP		Swing		

=== 1985 ===
1985 Andhra Pradesh Legislative Assembly election: Udayagiri
Party	Candidate	Votes	%	±%
INC	Mekapati Rajamohan Reddy	34,464	49.25%	
Independent	Kambham Vijayarami Reddy	18,951	27.08%	
Margin of victory		15,513	22.17%	
Turnout		70,976	61.88%	
Registered electors		114,705		
INC gain from BJP		Swing		

=== 1989 ===
1989 Andhra Pradesh Legislative Assembly election: Udayagiri
Party	Candidate	Votes	%	±%
INC	Janakiram Madala	46,556	51.87%	
TDP	Kambham Vijayarami Reddy	42,794	47.68%	
Margin of victory		3762	4.19%	
Turnout		92,318	68.33%	
Registered electors		135,106		
INC hold		Swing		

=== 1994 ===
1994 Andhra Pradesh Legislative Assembly election: Udayagiri
Party	Candidate	Votes	%	±%
Independent	Kambham Vijayarami Reddy	51,712	61.58%	
INC	Janakiram Madala	26,793	31.91%	
Margin of victory		24,919	19.67%	
Turnout		85,601	69.04%	
Registered electors		123,990		
Independent gain from INC		Swing		

=== 1999 ===
1999 Andhra Pradesh Legislative Assembly election: Udayagiri
Party	Candidate	Votes	%	±%
TDP	Kambham Vijayarami Reddy	43,995	49.98	
INC	Mekapati Chandrasekhar Reddy	39,220	44.56	
Majority		4,775	5.42	
Turnout		90,201	66.37	
Registered electors		120,191		
TDP gain from Independent		Swing		

=== 2004 ===
2004 Andhra Pradesh Legislative Assembly election: Udayagiri
Party	Candidate	Votes	%	±%
INC	Mekapati Chandrasekhar Reddy	55,076	61.66	
TDP	Kambham Vijayarami Reddy	32,001	35.83	
Majority		23,075	25.83	
Turnout		89,319	74.31	+9.54
Registered electors		120,191		
INC gain from TDP		Swing		

=== 2009 ===
2009 Andhra Pradesh Legislative Assembly election: Udayagiri
Party	Candidate	Votes	%	±%
INC	Mekapati Chandrasekhar Reddy	69,352	46.92	−14.74
TDP	Kambham Vijayarami Reddy	55,870	37.80	+1.97
PRP	Sunkara Anjanadri	14,512	9.82	
Majority		13,482	9.12	
Turnout		147,807	72.53	−1.78
Registered electors		203,782		
INC hold		Swing		

=== 2012 ===
2012 Andhra Pradesh by-elections: Udayagiri
Party	Candidate	Votes	%	±%
YSRCP	Mekapati Chandrasekhar Reddy	75,103	46.82	
TDP	Bollineni Venkata Rama Rao	44,505	27.74	
INC	Kambham Vijayarami Reddy	34,489	21.50	
Majority		30,598	19.08	
Turnout		1,60,410	81.85	
Registered electors		1,95,963		
YSRCP gain from INC		Swing		

=== 2014 ===
2014 Andhra Pradesh Legislative Assembly election: Udayagiri
Party	Candidate	Votes	%	±%
TDP	Bollineni Venkata Ramarao	85,873	48.93	
YSRCP	Mekapati Chandrasekhar Reddy	82,251	46.87	
Majority		3,622	2.06	
Turnout		175,505	77.64	+5.11
Registered electors		226,246		
TDP gain from YSRCP		Swing		

=== 2019 ===
2019 Andhra Pradesh Legislative Assembly election: Udayagiri
Party	Candidate	Votes	%	±%
YSRCP	Mekapati Chandrasekhar Reddy	106,487	57.31	
TDP	Bollineni Venkata Ramarao	69,959	37.65	
BJP	Gundlapalli Bharat Kumar	3,102	1.67	
Majority		36,528	19.66	
Turnout		185933	80.42	
Registered electors		231,202		
YSRCP gain from TDP		Swing		

=== 2024 ===
2024 Andhra Pradesh Legislative Assembly election: Udayagiri
Party	Candidate	Votes	%	±%
TDP	Suresh Kakarla	101,537	50.54	
YSRCP	Mekapati Rajagopal Reddy	91,916	45.75	
INC	Somu Anil Kumar Reddy	2,512	1.25	
NOTA	None Of The Above	2,072	1.03	
Majority		9,621	4.79	
Turnout		2,00,892		
TDP gain from YSRCP		Swing		

== See also ==
- List of constituencies of Andhra Pradesh Vidhan Sabha
