= Mekapati Chandrasekhar Reddy =

Indian politician

Member of Legislative Assembly, Andhra Pradesh
- In office 2019–2024
- Preceded by: Bollineni Venkata Rama Rao
- Succeeded by: Kakarla Suresh
- Constituency: Udayagiri
- In office 2004–2014
- Preceded by: Kambam Vijaya Rami Reddy
- Succeeded by: Bollineni Venkata Rama Rao
- Constituency: Udayagiri

Personal details
- Party: Telugu Desam Party (since 2023)
- Other political affiliations: YSR Congress Party (until 2023); Indian National Congress

Mekapati Chandrasekhar Reddy (born 1954) is an Indian politician from Andhra Pradesh. He is a four-time MLA from Udayagiri Assembly Constituency in Nellore district. He won the 2019 Andhra Pradesh Legislative Assembly election representing YSR Congress Party but did not contest the 2024 Assembly election.

== Early life and education ==
Reddy was born in Brahmanapalli, Marripaadu, Nellore district. His father M. Venku Reddy was a farmer. He completed his intermediate, the pre university course, from Jawahar Bharathi in Kavali in 1968.

== Career ==
Reddy started his political career with Indian National Congress in 2004. He won the Udayagiri Assembly Constituency representing Congress Party in the 2004 Andhra Pradesh Legislative Assembly Election defeating Kambam Vijayarami Reddy of Telugu Desam Party by a margin of 23,075 votes. He was reelected from Udayagiri on Congress ticket in the 2009 Andhra Pradesh Legislative Assembly Election. Later, he joined YSR Congress Party and won the 2012 byelection but lost the 2014 Assembly Election. He regained the seat in the 2019 Andhra Pradesh Legislative Assembly Election beating Bollineni Venkata Ramarao of Telugu Desam Party by a margin of 36,528 votes. In March 2023, he was suspended by YSRCP for allegedly cross voting in the MLC elections. In December 2023, he joined TDP but did not contest the 2024 election.
