= Vallabhbhai Kathiria =

Indian politician

Dr. Vallabhbhai Kathiria
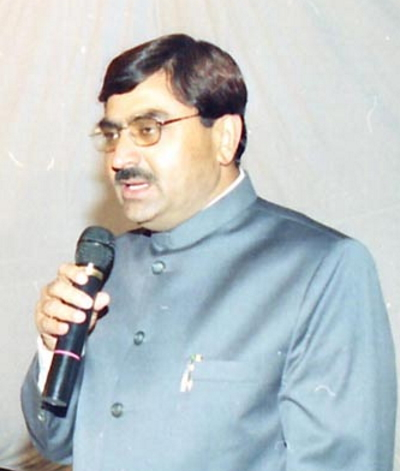

MP, LS
- In office 1996-2009
- Constituency: Rajkot

Personal details
- Born: 30 November 1954 (age 71) Rajkot, Saurashtra, India
- Party: Bharatiya Janata Party
- Spouse: Smt. Kantaben Kathiria
- Children: 1 son and Ghatana Kathiria daughter
- Website: www.drkathiria.org
- As of 25 February, 2006

Dr. Vallabhbhai Kathiria (born 30 November 1954) is an Indian politician and former Member of Parliament who served as Union Minister of State in various ministries under Prime Minister Atal Bihari Vajpayee's government.

== Political career ==
Kathiria represented Rajkot constituency in the Lok Sabha for four consecutive terms (1996–2009). He served as Union Minister of State handling portfolios in Heavy Industries, Human Resource Development, and Health and Family Welfare. He is a senior leader of the Bharatiya Janata Party in Gujarat and has served as Chairman of the Rashtriya Kamdhenu Aayog and Gujarat Gau Seva and Gauchar Vikas Board.

== Contributions ==
=== Water Conservation ===
Known as the "Check Dam Sansad," Kathiria initiated the construction of over 100,000 check dams and water harvesting structures in Saurashtra (state) region to address water scarcity.

=== Public health ===
As a cancer surgeon and politician, he has contributed to healthcare initiatives including organizing the Arogya Mela (2004). He holds the distinction of donating blood 133 times.

=== Organizational Leadership ===
Kathiria has organized several large-scale public events including:

Heavy Meets Small Industrial fair (1999) National Book Fair (Pustak Mela) (2002) Agro Vision (2002) Gau Tech (2023)

== Personal life ==
Kathiria is married to Smt. Kantaben Kathiria, who serves as Prant Sahyojak of Maila Samanvay and Prant Sampark Pramukh of Rashtra Sevika Samiti, Saurashtra Prant. He has two children: Dr. Atman Kathiria (M.D.- Radiology) and Dr. Nishtha (M.D.S.).
