= Ponneboyina Chenchuramaiah =

Indian politician

Ponneboyina Chenchuramaiah an Indian politician who is part of the Indian National Congress. He served as an MLA of the Andhra Pradesh Legislative Assembly, representing Udayagiri from 1972 to 1978.

== Career ==
Chenchuramaiah also served as Udayagiri Samithi President for two terms before being elected as MLA. During his period as MLA he fought with then Chief Minister of AP Jalagam Vengala Rao to grant a reservoir to Udayagiri to serve water to the farmers of the region. Rao has sanctioned the reservoir to Udayagiri as the Gandipalem reservoir. After his death, towards his service to Udayagiri then CM YS Rajasekhar Reddy renamed Gandipalem reservoir to Ponneboyina Chenchuramaiah reservoir. This reservoir is a minor irrigation project in Nellore district and is a major source for irrigation in Udayagiri. Chenchuramaiah is the first BC MLA to have irrigation project on his name in Andhra Pradesh. He is also first BC MLA from Nellore district. During his term as MLA he has done many developmental activities in Udayagiri and fought for the uplifting of the underprivileged.

His son Ponneboyina Chenchalababu Yadav served as Zilla Parishad chairman Nellore (Cabinet Rank). Currently he is an All India Congress committee member and also General Secretary of Andhra Pradesh Congress Committee.
