= Ashok Kumar Pradhan =

Indian politician

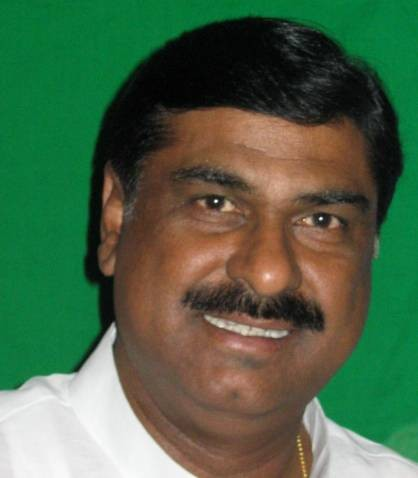
- Pradhan in 1996

Member of Parliament in Lok Sabha
- In office 16 May 1996 – 16 May 2009
- Preceded by: Roshan Lal
- Succeeded by: constituency abolished
- Constituency: Khurja

Personal details
- Born: 13 December 1953 (age 72) Ghondli, Delhi
- Party: Bharatiya Janata Party
- Spouse: Bimla Pradhan (m. 1983)
- Children: 3 (1 son & 2 daughters)
- Website: ashokpradhan.in
- As of 12 October 2022

Ashok Kumar Pradhan (born 13 December 1953) is an Indian industrialist and politician from Uttar Pradesh. He served as a Member of Parliament (MP) in Lok Sabha representing Khurja (Noida) from 1996 to 2009 as a Bharatiya Janata Party (BJP) candidate.

== Political career ==
In April 2014, Pradhan left BJP and joined the Samajwadi Party.
