= Kushabhau Thakre =

Indian politician (1922–2003)

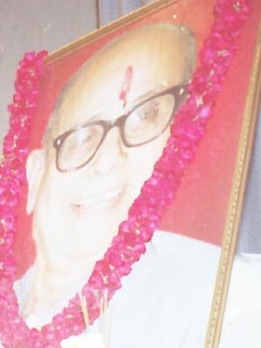

4th National President of the Bharatiya Janata Party
- In office 1998–2000
- Preceded by: Lal Krishna Advani
- Succeeded by: Bangaru Laxman

Personal details
- Born: 15 August 1922 Dhar, Central India Agency, British India
- Died: 28 December 2003 (aged 81) New Delhi, India
- Party: Bharatiya Janata Party
- Profession: Lawyer, politician

Kushabhau Thakre (15 August 1922 – 28 December 2003) was an Indian politician belonging to the Bharatiya Janata Party and a Member of Parliament.

== Early life ==
Kushabhau Thakre was born at Dhar, Madhya Pradesh in a Chandraseniya Kayastha Prabhu family to parents Dr. Sundarrao Shripatirao Thakre (father) and Smt. Shantabai Sundarrao Thakre (mother). He was educated at Dhar and Gwalior.

== Career in RSS ==
In 1942 he was inducted as a Pracharak by the Rashtriya Swayamsevak Sangh then moved to the Ratlam Division (Ratlam, Ujjain, Mandsaur, Jhabua, Chittaur, Kota, Bundi, Jhalawad, Banswada (Raj.), Dahod (Gujarat)). He moved up in the Jana Sangh, the political wing of the RSS at the time.

== Political career ==
=== Early politics (1956–1967) ===
In 1956 he became Secretary (Organisation) Madhya Pradesh of the Bharatiya Jana Sangh. He was appointed All India Secretary of Bharatiya Jana Sangh, Orissa and also additional in charge of Gujarat in 1967.

=== Initial politics (1970–1979) ===
In 1974 he was made All India Secretary (Organisation). During the 1975–1977 Emergency, he was jailed for 19 months alongside other opposition political leaders. He was elected to Lok Sabha in 1979 in a by-election from Khandwa, Madhya Pradesh. He lost General Election from Khandwa in 1980. But he mostly stayed away from electoral politics.

=== Established politician (1980–2000) ===
When the Bharatiya Janata Party was formed in 1980, he was appointed a Secretary and in charge of Gujarat, Odisha and Madhya Pradesh. He remained on this post until 1984. Throughout the years, he held offices as a national General Secretary, Vice-President or "in-charge" of a particular state.

==== Party president ====
On 14 April 1998 Thakre was elected as president of the Bharatiya Janata Party. In August 2000, he stepped down from this post.In his presidency during 1999 General Election of India for Parliament (Loksabha) Bhartiya Janta Party (BJP) became Single Largest Party and Atal Bihari Vajpayee became Prime Minister with the Support of other political parties called NDA. He was instrumental in selecting Narendra Modi as General Secretary (Organisation) of the Bharatiya Janata Party in 1998, from where he climbed the ladders upto being Prime Minister of India.

== Death ==
He died 28 December 2003 at the age of 81 at All India Institute of Medical Sciences, Delhi after prolonged illness as he was suffering from kidney cancer.

== Legacy ==
Some of the places named after him are Kushabhau Thakre University of Journalism and Mass Communication in Raipur, Kushabhau Thakre Nursing College, Kushabhau Thakre Inter State Bus Terminal in Bhopal, Kushabhau Thakre Community Hall in Ahmedabad, Kushabhau Thakre hall(Minto Hall, Bhopal) Kushabhau Thakre District hospital in Shahdol and Kushabhau Thakre Road in Indore.
