= Bangaru Laxman =

Indian politician (1939–2014)

5th National President of Bharatiya Janata Party
- In office 2000–2001
- Preceded by: Kushabhau Thakre
- Succeeded by: Jana Krishnamurthy

Personal details
- Born: 17 March 1939 Shamshabad, Hyderabad State, British India
- Died: 1 March 2014 (aged 74) Secunderabad, Telangana, India
- Party: Bharatiya Janata Party
- Spouse: Bangaru Sushila
- Children: Bangaru Shruthi; 2 daughters and a son
- Parent(s): Bangaru Narasimha; Bangaru Shivamma
- Education: BA & LLB
- Occupation: Politician

Bangaru Laxman (17 March 1939 – 1 March 2014) was an Indian politician. He was a member of the Bharatiya Janata Party (BJP) and the Rashtriya Swayamsevak Sangh (RSS). He was president of the party from 2000 to 2001 and served as Minister of Railways in the Indian government from 1999 to 2000. He was sentenced to four years in jail for the defence deal corruption case.

== Early life ==
Bangaru Laxman was born in Madiga caste (a Dalit community) in present-day Telangana. His father was B. Narasimha and mother was B. Shivamma. He did his BA and LLB in Hyderabad. His wife Susheela Laxman Bangaru was a member of 14th Lok Sabha. She was elected from Jalore constituency in Rajasthan as a candidate of Bharatiya Janata Party. He had a son and three daughters.

== Career ==
Laxman entered politics at a young age. He was jailed during emergency in 1975. He was elected to Rajya Sabha in 1996. He worked as AP (now Telangana state) state BJP President from 1986 to 1988. He has held many party positions including the party president during 2000–2001. He was the first Dalit president of BJP. He was member of AP (now Telangana) Legislative Council from 1980–85. He was member of Rajya Sabha representing Gujarat from 1996–2002. He served in the Council of Ministers as Minister of State for Planning, Statistics and Programme Implementation from October- November 1999 and Ministry of Railway from November 1999 to August 2000.

At the age of 12, in 1953, he joined the Rashtriya Swayamsevak Sangh and held several organisational responsibilities, and became active member of Jan Sangh Party in 1969. In the meanwhile he joined the government service in Electricity Department, in Government of AP (now Telangana) in 1958. He had his primary education in government high school in Nampally in Hyderabad and did BA from Osmania University. He also completed his LLB in evening college of Law, Osmania University in Hyderabad. He was actively associated with working class movement and headed trade union activities.

== Controversy ==
Laxman was involved in a major controversy when a private TV network Tehelka allegedly showed him taking bribes from Mathew Samuel on a hidden camera while he was the president of the BJP. He was convicted by a Special CBI Court on 27 April 2012 of taking bribe under Prevention of Corruption Act and was taken into custody.

Bangaru Laxman was convicted in defence deal Tehelka corruption case. Laxman was sentenced to 4-year rigorous imprisonment in prison for his crimes.

Laxman was sentenced to four years in jail on 28 April 2012. 72-year-old Bangaru, who was held guilty in the case, was produced from Tihar Jail before Special CBI Judge Kanwal Jeet Arora. Bangaru was convicted of taking bribe from fake arms dealer to recommend to the defence ministry to award them a contract to supply thermal binoculars to the Army. Soon after the judgment Bangaru Laxman resigned from the party's National Executive. He was granted bail under Justice A K Pathak with a bail bond of ₹ 50,000.

== Death ==
Bangaru Lakshman died on 1 March 2014 at Yashoda Hospital, Secunderabad in Hyderabad, from a prolonged illness and respiratory problems. He was out on bail due to health concerns.
